= Madonna videography =

Videos and media by American singer

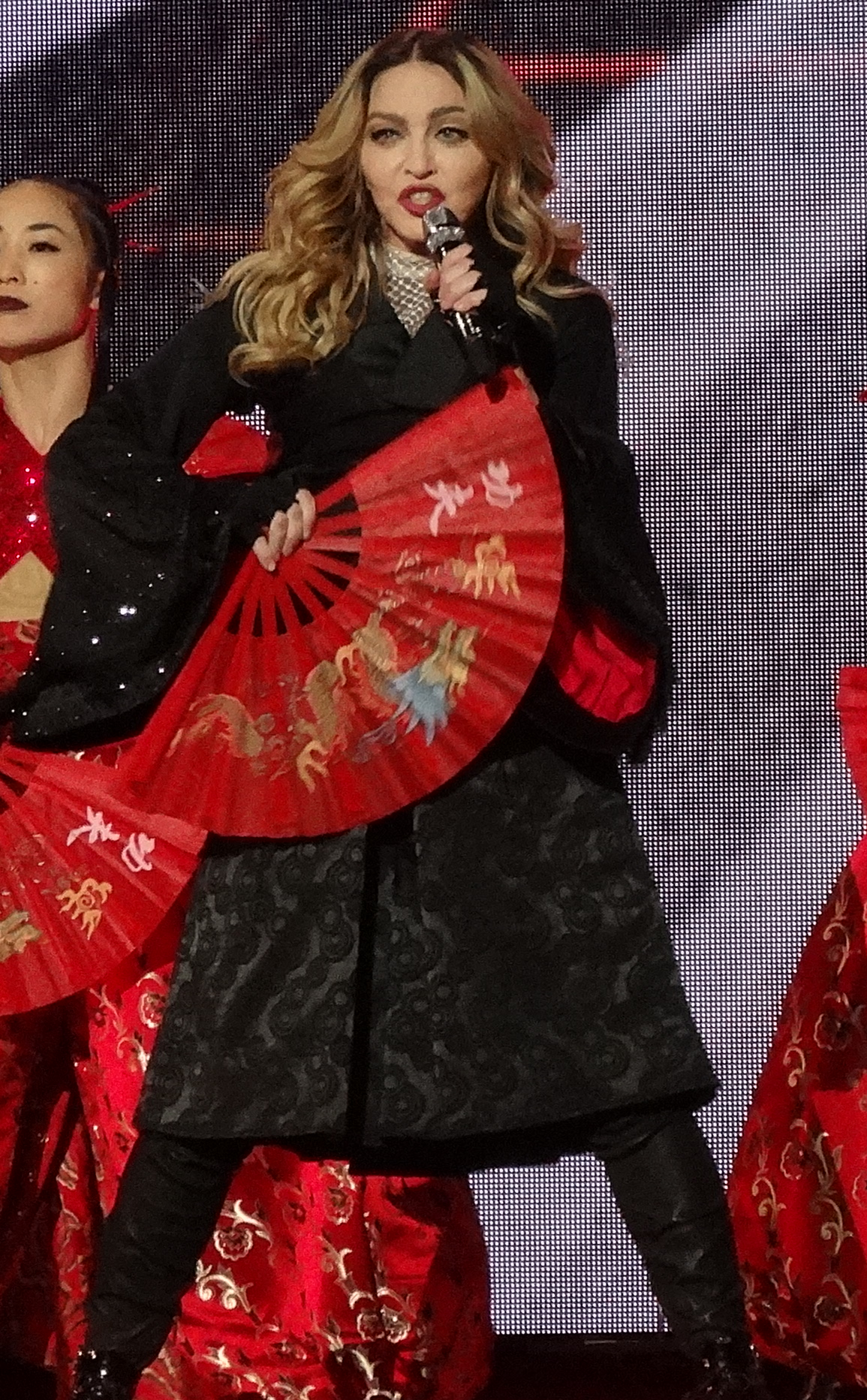
- Madonna performing "Bitch I'm Madonna" at the Rebel Heart Tour (2015–2016). The song's music video became her first clip to cross 100 million views on platform Vevo.
- Music videos: 84
- Concert tour videos: 11
- Documentary videos: 2
- Music video compilations: 4
- Music video box sets: 2
- Promotional video albums: 4
- Video singles: 4

American singer Madonna has released 84 music videos, eleven concert tour videos, two documentary videos, four music video compilations, two music video box sets, four promotional videos, and four video singles. Nicknamed as the "Queen of Videos" or "Queen of MTV", her music videos were often considered by critics as works of art, depicting various social issues. Her early videos also received a significant academic attention. Madonna has won 20 MTV Video Music Awards, including the 1986 Video Vanguard Award for which she became the first female honoree. In 2003, MTV named her "The Greatest Music Video Star Ever", saying "Madonna's innovation, creativity and contribution to the music video art form" is what puts her at the top of the list. In 2020, Billboard ranked her at the top of their list "100 Greatest Music Video Artists of All Time".

Madonna's first video, "Everybody" (1982), was a low-budget work. Her first video to receive attention on MTV was "Borderline", followed by "Lucky Star" and "Like a Virgin", which popularized Madonna's image and fashion among the younger generation. Her early videos were released commercially on Madonna (1984), which became the best-selling videocassette of 1985. With the title track from her third studio album True Blue (1986), Madonna's impact on MTV and popular music was established when a contest entitled Making My Video, was held to create a music video for the song. "La Isla Bonita" and "Who's That Girl", both released in 1987, showed Madonna's fascination with Hispanic culture and religious symbolism. In 1989, the video of "Like a Prayer" portrayed her dancing in front of burning crosses, receiving stigmata, kissing a black saint and having sex with him in a church altar. It faced strong reaction from religious groups and media. "Express Yourself" released the same year was critically appreciated for its positive feminist themes.

In 1990, Madonna released the video for the song "Vogue", showing the underground gay subculture dance routine called voguing, and the glamorous look of golden era Hollywood. She released her second video compilation, The Immaculate Collection (1990) to accompany the greatest hits album of the same name. She featured overtly sexual undertones with the videos of "Justify My Love" (1990) and "Erotica" (1992), which met with huge backlash. By this point, Madonna had sold between 3 and 4 million copies worldwide of her video releases. A toned down image of the singer appeared in the video for "Secret" from Bedtime Stories (1994). Inspired by paintings of Frida Kahlo and Remedios Varo, the music video of "Bedtime Story" is permanently displayed at the Museum of Modern Art in New York City. Madonna incorporated Asian culture in the videos of "Frozen" and "Nothing Really Matters" from her 1998 album Ray of Light. The video for its title track was a high-speed one, portraying Japanese people going through their daily lives, interspersed with Madonna in black denim dancing to the music. Most of her 1990s videos were released on The Video Collection 93:99.

Madonna reinvented her image as a cowgirl on the videos for "Music" and "Don't Tell Me" from her eighth studio album, Music (2000). Violence and vandalism were the themes of subsequent releases, "What It Feels Like for a Girl" (2001), "Die Another Day" (2002) and "American Life" (2003), the latter being pulled from release due to the Iraq war of 2003. "Hung Up", lead single from Confessions on a Dance Floor (2005) was a tribute to John Travolta and his movies. Madonna's videos for "Celebration" (2009), "Girl Gone Wild" (2012), and "Living for Love" (2015) were received favorably for paying homage to her past videos and a return to her dance roots.

Madonna's music videos continued to garner commercial interest in the streaming and digital eras. In 2019, "Vogue" became Madonna's fourth music video to reach over 100 million views on YouTube across four different decades, following "Bitch I'm Madonna" (2015), "Hung Up" (2005) and "La Isla Bonita" (1987), making her the first female artist in history to achieve this feat within the streaming era. She extended this record with "Popular". In April 2025, "La Isla Bonita", her most viewed music video on YouTube, surpassed 1 billion views.

== Music videos ==
=== 1980s ===
Title	Year	Director(s)	Description	Ref.
"Everybody"	1982	Ed Steinberg	An in-house video featuring Madonna singing with a group of dancers against a neon-lit background	
"Burning Up"	1983	Steve Barron	The video portrays Madonna, in a white dress, writhing on a road, singing the song about her lover, who drives a car around.	
"Holiday"	1984	Unknown	The video features the footage of Madonna performing at Solid Gold in 1984.	
"Lucky Star"	1984	Arthur Pierson	The video portrays Madonna in her boy-toy image, dancing in front of a white background, flanked by two dancers, one of whom is her brother, Christopher Ciccone. There are 2 versions of the video, a 4-minute and a 5-minute version.	
"Borderline"	1984	Mary Lambert	The video portrays Madonna as a young woman who is dancing in the streets when she catches the eye of a professional photographer. She leaves her boyfriend and goes with the photographer. After accidentally spray painting the photographer's car during a photo shoot, he yells at her and she returns to her boyfriend.	
"Like a Virgin"	1984	Mary Lambert	In the video, Madonna roams around the streets of Venice and through marble-pillared rooms wearing a white wedding dress; this clip is interspersed by images of a lion and a man wearing a lion mask. There is an alternate edit of the video with slight changes.	
"Material Girl"	1985	Mary Lambert	Pictured as a video-within-a-video, Madonna sings the song dressed up in a pink sleeveless gown, flanked by boys in black coats. The video imitated Marilyn Monroe's version of "Diamonds Are a Girl's Best Friend" from the 1953 film Gentlemen Prefer Blondes.	
"Crazy for You"	1985	Harold Becker	The music video consists of scenes from the film Vision Quest.	
"Angel"	1985	Warner Bros. Records (compilator)	The music video consists of scenes music videos of "Burning Up", "Borderline", "Lucky Star", "Like a Virgin" and "Material Girl".	
"Into the Groove"	1985	Susan Seidelman	The music video consists of scenes from the film Desperately Seeking Susan. There is an "Extended Version" of the video.	
"Dress You Up"	1985	Daniel Kleinman	To promote the Madonna Live: The Virgin Tour release, filmed in Detroit, the song's performance was released as music video.	
"Gambler"	1985	Harold Becker	The music video consists of scenes from the film Vision Quest.	
"Live to Tell"	1986	James Foley	The video portrays Madonna with a new pale and subtle look, her shoulder-length hair is wavy and golden blond. Footage from the film At Close Range is interspersed, with Madonna appearing to speak for the character.	
"Papa Don't Preach"	1986	James Foley	In this video, Madonna adopts the gamine look portrayed by Shirley MacLaine and Audrey Hepburn during the 1950s. She portrays a tomboy who wants to tell her father (played by Danny Aiello) about her pregnancy. Despite his concern and disappointment, they find reconciliation in the end. Interspersed with scenes of a sexier Madonna with a toned body, wearing a black bustier.	
"True Blue"	1986	James Foley	The American version from MTV's "Make My Video Contest" was directed by Ángel Gracia and Cliff Guest, where Madonna does not appear. The international release directed by Foley portrays Madonna and her friends in an all-blue colored diner.	
"Open Your Heart"	1986	Jean-Baptiste Mondino	The video pays homage to actresses Liza Minnelli and Marlene Dietrich. Madonna plays an exotic dancer in a peep-show club who befriends a little boy and escapes from there. There is an edit of the video with an alternate ending.	
"La Isla Bonita"	1987	Mary Lambert	Madonna plays a woman living in a Spanish barrio. She portrays two characters: a boyishly-dressed Catholic woman and a colorful Flamenco dancer. The video portrays Madonna's fascination with Hispanic culture and the inclusion of religious symbolism.	
"Who's That Girl"	1987	Peter Rosenthal	The video portrays Madonna dressed in Spanish style as a young lady in search of a treasure. It includes scenes from the film Who's That Girl.	
"The Look of Love"	1987	James Foley	The music video consists of scenes from the film Who's That Girl.	
"Like a Prayer"	1989	Mary Lambert	The video portrays Madonna to be a witness of an interracial murder and goes to pray in a church. Various scenes like Madonna kissing a black saint, receiving stigmata, scantily dressed and dancing in front of burning crosses are shown. In the end, she helps to free the man who is falsely accused of murder.	
"Express Yourself"	1989	David Fincher	Inspired by the film Metropolis, the video portrays Madonna as the leader of a company, and later as a glamorous lady and chained masochist. Muscular men act as her workers. In the end, Madonna picks one of them to be her date. The music video for "Express Yourself" was the most expensive video at the time of its release with production cost of $5 million. There are 2 versions of the video, the original uses the Shep Pettibone House Remix, while a later version released on DVD uses another Shep Pettibone remix similar to the album version.	
"Cherish"	1989	Herb Ritts	A black-and-white video showing Madonna playing on the beach with mermen and merchild. In the end she falls in love with one of the mermen.	
"Oh Father"	1989	David Fincher	A black-and-white video portraying the death scene of a young mother and the tempestuous relationship that ensues between the husband and the daughter. Years later Madonna, as the grown-up daughter, reconciles with the father at the woman's grave. There are censored and uncensored versions.	
"Dear Jessie"	1989	Derek Hayes	An animated video featuring Madonna as an animated fairy. Madonna does not appear in the video. The video was released in limited territories only outside the United States.	

=== 1990s ===
Title	Year	Director(s)	Description	Ref.
"Vogue"	1990	David Fincher	A black-and-white video recreating the glamorous look of old Hollywood with men in suits and Madonna dressed in gowns. It also displays the dance form called vogue.	
"Justify My Love"	1990	Jean-Baptiste Mondino	A black-and-white video portraying Madonna coming to a hotel room to satisfy her sexual fantasy. Scenes of sadomasochism, voyeurism and bisexuality are also portrayed. Censored and uncensored versions of the video exist.	
"This Used to Be My Playground"	1992	Alek Keshishian	The video is a walk-through of Madonna singing about the old days, as the viewer flips through a photo album featuring moving images of a singing Madonna as well as images from the film A League of Their Own.	
"Erotica"	1992	Fabien Baron	Madonna is portrayed as a masked dominatrix with a golden tooth and a whip. Montages of sexual imagery are shown that are shot during the photography of Madonna's Sex book. It is a montage of sexually charged images, designed to shock the audience. Censored and uncensored versions of the video exist.	
"Deeper and Deeper"	1992	Bobby Woods	Madonna portrays Warhol protégé Edie Sedgwick. She goes to a disco and looks for something which ends with a man releasing the balloons she is carrying. Interspersed with scenes of Madonna being photographed and she and her friends watching a man dancing in underwear. Censored and uncensored versions of the video exist.	
"Bad Girl"	1993	David Fincher	The video opens and closes with shots of a murdered Madonna, who, having lived a life of promiscuous sex, presumably joins her dead lover and guardian angel, portrayed by actor Christopher Walken. Censored and uncensored versions of the video exist.	
"Fever"	1993	Stéphane Sednaoui	The video portrays Madonna as a Balinese idol with red hair and another shot of her being silver painted. Interspersed with scenes of a man in thongs, his body painted gold. The audio used in the video is the "Edit One" remix instead of the original album version.	
"Rain"	1993	Mark Romanek	The video portrays Madonna with short cropped, black hair, recording the song in a studio. Interspersed with scenes of Madonna kissing a man behind a glass on which water falls.	
"I'll Remember"	1994	Alek Keshishian	Madonna singing the song in a recording studio, while being directed by an androgynous version of herself. The video is interspersed with clips from the film With Honors.	
"Secret"	1994	Melodie McDaniel	A black-and-white video featuring Madonna as a blues singer singing in a club. Scenes of rebirth, transvestites and damnation are interspersed with Madonna walking down a street to her home.	
"Take a Bow"	1994	Michael Haussman	Madonna portrays the mistress of a Spanish bullfighter. Their affair ends after Madonna is being abused by the fighter. Religious imagery forms the backbone of the video.	
"Bedtime Story"	1995	Mark Romanek	A surreal dream sequence arising from some sort of controlled experiment on a prostrate Madonna, lying in a blue spaceship-like room. The production cost of the video was $5 million, making it one of the costliest videos.	
"Human Nature"	1995	Jean-Baptiste Mondino	Madonna and her dancers in front of a white background, wearing black, PVC catsuits, perform a number of S&M-inspired dance moves.	
"I Want You" (with Massive Attack)	1995	Earle Sebastian	Madonna in an apartment and on a bed, longing for whomever, but not daring to phone him. A very slow black-and-white video.	
"You'll See" / "Veras"	1995	Michael Haussman	A sequel to the "Take a Bow" music video. Madonna leaves the bullfighter but he still chases her around the world. Ultimately she sets herself free from him. A Spanish version of the video released in Latin countries, "Veras" uses much of the same footage, but adds scenes of Madonna recording that version of the song in the studio.	
"Love Don't Live Here Anymore"	1996	Jean-Baptiste Mondino	The "single-shot" sepia-colored video shows Madonna in the middle of an empty suite of an abandoned hotel.	
"You Must Love Me"	1996	Alan Parker	Madonna was pregnant with her daughter Lourdes at the time of shooting the video. Her stomach was hidden behind a piano in the video. Interspersed with clips from the film Evita.	
"Don't Cry for Me Argentina"	1996	Alan Parker	The music video consists of scenes from the film Evita.	
"Frozen"	1998	Chris Cunningham	An all-blue video shot in the middle of Mojave Desert. Dressed in black clothing from head to foot, her long hair colored black and straight and mehndi on her hands, Madonna portrays a mystical creature and a witchy persona who sometimes turns into a dog, sometimes into a bird and sometimes levitates from the ground.	
"Ray of Light"	1998	Jonas Åkerlund	A high-speed video, showing ordinary people doing their daily routines. In between Madonna, dressed in casual jeans and flowing golden hair, dances to the song, ultimately falling asleep on a dance floor.	
"Drowned World/Substitute for Love"	1998	Walter Stern	Portrays Madonna running away from the paparazzi in a car. After reaching home, she takes her daughter in her arms.	
"The Power of Good-Bye"	1998	Matthew Rolston	Madonna and her lover play chess, and Madonna wins. After her lover reprimands her, Madonna goes out to the beach and starts walking along the shore, where she possibly commits suicide. There is an alternate version of the video.	
"Nothing Really Matters"	1999	Johan Renck	Japanese-themed video, featuring Madonna as a geisha wearing a red kimono and white clad Swedes of Asian heritage performing butoh dance moves.	
"Beautiful Stranger"	1999	Brett Ratner	Shot for the film Austin Powers: The Spy Who Shagged Me, the video features Madonna dancing in a club and actor Mike Myers as Austin Powers trying to seduce her; his plan ultimately backfiring.	

=== 2000s ===
Title	Year	Director(s)	Description	Ref.
"American Pie"	2000	Philipp Stölzl	Madonna sings the song in front of a giant flag of the United States. Interspersed with scenes which are characteristic of the American life. Actor Rupert Everett makes an appearance. There is a version of the video with scenes from The Next Best Thing and a version without film footage.	
"Music"	2000	Jonas Åkerlund	Madonna and her friends board a limousine which takes them to a strip-club and disco. The strippers are brought over in the limousine by Madonna and her friends. An animated section is present where Madonna fights with some goons. A short and long version of the video was released.	
"Don't Tell Me"	2000	Jean-Baptiste Mondino	The video shows Madonna walking on a conveyor belt in front of a video screen where cowboys are shown dancing. They join Madonna in front of the screen near the end of the video.	
"What It Feels Like for a Girl"	2001	Guy Ritchie	Madonna picks up an old woman from an old-age home and speeds down the streets with her in a car. While driving she commits a number of crimes, including theft, destruction of property and murder. The audio used in the video is the Above & Beyond remix instead of the original album version.	
"Die Another Day"	2002	Traktor	Features a heavily beaten-up Madonna being brought to be executed in a gas chamber. Interspersed with scenes of a white-dressed and black-dressed Madonna sword fighting. In the end Madonna escapes from the execution. The former's video was the second most expensive video, production cost being around $6 million.	
"American Life"	2003	Jonas Åkerlund	Original video showed Madonna among military-garbed models at a fashion show. Interspersed with shots of the catwalk was footage of explosions and planes dropping bombs. The regular version of the video ends with Madonna throwing what appears to be a grenade into the lap of a George W. Bush lookalike, but in the "Director's Cut" the grenade is just thrown onto the catwalk. However, due to its controversy, Madonna cancelled the premiere and made the edited version of the video that features her singing in front of the world's flags.	
"Hollywood"	2003	Jean-Baptiste Mondino	Madonna portrays some of Hollywood's former actresses and the upheaval of a glamorous life.	
"Me Against the Music" (Britney Spears featuring Madonna)	2003	Paul Hunter	Britney Spears and Madonna are shown in a club, playing opposite characters with Britney in the dark and Madonna in the white. A cat-and-mouse like chase ensues; Spears catches up to Madonna in the end. Two remix versions of the video were used for promotional purposes only.	
"Love Profusion"	2004	Luc Besson	Madonna walks on the sky and on the water with fairies, fishes, flowers and clouds surrounding her.	
"Hung Up"	2005	Johan Renck	The video portrays Madonna clad in a pink leotard dancing alone in a ballet studio and concludes at a gaming parlour where she dances with her backup troupe. Interspersed are scenes of people displaying their dancing skills in a variety of settings.	
"Sorry"	2006	Jamie King	A continuation from the "Hung Up" music video. Madonna and her troupe go around the town in a white van and dance in a skating arena. There is a "Director's Cut" version of the video.	
"Get Together"	2006	Eugene Riecansky	The video shows Madonna singing the song among graphical visuals portraying volcanoes erupting and a cityscape. Another animated "European Version" of the video was also released.	
"Jump"	2006	Jonas Åkerlund & Brett Capseed	The video features Madonna in a blond bob wig and singing the song in front of several neon signs. The video also features dancers performing the physical discipline parkour.	
"Hey You"	2007	Madonna & Johan Söderberg	Devastating images of people being displaced by climate change to inspire action. First shown on the backdrop screen of Madonna's Live Earth performance, then released on her YouTube channel.	
"4 Minutes" (featuring Justin Timberlake and Timbaland)	2008	Jonas & François	Madonna and Timberlake sing and run away from a giant black screen that devours everything in its path. At the end of the video, Madonna and Timberlake are consumed by the screen.	
"Give It 2 Me"	2008	Tom Munro; Nathan Rissman	Madonna in retro-makeup look dancing in a photography studio in various garments. Cameo appearance by Pharrell Williams.	
"Miles Away"	2009	Nathan Rissman	Live performance from Sticky & Sweet Tour in Buenos Aires, mostly footage of the fans and stadium before and during the show. Originally unreleased, but finally included on the DVD release Celebration: The Video Collection.	
"Celebration"	2009	Jonas Åkerlund	A simple dance video featuring Madonna and her dancers doing the popping and locking style of dancing against black-and-white backgrounds. The audio used in the video is the Benny Benassi remix instead of the original album version. The alternate "Fan Version" of the video has a cameo by Madonna's daughter, Lourdes Leon.	

=== 2010s ===
Title	Year	Director(s)	Description	Ref.
"Give Me All Your Luvin'" (featuring Nicki Minaj and M.I.A.)	2012	Megaforce	The video shows Nicki Minaj and M.I.A. (who are featured in the song), in cheerleader outfits cheering on Madonna, who wears a black outfit for most of the video. It then leads into a scene where Madonna, Minaj, and M.I.A. are all dressed as Marilyn Monroe.	
"Girl Gone Wild"	2012	Mert and Marcus	The black-and-white video opens with Madonna with a retro-glam look, followed by scenes of her against a stark white background, erotic scenes with shirtless / nude male models (Sean O'Pry, Simon Nessman, Jon Kortajarena), and a dance sequence with heeled male dancers (Kazaky). Censored and uncensored versions of the video exist.	
"Turn Up the Radio"	2012	Tom Munro	After a successful escape from the paparazzi, Madonna rides through Florence, Italy, picking up the best looking men on the roadside. Censored and uncensored versions of the video exist.	
"Living for Love"	2015	J.A.C.K.	Madonna dressed as a bullfighter performs a battle inspired choreography where she confronts and tames a number of male minotaurs.	
"Ghosttown"	2015	Jonas Åkerlund	Set in a post-nuclear destroyed city, the video shows Madonna as a survivor searching through the destruction, when she meets another man, played by actor Terrence Howard.	
"Bitch I'm Madonna" (featuring Nicki Minaj)	2015	Jonas Åkerlund	The "one-shot" colorful video shows Madonna in a party, dancing and interacting with the partygoers. Many celebrities appear in the video, some in the real footage (Rita Ora, Diplo, Chris Rock, Alexander Wang and Madonna's sons Rocco and David), while others (Katy Perry, Miley Cyrus, Beyoncé and Kanye West) were added separately. Nicki Minaj appears on a screen at the party while she is rapping.	
"Medellín" (with Maluma)	2019	Diana Kunst and Mau Morgó	Madonna, as her persona Madame X, is a Cha-cha dance instructor who teaches Maluma in a class and is then shown dancing on a table at a Latin-style celebration. The video also features horseback riding, a chase sequence, and Madonna with Maluma in bed drinking Champagne.	
"Crave" (with Swae Lee)	2019	Nuno Xico	After releasing pigeons from the roof of a New York City housing block, Madonna comes to meet Swae Lee. The two reach out to each other's hands which are surged with electricity.	
"Dark Ballet"	2019	Emmanuel Adjei	Mykki Blanco, as Joan of Arc, is imprisoned and burned alive by religious authorities. One scene sees him dancing the "dark ballet" while wearing a cone bra.	
"God Control"	2019	Jonas Åkerlund	On the same day of a fictional school shooting in Arizona, at night Madonna goes to a disco party with her friends at Studio 54. They are having fun dancing until they become dead victims from a mass shooting in which the gunman shoots himself after he commits his crime. The plot is narrated in reverse order. News footage of gun control protests and gun shows are shown intertwined at the end of the video, and a message of demanding immediate gun control is conveyed.	
"I Rise"	2019	Peter Matkiwksy	Madonna partnered with Time Studios to create a music video for the song. Madonna herself does not appear in the video, but it instead shows footage of the Stoneman Douglas High School shooting survivors, LGBTQ supporters, women's rights protesters, Olympic gymnast Aly Raisman's testimony about sexual abuse, Filipino journalist Maria Ressa's arrest, among other social justice movements.	
"Batuka"	2019	Emmanuel Adjei	Madonna and The Batukadeiras Orchestra sing and dance together next to the sea. The video references the slave ships which are believed to have brought the first slaves to Cape Verde in the 16th century. The distant ghost slave ships disappear as the women pray them away with the storm.	

=== 2020s ===
Title	Year	Director(s)	Description	Ref.
"Levitating" (The Blessed Madonna remix) (Dua Lipa featuring Madonna and Missy Elliott)	2020	Will Hooper	Numerous people getting obsessed with a maze-like symbol while under the influence of a mysterious glowing planet. Madonna does not appear in the music video.	
"Frozen" (Fireboy DML Remix)	2022	Ricardo Gomes	Madonna and Fireboy DML dance and sing in front of backdrop screen videos, representing respectively ice and fire. "Frozen" was remixed by Sickick.	
"Frozen" (featuring 070 Shake)	2022	Ryan Drake; Ricardo Gomes	Madonna and 070 Shake dance and sing in a factory. "Frozen" was remixed by Sickick.	
"Hung Up on Tokischa" (featuring Tokischa)	2022	Sasha Kasiuha	Madonna and Tokischa dance and sing in front an altar, at a house party and outside in the city. Madonna wears a flowing pink tracksuit with ginger hair as a nod to the original video.	
"Popular" (with the Weeknd and Playboi Carti)	2024	Cliqua	The video's shots mix between The Weeknd dancing and drinking in Hatfield House, Madonna dancing and rolling around on a sofa in a high-rise apartment. Playboi Carti sits and dances around an expensive car. The video premiered exclusively on the streaming gaming platform Fortnite.	
"Bring Your Love" (with Sabrina Carpenter)	2026	TORSO	The video is an expansion of the Confessions II film which features a snippet of the song. Madonna rolled up in a long carpet that's pushed down the dance floor, with her popping up after it's fully unfurled. The rest of the clip finds Madonna and Carpenter moving through the packed, sweaty crowd, trying to avoid the floating cameraman spying on the crowd.	

=== Cameo appearances and depictions ===
Title	Artist	Year	Director(s)	Description	Ref.
"God Is a Woman"	Ariana Grande	2018	Dave Meyers	In between several religious imagery, Madonna appears voice-only as God and delivers a modified Ezekiel 25:17 quote from the 1994 film Pulp Fiction, with Ariana Grande miming the words and throwing a hammer to break the ceiling of a grand hall.	
"Gang Signs"	Snoop Dogg	2021	4rAx	Madonna briefly appears, smoking and blowing the smoke of her cigarette into the camera, whilst dancing in her room.	
"Nothing Lasts Forever"	Sevdaliza & Grimes	2023	Willem Kantine	Accompanied by A$AP Ferg, Julia Fox and the track artists, Madonna's face is cropped onto a muscular woman's body. In a warehouse, Madonna's character flexes her muscles and goes on the computer.	

== Video albums ==
=== Concert tour videos ===
Title	Release details	Peak chart positions										Certifications
Title	Release details	US	AUS	BRA	FRA	GER	NLD	SPA	SWE	SWI	UK	Certifications
Madonna Live: The Virgin Tour	Released: November 13, 1985; Studio: Boy Toy, Inc.; Label: Warner Music Video; Format: VHS · Laserdisc	1	—	—	—	—	—	—	—	—	1	US: Platinum; AUS: Platinum
Who's That Girl: Live in Japan	Released: November 26, 1987; Studio: Boy Toy, Inc.; Label: Warner-Pioneer Japan · Warner Reprise Video; Format: VHS · Laserdisc	—	—	—	—	—	—	—	—	—	—	
Ciao Italia: Live from Italy	Released: May 24, 1988; Studio: Boy Toy, Inc.; Label: Warner Reprise Video; Format: VHS · Laserdisc · DVD · VCD	1	—	—	—	—	—	9	—	—	1	US: Platinum
Blond Ambition: Japan Tour 90	Released: July 25, 1990; Studio: Music Guide, Inc.; Label: Warner-Pioneer Japan; Format: VHS · Laserdisc	—	—	—	—	—	—	—	—	—	—	
Blond Ambition World Tour Live	Released: December 13, 1990; Studio: Boy Toy, Inc.; Label: Pioneer Artists; Format: Laserdisc	2 (Note: Top Video Sales/Top Videodisc Sales)	—	—	—	—	—	—	17	—	—	
The Girlie Show: Live Down Under	Released: April 26, 1994; Studio: Music Tours, Inc.; Label: Warner Reprise Video · Warner Music Vision; Format: VHS · DVD · Laserdisc · VCD	3	—	—	—	—	—	8	—	—	1	US: Gold; AUS: 3× Platinum; BRA: Gold; UK: Platinum
Drowned World Tour 2001	Released: November 13, 2001; Studio: Cream Cheese Films, Tadpole Films; Label: Warner Reprise Video · Warner Music Vision; Format: VHS · DVD · VCD	1	4	—	—	—	1	5	3	6	1	US: Platinum; AUS: Platinum; BRA: Platinum; FRA: 2× Platinum; UK: Platinum
The Confessions Tour	Released: January 26, 2007; Studio: Semtex Films; Label: Warner Bros. · Warner Music Vision; Format: CD+DVD · DVD · Digital download	1	1	—	—	—	1	1	1	1	—	AUS: Platinum; BRA: Gold; GER: 2× Platinum
Sticky & Sweet Tour	Released: March 26, 2010; Studio: Semtex Films; Label: Warner Bros.; Format: CD+DVD · Blu-ray · Blu-ray+CD · Digital download	1	3	—	—	—	—	—	—	—	—	AUS: Gold; GER: Gold
MDNA World Tour	Released: September 6, 2013; Studio: Semtex Films; Label: Live Nation · Interscope; Format: DVD · DVD+2CD · Blu-ray · Digital download	1	1	1	1	—	1	1	1	1	1	BRA: 3× Platinum
Rebel Heart Tour	Released: September 15, 2017; Studio: Semtex Films; Label: Eagle Vision; Format: DVD · Blu-ray · DVD+CD · Blu-ray+CD · Digital download	2	1	—	1	2	1	1	1	1	1	FRA: Platinum

=== Documentary videos ===
Title	Release details	Peak chart positions										Certifications
Title	Release details	US	AUS	BRA	FRA	GER	NLD	SPA	SWE	SWI	UK	Certifications
Madonna: Truth or Dare (aka In Bed with Madonna)	Released: October 9, 1991; Studio: Boy Toy, Inc. · Miramax Films · Dino de Laurentiis; Label: LIVE · Artisan · Video Collection · MGM · Lionsgate; Format: VHS · Laserdisc · VCD · DVD · Blu-ray	6	—	—	—	—	—	—	—	—	6	GER: Gold; UK: Platinum
I'm Going to Tell You a Secret	Released: June 20, 2006; Studio: Maverick Films · River Road · Lucky Lou; Label: Warner Bros. · Warner Music Vision; Format: CD+DVD · DVD+CD · Digital download	1	1	—	—	—	2	1	1	—	1	AUS: Platinum; BRA: Gold; GER: Gold; SPA: Platinum; UK: Gold

=== Music video compilations ===
Title	Release details	Peak chart positions										Certifications
Title	Release details	US	AUS	BRA	FRA	GER	NLD	SPA	SWE	SWI	UK	Certifications
Madonna	Released: November 1984; Label: Warner Music Video; Format: VHS · Laserdisc	1	—	—	—	—	—	—	—	—	1	US: Platinum; AUS: Platinum
The Immaculate Collection	Released: November 13, 1990; Label: Warner Reprise Video · Warner Music Vision; Format: VHS · Laserdisc · DVD · VCD	1	—	—	—	—	—	—	—	—	1	US: 3× Platinum; AUS: 3× Platinum; BRA: Gold; GER: Gold; UK: Platinum
The Video Collection 93:99	Released: November 9, 1999; Label: Warner Reprise Video · Warner Music Vision; Format: VHS · DVD · VCD	3	—	—	—	—	—	14	—	—	1	US: Platinum; BRA: Gold; UK: 2× Platinum
Celebration: The Video Collection	Released: September 29, 2009; Label: Warner Bros.; Format: DVD · Digital download	1	1	—	—	—	1	1	1	1	23	US: Platinum; AUS: Platinum; BRA: 2× Platinum; FRA: 2× Platinum

=== Music video box sets ===
Title	Release details	Peak positions			Certifications
Title	Release details	SPA	SWI	UK	Certifications
The Ultimate Collection	Contains: The Immaculate Collection and The Video Collection 93:99; Released: September 18, 2000; Label: Warner Reprise Video · Warner Music Vision; Format: VHS · DVD	5	4	4	AUS: Gold; UK: Gold
The Madonna Collection	Released in Japan as Madonna: Millennium Giants 3-Video Box Set; Contains: Madonna Live: The Virgin Tour, The Immaculate Collection and The Girlie Show: Live Down Under; Released: September 2000; Label: Warner Reprise Video · Warner Music Vision; Format: VHS	—	—	—	

=== Promotional videos ===
Title	Release details
It's That Girl	Released: September 1987; Label: Sire · WEA Records UK; Format: VHS · Cassette
She's Breathless	Released: July 1990; Label: Sire · WEA Records UK; Format: VHS · Cassette
Rays of Light	Released: 1999; Label: Maverick · Warner Music UK; Format: VHS
GHV2	Released: November 2001; Label: Maverick · Warner Music UK; Format: VHS

== Video singles ==
Title	Release details	Peak positions			Certifications
Title	Release details	US	AUS	UK	Certifications
"Justify My Love"	Released: December 7, 1990; Label: Warner Music Vision; Format: VHS	2	—	—	AUS: Gold; US: 4× Platinum
"Ray of Light"	Released: June 23, 1998; Label: Warner Music Vision; Format: VHS	4	—	—	
"Music"	Released: September 5, 2000; Label: Warner Music Vision; Format: DVD	3	—	1	US: Gold; UK: Gold
"What It Feels Like for a Girl"	Released: April 24, 2001; Label: Warner Music Vision; Format: VHS · DVD	2	10	1	

== See also ==
- Madonna albums discography
- Madonna singles discography
- List of most expensive music videos
- List of most-watched television broadcasts
- Censorship on MTV
