= Celebration: The Video Collection =

Video by Madonna
- Released: September 29, 2009
- Recorded: 1983–2009
- Length: 211:00
- Label: Warner Bros.

Madonna video chronology
The Confessions Tour (2007)	Celebration: The Video Collection (2009)	Sticky & Sweet Tour (2010)

Celebration: The Video Collection is a greatest videos DVD compilation by American singer-songwriter Madonna. Released by Warner Bros. Records on September 29, 2009, the release accompanied the greatest hits compilation Celebration (2009). The collection follows on from her other greatest videos compilations The Immaculate Collection (1990) and The Video Collection 93:99 (1999). The release of the DVD was announced in July 2009 and contained videos spanning Madonna's entire career from 1983 to 2009.

Contemporary critics gave mixed reviews of the DVD. Some were disappointed with the low quality and the lack of clarity of the videos, while others praised the collection for being a reminder of Madonna as the visual artist. Celebration: The Video Collection debuted at the top of the Billboard Top Music Videos and the top of the DVD charts in Australia, Czech Republic, Hungary, Spain and Switzerland. It was certified platinum by the Recording Industry Association of America (RIAA) for shipment of 100,000 copies across United States.

== Background ==
On March 18, 2009, Madonna's publicist Liz Rosenberg announced the plans for the release of a greatest hits package by September. On July 22, 2009, Warner Bros. Records officially announced the release date as September 28, 2009 and confirmed the name of the album as Celebration through Madonna's official website, adding that a DVD containing Madonna's best music videos would also be released. According to the official press statement, the DVD included unedited and never before seen footage of "Justify My Love", as well as the completed video of the single "Celebration". The music videos included on the DVD were selected by Madonna and her fans through her official website Icon. The cover for Celebration was created by street pop artist Mr. Brainwash who is best known for "throwing modern cultural icons into a blender and turning it up to eleven". The compilation included the music videos of "Burning Up", "Into the Groove", "True Blue", "Who's That Girl", "Erotica", "Deeper and Deeper", "I Want You", "I'll Remember" and "American Pie", which were previously never included in any of Madonna's DVDs. It also included the award-winning music videos – "Like a Virgin", "Papa Don't Preach", "Open Your Heart", "Like a Prayer", "Express Yourself", "Vogue", "Rain", "Take a Bow", "Frozen", "Ray of Light", "Beautiful Stranger", "Music", "Don't Tell Me" and "Hung Up". "Justify My Love" and "Erotica" were banned by MTV for their sexually provocative themes. The video is presented in 4:3 aspect ratio, with the widescreen videos windowboxed.

== Reception ==
=== Critical response ===
Professional ratings
Review scores
Source	Rating
AllMusic	4.5/5 stars
Pitchfork	5.7/10

Douglas Wolk from Pitchfork Media commented that the DVD was "a lot closer to the mark [of celebrating Madonna's career]. A lot of the fun of her career has always been its visual side." Don Shewey from Rolling Stone said, "The video exemplified the fact that there's no-one like Madonna, who can turn the music video in to an art-form." Chad Presley from Blogcritics felt that, "There's a healthy dose of nostalgia involved in watching these videos for anyone who grew up during the 1980s in particular. [...] The video quality is a mixed bag. Most of the visual problems crop up during the earlier clips, which were photographed on much more primitive equipment. [...] All things considered, especially when viewed on a Blu-ray player and hi-def TV, this is a pretty rough looking set. Even some of the later videos have an excess of visual noise and are lacking in sharpness." Monica Herrera from Billboard was not impressed with the collection and was disappointed with the "dull quality of the videos. The collection is a probable shame in Madonna's catalogue, but a great one for her fans." Bönz Malone from Spin said, "Celebration: The Video Collection is a reminder that Madonna is, and always will be, a true video artist. You cannot ignore her contribution to the music video art form." Tim Sendra from Allmusic gave the DVD four and a half stars out of five, and commented that "it is indeed a celebration of Madonna's career and some of the most celebratory and thrilling pop music ever created."

=== Commercial performance ===
Celebration: The Video Collection debuted at the top of the Billboard Top Music Videos for the issue dated October 12, 2009, replacing Beyoncé's live release I Am... Yours: An Intimate Performance at Wynn Las Vegas. It remained on the top of the music video chart for five weeks. The DVD was certified platinum by the Recording Industry Association of America (RIAA) for shipment of 50,000 copies. According to Nielsen Soundscan, the DVD has sold 60,000 copies in United States as of December 2010 and placed at number 30 on the year-end DVD chart for 2009.

On October 5, 2009, the DVD debuted at the top of the ARIA Top 40 Music DVD chart in Australia with 2,300 copies in its first-week, replacing Believe Again: Australian Tour 2009 by Delta Goodrem. After two weeks on the top, Celebration: The Video Collection was replaced by Funhouse Tour: Live in Australia by Pink. The collection was present on the DVD chart for twenty weeks, and ranked at twenty on the Australian Highest Selling Music DVD chart for 2009. The DVD debuted at the top of the Hungarian Top 20 DVD chart on September 27, 2009, and was present for one week on the top. In Czech Republic, the DVD debuted at the top of the DVD chart on October 14, 2009, replacing Madonna's compilation album Celebration. Celebration: The Video Collection also received a two-times platinum certification in France, for shipment of 30,000 copies of the video.

== Track listing and formats ==
Celebration: The Video Collection – DVD 1
No.	Title	Writer(s)	Director(s)	Length
1.	"Burning Up"	Madonna	Steve Barron	3:40
2.	"Lucky Star"	Madonna	Arthur Pierson	4:01
3.	"Borderline"	Reggie Lucas	Mary Lambert	3:56
4.	"Like a Virgin"	Tom Kelly; Billy Steinberg	Lambert	3:48
5.	"Material Girl"	Peter Brown; Robert Rans	Lambert	4:43
6.	"Crazy for You"	John Bettis; Jon Lind	Harold Becker	3:59
7.	"Into the Groove"	Madonna; Stephen Bray	Susan Seidelman	3:50
8.	"Live to Tell"	Madonna; Patrick Leonard	James Foley	4:24
9.	"Papa Don't Preach"	Brian Elliot (additional lyrics by Madonna)	Foley	5:06
10.	"True Blue"	Madonna; Bray	Foley	4:02
11.	"Open Your Heart"	Madonna; Gardner Cole; Peter Rafelson	Jean-Baptiste Mondino	4:28
12.	"La Isla Bonita"	Madonna; Leonard; Bruce Gaitsch	Lambert	3:59
13.	"Who's That Girl"	Madonna; Leonard	Peter Rosenthal	3:44
14.	"Like a Prayer"	Madonna; Leonard	Lambert	5:43
15.	"Express Yourself"	Madonna; Bray	David Fincher	4:59
16.	"Cherish"	Madonna; Leonard	Herb Ritts	4:38
17.	"Vogue"	Madonna; Shep Pettibone	Fincher	4:51
18.	"Justify My Love"	Lenny Kravitz; Ingrid Chavez (additional lyrics by Madonna)	Mondino	4:57
19.	"Erotica"	Madonna; Pettibone; Anthony Shimkin	Fabien Baron	5:18
20.	"Deeper and Deeper"	Madonna; Pettibone; Shimkin	Bobby Woods	5:49
21.	"Rain"	Madonna; Pettibone	Mark Romanek	4:33
22.	"I'll Remember"	Madonna; Leonard; Richard Page	Alek Keshishian	4:19

Celebration: The Video Collection – DVD 2
No.	Title	Writer(s)	Director(s)	Length
1.	"Secret"	Madonna; Dallas Austin; Pettibone	Melodie McDaniel	4:23
2.	"Take a Bow"	Madonna; Kenneth "Babyface" Edmonds	Michael Haussman	4:33
3.	"Bedtime Story"	Nellee Hooper; Björk; Marius De Vries	Romanek	4:24
4.	"Human Nature"	Madonna; Dave Hall; Shawn McKenzie; Kevin McKenzie; Michael Deering	Mondino	4:33
5.	"I Want You"	Leon Ware; Arthur Ross	Earle Sebastian	6:21
6.	"You'll See"	Madonna; David Foster	Haussman	4:18
7.	"Frozen"	Madonna; Leonard	Chris Cunningham	5:20
8.	"Ray of Light"	Madonna; William Orbit; Clive Maldoon; Dave Curtiss; Christine Ann Leach	Jonas Åkerlund	5:06
9.	"The Power of Good-Bye"	Madonna; Rick Nowels	Matthew Rolston	4:09
10.	"Beautiful Stranger"	Madonna; Orbit	Brett Ratner	4:38
11.	"American Pie"	Don McLean	Philipp Stölzl	4:34
12.	"Music"	Madonna; Mirwais Ahmadzaï	Åkerlund	4:44
13.	"Don't Tell Me"	Madonna; Ahmadzaï; Joe Henry	Mondino	4:38
14.	"What It Feels Like for a Girl"	Madonna; Guy Sigsworth; David Tom	Guy Ritchie	4:28
15.	"Die Another Day"	Madonna; Ahmadzaï	Traktor	4:27
16.	"Hollywood"	Madonna; Ahmadzaï	Mondino	3:58
17.	"Love Profusion"	Madonna; Ahmadzaï	Luc Besson	3:48
18.	"Hung Up"	Madonna; Stuart Price; Benny Andersson; Björn Ulvaeus	Johan Renck	5:25
19.	"Sorry"	Madonna; Price	Jamie King	4:43
20.	"Get Together"	Madonna; Anders Bagge; Peer Astrom; Price	Eugene Riecansky	3:55
21.	"Jump"	Madonna; Henry; Price	Åkerlund	3:23
22.	"4 Minutes"	Madonna; Timothy Mosley; Justin Timberlake; Nathaniel Hills	Jonas & François	4:04
23.	"Give It 2 Me"	Madonna; Pharrell Williams	Tom Munro	4:12
24.	"Miles Away"	Madonna; Mosley; Timberlake; Hills	Nathan Rissman	3:49
25.	"Celebration"	Madonna; Paul Oakenfold; Ian Green; Ciaran Gribbin	Åkerlund	3:52

Celebration: The Video Collection / Celebration – iTunes Store deluxe video edition
No.	Title	Length
1.	"Lucky Star"	4:02
2.	"Borderline"	3:57
3.	"Like a Virgin"	3:49
4.	"Material Girl"	4:43
5.	"Crazy for You"	3:58
6.	"Papa Don't Preach"	5:07
7.	"Open Your Heart"	4:27
8.	"La Isla Bonita"	4:00
9.	"Like a Prayer"	5:37
10.	"Express Yourself"	5:01
11.	"Cherish"	4:38
12.	"Vogue"	4:52
13.	"Justify My Love"	4:58
14.	"Erotica"	5:13
15.	"Rain"	4:35
16.	"Take a Bow"	4:35
17.	"You'll See"	4:20
18.	"Frozen"	5:22
19.	"Ray of Light"	5:07
20.	"The Power of Good-Bye"	4:11
21.	"Music"	4:46
22.	"Don't Tell Me"	4:38
23.	"What It Feels Like for a Girl"	4:30
24.	"Hung Up"	5:27
25.	"Sorry"	4:47
26.	"Get Together"	3:57
27.	"Jump"	3:24
28.	"4 Minutes"	4:05
29.	"Give It 2 Me"	4:13
30.	"Celebration"	3:41

Notes

- The nudity in "Justify My Love" and "Erotica" has been censored by black bars.

=== Formats ===
The DVD collection has been released in two different versions — both of them double-disc releases.

- Keep case — DVD-size packaging
- DVD Digipak — CD-size packaging
- iTunes Store digital download — deluxe video edition of Celebration with 68 tracks, including 38 audio tracks and 30 music videos

== Charts ==
Chart (2009)	Peak position
Australian Music DVD (ARIA)	1
Austrian Music DVD (Ö3 Austria)	1
Belgian Music DVD (Ultratop Flanders)	1
Belgian Music DVD (Ultratop Wallonia)	1
Czech Music DVD (ČNS IFPI)	1
Danish Music DVD (Hitlisten)	1
Dutch Music DVD (MegaCharts)	1
Finnish Music DVD (Suomen virallinen lista)	1
French Music DVD (SNEP)	1
Hungarian Music DVD (Mahasz)	1
Italian Music DVD (FIMI)	1
Japanese Music DVD (Oricon)	7
New Zealand Music DVD (RMNZ)	3
Portuguese Music DVD (AFP)	1
Spanish Music DVD (Promusicae)	1
Swedish Music DVD (Sverigetopplistan)	1
Swiss Music DVD (Schweizer Hitparade)	1
UK Music Videos (Official Charts)	23
US Music Video Sales (Billboard)	1

=== Monthly charts ===
Chart (2010)	Peak Position
Argentine Music DVD (CAPIF) Keep case edition (DVD Amaray)	8

=== Year-end charts ===
Chart (2009)	Peak position
Australian Music DVD (ARIA)	20
Dutch Music DVD (MegaCharts)	28
Finnish Music DVD (IFPI Finland)	2
French Music DVD (SNEP)	13
Italian Music DVD (FIMI)	6
Portuguese Music DVD (AFP)	16
Swedish Music DVD (Sverigetopplistan)	19
US Music Video Sales (Billboard)	30

Chart (2010)	Peak position
Swedish Music DVD (Sverigetopplistan)	90

== Certifications and sales ==
Region	Certification	Certified units/sales
Australia (ARIA)	Platinum	15,000^{^}
Brazil (Pro-Música Brasil)	2× Platinum	60,000^{*}
Finland	—	3,191
France (SNEP)	2× Platinum	30,000^{*}
Poland (ZPAV)	Gold	5,000^{*}
Portugal (AFP)	Gold	4,000^{^}
United States (RIAA)	Platinum	100,000^{^}
^{*} Sales figures based on certification alone.^{^} Shipments figures based on certification alone.

== Release history ==
Country	Date	Format
Brazil	September 21, 2009	DVD
Germany	September 25, 2009	DVD
Australia	September 28, 2009	DVD
Portugal	September 28, 2009	DVD
United Kingdom	September 29, 2009	DVD
United States	September 29, 2009	DVD
