= The Video Collection 93:99 =

Video by Madonna
- Released: November 9, 1999
- Recorded: January 1993 – May 1999
- Genre: Pop
- Length: 66:46
- Labels: Warner Vision; Warner Bros.
- Directors: David Fincher; Stéphane Sednaoui; Mark Romanek; Melodie McDaniel; Michael Haussman; Jean-Baptiste Mondino; Chris Cunningham; Jonas Åkerlund; Walter Stern; Matthew Rolston; Johan Renck; Brett Ratner
- Producer: David May

Madonna video chronology
| The Girlie Show: Live Down Under (1994) | The Video Collection 93:99 (1999) | Drowned World Tour 2001 (2001) |

The Video Collection 93:99 is the third music video compilation by American singer-songwriter Madonna. Released by Warner Music Vision, Warner Reprise Video and Warner Bros. Records on November 9, 1999, it contained music videos for singles released between 1993 and 1999. Originally, the collection was titled The Video Collection 92–99, and had included the 1992 video "Erotica", but it was omitted due to its sexually explicit content; instead the 1998 song "The Power of Good-Bye" was added. The videos in the collection were selected personally by Madonna, who felt the 14 videos to be her best work.

After its release, the collection was critically appreciated, with one group of reviewers noting the artistic capabilities of Madonna while the others noting her ability to re-invent her image from one video to another. It reached a peak of eight on Billboard's Top Music Video sales chart. In 2008, was certified platinum in the United States by the Recording Industry Association of America (RIAA) for shipment of 100,000 copies across United States. A box set titled The Ultimate Collection was released in 2000, which contained The Video Collection 93:99 and The Immaculate Collection compilations.

== Background ==
On September 2, 1999, Warner Bros. Records announced the release of the video album, then titled as The Video Collection 92–99. Released in VHS and DVD, the collection featured 14 videos, including "Drowned World/Substitute for Love", which was not released in the United States as a single, hence was not commercially available prior to the release of Video Collection. The videos in the collection was selected personally by Madonna, who felt the 14 videos to be her best work. The collection had included the 1992 song "Erotica", but it was later omitted due to the sexual content present in the music video; instead the song "The Power of Good-Bye" was added and the collection was renamed as The Video Collection 93:99.

The video release was supposed to be in mid-October, but was pushed to November 2, 1999. The DVD release was to also include an accompanying compact disc with the audio to the videos as a double-disc greatest hits album, but was cancelled and the release only included a DVD. The original plan was to have the release coincide with a 1999 concert tour, which Madonna had mentioned in an interview with Larry King that same year. This was also cancelled and postponed until 2001, Madonna instead releasing an audio greatest hits collection GHV2 and embarked on the Drowned World Tour that same year.

== Critical reception ==
Professional ratings
Review scores
| Source | Rating |
|---|---|
| AllMusic | 5/5 stars |

Heather Phares from AllMusic gave it five out of five stars and said: "Madonna's Video Collection: 1993–1999 adds to her status as one of the best represented artists on DVD. [...] Though it doesn't offer much in the way of DVD-specific features, the artistry of directors like Mark Romanek, Stephane Sedaoui, David Fincher, Jean-Baptiste Mondino, as well as Madonna herself, is on full display with videos like 'Take a Bow', 'Bedtime Story', 'Human Nature', 'Frozen', and 'Ray of Light'. All in all, it's a worthwhile collection of memorable videos from one of pop's trendsetters." Francis Dass from New Straits Times commented: "Madonna, the pop icon of the 20th century, remains at the forefront of self-promotion and marketing with the release of her music video compilation on VCD format. The collection shows that she is still able to maintain her relevance to the nasty world of music and she is still the queen of re-invention." Eileen Fitzpatrick from Billboard described the compilation as "a gorgeous waterfall of clips that flow from one to the next". She concludes her review saying "Madonna's ever-evolving vocals make this one a true gem".

Jay Webb from The Dallas Morning News felt that the videos on the collection showed "Madonna's true artistic self" but added that such artistic phase was incompletely catalogued in the collection. Jeremy Kinser from The Advocate gave the collection a positive review, complimenting "the showcase of such classic and artistic videos". He listed "Ray of Light", "Bad Girl" and "Take a Bow" as the high-points of the collection, while the inclusion of "Fever" and "Human Nature" was criticized. Jose Promis from AllMovie felt that "[t]he decision to include virtual non-hits such as 'Love Don't Live Here Anymore' over smashes such as 'You'll See' or 'I'll Remember' is bewildering, making this collection a decidedly mixed bag."

== Commercial performance ==
The collection debuted at 3 on Billboard's Top Music Videos. It also debuted at number 36 on Top Video Sales chart on December 4, 1999, and the second week it moved 23 places to 13. The next week it reached a peak of eight on the chart, remaining at the position for three additional weeks. Video Collection reached the peak of eight again on the Billboard issue dated February 5, 2000. It was present on the Music Video chart for a total of 32 weeks. On November 13, 2008, the DVD was certified platinum in the United States by the Recording Industry Association of America (RIAA) for shipment of 100,000 copies. It was also certified platinum in Argentina by the Argentine Chamber of Phonograms and Videograms Producers (CAPIF) for shipment of 8,000 copies, as well as gold in Brazil by the Associação Brasileira dos Produtores de Discos (ABPD) for shipment of 25,000 copies. After seventeen weeks of staying at the top of the Danish Top 10 DVD chart, Video Collection made a re-entry on the chart at the number three, in August 2001. In Denmark, the video collection sold 135 copies as of 2000.

== The Ultimate Collection ==
On September 18, 2000, a box set titled The Ultimate Collection was released, which contained The Video Collection 93:99 and The Immaculate Collection. R.S. Murthy from New Straits Times said that "this boxed set offers Madonna fans and the Madonna initiates a very good collection of her videos, and helps them understand the wonder that Madonna is." Jeremy Jennings from the St. Paul Pioneer Press listed the box set as one of the most promising collection in his list of "Best Fall CDs" for 2000. Robin Givhan from The Washington Post called the collection "A veritable homage to the many faces of Madonna, from her current ghetto cowboy incarnation to her old boy-toy persona, the collection featured duded-up music videos and many pictures—a reminder of Madonna as the queen of re-invention."

== Track listing and formats ==
The Video Collection 93:99 – VHS edition
| No. | Title | Writer(s) | Director(s) | Length |
|---|---|---|---|---|
| 1. | "Bad Girl" | Madonna; Shep Pettibone; Anthony Shimkin | David Fincher | 6:11 |
| 2. | "Fever" | Eddie Cooley; John Davenport | Stéphane Sednaoui | 4:08 |
| 3. | "Rain" | Madonna; Pettibone | Mark Romanek | 4:34 |
| 4. | "Secret" | Madonna; Dallas Austin; Pettibone | Melodie McDaniel | 4:22 |
| 5. | "Take a Bow" | Madonna; Kenneth "Babyface" Edmonds | Michael Haussman | 4:34 |
| 6. | "Bedtime Story" | Nellee Hooper; Björk; Marius De Vries | Romanek | 4:25 |
| 7. | "Human Nature" | Madonna; Dave Hall; Shawn McKenzie; Kevin McKenzie; Michael Deering | Jean-Baptiste Mondino | 4:33 |
| 8. | "Love Don't Live Here Anymore" | Miles Gregory | Mondino | 4:39 |
| 9. | "Frozen" | Madonna; Patrick Leonard | Chris Cunningham | 5:21 |
| 10. | "Ray of Light" | Madonna; William Orbit; Clive Maldoon; Dave Curtiss; Christine Ann Leach | Jonas Åkerlund | 5:06 |
| 11. | "Drowned World/Substitute for Love" | Madonna; Orbit; Rod McKuen; Anita Kerr; David Collins | Walter Stern | 4:57 |
| 12. | "The Power of Good-Bye" | Madonna; Rick Nowels | Matthew Rolston | 4:10 |
| 13. | "Nothing Really Matters" | Madonna; Leonard | Johan Renck | 4:25 |
| 14. | "Beautiful Stranger" | Madonna; Orbit | Brett Ratner | 4:34 |

- The collection was released on VHS, LaserDisc, VCD (Asia only) and DVD. A special limited edition karaoke VCD was also released with the same track list. This VCD showed the lyrics of the song on the video, and the user was able to mute the right audio channel, which contained the full vocal version of the song, or the left audio channel, which contained the instrumental version of the song.

== Charts ==
=== Weekly charts ===
Weekly chart performance for The Video Collection 93:99
| Charts (1999–2006) | Peak position |
|---|---|
| Danish Music DVD (Tracklisten) | 1 |
| Portuguese Music DVD (AFP) | 30 |
| Spanish Music DVD (PROMUSICAE) | 14 |
| UK Music Videos (Official Charts) | 1 |
| US Top Music Videos (Billboard) | 3 |
| US Top Video Sales (Billboard) | 8 |

Weekly chart performance for The Ultimate Collection
| Charts (2000–2008) | Peak position |
|---|---|
| Danish Music DVD (Tracklisten) | 5 |
| Hungarian Music DVD (Mahasz) | 14 |
| Italian Music DVD (FIMI) | 3 |
| Norwegian Top 10 DVD Audio (VG-lista) | 7 |
| Spanish Music DVD (PROMUSICAE) | 5 |
| Swiss Music DVD (Schweizer Hitparade) | 4 |
| UK Music Videos (Official Charts) | 4 |

=== Year-end charts ===
Year-end chart performance for The Video Collection 93:99
| Charts (2000) | Peak position |
|---|---|
| Danish Music DVD (Tracklisten) | 18 |
| US Top Music Videos (Billboard) | 19 |
| US Top Video Sales (Billboard) | 33 |

== Certifications ==
| Region | Certification | Certified units/sales |
|---|---|---|
| Argentina (CAPIF) Listed as "Video Collection 93 – 99" | Platinum | 8,000^{^} |
| Australia (ARIA) The Ultimate Collection | Gold | 7,500^{^} |
| Brazil (Pro-Música Brasil) | Gold | 25,000^{*} |
| United Kingdom (BPI) | 2× Platinum | 100,000^{^} |
| United Kingdom (BPI) The Ultimate Collection | Gold | 25,000^{^} |
| United States (RIAA) | Platinum | 100,000^{^} |
^{*} Sales figures based on certification alone.^{^} Shipments figures based on certification alone.
