= Drowned World Tour 2001 (video) =

Video by Madonna
- Released: November 13, 2001
- Recorded: August 26, 2001
- Venue: The Palace of Auburn Hills (Auburn Hills, Michigan)
- Genre: Pop; electronic
- Length: 105:00
- Label: Warner Music Vision; Warner Reprise Video; Maverick; Warner Bros.
- Director: Hamish Hamilton
- Producer: Madonna; Marty Callner; Randall Gladstein

Madonna video chronology
The Video Collection 93:99 (1999)	Drowned World Tour 2001 (2001)	I'm Going to Tell You a Secret (2006)

Drowned World Tour 2001 is the fifth video album by American singer-songwriter Madonna. It was released on November 13, 2001, by Warner Music Vision, Warner Reprise Video, and Maverick Records to accompany Madonna's second greatest hits album GHV2. The video chronicles a live date from Madonna's Drowned World Tour, which visited Europe and North America, grossing over US$76.8 million ($139.64 million in 2025 dollars) in total. It was recorded at The Palace of Auburn Hills in Auburn Hills, Michigan on August 26, 2001, and was originally broadcast live on HBO as Madonna Live! Drowned World Tour 2001.

Drowned World Tour 2001 was captured with a 14-camera High Definition shoot. It is presented in an aspect ratio of 1.33:1 on the single-sided, double-layered DVD; due to those dimensions, the image was not enhanced for 16:9 televisions. The set list for the show consisted mainly of songs from her studio albums Ray of Light and Music. Among her pre-1990s hits, only "Holiday" and "La Isla Bonita" were added to the set list. Following its release, the video received mixed response from critics, who praised the sound quality but criticized the poor image. Drowned World Tour 2001 became Madonna's fifth number-one release on the Billboard Top Music Videos chart, and achieved platinum certification there, as well as Australia, Brazil, France, and the United Kingdom.

== Background ==
The Drowned World Tour was the fifth concert tour by Madonna. It supported her seventh and eighth studio albums Ray of Light and Music respectively, and visited Europe and North America. It was also her first tour in eight years, following The Girlie Show World Tour in 1993. The tour was supposed to start in 1999, but was delayed until 2001 as Madonna gave birth to her son Rocco, married Guy Ritchie, was working on Music, and was busy filming The Next Best Thing. When the tour was decided, Madonna appointed Jamie King as choreographer and the tour was planned in a short timespan of three months, including signing up the dancers, musicians, and technicians. Designer Jean Paul Gaultier developed the costumes in such way that they indicated different phases of Madonna's career. The tour garnered positive reception from contemporary critics.

Tour dates were limited to cities in Europe and United States and it became the first and only Madonna tour to skip over Canada completely. After the tour was over, industry reports presented that it earned US$76.8 million ($139.64 million in 2025 dollars) in total, from forty-seven summer sold-out shows and eventually played in front of 730,000 people throughout North America and Europe, averaging at $1.6 million ($2.91 million in 2025 dollars) per show. Drowned World Tour became the highest-grossing concert tour of 2001 by a solo artist, as well as the fourth highest-grossing among all, behind U2, NSYNC, and the Backstreet Boys. Drowned World received the Major Tour of the Year and Most Creative Stage Production awards nominations at the 2001 Pollstar Awards, but lost them to U2.

== Development ==
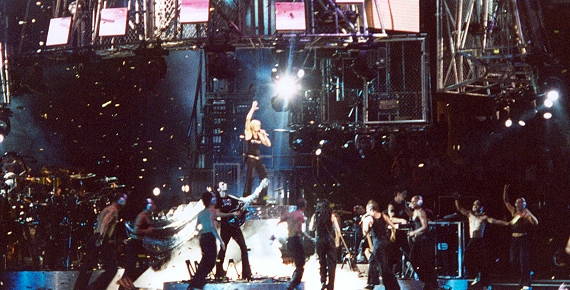
The stage for the Drowned World Tour, with Madonna in the middle

The concert was recorded on August 26, 2001, and broadcast live on HBO from The Palace of Auburn Hills in Auburn Hills, Michigan, watched by a crowd of 17,000. Known as Madonna Live! – Drowned World Tour 2001, the broadcast was announced by Nancy Geller, senior vice president of HBO Original Programming. She commented, "It's a thrill for us to have Madonna back, because we know it is going to be a spectacular show, with that combination of her amazing talent and extravagant style which only Madonna can bring." The broadcast was produced by Marty Callner and directed by Hamish Hamilton. The broadcast was Madonna's first since 1993, when Madonna Live Down Under: The Girlie Show from Sydney, Australia became HBO's most-watched original program of the year.

Three months later, a video titled Drowned World Tour 2001 was released in all regions on November 13, 2001, the same day her second compilation album, GHV2, was released. Drowned World Tour 2001 was captured with a 14-camera High Definition shoot. It is presented in an aspect ratio of 1.33:1 on the single-sided, double-layered DVD; due to those dimensions, the image was not enhanced for 16:9 televisions. Three audio tracks were made available—a DTS track, a Dolby Digital 5.1 track, and a Dolby Digital 2.0 Stereo track. A photo gallery was included as a bonus feature. The photographs used on the DVD packaging were taken by Madonna's friend Rosie O'Donnell. Manhattan group Effanel Music, a mobile and portable multitrack remote recording company and its sub-division, L7 Group, did the recording and post-production works on the DVD.

== Critical reception ==
"Sharpness was the major issue. From the very start of the performance, I felt the image looked very soft. A few close-ups came across as acceptably crisp and distinct, but beyond those, much of the show seemed blurry and ill defined. The softness wasn't consistent, by which I mean that some shots looked fuzzier than others. However, much of the concert was affected by this well definition, and the project as a whole seemed blurry and without very good delineation.

— Colin Jacobson explaining the issues with the DVD's picture quality.

The Drowned World Tour 2001 received mixed response from critics. Darryl Sterdan from Jam! commented that "even though the gig isn't exactly mind-blowing — the Matrix-style wire-work probably looked way cooler in person than it does on TV... the set has enough hits to make it a decent historical document". According to Orlando Sentinel's Ben Wener, Drowned World Tour 2001 was "the same eye-popping show aired this past summer on HBO, only with vastly superior sound and sparkling picture". A reviewer from DVD.net gave the video a rating of six on ten, and the audio a nine on ten. The reviewer praised the DVD saying that "this is a quality release that highlights a performer well and truly on top of her game and for what it's worth, she is probably among the best at what she does."

Colin Jacobson from the DVD Movie Guide website complained about its lack of sharpness and commented, "Frankly, I'm at a loss to understand how such an unattractive video hit the shelves". He also criticized the lack of extra content, but complimented the DVD's sound. Jacobson gave the release's image, sound and extras ratings of D+, A−, D, respectively. Aaron Beriele from DVD Talk website shared Jacobson's views, saying that it was "a wonderful show from Madonna and I can only imagine what it was like to actually be there. As for the DVD, it offers outstanding audio quality, but only so-so image quality. Still, it's a terrific show and the DVD still certainly gets a recommendation."

The HBO broadcast won the Best TV Concert category at the 2002 AOL TV Viewer Awards. It was also nominated for Outstanding Choreography and Outstanding Costumes for a Variety, Nonfiction, or Reality Programming at the 54th Primetime Emmy Awards. In January 2002, it was reported by Billboard that Drowned World Tour 2001 was deemed "too explicit" for Singapore and banned from release there. The Singapore Board of Film Censors, known as Media Development Authority (MDA), took offence with two scenes during the "What It Feels Like for a Girl" interlude, in particular Japanese-inspired animation sequences that depicted a monster fondling and raping an Asian girl. Madonna's management debated whether to release an edited version of the video album in the region.

== Commercial performance ==
In the United States, the release debuted atop the Billboard Top Music Videos chart. It was Madonna's fifth release to reach number one on the chart. The next week it dropped to number two being replaced from the top by Britney Spears' video, Britney: The Videos. Drowned World Tour 2001 was present for a total of 20 weeks on the chart and was certified platinum by the Recording Industry Association of America (RIAA) for shipment of more than 100,000 copies of the release. As of September 2010, it has sold 144,000 copies in United States, according to Nielsen SoundScan.

On December 24, 2001, the video album debuted at number six on the DVD chart in Australia and was present for three weeks. It was certified platinum in the region by the Australian Recording Industry Association (ARIA) for shipment of 15,000 copies. Drowned World Tour 2001 debuted at number three on the Swedish DVD Chart, becoming its peak position, while in Denmark it reached a peak of number five. The DVD was also certified platinum in Brazil and the United Kingdom by the Associação Brasileira dos Produtores de Discos (ABPD) and British Phonographic Industry (BPI) respectively for shipment of 50,000 copies.

== Track listing ==
Taken from the back casing of the Drowned World Tour 2001 US DVD release.

No.	Title	Writer(s)	Length
1.	"Drowned World/Substitute for Love"	Madonna; William Orbit; Rod McKuen; Anita Kerr; David Collins	6:24
2.	"Impressive Instant"	Madonna; Mirwais Ahmadzaï	3:55
3.	"Candy Perfume Girl"	Madonna; Orbit; Susannah Melvoin	4:56
4.	"Beautiful Stranger"	Madonna; Orbit	4:35
5.	"Ray of Light"	Madonna; Orbit; Clive Muldoon; Dave Curtis; Christine Leach	6:10
6.	"Paradise (Not for Me)"	Madonna; Ahmadzaï	4:04
7.	"Frozen" (Open Your Heart swell)	Madonna; Leonard	5:11
8.	"Nobody's Perfect"	Madonna; Ahmadzaï	4:03
9.	"Mer Girl (Part 1)"	Madonna; Orbit	0:10
10.	"Sky Fits Heaven"	Madonna; Leonard	7:04
11.	"Mer Girl (Part 2)"	Madonna; Orbit	3:31
12.	"I Deserve It"	Madonna; Ahmadzaï	4:29
13.	"Don't Tell Me"	Madonna, Ahmadzaï, Joe Henry	4:46
14.	"Human Nature"	Madonna; Dave Hall; Shawn McKenzie; Kevin McKenzie; Milo Deering	3:17
15.	"The Funny Song"	Madonna	4:33
16.	"Secret"	Madonna; Dallas Austin; Shep Pettibone	4:19
17.	"Gone"	Madonna; Damian Le Gassick; Nik Young	3:39
18.	"Don't Cry for Me Argentina" (instrumental)	Andrew Lloyd Webber; Tim Rice	2:25
19.	"Lo Que Siente la Mujer" (Spanish version of "What It Feels Like for a Girl")	Madonna; Guy Sigsworth	5:24
20.	"La Isla Bonita"	Madonna; Patrick Leonard; Bruce Gaitsch	6:41
21.	"Holiday"	Curtis Hudson; Lisa Stevens	5:52
22.	"Music"	Madonna; Ahmadzaï	5:50
Total length:			105:00

== Personnel ==
Credits adapted from Drowned World Tour 2001 DVD liner notes.

- Madonna – main performer
- Hamish Hamilton – director
- Marty Callner – producer
- Randall Gladstein – producer
- Jamie King – stage production direction
- Jean-Paul Gaultier – costumes
- Dean and Dan Caten of DSquared^{2} – costumes
- Dolce & Gabbana – costumes
- Donatella Versace – costumes
- Catherine Malandrino – costumes
- Alex Magno – choreographer
- Dago Gonzalez – video director
- Stuart Price – musical direction, keyboards, bass-guitar
- Marcus Brown – keyboards
- Monte Pittman – guitar
- Ron Powell – percussion
- Steve Sidelnyk – drums
- Christian Vincent – head dancer
- Niki Haris – vocals, backup singer
- Donna De Lory – vocals, backup singer
- Ruthy Inchaustegui – dancers
- Nito Larioza – dancers
- Tamara Levinson – dancers
- Anthony Jay Rodriguez – dancers
- Jamal Story – dancers
- Kemba Shannon – dancers
- Eko Supriyanto – dancers
- Jull Weber – dancers
- Addie Yungmee – dancers
- Kevin Reagan – design, art direction
- Photonica – back cover photograph
- Rosie O'Donnell – cover and inlay photograph
- Cream Cheese Films/Tadpole Films Inc. – production company

== Charts ==
=== Weekly charts ===
Also charted as Live in Detroit in some record charts
Chart (2001–2006)	Peak position
Australian Music DVD (ARIA)	4
Danish Music DVD (Tracklisten)	5
Dutch Music DVD (MegaCharts)	1
Greek Music DVD (IFPI Greece)	7
Hungarian Music DVD (Mahasz)	2
Portuguese Music DVD (AFP)	1
Spanish Music DVD (PROMUSICAE)	5
Swedish Music DVD (Sverigetopplistan)	3
Swiss Music DVD (Schweizer Hitparade)	6
UK Music Videos (OCC)	1
US Top Music Videos (Billboard)	1

=== Monthly charts ===
Chart (2004)	Peak position
Argentine Music DVD (CAPIF)	17

=== Year-end charts ===
Chart (2001)	Position
Australian Music DVD (ARIA)	26

Chart (2002)	Position
Australian Music DVD (ARIA)	22
Swedish Music DVD (Sverigetopplistan)	25

Chart (2006)	Position
Greek Music DVD (IFPI Greece)	47

== Certifications ==
Region	Certification	Certified units/sales
Argentina (CAPIF) Listed as "Live in Detroit"	Platinum	8,000^{^}
Australia (ARIA)	Platinum	15,000^{^}
Austria (IFPI Austria) Listed as "Live in Detroit"	Gold	5,000^{*}
Brazil (Pro-Música Brasil)	Platinum	50,000^{*}
France (SNEP)	2× Platinum	40,000^{*}
Spain (Promusicae)	Gold	10,000^{^}
United Kingdom (BPI)	Platinum	50,000^{^}
United States (RIAA)	Platinum	144,000
^{*} Sales figures based on certification alone.^{^} Shipments figures based on certification alone.
