= GHV2 =

GHV2: Greatest Hits Volume 2

Greatest hits album by Madonna
- Released: November 13, 2001
- Recorded: 1991–2000
- Genre: Pop
- Length: 68:26
- Labels: Maverick; Warner Bros.
- Producers: Madonna; Mirwais Ahmadzaï; Dallas Austin; Babyface; David Caddick; Dave Hall; Nellee Hooper; Patrick Leonard; William Orbit; Alan Parker; Shep Pettibone; Guy Sigsworth; Mark "Spike" Stent; Andrew Lloyd Webber; Nigel Wright

Madonna chronology
Music (2000)	GHV2 (2001)	American Life (2003)

GHV2: Greatest Hits Volume 2 is the second greatest hits album by American singer Madonna. It was released by Maverick and Warner Bros. Records on November 13, 2001, coinciding with the video album, Drowned World Tour 2001. A follow-up to The Immaculate Collection (1990), GHV2 contains a collection of singles during the second decade of Madonna's career. Madonna mentioned that she only included "songs that I could listen to five times in a row" on it. The album did not contain any new songs, but a promotional single titled "GHV2 Megamix" was released, which contained remixes by Thunderpuss, John Rocks & Mac Quayle and Tracy Young. A promotional remix album was also issued, titled GHV2 Remixed: The Best of 1991–2001.

GHV2 received generally positive reviews from music critics, who deemed it an essential compilation, although some criticized the absence of new material. Commercially, the compilation was successful, peaking at number seven on the US Billboard 200 and was certified platinum by the Recording Industry Association of America (RIAA). Elsewhere, GHV2 also attained success, reaching the top five in Australia, Germany, the United Kingdom and several other European countries. It was the 14th best-selling album of the year and has sold more than seven million units worldwide.

== Background and development ==
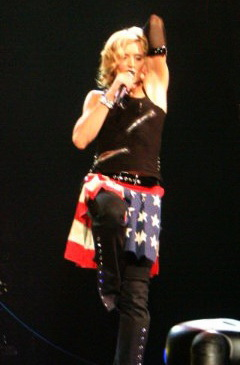
Madonna performing at the Drowned World Tour whose video album was released alongside GHV2

In early September 2001, media reported that Madonna had recorded two songs, "Sex Makes the World Go Round" and "Veronica Electronica", to be included on a forthcoming greatest hits album. The last title was from an unreleased remix album in collaboration with William Orbit. It was also reported that the album would be titled The Immaculate Collection 2. However, both the title and new song rumors were proven false. After the final show of Madonna's Drowned World Tour on September 15, 2001, MTV News confirmed that the singer planned to release a greatest hits album in November 2001. On October 4, 2001, Maverick Records announced the track list of GHV2 as well as its official release date. The album coincided with the release of the DVD/VHS video album of the tour.

A sequel to her first greatest hits album, The Immaculate Collection (1990), GHV2 included fifteen singles released during Madonna's second decade in the recording industry, spanning "Erotica" (1992) to "What It Feels Like for a Girl" (2001). Unlike the former release, GHV2 did not feature any new material. In an interview with BBC's Jo Whiley, Madonna spoke about the selection of the tracks stating, "I like 'Fever', alright. But you know, the thing is they had to have listening power for me. I had to be able to listen to them five times in a row and think this is really good, this is a well written song, it's really well produced." She also added that "If you listen to the record, you can really see my evolution as a singer, songwriter, and, more important, a human being." Madonna felt that because it was a "greatest hits", it should only contain previously released hit songs. Several of her popular singles of that period were excluded from the album. Despite being a worldwide number-one hit in 2000, "American Pie" was not included because Madonna had regretted putting it on her eighth studio album, Music (2000). "It was something a certain record company executive twisted my arm into doing, but it didn't belong on the album so now it's being punished... My gut told me not to [put the song on Music], but I did it and then I regretted it so just for that reason it didn't deserve a place on GHV2," she said. Other notable exclusions were "This Used to Be My Playground", "Rain", "I'll Remember" and "You'll See"—all of which had been included on her ballads compilation Something to Remember (1995).

The album was originally titled Greatest Hits: The Second Coming, but Madonna decided to change the name to GHV2 just before it was released as "it's a title you will remember" and also because of "laziness", due to the fact that she had just finished the Drowned World Tour and was about to begin filming Swept Away (2002). The cover picture is from a 2001 photo shoot for InStyle magazine, by Regan Cameron. It was revealed through Madonna's official website, on October 18, 2001. Cameron recalled that they had been given the assignment of shooting Madonna for InStyle and he was nervous. It was shot at Smashbox Studios in Los Angeles and he tried out first with a polaroid. Two of the pictures from the session were used by Madonna, the first showing her with her finger on her lips as a promotional photo for the HBO debut of her Drowned World Tour video, and another one showing her with hair in front of her right eye for GHV2. Cameron also contributed artwork for the inner sleeve, which features 600 photographs of Madonna through the years. "GHV2" can also be seen on the cover art on Madonna's eye. The sleeve also contains Japanese lettering (モヂジラミミヂ), which is the result of typing the letters 'M-A-D-O-N-N-A' on an English keyboard but with the keys re-mapped to their positions on a Japanese kana keyboard. It is pronounced as "Mo-Ji-Ji-Ra-Mi-Mi-Ji".

== Release and promotion ==
In order to promote the album, Madonna's recording company Warner Bros. spent £1 million (£1.88 million in 2025 pounds) on its promotion, to generate excitement in the album without the support of media interviews or TV performances, as Madonna was in Malta filming Swept Away. A company executive said, "There will be no Top of the Pops appearance or interview on Radio One or in Q magazine this time so we want the unusual name to get people thinking about the association between Madonna and GHV2" and to generate extra media interest to compensate for the artist's unavailability to promote the release at the time. However, in December, Madonna made an appearance at the 2001 Turner Prize award ceremony and mentioned that she "had a new record in stores called GHV2".

Madonna's company Maverick Records sent a promotional megamix titled "GHV2 Megamix" to radio stations on October 29, 2001. However, it was limited to airplay, and was never released commercially nor included on GHV2. The songs featured, in chronological order, were "Don't Tell Me", "Erotica", "Secret", "Frozen", "What It Feels Like for a Girl", "Take a Bow", "Deeper and Deeper", "Music" and "Ray of Light". Remixes were produced by Thunderpuss, Johnny Rocks & Mac Quayle and Tracy Young. Chris Cox from Thunderpuss explained, "Basically, they were doing the greatest-hits album... and so they approached actually a couple of different remix entities to take a stab at doing a megamix, and it was kind of a cattle call, actually. They basically liked ours the best and so they put it out." The remix peaked at number five on the Billboard Hot Dance Club Play chart. An accompanying music video for the remix, directed by Dago Gonzalez of Veneno Inc., was compiled of images of Madonna's live performances and previous music videos and premiered on November 2, 2001, through Total Request Live (TRL) and MTV's website. Chuck Taylor from Billboard complimented the remix, saying that "its quite a trip down post-'80s memory lane from an artist whose continually evolving body of work stands strong—even when summarized in this novel context."

On December 20, 2001, Maverick Records also released a promotional album GHV2 Remixed: The Best of 1991–2001, featuring remixed versions of tracks from GHV2, except "Take a Bow", "Don't Cry for Me Argentina", and "The Power of Good-Bye". Remixes were done by Victor Calderone, Junior Vasquez, BT, Sasha, Timo Maas, and Hex Hector. MTV France listed the remixes on their website for streaming.

== Critical reception ==
Professional ratings
Review scores
Source	Rating
AllMusic	4/5 stars
Blender	4/5 stars
Christgau’s Consumer Guide	B+
Encyclopedia of Popular Music	4/5 stars
The Guardian	4/5 stars
MTV Asia	8/10
NME	8/10
Rolling Stone	3/5 stars
RTÉ	4/5 stars
Slant Magazine	3/5 stars

The compilation received generally positive reviews from music critics. Music journalist Robert Christgau gave a positive review, stating that Madonna "gleans goodies from the overrated Bedtime Stories and Ray of Light, mixes in the glorious soundtrack-only 'Beautiful Stranger' and the dismal soundtrack-only 'Don't Cry for Me Argentina', and hands it all over to Mirwais for sonic tweaking I'm not interested enough to pin down", while calling it "an essential package". A writer from the South Wales Echo gave a positive review, saying that GHV2 is "an essential pop album" and "truly immaculate". MusicOMH's Michael Hubbard complimented the inclusion of "Don't Cry for Me Argentina" from Evita and "Beautiful Stranger" from the Austin Powers sequel The Spy Who Shagged Me, saying that they "are worthy inclusions... compiling this collection didn't require much imagination, the end result does the job—the CD is exactly what it says on the tin."

John Aizlewood from The Guardian gave the compilation four out of five stars, stating: "GHV2 is sufficiently confident to avoid remixes or new tracks. Desperate times, however, call for desperate measures". Ian Wade from Dotmusic positively reviewed the compilation saying, "Had GHV2 been released before 1998, it would've been a not much fun bunch of ballads and arsery. Thankfully, for the sake of herself, her fans and mankind in general, Madge had a bit of re-think. [...] GHV2 contains some of the best pop music made by anybody", although he criticized the omission of some singles like "Nothing Really Matters" and "Rain". Cristine Leach from Raidió Teilifís Éireann gave the compilation 4 out of 5 stars, saying that "[Madonna] is still the queen of pop and GHV2 is essential listening. One for the multiple personality in you this Christmas." Dugald Baird from Music Week noted: "the set is something of an anti-climax, although it is an essential purchase for her army of fans".

Giving the album 8 on 10, Alex Needham from NME criticized the compilation's lack of new tracks, and said "while far from immaculate, this is still quite a collection". About GHV2, New Straits Times' Christie Leo commented that "this second volume of greatest hits isn't as immediately accessible as the first. But that's not what this collection is all about. This 14-track set actually provides a more daring glimpse into the inner machinations of the music marketing juggernaut, Madonna". AllMusic writer Stephen Thomas Erlewine gave a mixed review calling it "slightly disappointing", justifying that it was because during the 1990s, Madonna was an album artist. He finished his review saying that "the end result is less than the sum of its parts, even if this is a good way to get all of Madge's 90s hits at once." Sal Cinquemani from Slant Magazine commented that "GHV2 certainly encapsulates the second decade of the performer's boundary-bridging career", but criticized the lack of new material, and its "choppy edits, random sequences and missing links", saying: "the collection doesn't seem to do justice to a career that has always been ahead of the game and focused on the future". Charlotte Robinson from PopMatters criticized its sequencing, stating, "Chronological sequencing would have made it easier to follow the course of Madonna's musical evolution. But would these changes have made GHV2 a significantly better album? Probably not. As it stands, it's the best summary of Madonna's second decade as a performer we're going to get."

== Commercial performance ==
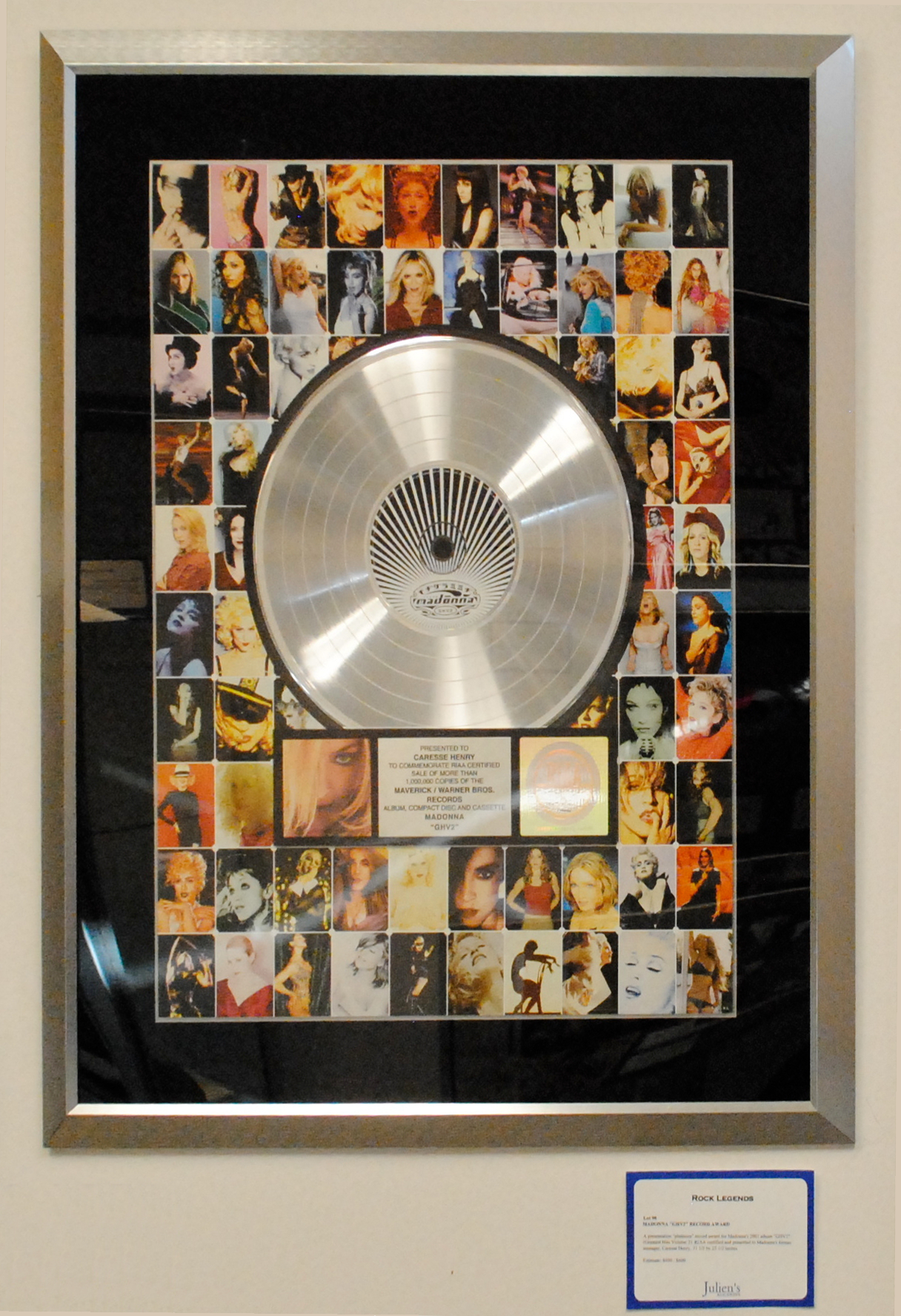
GHV2 platinum record from the RIAA on display at the Julien's Auctions (2011)

In the United States, the compilation entered at number seven on the Billboard 200 chart on the week dated December 1, 2001, with first week sales of 150,000 copies. It was an improvement from the 113,000 copies sold by her 1995 ballad compilation album, Something to Remember. However, GHV2 also became her lowest debut on the chart since The Immaculate Collection (1990), which debuted on the Billboard 200 at number 32. Every Madonna album had debuted in the top six until GHV2. It was present for a total of 18 weeks on the chart and ranked at number 58 on the Billboard 200 year end chart for 2002. As of October 2016, the album has sold 1,397,000 copies in the region according to Nielsen SoundScan, with an additional 90,000 sold at BMG Music Clubs. Nielsen SoundScan does not count albums sold through clubs like the BMG Music Service. It received a platinum certification from the Recording Industry Association of America (RIAA) for shipping over a million copies. In Canada, the album debuted at number 11 on the Canadian Albums Chart, being present in the top 100 for a total of 16 weeks. It was certified platinum by Music Canada (MC) for selling over 100,000 copies.

Even before its release in the United Kingdom, the compilation had broken a record as the album with most shipments before release, with 750,000 copies shipped, overtaking the previous pre-release high of 650,000 copies achieved by Simply Red's compilation album, Greatest Hits (1996). GHV2 debuted at number two on the UK Albums Chart with 88,500 copies, after competing for the top spot with Westlife's third studio album, World of Our Own, with the latter outselling Madonna by two to one in the midweek chart. The album was present for a total of 33 weeks inside the chart, and was certified double platinum by the British Phonographic Industry (BPI). As of June 2019, the compilation has sold 868,500 copies according to the Official Charts Company. GHV2 also debuted at number two, behind Westlife's album in Ireland and Scotland. Across Europe, the compilation reached the top of the chart in Austria, and reaching the top-ten in Belgium (Flanders and Wallonia), France, Germany, Hungary, Italy, Norway, Spain and Switzerland. On the combined European Top 100 Albums, GHV2 peaked at number three.

GHV2 debuted at number three on the Australia ARIA Charts, and was present for a total of 13 weeks within the top 50. The Australian Recording Industry Association (ARIA) certified it double platinum for shipment of 140,000 copies. It had moderate performance in New Zealand where it debuted at number eight on the Recorded Music NZ's album chart, and received a gold certification for shipment of 7,500 copies. The album was successful in Japan, where it received a platinum certification from the Recording Industry Association of Japan (RIAJ) for selling over 200,000 copies. GHV2 was the 14th best-selling album of 2001, selling 4.9 million copies worldwide in that year according to the International Federation of the Phonographic Industry (IFPI). In total GHV2 has sold over seven million copies as of October 2007.

== Track listing ==
=== GHV2 ===
GHV2 track listing
No.	Title	Writer(s)	Original album	Length
1.	"Deeper and Deeper" (7" edit)	Madonna; Shep Pettibone; Anthony Shimkin	Erotica (1992)	4:54
2.	"Erotica" (radio edit)	Madonna; Pettibone	Erotica	4:33
3.	"Human Nature" (radio version)	Madonna; Dave "Jam" Hall; Shawn McKenzie; Kevin McKenzie; Michael Deering	Bedtime Stories (1994)	4:31
4.	"Secret" (edit)	Madonna; Dallas Austin	Bedtime Stories	4:30
5.	"Don't Cry for Me Argentina" (radio edit)	Tim Rice; Andrew Lloyd Webber	Evita (1996)	4:50
6.	"Bedtime Story" (edit)	Nellee Hooper; Björk; Marius DeVries	Bedtime Stories	4:07
7.	"The Power of Good-Bye"	Madonna; Rick Nowels	Ray of Light (1998)	4:11
8.	"Beautiful Stranger" (William Orbit radio edit)	Madonna; William Orbit	Austin Powers: The Spy Who Shagged Me (1999)	3:57
9.	"Frozen" (edit)	Madonna; Patrick Leonard	Ray of Light	5:09
10.	"Take a Bow" (edit)	Babyface; Madonna	Bedtime Stories	4:31
11.	"Ray of Light" (radio edit)	Madonna; Orbit; Clive Muldoon; Dave Curtis; Christine Leach	Ray of Light	4:35
12.	"Don't Tell Me"	Madonna; Mirwais Ahmadzaï; Joe Henry	Music (2000)	4:40
13.	"What It Feels Like for a Girl"	Madonna; Guy Sigsworth	Music	4:44
14.	"Drowned World/Substitute for Love"	Madonna; Orbit; Rod McKuen; Anita Kerr; David Collins	Ray of Light	5:09
15.	"Music"	Madonna; Ahmadzaï	Music	3:45
Total length:				68:06

=== GHV2 Remixed: The Best of 1991–2001 ===
Disc one
No.	Title	Remixer(s)	Length
1.	"What It Feels Like for a Girl" (That Kid Chris Caligula 2001 Mix)	Chris Staropoli	9:51
2.	"Don't Tell Me" (Timo Maas Mix)	Timo Maas	6:56
3.	"Drowned World/Substitute for Love" (BT & Sasha Bucklodge Ashram Mix)	BT; Sasha	9:27
4.	"Human Nature" (Bottom Heavy Dub)	Danny Tenaglia	7:56
5.	"Frozen" (Calderone Extended Club Mix)	Victor Calderone	11:17
6.	"Erotica" (Masters at Work Dub)	Masters at Work	4:50

Disc two
No.	Title	Remixer(s)	Length
1.	"Deeper and Deeper" (David's Klub Mix)	David Morales	7:39
2.	"Ray of Light" (Calderone Club Mix)	Calderone	9:30
3.	"Beautiful Stranger" (Calderone Club Mix)	Calderone	10:12
4.	"Bedtime Story" (Luscious Dub Mix)	Mark Picchiotti; Terri Bristol	7:40
5.	"Secret" (Junior's Sound Factory Dub)	Junior Vasquez	7:58
6.	"Music" (HQ2 Club Mix)	Hex Hector; Max Quayle	8:50
Total length:			102:06

== Personnel ==
Credits adapted from AllMusic.

- Madonna – vocals
- John Mauceri – conductor
- Pat Kraus – mastering
- Bret Healey – design
- Kevin Reagan – art direction, design
- Dan Cadan – liner notes
- Melody McDaniels – photography
- Rankin – photography
- Regan Cameron – photography
- Herb Ritts – photography
- Mark Romanek – photography
- Patrick Demarchelier – photography
- Mario Testino – photography
- David LaChapelle – photography
- Jean Baptiste Mondino – photography
- Peter Lindbergh – photography
- Rosie O'Donnell – photography
- Steven Meisel – photography
- Frank Micelotta – photography
- Gilles Bensimon – photography

== Charts ==
=== Weekly charts ===
Chart (2001–2002)	Peak position
Argentine Albums (CAPIF)	8
Australian Albums (ARIA)	3
Austrian Albums (Ö3 Austria)	1
Belgian Albums (Ultratop Flanders)	3
Belgian Albums (Ultratop Wallonia)	9
Canadian Albums (Nielsen)	11
Czech Albums (ČNS IFPI)	19
Danish Albums (Hitlisten)	19
Dutch Albums (Album Top 100)	13
Europe (European Top 100 Albums)	3
Finnish Albums (Suomen virallinen lista)	11
French Compilations (SNEP)	2
German Albums (Offizielle Top 100)	3
Greek Albums (IFPI Greece)	4
Hungarian Albums (MAHASZ)	8
Irish Albums (IRMA)	2
Italian Albums (FIMI)	7
New Zealand Albums (RMNZ)	8
Norwegian Albums (VG-lista)	5
Polish Albums (ZPAV)	21
Scottish Albums (Official Charts)	2
Singaporean Albums (RIAS)	6
South African Albums (RiSA)	11
Slovak Albums (IFPI)	7
Spanish Albums (PROMUSICAE)	3
Swedish Albums (Sverigetopplistan)	23
Swiss Albums (Schweizer Hitparade)	3
UK Albums (Official Charts)	2
US Billboard 200	7

=== Monthly charts ===
Chart (2001)	Peak position
South Korean Albums (RIAK)	6

=== Year-end charts ===
Chart (2001)	Position
Australian Albums (ARIA)	56
Austrian Albums (Ö3 Austria)	61
Belgian Albums (Ultratop Flanders)	83
Belgian Albums (Ultratop Wallonia)	90
Canadian Albums (Nielsen SoundScan)	91
Danish Albums (Hitlisten)	77
Dutch Albums (Album Top 100)	90
Finnish Foreign Albums (Suomen virallinen lista)	11
French Compilations (SNEP)	5
Hungarian Albums (MAHASZ)	109
Norwegian Christmas Albums (VG-lista)	10
Norwegian Spring Albums (VG-lista)	15
Swiss Albums (Schweizer Hitparade)	74
UK Albums (OCC)	20
Worldwide (IFPI)	12

Chart (2002)	Position
Australian Albums (ARIA)	44
Austrian Albums (Ö3 Austria)	50
Europe (European Top 100 Albums)	62
Finnish Foreign Albums (Suomen virallinen lista)	34
UK Albums (OCC)	101
US Billboard 200	58

=== All-time charts ===
Chart	Position
United Kingdom (2000–2019 Female Albums)	85

== Certifications and sales ==
Region	Certification	Certified units/sales
Argentina (CAPIF)	2× Platinum	80,000^{^}
Australia (ARIA)	2× Platinum	140,000^{^}
Belgium (BRMA)	Platinum	50,000^{*}
Brazil (Pro-Música Brasil)	Platinum	125,000^{*}
Canada (Music Canada)	Platinum	100,000^{^}
Denmark (IFPI Danmark)	Gold	25,000^{^}
Finland (Musiikkituottajat)	Platinum	33,179
France (SNEP)	Platinum	300,000^{*}
Germany (BVMI)	Platinum	300,000^{^}
Japan (RIAJ)	Platinum	200,000^{^}
Mexico (AMPROFON)	Gold	75,000^{^}
Netherlands (NVPI)	Platinum	80,000^{^}
New Zealand (RMNZ)	Gold	7,500^{^}
Poland (ZPAV)	Gold	62,000
South Africa (RISA)	Gold	25,000^{*}
South Korea	—	32,468
Spain (Promusicae)	Platinum	100,000^{^}
Sweden (GLF)	Platinum	80,000^{^}
Switzerland (IFPI Switzerland)	Platinum	40,000^{^}
Taiwan	—	50,000
United Kingdom (BPI)	2× Platinum	868,500
United States (RIAA)	Platinum	1,487,000
Summaries
Europe (IFPI)	2× Platinum	2,000,000^{*}
Worldwide	—	7,000,000
^{*} Sales figures based on certification alone.^{^} Shipments figures based on certification alone.
