= The Immaculate Collection (video) =

Video by Madonna
- Released: November 13, 1990
- Recorded: 1983–90
- Length: 60:00
- Label: Warner Music Vision; Warner Reprise Video; Sire; Warner Bros.
- Director: David Fincher; James Foley; Herb Ritts; Mary Lambert; Jean-Baptiste Mondino; Arthur Pierson

Madonna video chronology
Ciao Italia: Live from Italy (1988)	The Immaculate Collection (1990)	Blond Ambition World Tour Live (1990)

The Immaculate Collection is the second music video compilation by American singer-songwriter Madonna. Released by Warner Music Vision, Warner Reprise Video and Sire Records on November 13, 1990, to accompany the audio release, it contained music videos for the singer's singles released between 1983 and 1990. Although it did not contain all of Madonna's music videos at that point, the collection marks the first time the clip for "Oh Father" (1989) was commercially available worldwide, as it was first limited to the United States.

The Immaculate Collection received positive reviews from music critics, who saw it as a consistent collection of Madonna's videography. In the United States, the release reached number one on the Top Music Videos chart, and was certified triple platinum by the Recording Industry Association of America (RIAA), denoting shipments of over 300,000 copies across the country. It also topped the charts in Canada and the United Kingdom. The Immaculate Collection won the prize for "Best Long Form Video" at the 1991 MTV Video Music Awards.

== Background and release ==
By the end of the 1980s, Madonna had become the biggest female singles artist in history, with the most number-one and top-ten hit songs by a woman in both the United States and the United Kingdom. J. Randy Taraborrelli, author of Madonna: An Intimate Biography, noted that a Madonna's greatest hits album was ready by that point, serving as "a proud landmark" of her career which had progressed upwards since she entered the music scene in 1982. Following the completion of the 1990 Blond Ambition World Tour, Madonna began rushing the project aimed to be released in time for the year's Christmas season, working on new material for the album with Shep Pettibone and Lenny Kravitz. The Immaculate Collection contains fifteen previously released Madonna singles in chronological order, from "Holiday" (1983) to "Vogue" (1990). All of them were reworked using QSound by Pettibone, alongside Goh Hotoda and Michael Hutchinson. Two new songs, "Justify My Love" and "Rescue Me", were included on the album in order to generate public interest, and were later released as singles from the project.

The video album was released on VHS and LaserDisc on November 13, 1990, on the same day as the audio release, containing thirteen music videos, including the live performance of "Vogue" at the 1990 MTV Video Music Awards. A total of fourteen of Madonna's music videos were absent from the collection, notably the film soundtracks; Rikky Rooksby wrote on The Complete Guide to the Music of Madonna that the video was "far from being a complete roll-call of the videos of Madonna's numerous hit singles". He also noted that it marks the first worldwide release of the video to "Oh Father" (1989), which was originally made to support its single release in the United States. A box set titled The Royal Box was issued on December 4, 1990, containing the audio and video versions of the release, a poster, and postcards. The video was released on DVD on June 8, 1999. It was later included in the box sets The Ultimate Collection (2000), which also contained its follow-up The Video Collection 93:99 (1999), and The Madonna Collection (2000), which also included Madonna Live: The Virgin Tour (1985) and The Girlie Show: Live Down Under (1994).

== Reception ==
=== Critical response ===
Professional ratings
Review scores
Source	Rating
Los Angeles Times	3/5 stars
Select	5/5 medals

The Immaculate Collection received positive reviews from music critics. Rooksby stated that "if you don't own any Madonna videos, and you'd like to, this is probably the one to start with." Giving the release a positive review and giving five out of five stars, Russell Brown from Select magazine noted the absence of many of Madonna's videos, and felt that from "Like a Prayer" (1989), "anything subsequent had to be a let-down", but called the video for "Cherish" (1989) a "return to form", and concluded: "So there it is: good sex, bad sex, dominance, submission, money, religion, race, image, reality, sleaze and innocence. Pop culture comes no better and we should be grateful." According to Greg Kot of Chicago Tribune, the video "give[s] a good overview of Madonna's eight-year career."

Writing a review for Music Week, Selina Webb opined that from "Material Girl" (1985) onwards, "a glossy sheen replaces the do-it-yourself styling and Madonna's evolution from alternative pop bimbo to internationally acclaimed artist is brought into sharp focus", also pointing out that her most recent videos in the collection "demonstrate what can be achieved with huge budgets". Giving the release three out of five stars, Los Angeles Times' Chris Willman felt that "the imagery in almost all of the dozen clips collected here has already entered the realm of popular fantasy", but pointed out that "few of these hold up as great videos", highlighting "Open Your Heart" (1986) as the only "close-to-brilliant" video. The Immaculate Collection won "Best Long Form Video" category at the 1991 MTV Video Music Awards, in the ceremony held on September 5, 1991. However, Madonna was not a recipient as she was not the video's producer.

=== Commercial performance ===
In the United States, The Immaculate Collection debuted at number four on Billboard's Top Music Videos for the week dated December 8, 1990, and number 14 on the Top Videos Sales chart. The video compilation later reached number one of the Top Music Videos in January 1991. It also became certified triple platinum by the Recording Industry Association of America (RIAA) on September 20, 1994, denoting shipments of over 300,000 copies across the United States. After Nielsen Soundscan started tracking sales from March 1991, the video has sold 291,000 copies in the region as of 2010. Elsewhere, it topped the charts in the United Kingdom and Canada, becoming the first longform record to enter at number one on the RPM video chart in the latter country. Across Europe, the video compilation moved 300,000 units as of January 1991. Upon its release on DVD in 1999, The Immaculate Collection reached the top 10 in Denmark and the United Kingdom, while peaking within the top 20 in Greece and Portugal.

== Track listing ==
No.	Title	Writer(s)	Director(s)	Length
1.	"Lucky Star"	Madonna	Arthur Pierson	3:30
2.	"Borderline"	Reggie Lucas	Mary Lambert	3:57
3.	"Like a Virgin"	Billy Steinberg; Tom Kelly	Mary Lambert	3:50
4.	"Material Girl"	Peter Brown; Robert Rans	Mary Lambert	4:43
5.	"Papa Don't Preach"	Brian Elliot; Madonna	James Foley	5:06
6.	"Open Your Heart"	Madonna; Gardner Cole; Peter Rafelson	Jean-Baptiste Mondino	4:26
7.	"La Isla Bonita"	Madonna; Patrick Leonard; Bruce Gaitsch	Mary Lambert	4:01
8.	"Like a Prayer"	Madonna; Leonard	Mary Lambert	5:39
9.	"Express Yourself"	Madonna; Bray	David Fincher	5:02
10.	"Cherish"	Madonna; Leonard	Herb Ritts	4:34
11.	"Oh Father"	Madonna; Leonard	David Fincher	4:54
12.	"Vogue"	Madonna; Shep Pettibone	David Fincher	4:54
13.	"Vogue" (live at the 1990 MTV Video Music Awards)	Madonna; Pettibone		6:25

Notes

- "Lucky Star": VHS and Laserdisc editions include the original version of the video, while the DVD format includes the US remix version.
- "Express Yourself": features an edited version of the video, which is based on the 7-inch version instead of the Shep Pettibone video remix.

== Credits and personnel ==
Credits and personnel adapted from the liner notes of The Immaculate Collection.

Producers

- Michele Ferrone ("Borderline")
- Simon Fields ("Like a Virgin")
- Gregg Fienberg ("Express Yourself")
- Glenn Goodwin ("Lucky Star")
- Bruce Logan ("Borderline")
- David Naylor ("Papa Don't Preach", "Open Your Heart" and "La Isla Bonita")
- Vicki Niles ("Oh Father" and "Vogue")
- Sharon Oreck ("Material Girl", "Papa Don't Preach", "Open Your Heart", "La Isla Bonita", "Like a Prayer" and "Cherish")

Photography directors

- Michael Ballhaus ("Papa Don't Preach")
- Jordan Cronenweth ("Oh Father")
- Andrea Dietrich ("Borderline")
- Wayne Isham ("Lucky Star")
- Pascal Lebegue ("Open Your Heart" and "Vogue")
- Bryan Loftus ("La Isla Bonita")
- Mark Plummer ("Express Yourself")
- Steven Poster ("Like a Prayer")
- Herb Ritts ("Cherish")
- Peter Sinclair ("Like a Virgin" and "Material Girl")

== Charts ==
=== Weekly charts ===
Weekly chart peaks of The Immaculate Collection during 1990–1991
Chart (1990–1991)	Peak position
Canadian Long Form Music Videos (RPM)	1
UK Top Videos (Music Week/Gallup)	1
UK Top Music Videos (Music Week/Gallup)	1
US Top Music Videos (Billboard)	1
US Top Video Sales (Billboard)	6

Weekly chart peaks of The Immaculate Collection during 1999–2006
Chart (1999–2006)	Peak position
Australian Music DVD (ARIA)	16
Danish Music DVD (Tracklisten)	3
Greek Music DVD (IFPI Greece)	12
Portuguese Music DVD (AFP)	17
UK Music Videos (Official Charts)	9

=== Monthly charts ===
Monthly chart peaks of The Immaculate Collection
Chart (2004)	Peak position
Argentinian Music DVD (CAPIF)	19

=== Year-end charts ===
Year-end chart positions of The Immaculate Collection
Chart (1990–1991)	Peak position
UK Music Videos (Gallup)	4
US Top Music Videos (Billboard)	2
US Top Video Sales (Billboard)	15

== Certifications and sales ==
Certifications and sales of The Immaculate Collection
Region	Certification	Certified units/sales
Argentina (CAPIF) Video album	2× Platinum	120,000^{^}
Argentina (CAPIF) DVD-5 edition	Platinum	8,000^{^}
Australia (ARIA)	3× Platinum	45,000^{^}
Brazil (Pro-Música Brasil)	Gold	25,000^{*}
Germany (BVMI)	Gold	25,000^{^}
Italy	—	16,000
United Kingdom (BPI)	Platinum	50,000^{^}
United States (RIAA)	3× Platinum	300,000^{^}
Summaries
Europe	—	300,000
^{*} Sales figures based on certification alone.^{^} Shipments figures based on certification alone.
