= Melodie McDaniel =

American photographer and film director

- Born: 1967 (age 58–59); Los Angeles, California, U.S.
- Education: Art Center College of Design
- Occupations: Photographer, film director
- Known for: Music videos, celebrity and advertising photography
- Notable work: Linger (The Cranberries), Secret (Madonna), Carnival (Natalie Merchant)

Melodie McDaniel (born 1967) is a Los Angeles, California–based American still life, celebrity, and advertising photographer and film director.

== Early life and background ==
Born and raised in Los Angeles, California, McDaniel graduated in 1992 from Art Center College of Design, Pasadena, California with a major in Photography and a minor in Fine Art. She studied photography and was inspired to pursue documentary photography after traveling throughout Europe and Israel.

== Career ==
McDaniel's first professional job was album artwork for Suzanne Vega, which received critical praise and led to further work with such musical artists as Smashing Pumpkins, Mazzy Star, Cat Power, Pharrell Williams, and Lily Allen. She went on to direct music videos, including clips for the Cranberries ("Linger", 1993), Annie Lennox, Blonde Redhead, Patti Smith, Tori Amos ("God", 1994) and Madonna ("Secret", 1994). By 1995, she had shot for celebrities like Samuel L. Jackson, Madeline Stowe, Harvey Keitel, Sheryl Crow and David Bowie, for publications like US, Interview, Rolling Stone and The New York Times Magazine. She also directed an adaptation of William S. Burroughs's short story The Junky's Christmas.

She signed with The Directors Bureau in 2002. Melodie has since worked on spots for Chevy, Toyota, Vodafone, Zune, and Nike.

Melodie McDaniel continues to maintain a dual career in commercials/music videos and still photography.

Over the years, McDaniel has shot editorially for Nylon Magazine, Giant Magazine, Elle, Vogue, Spin Magazine, Dazed & Confused, Interview, 10 Magazine, Jane Magazine, Details and Lula Magazine. Apart from brands like Nike, GAP, and Levi's.

She has photographed celebrities including as Lily Allen, Ludacris, Pharrell Williams, Rihanna, Ryan Gosling, Carrie Underwood, Rob Machado, Robin Tunney.

She co-directed the music video, "Carnival" (1995) with Natalie Merchant.
