= Secret (Madonna song) =

1994 single by Madonna

Single by Madonna

from the album Bedtime Stories
- Released: September 26, 1994
- Recorded: April–June 1994
- Studio: Axis (New York City); DARP (Atlanta, Georgia)
- Genre: R&B; pop
- Length: 5:05 (album); 4:25 (edit)
- Label: Maverick; Sire; Warner Bros.
- Songwriters: Madonna; Dallas Austin
- Producers: Madonna; Dallas Austin

Madonna singles chronology
| "I'll Remember" (1994) | "Secret" (1994) | "Take a Bow" (1994) |

Music video
- "Secret" on YouTube

"Secret" is a song by American singer Madonna from her sixth studio album, Bedtime Stories (1994). It was released by Maverick Records on September 26, 1994, as the lead single from the album. She originally recorded the song as a demo with producer Shep Pettibone. However, Dallas Austin replaced Pettibone's role as the producer and reworked its composition, earning him a writing credit alongside Madonna. It was a departure from Madonna's previous musical style, since up to that point in her career, her music had mostly consisted of big-sounding dance tracks and melodic ballads. "Secret" combined the pop and R&B genres with instrumentation from an acoustic guitar, drums and strings, while lyrically talking about a lover having a secret.

The song was released accompanied by eight different remixes by DJ Junior Vasquez, who re-used Madonna's vocals, but changed the composition of the track completely. Unusual for a singer in the mid-1990s, Madonna talked about the new single on the Internet, leaving an audio message for her fans as well as a snippet of the song. "Secret" received favorable reviews from music critics, who praised Madonna's vocal delivery and its mid-tempo R&B groove, deeming it seductive and soulful. In the United States, the single peaked at number three on the Billboard Hot 100 and was certified Gold by the Recording Industry Association of America (RIAA). Internationally, it reached number one in Brazil, Canada, Finland, and Switzerland, and the top five in Australia, France, Italy, New Zealand, Spain, as well as the United Kingdom where it became her 35th consecutive top-ten single.

With the single's cover art and its accompanying music video, Madonna ushered in another image change, inspired by the look of Hollywood actress Jean Harlow. The black and white video was directed by photographer Melodie McDaniel, who was chosen by the singer due to McDaniel's previous short films. It features Madonna as a singer in a nightclub in Harlem, New York City. Interspersed with scenes of daily life in the neighborhood, the video ends with Madonna uniting with her lover and their supposed child. The video sparked academic discussions about what might constitute the lyrical secret of the song. Madonna performed "Secret" on tour for the first time during her 2001 Drowned World Tour. It was later performed at the Houston stop of her Sticky and Sweet Tour in November 2008 as a fan request, and seven years later on some shows of the Rebel Heart Tour.

== Background and release ==
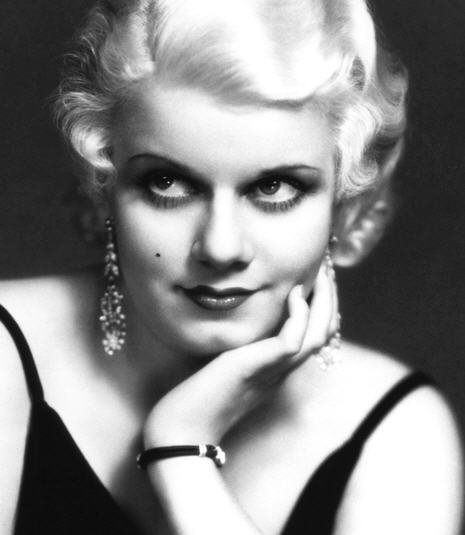
Madonna's appearance on the cover art of the single was compared to that of Jean Harlow.

Following the release Madonna's first book publication, Sex, the erotic thriller, Body of Evidence, her fifth studio album, Erotica, as well as a disastrous interview on David Letterman's show in the early 1990s, the media and public's backlash against Madonna's overtly sexual image was at a peak. Madonna wanted to tone down her explicit image. Her first attempt was to release the tender ballad "I'll Remember" from the soundtrack of the film With Honors. Musically she wanted to move in a new musical direction and started exploring new-jack R&B styles with a generally mainstream, radio-friendly sound. She incorporated it in her sixth studio album, Bedtime Stories, released in October 1994. At first, it started as a collaboration with Shep Pettibone and was to be stylistically similar to Erotica, but due to Madonna's wish to soften her public image at the time, she decided to move towards an R&B sound collaborating with well-known R&B producers and took a more appropriate image for the general public.

After searching, Madonna chose to work with Babyface, whose previous collaborations with artists like Whitney Houston, Boyz II Men, and Toni Braxton had resulted in successful smooth R&B songs. Through him, she met with then upcoming young producer from Atlanta named Dallas Austin, who had become famous for his work on girl group TLC's debut album, Ooooooohhh... On the TLC Tip (1992). Together they composed two songs for the album, "Secret" and "Sanctuary". Madonna said she had the idea for "Secret" before she started working on Bedtime Stories. The song was originally produced in its demo form by Pettibone, under the name "Something's Coming Over Me", however Austin reworked the demo and made it a different song musically. "Secret" premiered on the official Warner Bros. Records' website on September 14, 1994, and was officially released as the lead single from Bedtime Stories 12 days later. The cover art of the single showed a new look for Madonna, with blonde hair and style compared to the look of 1930s American actress, Jean Harlow. Shot by photographer Patrick Demarchelier in black-and-white, the image showed the singer slouched on a sofa with her dress down and revealing her translucent brassiere. Unusual for the mid-1990s, Madonna talked about the new single on the internet leaving an audio message for her fans, as well as a snippet of the song.

Hello, all you Cyberheads! Welcome to the 90's version of intimacy. You can hear me... You can even see me... But you can't touch me... do you recognize my voice?... It's Madonna. Often imitated, but never duplicated. Or, should I say, often irritated? If you feel like it, you can download the sound file of my new single "Secret", from my new album, Bedtime Stories, which comes out next month. I just shot the video in New York, and will be premiering an exclusive sample of it online. So check back soon. In the meantime, why don't you post me a message and let me know what you think of my new song. And by the way, don't believe any of those online imposters pretending to be me... ain't nothing like the real thing. Peace out.

== Recording and composition ==
"Secret"
A 30-second sample of the song, which illustrates the beginning verse and chorus, where the drum beats start, accompanied by the acoustic guitar and the string sections, while Madonna sings in her lower harmonies.

"Secret" was written and produced by Madonna and Austin. It was recorded from April to June 1994 at Axis Studios in New York and DARP Studios in Atlanta, GA. Alongside the production work, Austin also played the drums and the keyboards, while Tommy Martin played the acoustic guitars. Fred Jorio and Mark "Spike" Stent worked on the programming and engineering of the track while Tony Shimkin was the editor. Jon Gass and Alvin Speights mixed the song and finally Jessie Leavey, Craig Armstrong and Suzie Katayama did the strings and conducting sessions.

"Secret" was a departure from the style of music that Madonna had previously released; up to that point in her career her music had mostly consisted of big-sounding dance tracks and melodic ballads. In the track, she mixed pop and R&B together, while also incorporating elements of hip hop and funk. It begins with the sound of an acoustic guitar and wah-wah and just the sound of Madonna's voice singing over it, before opening up to a sparse, retro rhythm section. A descending chord sequence follows and around the one minute mark, the drums start with Madonna singing the chorus "Something's coming over, mmmmmmmm". It is entirely supported by the strings. According to Rikky Rooksby, author of The Complete Guide to the Music of Madonna, the descending chords are supported by the ascending strings—an example of contrary motion used in music. During the middle section, another wah-wah guitar solo is added alongside the strings. Near the end, the melodies add an upper harmony for differentiation with the verses.

According to Musicnotes.com, the song is set in the time signature of common time and progresses in 96 beats per minute. The composition is set in the key of E♭ minor with Madonna's vocal ranging from G♭_{3} to G♭_{4}. "Secret" contains a basic sequence of B♭_{7}–E♭m_{7}–D♭–Cm_{7}–C♭ during the opening verses, and B_{7}–Em–D–C during the chorus its chord progression. Madonna's voice remains at the center of the song's production, as she sings lyrics such as "happiness lies in your own hand". Lyrically it talks about a lover having a secret as well as how Madonna realized that one's happiness is under one's control. Madonna said: "This is a song about spirituality and self-empowerment. It contains an Indian/Hindu philosophy which says that God lives within all of us and that happiness lies in our own hands." In Madonna the Companion: Two Decades of Commentary, authors Allen Metz and Carol Benson write that the tone that Madonna uses when singing these lyrics suggests that she is discussing "self-determinism, not auto-eroticism". Throughout the song Madonna also sings the lyrics "My baby's got a secret," however, she never discloses what the secret may be.

== Remixes ==
Madonna released more than eight remixes of the song in different formats. At the time, "Secret" was experiencing success on the US record charts, to keep the song current in dance clubs, Madonna requested remixes of the song from Junior Vasquez, who was a DJ at the Sound Factory nightclub in New York. According to him Madonna's representatives "sent me a cassette of the song, just to get an idea what the song was... [A]nd when it was 100 beats per minute I said, 'Oh god, what am I gonna do with this?'" Vasquez and his team of engineers first experimented with the track by making remixes closer to the original version. Then he used only Madonna's vocals for the mixed versions, and re-wrote and composed the music as brand new. He was sure of doing house mixes of the track but had to "speed-up" Madonna's vocals. Recording engineer Dennis Mitchell explained, "To do that we have to digitally manipulate her vocals, which is time compression... It just digitally goes in and snipes out tiny little digital slices of the actual sound and squeezes it together so that her tempo is a new tempo but her pitch stays the same." According to Vasquez, Madonna was "on top of everything" including the house mixes as well as the other mixes created.

The song also had dance mixes created by Vasquez. There are two versions of "Junior's Luscious Mix", those being a single edit and a longer version, which has a piano introduction and turns "Secret" into a dancefloor track. According to Billboard these versions have "vibrant keyboards and an elastic bassline". Like the house mixes, here also Madonna's vocals were re-edited to fit in with the faster beats. According to Jose F. Promis of AllMusic, the sped-up vocals made Madonna's voice have a "robotic, detached feel that the original doesn't have." Promis also noted that Vasquez's "Sound Factory Mix" had "swirling instrumentals recalling flashing lights in a nightclub". This remix also incorporated tribal percussion sounds and synth looping. Similarly he noted that the "Some Bizarre Mix" gave the song a "groovier, funkier spin", while the "Allstar Mix", gave it "a cold, hip-hop feel". The song, along with the Drums mix, are featured on the extended play Bedtime Stories: The Untold Chapter. Billboard was positive towards all the remixes, noting that "this single is a promising preamble to what will likely be a cool, new chapter in the career of dance music's most successful graduate."

== Critical reception ==
"Secret" received critical acclaim. In his book Madonna: An Intimate Biography, author J. Randy Taraborrelli described the song as "clever", adding that no matter how many time one listens to it, "it never ceases to intrigue". Chris Wade, author of The Music of Madonna recalled that "Secret" had been his favorite song, and commended the track's production, Madonna's vocals and mixing. He declared it as "one of Madonna's finest cuts from the whole of her 90s output." Wade described the chorus as "sinister and catchy; a strange eeriness about it that only the mystery of the forbidden can conjure." Matthew Rettenmund wrote in his Encyclopedia Madonnica that "Secret" paved way a new direction musically for Madonna; he believed that the track was more haunting musically than Madonna's previous single "Who's That Girl" (1987) and comparable to "Justify My Love" (1990). Rettenmund complimented the cover artwork, saying that "a dozen years into her career, it was one of her most arresting poses shot by Demarchelier, a testament to the durability of her star appeal". Author Lucy O'Brien described the song in her book, Madonna: Like an Icon:

With its chunky backbeat, gentle strings and funky guitar motif, 'Secret' is both languid and tense at the same time. The song has the air of quiet revelation and a relaxation of spirit. Madonna insisted later that the song wasn't just about love but also about spiritual self-empowerment. [Austin's reworked demo] brought out a new warm, soulful tone in her voice, and making her swoony humming sound a central feature of the track.

Stephen Thomas Erlewine of AllMusic listed it as one of the best songs from Bedtime Stories, stating that along with other album tracks—"Take a Bow", "Inside of Me", "Sanctuary" and "Bedtime Story"—it slowly "works its melody into the subconscious as the bass pulses". Billboard also said it is an "instantly memorable and creatively satisfying pop/hip-hop excursion," also adding that the "tune opens with a simple acoustic line, breaking into an easypaced funk beat that snugly fits into current top 40 trends. Madonna's voice continues to grow, and it is put to excellent use over a haunting melody that is fleshed out with subtle, quasi-psychedelic guitar work." Editor Paul Verna described the song as a "pop smash" that is one of the most "seductive" songs from Bedtime Stories. Steve Baltin from Cash Box said, "Featuring her trademark dance backbeat, the song is quieter than usual, creating a serene melody that makes for very easy listening." In his 2011 review of Bedtime Stories, Brett Callwood of the Detroit Metro Times called the song "spectacular". Cathi Unsworth from Melody Maker wrote, "The sheerest of silk stockings, slinky soul for the wee small hours and glasses of red wine." Alan Jones from Music Week gave it four out of five, adding that it "features excellent use of strings and a controlled vocal. Not particularly immediate, but a grower."

Alex Needham of NME called it an "underrated gem", adding that the track has a "brilliant bluesy strut". Charlotte Robinson, writer from PopMatters, wrote that the gentle grooves of "Secret", accompanied by acoustic guitar and delicate strings, make the song "seductive". Barbara O'Dair from Rolling Stone called the song "infectiously funky", adding that her delivery of the lyrics "Happiness lies in your own hand/It took me much too long to understand" shows a downbeat restraint in her vocals that proves the singer is "drawn to sadness". Rooksby concurred that "its a good track" but felt that the time could have been reduced from five minutes, which made it a little long. He also felt that the drums looping around the track made it a "bit monotonous". Sal Cinquemani from Slant Magazine gave the song a rating of A, and noted that "Secret" was probably the most naked performance of Madonna's career, with "acoustic guitars, expertly sweetened vocals and producer Dallas Austin's signature R&B beats [which] soulfully transport the listener into Madonna's troubled yet soothing world."

== Accolades ==
NME magazine ranked "Secret" at number 30 in their list of the best songs of 1994. Similarly, Slant Magazine listed it as the 42nd best single of the 1990s, stating that its "one of the most organic-sounding singles of Madonna's career, taking its sweet time to get where it's going and not giving up too much along the way. The arrangement gets off on being withholding, and, at least for one glorious single, so does Madonna: When she sings, "You knew all along/What I never wanted to say," she sounds positively rapturous. Scott Kearnan of The Boston Globe included the track at number 30 on his list of "Best Madonna Songs", stating "its slinky R&B groove made 'Secret' something special, even if it's not remembered for an accompanying scandal or bawdy 'moment'. We like to talk about her ability to produce controversy and headlines, but at the end of the day, here's what Madonna makes best: pop music".

Louis Virtel of The Backlot listed the song at number 14 on his list of "The 100 Greatest Madonna Songs", calling it "meditative, moving" and "sexy as hell". Jude Rogers from The Guardian called it a "sultry, persuasive R&B number", highlighting Madonna's "deep" vocals. She placed it at number 33 on her ranking of Madonna's singles, in honor of her 60th birthday. Entertainment Weekly's Chuck Arnold listed "Secret" as the singer's 27th best single, writing that "[producer Dallas] Austin brought the hip-hop swagger, but it was [Madonna] who revealed her soul". In August 2018, Billboard picked it as the singer's 35th greatest single, calling it "accessible without giving the whole game away, building its chorus around haunting harmonies borrowed from Nirvana's "Something in the Way" [...] it showed that Madonna could rebound from the bad press of the Erotica era without reverting to playing it safe".

== Commercial performance ==
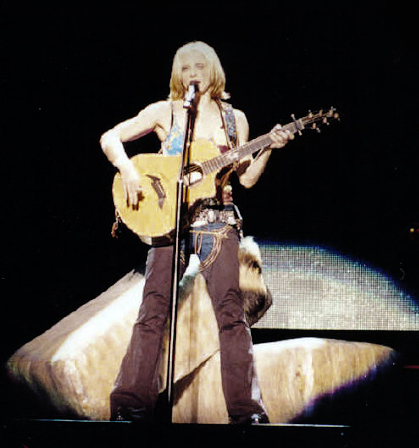
Madonna performing "Secret" during the Drowned World Tour (2001). It was the third highest debut on the Billboard Hot 100 of her career at that time.

In the United States it debuted at number 30 on the Billboard Hot 100 issue dated October 8, 1994 and it sold 18,000 units in its first-week. It was the third highest debut of Madonna's music career at that time, following "Erotica" at number 13 (1992) and "Rescue Me" at number 15 (1991). According to journalist Liz Smith, "Secret" became the most requested song on US radios after it was sent for airplay, being spun on 152 radio stations and gaining around 1,900 spins. Following the release of the commercial CD formats the next week, the song debuted on the Singles Sales chart at number 18 with 18,000 units sold. It also peaked at number three on the US Top 40/Mainstream chart and at number two on the Adult Contemporary chart. On the Dance Club Play chart, it peaked at number one for two weeks, aided by the remixes from Vasquez. At the Year-end Hot 100 ranking for 1994, "Secret" was placed at number 84 and for 1995, it was ranked at number 71. "Secret" was certified gold by the Recording Industry Association of America (RIAA) on January 5, 1995, for shipment of 500,000 copies of the single. In Canada the song debuted at number 91 on the RPM 100 Hit Tracks chart the week of October 3, 1994, eventually peaking at number one for three consecutive weeks starting from November 14, 1994. On the RPM 1994 year-end chart, the song finished at number 23.

In the United Kingdom "Secret" debuted and peaked at number five on the UK Singles Chart, staying on the chart for a total of ten weeks. According to the Official Charts Company, the song has sold a total of 117,957 copies in that region as of 2008. "Secret" became her 35th consecutive top-ten single since "Like a Virgin" (1984), which remains an unequaled record in British chart history. On the French Singles Chart, "Secret" peaked at number two for two weeks, staying on the chart for a total of 30 weeks. It placed at number 26 on the year-end chart and was eventually certified silver by the Syndicat National de l'Édition Phonographique (SNEP) for shipment of 125,000 copies; the song has sold a total of 255,000 copies in France. "Secret" peaked at number one in Finland as well as Switzerland, charting on the Swiss Singles Chart for a total of 19 weeks. The song also placed within the top 10 on the charts in Italy, Spain and Denmark, peaking at number three, number four and number six respectively. In Europe, "Secret" debuted at number 14 on the European Hot 100 Singles and reached a peak of number four in its ninth week on the chart.

"Secret" entered the ARIA Singles Chart at its peak of number five the week of October 23, 1994, eventually charting for a total of fourteen weeks. It later landed at number 46 position on the Australian singles year-end chart. The Australian Recording Industry Association (ARIA) certified it gold for shipment of 35,000 copies. In New Zealand, the song entered the RIANZ Singles Chart at number 31 the week of November 6, 1994, eventually peaked at number five, remaining on the chart for a total of eight weeks.

== Music video ==
=== Conception and development ===
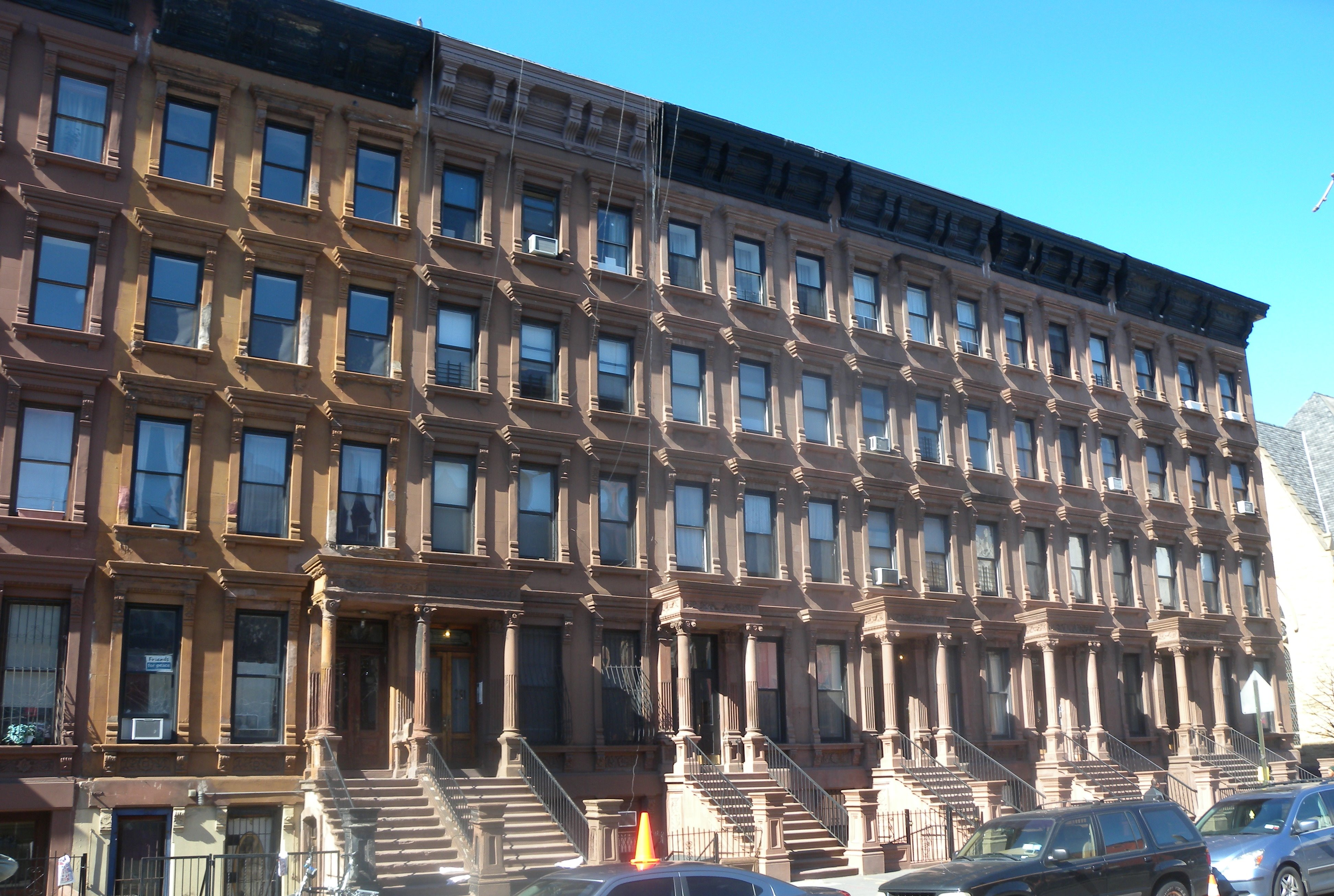
Lenox Avenue, Harlem, New York, location of the video shoot

According to O'Brien, the general critical consensus about Bedtime Stories was "Madonna in retreat. Still smarting from criticism over the Sex book, she [evolved] into a softer, more gentle image. Yet despite the pastel tones of her new look, there was also a sense of grit. She combined this to startling effect with the music video for 'Secret'." Madonna knew that a lot was riding on her first visual after the Erotica era, and wanted to create an effect with it. The video was directed by Melodie McDaniel, who had previously gained acclaim as a photographer for album artwork and also as music video director for bands like The Cranberries and Porno for Pyros. However, Madonna was more interested in one of McDaniel's earlier short films, where she portrayed baptism combining with voodoo rituals. She enlisted McDaniel and explained that she was "drawn to the rawness of [McDaniel's] film". Madonna wanted to tone down her image and according to McDaniel:

She was ready to go there... Madonna had a blonde Jean Harlow look at the time. I wanted to combine that old classic Hollywood mix with the edginess of modern contemporary, but make it feel timeless. I was trying to think of something different, something real... It was awesome I got this break, but I was freaked out. I was jumping from young artists to working with an icon... I think she was drawn to the rawness of my work.

Before meeting with Madonna, McDaniel first listened to the song and found it inspiring. When asked by the singer about her references for the video, McDaniel presented her with pictures from her favorite 1970s photographer, Bill Burke, who took pictures of people considered as freaks or inbred. Another reference was the photography book, East 100 Street by Bruce Davidson, which showed pictures of people in Spanish Harlem. Madonna let the director live in her New York apartment to continue research and asked her to go through her book collections, including those by Helmut Newton and Richard Avedon. Madonna also started working with a stylist from McDaniel's team called Brigitte Echols, for the fashion and wardrobes in the video. Echols had gone to a low-rent mall called Crenshaw Swap Meet and bought a $180 gold necklace with the name "Madonna" in it, inside a jewelry box. Madonna liked it and together they decided on the wardrobe, including skirts and tops, vintage clothes from costume houses, Smylon Nylon La Perla bra, and two designs from Marc Jacobs. Echols described Madonna's approach to style as "collaborative".

=== Filming and synopsis ===
Madonna as the nightclub singer in the video, showing the edgy and glamorous look as envisioned by McDaniel

The video was filmed during September 9–11, 1994 at Casablanca and on location on 308 Lenox Avenue in Harlem. McDaniel and her team scouted out low-rent, speak-easy locations and they did street-casting, assembling off-beat characters, from transvestites to card tricksters and edgy Harlem teenagers. However, when it came to filming there was a problem—McDaniel's approach was to start the camera and let the cast improvise, but Madonna wanted direction. She would sit on the chair and when McDaniel said "Action", she would still sit there saying impatiently, "What am I doing? What am I doing? Hello?" The director was overawed by Madonna's big entourage and had held herself from speaking her mind about the singer's look. She later asked Madonna to appear edgy like Jennifer Jason Leigh's character in the 1990 drama film Last Exit to Brooklyn. Madonna had her hair and makeup re-done and it was the final look for the video.

Echols recalled that the first scenes shot were those of Madonna walking down Lenox Avenue. While filming, the singer noticed a black leather coat with fur trim, worn by Fatima, the assistant director. Madonna asked for the coat from Fatima and ended up wearing it in the video. Echols also noted that Madonna had a close relationship with the cinematographer, and knew from which angle her shots would be the best and which lights to be used. After the misunderstandings regarding looks and the plot direction were cleared, the filming resumed and was finished within three days. The final scenes were with model Richard Elms in a Harlem house, with Madonna climbing steps and reaching him and their supposed child.

It begins with showing the neighborhood of Harlem, with Madonna as a singer in a small jazz club. She simply sits in the club with her band and sings for her small, mostly black and Latino audience. Interspersed throughout the video are scenes of people living in Harlem, doing their daily chores, including a supporting cast of transvestite prostitutes, a pimp, and a black gang member who shows off the scars on his body. During the intermediate verses, Madonna is shown writhing in the lap of an older, maternal woman, who symbolically baptizes her by splashing water on her forehead. Near the video's end, Madonna walks through the neighborhood and climbs a set of stairs to have a reunion with her family, a young Latin man and their supposed son. The video ends with Madonna smiling towards the camera while sitting at the nightclub.

=== Release and reception ===
The video premiered on October 4, 1994 on MTV, where it became a hit, being played numerous times by the channel. The music video was later included on the Madonna compilations, The Video Collection 93:99 (1999) and Celebration: The Video Collection (2009). The video also generated academic discussions regarding the supposed "secret" of the song. According to the book Madonna's Drowned Worlds, author Santiago Fouz-Hernández argues that the young son that is revealed at the end of the video is in actuality Madonna's lover's secret. Throughout the video, scenes of Madonna are interspersed with scenes of drag queens primping, and religious iconography such as rebirth and damnation. In his book From Hegel to Madonna, author Robert Miklitsch states that the music video for "Secret" is a departure from the various themes—repression and loss, anger and aggression—explored so vividly on Bedtime Stories. Miklitsch goes on to say that, although the video depicts images of cleansing rebirth, the fact that Madonna announced that she was pregnant in 1996 shows that, in retrospect, "Secret" may have been less about cleansing rebirth, and instead more about maternity as birth.

Matthew Rettenmund, the author of "Encyclopedia Madonnica", found contrast in Madonna's white blonde character—with hyper-glamor, heavy mascara, pierced nose and navel, a clingy blouse and vintage high heels—to the neighborhood of Harlem, where Madonna is portrayed as a "Billie Holiday-esque singer in the jazz club". At the end of the video, Madonna climbs up the stairs to her lover's room, Rettenmund found references to the music videos for the singles "Like a Virgin" (1984) and "Papa Don't Preach" (1986), both of which had the singer climbing the stairs but never reaching the destination, unlike "Secret". Rettenmund also observed that "Secret" could serve as a follow-up to the music video for "Borderline" with the events happening ten years and Madonna all grownup. He concluded by saying that in lieu of the singer's 1994 interview with The Face magazine, where she expressed her desire to have a family, the video emphasized on Madonna's interest in a partner and a child.

== Live performances ==
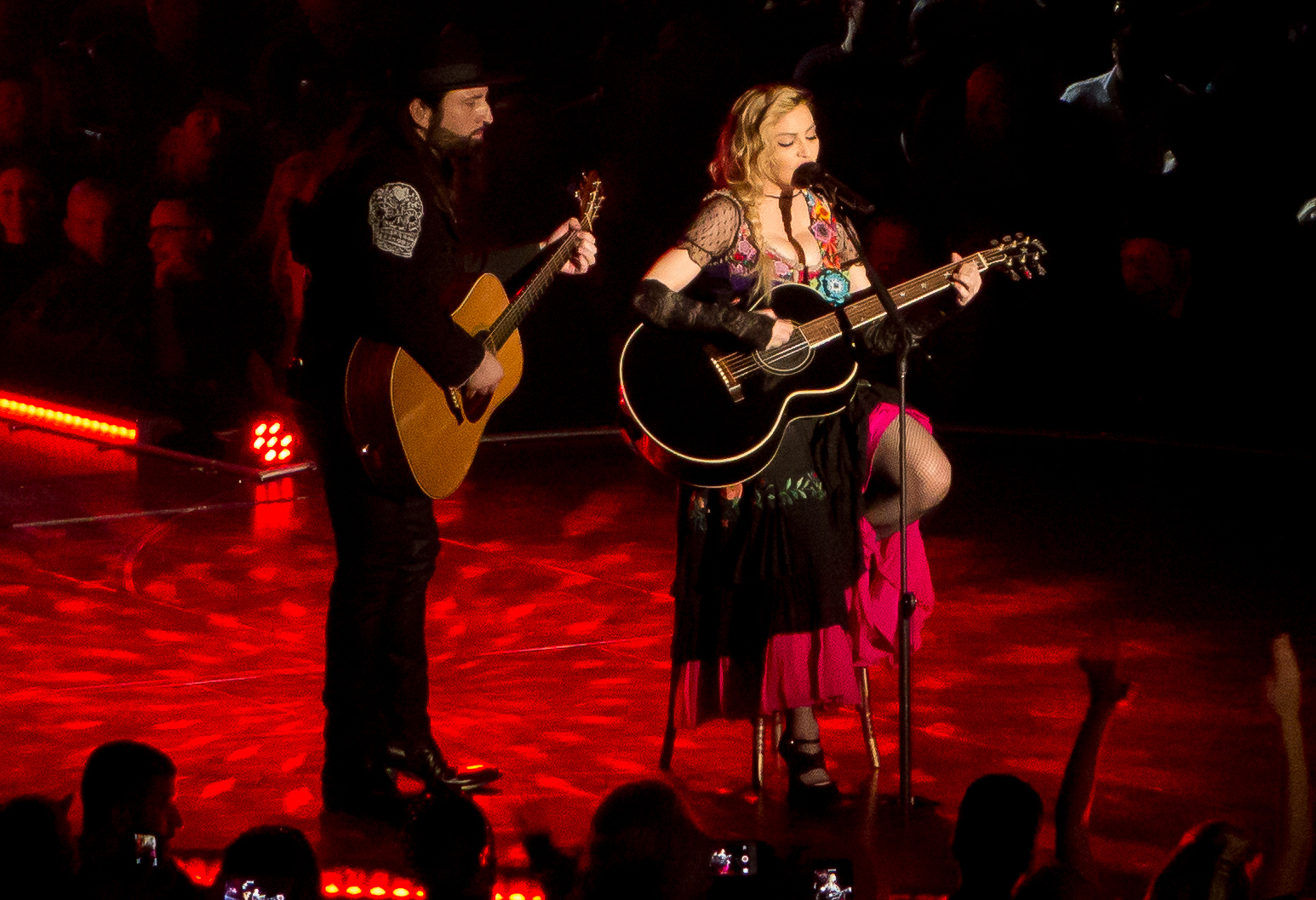
On certain shows of her Rebel Heart Tour (2015−16), such as Las Vegas, Madonna performed an impromptu acoustic "Secret".

On February 18, 1995, Madonna arrived in Europe to promote Bedtime Stories; that same day, she appeared on German TV show Wetten, dass..?, where she was interviewed and performed "Secret" and "Take a Bow". "Secret" was performed on Madonna's 2001 Drowned World Tour, during the cowgirl section of the show. The performance was accompanied by a video montage of riverside baptism, whirling dervishes ceremonies and Buddhist prayers; the footage was taken from McDaniel's film which had inspired Madonna for the performance as well as enlisting her. Alexis Petridis of The Guardian called the performance "a gorgeous acoustic reading." Writing for The Victoria Advocate, Steve Dollar praised the performance, saying that the song "has grown in depth" over time. During the New York City performance of "Secret", she dedicated the song to its inhabitants. The performance of the song on August 26, 2001, at The Palace of Auburn Hills was recorded and released in the live video album, Drowned World Tour 2001.

In November 2008, "Secret" was performed a cappella at the Houston stop of her Sticky & Sweet Tour as fan request. After the performance, Madonna said: "Alright Texas! That was really good. I'd forgotten that song". Madonna then did an impromptu acoustic rendition of "Secret" on certain shows of her Rebel Heart Tour (2015−16), such as Vancouver, Los Angeles, Las Vegas, Amsterdam and Atlanta. On Vancouver, she dedicated the performance to a "special guest" in the audience, which was assumed by media to be her ex-husband Sean Penn. The singer admitted she had not practiced the performance which, according to Shawn Conner from the Vancouver Sun, "came across as charitably, unpracticed (if well-intentioned)".

== Formats and track listings ==
- US 7-inch vinyl, 2-track CD single and cassette; Australian and Canadian cassette; Japanese 3-inch CD single
1. "Secret" (Album Version) – 5:05
2. "Secret" (Instrumental) – 5:05
- UK 7-inch picture disc and cassette; European 7-inch vinyl; French cassette
1. "Secret" (Album Version) – 5:05
2. "Let Down Your Guard" (Rough Mix Edit) – 4:36
- Australian, European, French and UK CD maxi-single
1. "Secret" (Edit) – 4:31
2. "Let Down Your Guard" (Rough Mix Edit) – 4:36
3. "Secret" (Instrumental) – 5:05
4. "Secret" (Album Version) – 5:05
- European 12-inch vinyl
1. "Secret" (Album Version) – 5:05
2. "Secret" (Instrumental) – 5:05
3. "Let Down Your Guard" (Rough Mix Edit) – 4:36
4. "Secret" (Edit) – 4:31
- Australian, Canadian and US CD maxi-single; Digital single (2020)
1. "Secret" (Edit) – 4:31
2. "Secret" (Junior's Luscious Single Mix) – 4:17
3. "Secret" (Junior's Luscious Club Mix) – 6:19
4. "Secret" (Junior's Sound Factory Mix) – 10:17
5. "Secret" (Some Bizarre Mix) – 9:48
6. "Secret" (Allstar Mix) – 5:11
- US 12-inch vinyl
1. "Secret" (Junior's Sound Factory Mix) – 10:17
2. "Secret" (Junior's Sound Factory Dub) – 7:57
3. "Secret" (Junior's Luscious Club Mix) – 6:19
4. "Secret" (Junior's Luscious Dub) – 6:20
5. "Secret" (Allstar Mix) – 5:11
- European and UK CD maxi-single "The Remixes"
1. "Secret" (Junior's Luscious Single Mix) – 4:17
2. "Secret" (Junior's Extended Luscious Club Mix) – 7:57
3. "Secret" (Junior's Luscious Dub) – 6:20
4. "Secret" (Junior's Sound Factory Mix) – 10:17
5. "Secret" (Junior's Sound Factory Dub) – 7:57
- European 12-inch vinyl "The Remixes"
1. "Secret" (Junior's Extended Luscious Club Mix) – 7:57
2. "Secret" (Junior's Luscious Club Mix) – 6:19
3. "Secret" (Junior's Sound Factory Mix) – 10:17
4. "Secret" (Junior's Luscious Dub) – 6:20
5. "Secret" (Junior's Sound Factory Dub) – 7:57
- Japanese CD maxi-single "The Remixes"
1. "Secret" (Junior's Luscious Single Mix) – 4:17
2. "Secret" (Junior's Extended Luscious Club Mix) – 7:57
3. "Secret" (Junior's Luscious Dub) – 6:20
4. "Secret" (Junior's Sound Factory Mix) – 10:17
5. "Secret" (Junior's Sound Factory Dub) – 7:57
6. "Secret" (Some Bizarre Mix) – 9:48
7. "Secret" (Allstar Mix) – 5:11
8. "Secret" (Edit) – 4:31

== Credits and personnel ==
Credits and personnel are adapted from the Bedtime Stories album liner notes.

- Madonna – vocals, songwriter, producer
- Dallas Austin – songwriter, producer, drums, keyboard
- Fred Jorio – programming, engineer
- Mark "Spike" Stent – engineer
- Tony Shimkin – editor
- Jon Gass – mixing
- Alvin Speights – mixing
- Tommy Martin – acoustic guitar
- Jessie Leavey – strings, conductor
- Craig Armstrong – conductor
- Suzie Katayama – conductor
- Fabien Baron – art director
- Patrick Demarchelier – cover art photographer

== Charts ==
=== Weekly charts ===
Weekly chart performance for "Secret"
| Chart (1994–1995) | Peak position |
|---|---|
| Australia (ARIA) | 5 |
| Austria (Ö3 Austria Top 40) | 11 |
| Belgium (Ultratop 50 Flanders) | 15 |
| Brazil (Nopem/ABPD) | 1 |
| Canada Retail Singles (The Record) | 1 |
| Canada Contemporary Hit Radio (The Record) | 1 |
| Canada Top Singles (RPM) | 1 |
| Canada Adult Contemporary (RPM) | 1 |
| Canada Dance/Urban (RPM) | 3 |
| Denmark (Tracklisten) | 6 |
| Europe (Eurochart Hot 100) | 4 |
| Europe (European AC Radio) | 1 |
| Europe (European Dance Radio) | 3 |
| Europe (European Hit Radio) | 1 |
| Finland (Suomen virallinen lista) | 1 |
| France (SNEP) | 2 |
| Germany (GfK) | 29 |
| Iceland (Íslenski Listinn Topp 40) | 7 |
| Ireland (IRMA) | 16 |
| Israel (Israeli Singles Chart) | 4 |
| Italy (Musica e dischi) | 3 |
| Japan (Oricon Singles Chart) | 98 |
| Mexico (Notitas Musicales) | 1 |
| Netherlands (Dutch Top 40) | 15 |
| Netherlands (Single Top 100) | 20 |
| New Zealand (Recorded Music NZ) | 5 |
| Scottish Singles Sales (Official Charts) | 7 |
| Spain (PROMUSICAE) | 4 |
| Sweden (Sverigetopplistan) | 12 |
| Switzerland (Schweizer Hitparade) | 1 |
| UK Singles (Official Charts) | 5 |
| UK Dance (Official Charts) | 37 |
| UK Airplay (Music Week) | 1 |
| UK Club Chart (Music Week) | 78 |
| US Billboard Hot 100 | 3 |
| US Adult Contemporary (Billboard) | 2 |
| US Dance Club Songs (Billboard) | 1 |
| US Dance Singles Sales (Billboard) | 1 |
| US Pop Airplay (Billboard) | 3 |
| US Rhythmic Airplay (Billboard) | 9 |
| US Cash Box Top 100 | 2 |

=== Year-end charts ===
1994 year-end chart performance for "Secret"
| Chart (1994) | Position |
|---|---|
| Australia (ARIA) | 46 |
| Canada Top Singles (RPM) | 23 |
| Canada Adult Contemporary (RPM) | 24 |
| Europe (European Hot 100 Singles) | 47 |
| Europe (European Hit Radio) | 34 |
| France (SNEP) | 26 |
| Iceland (Íslenski Listinn Topp 40) | 92 |
| Israel (Israeli Singles Chart) | 11 |
| Sweden (Topplistan) | 74 |
| UK Singles (OCC) | 83 |
| US Billboard Hot 100 | 84 |
| US Cash Box Top 100 | 45 |

1995 year-end chart performance for "Secret"
| Chart (1995) | Position |
|---|---|
| Europe (European Hot 100 Singles) | 87 |
| France (SNEP) | 56 |
| US Billboard Hot 100 | 71 |
| US Maxi-Singles Sales (Billboard) | 37 |
| US Cash Box Top 100 | 49 |

=== Decade-end charts ===
Decade-end chart performance for "Secret"
| Chart (1990–1999) | Position |
|---|---|
| Canada (Nielsen SoundScan) | 12 |

== Certifications and sales ==
Certifications and sales for "Secret"
| Region | Certification | Certified units/sales |
|---|---|---|
| Australia (ARIA) | Gold | 35,000^{^} |
| France (SNEP) | Silver | 125,000^{*} |
| United Kingdom | — | 117,957 |
| United States (RIAA) | Gold | 500,000^{^} |
^{*} Sales figures based on certification alone.^{^} Shipments figures based on certification alone.

== See also ==
- List of number-one singles of 1994 (Canada)
- List of number-one singles of 1994 (Finland)
- List of number-one singles of 1994 (Switzerland)
- List of number-one dance singles of 1994 (U.S.)

== Bibliography ==
- Bronson, Fred (2003). The Billboard Book of Number 1 Hits. Billboard books. ISBN 0823076776.
- Feldman, Christopher (2000). Billboard Book of Number 2 Singles. Watson-Guptill. ISBN 0-8230-7695-4.
- Fouz-Hernández, Santiago; Jerman-Ivens, Freya (2004). Madonna's Drowned Worlds. Ashgate Publishing. ISBN 0-7546-3372-1.
- Metz, Allan; Benson, Carol (1999). The Madonna Companion: Two Decades of Commentary. Music Sales Group. ISBN 0-8256-7194-9.
- Miklitsch, Robert (1998). From Hegel to Madonna: Towards a General Economy of 'Commodity Fetishism'. State University of New York Press. ISBN 978-0791435403.
- Nyman, Jake (2005). Suomi soi 4: Suuri suomalainen listakirja [Finland list of Songs and chartings] (in Finnish). Helsinki: Tammi. ISBN 951-31-2503-3.
- O'Brien, Lucy (2008). Madonna: Like an Icon. Bantam Press. ISBN 978-0-552-15361-4.
- Rettenmund, Matthew (2016). Encyclopedia Madonnica 20. Boyculture Publications. ISBN 978-0-692-51557-0.
- Roberts, David (2004). British Hit Singles & Albums (17th ed.). Guinness World Records. ISBN 0-85112-199-3.
- Rooksby, Rikky (2004). The Complete Guide to the Music of Madonna. Omnibus Press. ISBN 0-7119-9883-3.
- Ryan, Gavin (2011). Australia's Music Charts 1988–2010 (doc). Mt. Martha, VIC, Australia: Moonlight Publishing.
- Salaverri, Fernando (2005). Sólo éxitos: año a año, 1959–2002. Spain: Fundación Autor-SGAE. ISBN 84-8048-639-2.
- Sullivan, Steve (2013). Encyclopedia of Great Popular Song Recordings, Volume 2. Scarecrow Press. ISBN 9780810882966.
- Taraborrelli, Randy J. (2008). Madonna: An Intimate Biography. Simon & Schuster. ISBN 978-1416583462.
- Wade, Chris (2016). The Music of Madonna. Wisdom Twins Books. ISBN 978-1-326-53580-3.
