= Impressive Instant =

2001 song by Madonna

Promotional single by Madonna

from the album Music
- Released: September 18, 2001
- Studio: Sarm West Studios (Notting Hill, London)
- Genre: Acid techno; trance; electropop; electro house
- Length: 3:37
- Label: Maverick; Warner Bros.
- Songwriters: Madonna; Mirwais Ahmadzaï
- Producers: Madonna; Mirwais Ahmadzaï

"Impressive Instant" is a song by American singer-songwriter Madonna from her eighth studio album, Music (2000). Although it was originally intended to be the fourth single of the album, a release was cancelled due to a disagreement between Madonna and her recording company. Finally Warner Bros. released it in the United States as a promotional single on September 18, 2001. Written and produced by Madonna and Mirwais Ahmadzaï, the track is bright and uplifting in its content and composition. It was the first song that Madonna and Ahmadzaï worked on and recorded. Ahmadzaï had to work separately on his laptop to generate the sound elements which Madonna wanted in the song, since it was difficult to generate the music in the recording studio. "Impressive Instant" has been described as a club-savvy acid techno, pop-trance, electropop and electro house stomper containing futuristic keyboard lines, with Madonna's vocals being distorted and robotic. Backed by laser noises and synths, the song's lyrics deal with love at first sight, and contains somewhat absurd, nonsensical lyrics.

"Impressive Instant" was met with positive critical reception. Many reviewers called it a highlight of the album and praised Ahmadzaï's production of the track. Released only in the US, it was a popular dance hit, reaching the top of the Billboard Hot Dance Music/Club Play chart, and staying atop for two consecutive weeks. The track became Madonna's 27th number-one song on this chart, the most for any artist. It was her 36th top-ten song on the Hot Dance Music/Club Play tally and her seventh consecutive chart topper. During the promotional tours for Music, Madonna performed the song in a neo-Western setting at New York and London. It was further performed at the 2001 Drowned World Tour as part of the punk section, with Madonna accompanied by dancers wearing gas masks. The performance was generally received as a highlight of the concert.

== Background and release ==
By 2000, Madonna was dating director Guy Ritchie, and was pregnant with their child. Wanting to distract herself from the media frenzy surrounding this news, she concentrated on the development of her eighth studio album, Music. Thrilled by the commercial success of her 1998 Ray of Light album, she was keen on getting back to the studio to record new material. She was then introduced to French DJ and producer Mirwais Ahmadzaï by her manager Guy Oseary. Madonna instantly liked his pitch-shifting, pulverizing rhythms and his utilization of acid bass in his songs. One of their collaborations was "Impressive Instant" which was described by Madonna as "downright silly". She explained that they "were working on that song and I thought, 'Oh, fuck it, let's just have fun', Life would be such a drag if we were deep and probing all the time."

The song was intended to be released as the fourth single off Music but Warner Bros., Madonna's recording company, wanted "Amazing" to be the next single. The singer felt that "Amazing" was similar to her previous single "Beautiful Stranger" (1999), and wanted the futuristic "Impressive Instant". In an interview with Russian channel Radio Monte Carlo 102.1 FM, remixer Peter Rauhofer explained that Warner Bros. did plan to move forward with the release of "Amazing" without Madonna's help since she was busy preparing for the Drowned World Tour. They planned to promote the single with a music video created from the live performance of "Amazing" on the tour, so Madonna removed the song from the set list.

== Recording and mixing ==
The recording sessions for Music began in January 2000 at Sarm West Studios, Notting Hill, London. The first song that Madonna and Ahmadzaï worked on was "Impressive Instant", since it was almost complete on the demo that he had sent to the singer. Feeling that Madonna's ideas for the track and the composition would be difficult to create in Sarm West, Ahmadzaï wanted to return to Paris and work there on his own computer. "There are a lot of chopped vocal tracks on 'Impressive Instant'... That was impossible to do in the studio. It doesn't make sense to rent a place like Sarm just to have me work on ten seconds of music all day, using only the one computer," he added. Within the first ten days, they had recorded the backing vocals and acoustic guitars on a Sony 48-track and transferred it to a Logic Audio workstation, using the converters of TC Electronic Finalizer.

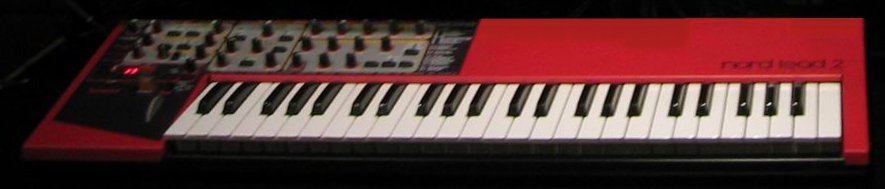
A Nord Lead synthesizer was used to create LFO sweeps at the beginning of the track, thus creating the backdrop ...

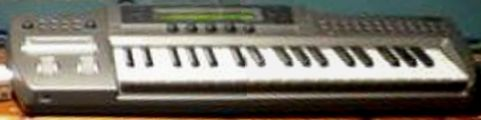
... while a Korg Prophecy analog output added a different synth to the song.

In Paris, Ahmadzaï worked obsessively to complete the recording of "Impressive Instant", applying his characteristic sound mangling. He used the Antares Auto-Tune plug-in set for the pitch correction. The audio processor kept the characteristic of Madonna's vocals, and she sang a little out of tune and vibrato. A Nord Lead synthesizer created the LFO sweeps at the beginning, panning from its left and right, which created the backdrop of the track. The bass was subdued and did not contain any music in high or mid-range. Instead of using a Minimoog synthesizer, Ahmadzaï used a Korg Prophecy analog-modelling synthesizer which added a different texture to the song. Madonna's voice was processed through an Eventide 3000 harmonizer, finally adding effects from audio filters and E6400 emulator. Also, Ahmadzaï added his characteristic stuttering sounds to the song, explaining:

I did all that stuttering in Logic. It's very, very complicated, slice by slice. You have to experiment a lot to make it work. I put Auto-Tune on individual syllables. Sometimes I use 40 tracks of audio just on one vocal track. Each has a different level and treatment, and then I do a composite. I couldn't do this with a normal analog studio setup. The starting and stopping thing, it's an idea I've had for awhile [sic].

The final task was to create a breakdown using Auto-Tune and the Nord Lead synthesizer, applying its echo function. In total Ahmadzaï worked for 15 days on the track, finally handing it to mixing engineer Mark "Spike" Stent. With Keyboard magazine Ahmadzaï explained that the recorded version was almost the same to the final mixed track present for Music. For "Impressive Instant", Stent and Ahmadzaï tried to mix it first from the Sony digital tracks but failed to get the original sound of the demo due to the compression that was present. So Stent included the music from Ahmadzaï's Yamaha 02R mixer, including the bass, loops, and the kick. Along with mixing the track at Olympic Studios, London, the mastering was done by Tim Young at Metropolis Studio. Other engineers working on the track included Mark Endert, Sean Spuehler, Tom Hannen and Tim Lambert.

== Music and lyrics ==
'Impressive Instant' (2001)
A 22 second sample of "Impressive Instant", starting from the middle breakdown, followed by the "burbling" synth, and near the end of the sample, the Korg Prophecy analog output by Ahmadzaï can be heard.

Larry Flick from Billboard described "Impressive Instant" as a "club-savvy stomper" containing futuristic keyboard lines, with Madonna's vocals changing from "distorted, robotic lines" to "playful, child like chants". The song is a mixture of acid techno, pop-trance, electropop and electro house. According to the sheet music published at Musicnotes.com, "Impressive Instant" is set in the time signature of common time with a moderately fast tempo of 123 beats per minute. It is composed in the key of C major with Madonna's vocals ranging from A_{3} to A_{4}. The song follows a basic sequence of Am–G–Am–G–Am as its chord progression.

Rikky Rooksby, author of The Complete Guide to the Music of Madonna, explained that "Impressive Instant" began with the equalizer turned down, so that the amount of treble is very less initially. Madonna's vocals are heavily processed and is accompanied by a crackling sound, which has a "tactile roughness" therefore making the mix sound "like a musical sandpaper", Rooksby wrote. The vocals are often isolated and are backed by laser noises and an octave bass. A "burbling" synth arrives at the 2:30 mark, and then the chorus of "I'm in a trance" is repeated, ending the song with a solo vocal phrase.

The song has lyrics like "I like to singy, singy, singy, Like a bird on a wingy, wingy, wingy", as electronic keyboard riffs and dance beats swirl the whole composition. Lyrically, "Impressive Instant" deals with love at first sight ("You're the one that I've been waiting for / I don't even know your name") and according to O'Brien, is "an abstract world of nonsense lyrics, disco balls and glitz". It also talks about being in a trance and comparison with various cosmic phenomena in lines like "Cosmic systems in a twine, astral bodies drip like wine", but ultimately returns to the subject of dance. DJ Peter Rauhofer was commissioned to remix the track by Warner Bros. Records in April 2001; he transformed the song from techno to progressive house.

== Critical reception ==
"Cher's 'Believe' and Christina Aguilera's 'Genie in a Bottle' both used some of the same electronic fillips as Madonna does on Music. But Mirwais and Madonna push the cybervocals further. In 'Impressive Instant', a bouncy electro outer-space travelogue, Madonna is filtered, repitched, compressed, echoed and edited into sudden leaps; she slips in and out of the hallucinatory electronics with whimsical ease.

— Jon Pareles from The New York Times on the song.

Stephen Thomas Erlewine from AllMusic listed "Impressive Instant" as a top track from the album. In a review of the album, Slant Magazine's Sal Cinquemani hailed it as "a joyous composition". Michael Hubbard of musicOMH called the song "pure pop genius," saying the track "steals the show". Gary Crossing from Dotmusic described the track as a "Sexy, bass-heavy monster of a floor-filler with cheesy synths, robotic voices and whispers aplenty" while complimenting the line "I like to singy singy singy". This view was shared by Victoria Segal from NME who complimented Ahmadzaï's production technique and blending disco sounds with vocoder effects. Barry Walters from Rolling Stone called the song "improvisional", and described it as "[roaring] like a rock rocket ship, then [purring] while a digitally tweaked [Madonna] squeaks". David Browne from Entertainment Weekly felt that the verses of "Impressive Instant" has Madonna's "dippiest lyrics in ages", and also complimented Ahmadzaï's fusion of hard disco beats and contorting vocals. Greg Kot from Chicago Tribune credited Madonna for paying homage to dance music with "Impressive Instant" and explaining that:

Though Madonna is often overshadowed by her producers, she has her moments, and she is never more inspired than on the so-silly-it's-great 'Impressive Instant', yet another homage to the music that leaves her and legions of followers 'spinning, baby, out of control'. She deserves credit for allowing her latest interpretation of that music to be bent, folded and so lovingly mutilated by her collaborators, and when she chirps, 'I like to singy singy singy/Like a bird on a wingy wingy wingy', I can envision discos from Stockholm to Sacramento going bonkers with her.

Gary Mullholland from The Guardian felt that Madonna's indomitable persona was mostly hidden beneath the layers of electronic and vocoder effects, except in songs like "Impressive Instant" with the lines like "'I like to singy singy singy', making the first half of Music interesting. BBC's John Hand noticed Ahmadzaï's "quirky" influence in the production of the track; he also called it a club and dancey song. Michael Paoletta from Billboard found "Impressive Instant" as "vibrant and uplifting in tone". Alex Pappademas from Spin noted the difference of Madonna's endeavors with Ray of Light and its introspective mood and the fun-filled, joyous nature of songs like "Impressive Instant" in Music. The Village Voice's Ben Dellio complimented the alliteration and the elastic bassline of the song, saying that it would have been a better album opener than the title song. Ben Greenbank from Sputnikmusic gave a mixed review, saying that although "Impressive Instant" and "Runaway Lover" from Music were decent songs, they did not have anything special about them. In 2019, Queerty listed "Impressive Instant" as one of the "14 most bizarre, most batshit crazy songs ever recorded" by the singer. Samuel R. Murrian from Parade ranked it at number 99 on his list of Madonna's 100 greatest songs, calling it a "bizarre, trance-inducing electronic symphony".

== Chart performance ==
"Impressive Instant" was not released commercially and was not promoted to radio; therefore it did not appear on any sales or airplay charts of Billboard. It was released to dance clubs as a promo-only single with remixes by Peter Rauhofer on September 18, 2001. The song debuted on the Hot Dance Music/Club Play chart at number 25 on the issue dated October 27, 2001, becoming the "Hot Shot Debut" of the week. The next week, it moved 13 places to number 12 on the chart. The following week, it entered the top-ten at number four. On the Billboard issue dated November 17, 2001, "Impressive Instant" reached the top of the chart, becoming Madonna's 27th number-one song on this chart, the most for any artist. It was the artist's 36th top-ten song on the Hot Dance Music/Club Play tally and her seventh consecutive chart topper, dating from "Nothing Really Matters" in 1999, followed by "Beautiful Stranger" (1999), "American Pie" and "Music" in 2000, and "Don't Tell Me" and "What It Feels Like for a Girl" in 2001.

== Live performances ==
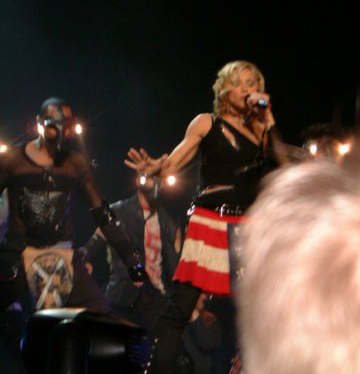
Madonna performing "Impressive Instant" on the Drowned World Tour, flanked by her dancers wearing gas masks and black punk garments

Madonna first performed "Impressive Instant" during the promotional tours for Music. The first of these, was on November 5, 2000, at Roseland Ballroom in New York City, and the other on November 29, 2000, at Brixton Academy in London. Accompanying musicians performing with Madonna included Ahmadzaï on guitar and longtime backing singers Niki Haris and Donna De Lory. Roseland's secondary stage was used for the performance and was decked as a neo-Western wonderland, with bales of hay, yellow-lit horseshoes and silver cacti throughout the lobby and entrance. The stage was draped in an American flag. As the music started, the flag lifted to reveal a white Ford pickup truck from which Madonna emerged, singing "Impressive Instant". Bare-chested male dancers encircled her, as she posed on the hood of the truck and danced. The vocoder effects on Madonna's voice was removed for the live performance, which Jennifer Vineyard from Rolling Stone felt made the singer's vocals sound "less ridiculous". A similar performance was enacted at Brixton Academy.

When Madonna embarked on her Drowned World Tour in 2001, "Impressive Instant" was added as the second song in the set list. The costumes were designed by Jean-Paul Gaultier, and had varied accessories like spiked dog collars, Swarovski crystal-encrusted bracelets and tattered tops. Madonna opened the show with the punk section, wearing tattered black garments and a tartan kilt and belting out the first song, "Drowned World/Substitute for Love". As the song ended, she started with "Impressive Instant", accompanied by her dancers wearing gas masks and encased in rolls of black mesh, chasing the singer around the stage. According to Stuart Lenig, author of the book The Twisted Tale of Glam Rock, Madonna merged choreography with narrative in the performance, as she and her dancers crossed the stage. The 1984-style robotic movements denoted fascism with the dancers stalking and then trying to grope Madonna; in the end one dancer dressed as a robot grabbed a big hosepipe and thrust it between the singer's legs, as it emitted fog towards the audience. Lenig deduced this an act of achieving orgasm or urination towards the crowd. Santiago Fouz-Hernández, one of the authors of the book, Madonna's Drowned Worlds, found similarities with Madonna's exploration of lesbian culture from her earlier work, in the performance of "Impressive Instant". The placement of the fogging machine between her legs were seen as symbolism for phallus and ejaculation, and an example of the singer's insistence on portraying masculinity.

Biographer J. Randy Taraborrelli, author of Madonna: An Intimate Biography, gave a positive review of the performance saying that "defiance being a rock attitude, and one embraced by Madonna, she didn't hesitate in wanting her public to know that she hasn't mellowed over the years". Casper Llewellyn Smith from The Daily Telegraph felt that with the performance of the song, the Drowned World show "picked up pace". In a review for Los Angeles Times, critic Greg Kot said that the "ballistic" response of the audience to the performance of "Impressive Instant" and another song "Candy Perfume Girl" confirmed the crowd's satisfaction regarding the show. A similar review was given by Sal Cinquemani from Slant Magazine, who described the performance as a "virulent and possessive dance routine", which set the tone for the whole show. Alex Needham from NME compared the performance with those by The Royal Ballet. Todd Ramlow from PopMatters criticized Madonna's vocals onstage feeling that she sounded flat during the lower notes of the song. The electronic effects used was received negatively by Ramlow, who felt that the singer should have opted for the addition of backing vocalists. The performance of the song on August 26, 2001, at The Palace of Auburn Hills, outside of Madonna's hometown of Detroit was recorded and released in the live video album, Drowned World Tour 2001 on November 13, 2001.

== Track listing and formats ==
- U.S. promo 12" single (PRO-A-100771)
1. "Impressive Instant" (Peter Rauhofer's Universal Club Mix) – 9:39
2. "Impressive Instant" (Peter Rauhofer's Drowned World Dub) – 8:25
- U.S. promo 12" single (PRO-A-100773-A)
1. "Impressive Instant" (Peter Rauhofer's Universal Dub) – 6:41
2. "Impressive Instant" (Peter Rauhofer's Universal Radio Mixshow Mix) – 5:32
3. "Impressive Instant" (Peter Rauhofer's Drowned World Dub Part 2) – 7:25
- Both of the above 12" Singles were released also in the U.S. with a PROMOTIONAL CD-R counterpart with the same catalog numbers.

== Credits and personnel ==
=== Management ===
- Recorded at Sarm West Studios, Notting Hill, London
- Mixed at Olympic Studios, London
- Mastered at Metropolis Studios, London
- Webo Girl Publishing, Inc., Warner Bros. Music Corp (ASCAP), 1000 Lights Music Ltd, Warner-Tamerlane Publishing Corp. (BMI)

=== Personnel ===
- Madonna – songwriter, vocals, producer
- Mirwais Ahmadzaï – songwriter, producer, programming, keyboards
- Mark "Spike" Stent – recording, mixing
- Tim Young – mastering
- Jake Davis – Pro Tools
- Mark Endert – engineer
- Sean Spuehler – engineer
- Tom Hannen – assistant engineer
- Tim Lambert – assistant engineer

Credits and personnel adapted from Music album liner notes.

== Charts ==
Chart (2001)	Peak position
US Dance Club Songs (Billboard) Peter Rauhofer's Universal Club Mix	1

== See also ==
- List of number-one dance singles of 2001 (U.S.)

== Bibliography ==
- Fouz-Hernández, Santiago; Jarman-Ivens, Freya (2004), Madonna's Drowned Worlds, Ashgate Publishing, Ltd, ISBN 0-7546-3372-1
- Lenig, Stuart (2010), The Twisted Tale of Glam Rock, ABC-CLIO, ISBN 978-0-313-37986-4
- O'Brien, Lucy (2008), Madonna: Like an Icon, Bantam Press, ISBN 978-0-552-15361-4
- Rooksby, Rikky (2004), The Complete Guide to the Music of Madonna, Omnibus Press, ISBN 0-7119-9883-3
- Taraborrelli, Randy J. (2008), Madonna: An Intimate Biography, Simon & Schuster, ISBN 978-0-330-45446-9
