= Drowned World Tour =

2001 concert tour by Madonna

- Tour by Madonna
- Promotional poster for the tour
- Location: Europe; North America
- Associated albums: Ray of Light; Music
- Start date: June 9, 2001
- End date: September 15, 2001
- Legs: 2
- No. of shows: 47
- Box office: US$76.8 million (Note: US$139.64 million in 2025 dollars.)

Madonna concert chronology
- The Girlie Show (1993); Drowned World Tour (2001); Re-Invention World Tour (2004)

The Drowned World Tour (billed as Drowned World Tour 2001) was the fifth concert tour by American singer Madonna, launched in support of her seventh and eighth studio albums, Ray of Light (1998) and Music (2000). It began on June 9, 2001, at the Palau Sant Jordi in Barcelona and concluded on September 15 at the Staples Center in Los Angeles. It marked the singer's first tour in eight years, following the Girlie Show of 1993. Originally planned for 1999, the tour was postponed due to Madonna's involvement in the film The Next Best Thing, her marriage to British director Guy Ritchie, and the birth of their son Rocco.

With just three months to prepare, Madonna assembled a creative team that included choreographers Jamie King and Christian Vincent, and designer Jean Paul Gaultier, who crafted costumes reflecting different phases of her career. The show was divided into four thematic acts —Rock 'n' Roll Punk Girl, Geisha Girl, Cyber Cowgirl, and Spanish Girl/Ghetto Girl— and featured a set list focused on Ray of Light and Music, with only two pre-1990s hits: "Holiday" (1983) and "La Isla Bonita" (1987). Critics praised the production and staging, though some were dissatisfied with the absence of her earlier hits. Grossing $76.8 million ($139.64 million in 2025 dollars) and drawing over 730,000 attendees, it was the highest-grossing solo tour of 2001. A performance filmed in Michigan aired live on HBO and was later released on VHS and DVD as Drowned World Tour 2001.

== Background ==
Following the release of her sixth studio album Bedtime Stories in late 1994, Madonna had initially planned to embark on a concert tour, with Italian newspaper Corriere della Sera reporting in January 1995 that she would visit Italy as part of a tour, set to take place either in the spring or fall of that year. These plans were abandoned in March, however, after Madonna accepted the role of Eva Perón in Alan Parker's film adaptation of Evita, prompting her and her management to cancel all touring activity.

Tour plans resurfaced after the release of her seventh studio album Ray of Light (1998), but a planned 1999 tour was shelved as Madonna focused on motherhood and film commitments. By 2000, she was in a relationship with English film director Guy Ritchie, gave birth to their son Rocco, and released Music, her eight studio album. That November, she signaled her readiness to tour again, stating that she had "ideas of stuff I'd like to do for a big tour. I feel like it's time". In April 2001 she officially announced a world tour—her first in eight years—which came together in just three months.

The Drowned World Tour launched on June 9, 2001, at Barcelona's Palau Sant Jordi and concluded in September 15 at Los Angeles' Staples Center. It was originally scheduled to begin with two shows in Cologne, but those dates were canceled due to technical issues, resulting in 35,000 refunded tickets. Another show in New Jersey was canceled due to illness, reducing the total number of performances from fifty to forty-seven.

== Development ==
=== Conception ===
The tour took its name after J. G. Ballard's 1962 novel and Madonna's 1998 single. Liz Rosenberg stated that it would be her "grandest spectacle to date". It was structured around four distinct thematic acts —Rock 'n' Roll Punk Girl, Geisha Girl, Cyber Cowgirl, and Spanish Girl/Ghetto Girl— each representing a different phase of Madonna's evolving persona. She envisioned the show as a theatrical fusion of influences like martial arts, flamenco, punk, and circus performance. The set list focused primarily on songs from Music and Ray of Light, with only "Holiday" (1983) and "La Isla Bonita" (1987) representing her pre-1990s catalog. This was a deliberate choice by Madonna, who said she did not want the tour to be a "hit parade", instead describing it as a "celebration of my last three records and what I've been doing since Evita".

Madonna personally oversaw dancer auditions in New York alongside choreographer Jamie King and dancer Christian Vincent. King, who was appointed the tour's creative director and official choreographer, later described the experience as so intense that he became physically ill. Having begun guitar lessons in 2000 with musician Monte Pittman, Madonna performed several songs on both acoustic and electric guitar during the show; Pittman also joined her onstage as part of the band. The troupe included longtime backing vocalists Niki Haris and Donna De Lory, along with electronic music producer Stuart Price on bass and keys. Rehearsals ran five days a week, thirteen hours a day. "I don't see the point of doing a show unless you offer something that is going to mind-boggle the senses," Madonna explained, emphasizing that for her, live performance is "all about theatre and drama and surprises and suspenses".

The tour's poster and logo were created by Chase Design Group, who aimed to reflect the show's ethereal and multi-layered nature. Founder Margo Chase described the concert as a "multilayered musical and spiritual journey through diverse worlds", which inspired the team to design a custom icon and typography that captured its unique atmosphere. At Madonna's request, the final design incorporated Arabic and Hebrew elements as a nod to her interest in Kabbalah. Several posters were proposed, but the singer ultimately chose the one that featured a close-up from her "What It Feels Like for a Girl" video.

=== Stage and technical setup ===
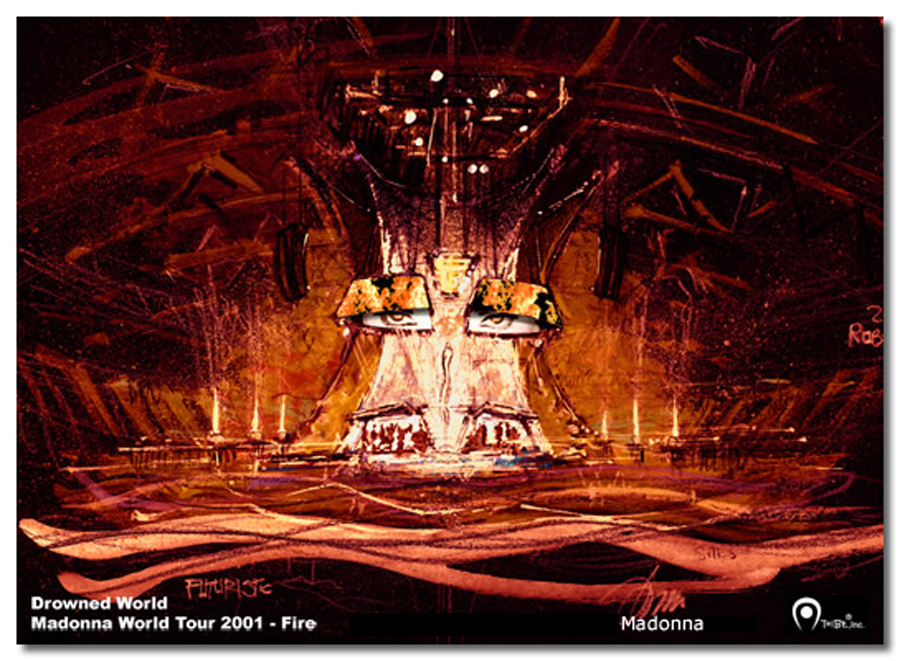
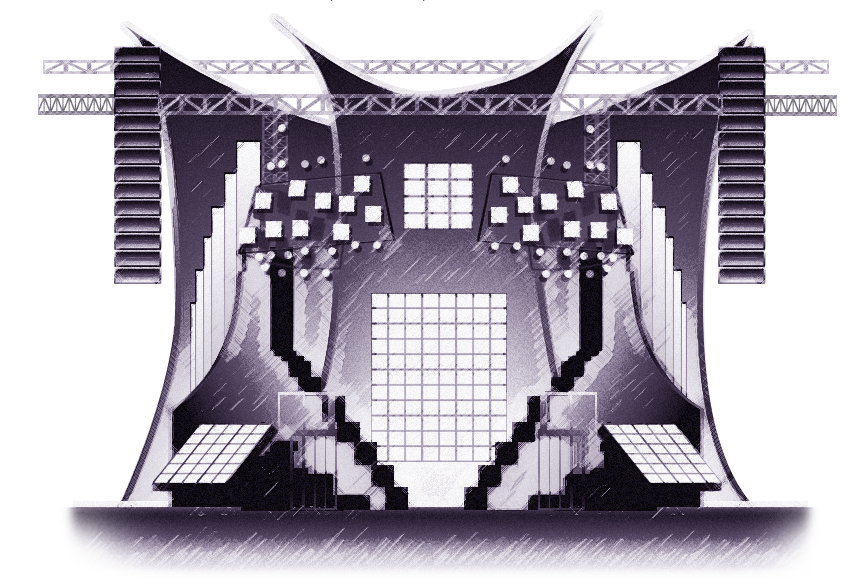
The images depict two sketches created of the stage.

Drowned World was described by production manager Mark Spring as the most complex project he had ever worked on, calling it a "machine on the move". The scale was massive —two Boeing 747s transported the show from Europe to the US, and over 300 cargo vehicles carried more than 100 tons of equipment. The stage, the size of three tennis courts, featured a vast overhead grid of trusses, motors, and video screens, along with props like a mechanical bull and aerial rigging.

The production involved three set-building companies and a crew of over 100 professionals, including lighting techs, sound engineers, dancers, and stylists. Madonna's perfectionism shaped every detail; she personally noticed audio imperfections, leading engineers to experiment with cutting-edge techniques like 14 kHz frequencies and isolated amplifiers. FOH engineer Dave Kob highlighted the show's technical demands and musical diversity —from heavy metal to flamenco— and praised Madonna for singing live throughout, despite the intense choreography. "She's a hard worker," he noted, "and she expects the same from everyone else".

=== Fashion ===
Designer Jean Paul Gaultier was enlisted to create the tour's costumes, blending punk, Scottish, geisha, cowboy, and Spanish influences to match each themed act. His designs included torn shirts and zippered pants as a nod to Madonna's early years, geisha-inspired wigs and makeup from "Nothing Really Matters" (1999), leather chaps over jeans reminiscent of "Don't Tell Me", and outfits that merged elements from "La Isla Bonita" and Evita. Among the more elaborate pieces was a red-and-black, hand-painted kimono with enormous sleeves that extended to a span of approximately 50 feet (15 m) when fully unfurled. The DSquared^{2} duo, Dean and Dan Caten, contributed "ghetto fabulous" looks reflecting Madonna's then-current aesthetic. Longtime stylist Arianne Phillips supervised the wardrobe, designing some pieces herself and collaborating with Gaultier on others. For each segment, three identical versions of Madonna's outfits were made, while dancers had two duplicates of each costume.

== Concert synopsis ==
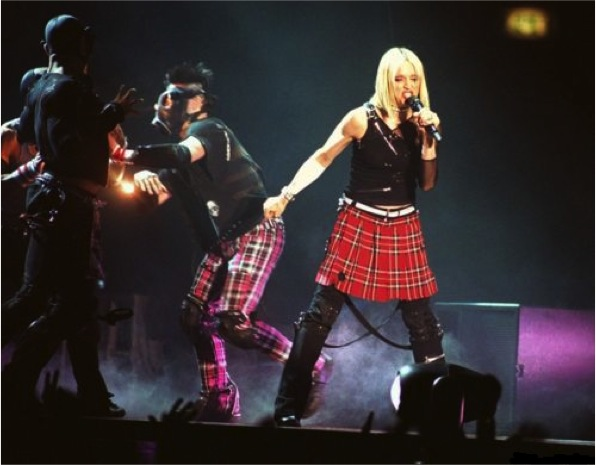
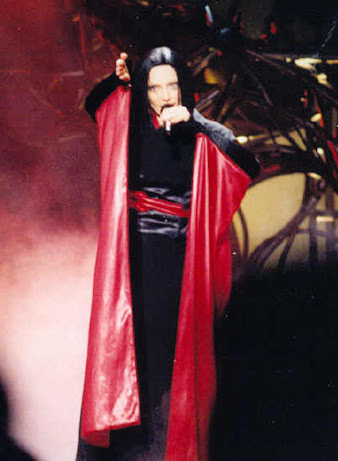
Madonna performing "Impressive Instant" (left) and "Frozen" (right)

The show opened with "Drowned World/Substitute for Love", as Madonna emerged through a cloud of dry ice atop a rising platform wearing punk-inspired attire that included a tartan kilt. She launched into the high-energy "Impressive Instant", surrounded by dancers in gas masks and black mesh. She played electric guitar for "Candy Perfume Girl", then performed "Beautiful Stranger" alongside Haris and De Lory, amid psychedelic visuals from Austin Powers: The Spy Who Shagged Me. The segment closed with an energetic rendition of "Ray of Light".

The mood shifted with a video of Madonna as a geisha set to "Paradise (Not For Me)", accompanied by nearly nude dancers hanging upside down from above the stage. The singer then appeared in a black wig and kimono to perform "Frozen". The opening notes of "Open Your Heart" (1987) led into "Nobody's Perfect", where Madonna portrayed a symbolic act of self-sacrifice. "Mer Girl" transitioned into a fast-paced ninja battle for "Sky Fits Heaven", ending with Madonna grabbing a shotgun and pretending to shoot a dancer. The segment closed with a remix of "What It Feels Like for a Girl," as dancers in anime-inspired costumes flew across the stage, and the screen displayed visuals from Satoshi Kon's 1997 film Perfect Blue, and hentai anime Urotsukidōji.

"I Deserve It" opened the Cyber Cowgirl act. Madonna —dressed in chaps and a cowgirl hat— sat on a bale of hay and played acoustic guitar. She followed with "Don't Tell Me", featuring choreographed line dancing similar to the song's music video. "Human Nature" introduced bondage-themed choreography with a lasso, ending with Madonna riding a mechanical bull. Adopting a mock Southern accent, she playfully addressed the audience before singing "The Funny Song", a satirical piece about cannibalism. She again played guitar for "Secret", set against visuals of riverside baptisms, Sufi dervishes, and Buddhist prayers. The segment closed with a stripped-down take on "Gone", which was replaced by "You'll See" on some American concerts.

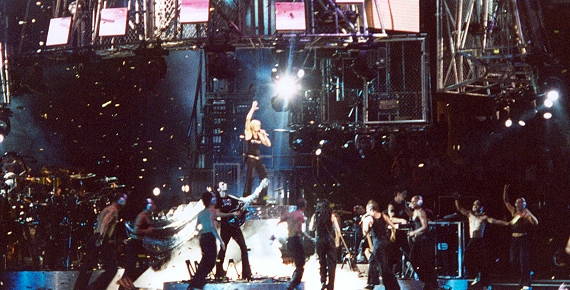
The closing performance of "Music"

The final segment, Spanish Girl/Ghetto Girl, opened with a tango performance set to an instrumental of "Don't Cry for Me Argentina", with candles lining the stage. Madonna appeared atop a rotating leather podium to sing "Lo Que Siente La Mujer", dressed in black trousers and a backless dress. She then played guitar for "La Isla Bonita" accompanied by flamenco dancers. A mashup of "Holiday" and Stardust's "Music Sounds Better With You" (1998) followed, performed with Haris and De Lory. The show closed with "Music", featuring the full cast of dancers, confetti raining from above, and a montage of Madonna's past music videos on the screens. "The End" flashed onscreen to signal the concert's conclusion.

During the European leg, an additional video played after the concert ended, featuring Ali G humorously telling the audience, "[Madonna] ain't comin' back, so go on, piss off", and taking a jab at the Backstreet Boys, quipping that they were performing next and "none of us want to be around for that". The final Los Angeles shows were adjusted in response to the September 11 attacks. Madonna opened the show wearing an American flag kilt as a tribute, the staged shooting in "Mer Girl" was replaced with a gesture of reconciliation, "The Funny Song" was removed from the set list, and all dancers joined for "Holiday".

== Critical response ==
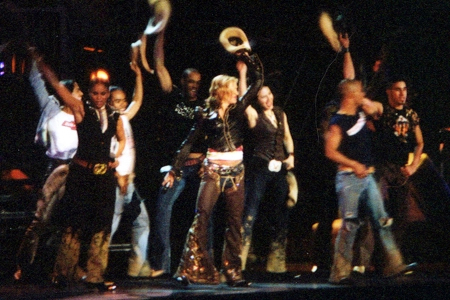
Variety's Phil Gallo considered "Don't Tell Me" to be "the most impressive number of the night".

Critical reviews towards Drowned World were generally positive, with praise given to Madonna's stage presence and the show's theatricality. Rafael Estefanía from BBC Mundo described the opening night in Barcelona as "one of the best shows in a long time", noting that her stage presence remained "as explosive as ever", while El País called it "spectacular" and "shocking". ABC News highlighted Madonna's aerial stunts, and The Independent's Simon O'Hagan wrote that her desire to craft a full spectacle "extended the boundaries of what a rock'n'pop concert can achieve", calling it her most daring tour up to the time. Other praise came from Clarin, Variety, and NME, who commended her work ethic and declared that few artists could match her longevity and influence in pop music.

Critics widely celebrated the tour's technical sophistication. Outlets like El País, musicOMH, and The Independent admired the "shapeshifting" stage, striking visuals, and "superb" lighting. MTV emphasized the importance of costume and theatrics in enhancing the concert experience, while Slant Magazine called the show "technically flawless" and a testament to Madonna's perfectionism. Praise also came for her energy and creative drive. Writers from NME, Variety, and The Guardian noted her innovation and ability to stay ahead of musical trends, with Alex Petridis concluding that the production "befits the world's most famous woman".

Not all responses were glowing. Some critics, including Rafael Estefanía and Entertainment Weekly, noted that the elaborate technology at times overshadowed the music. Argentinean newspaper La Nación criticized the lack of spontaneity and crowd interaction, calling the show "too tightly scripted", while The New York Times' Jon Pareles praised her stronger vocals but criticized her "arrogance" and detachment, remarking that Madonna seemed to disdain the audience. Spin noted the absence of a coherent narrative, and New York magazine found performances like "Nobody's Perfect" and "I Deserve It" underwhelming. Ethan Brown described Madonna as a "frustratingly small stage presence", more often still than commanding.

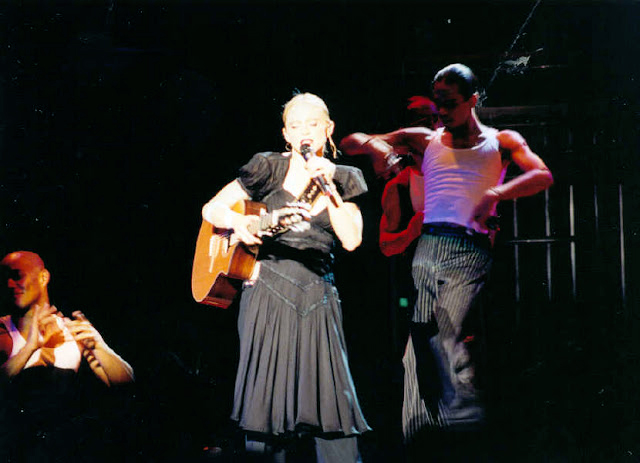
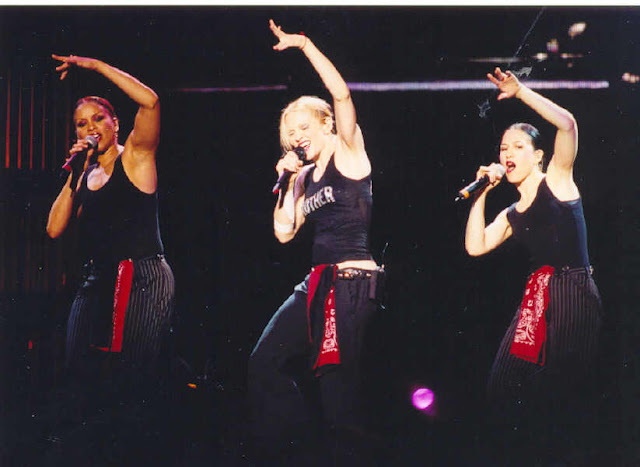
Madonna performing "La Isla Bonita" (left) and "Holiday" (right), the only two pre-1990s songs she included on the tour. The lack of her 1980s material left some critics dissatisfied.

A recurring point among critics was Madonna's decision to omit most of her "classic" 1980s songs. VH1's Christopher Rosa called the lack of classics a disappointment and noted that Madonna "seemed icier than ever". The Guardian's Caroline Sullivan criticized the exclusion of earlier hits, writing that, "no right-thinking person would rather hear 'Candy Perfume Girl' than 'Like a Virgin'". David Nielsen from the San Angelo Standard-Times questioned the logic of skipping signature tracks after such a long touring hiatus. However, several critics defended the move. Slant Magazine's Sal Cinquemani argued that the deeper cuts translated into "edgier numbers", while Alex Petridis praised the defiance of expectations, calling it a gesture "no other stadium-filler could match—imagine the Rolling Stones only playing songs from their last two albums and try not to shudder". Joel Selvin from the San Francisco Chronicle wrote that the material itself was "irrelevant" to the show's impact.

At the 2001 Pollstar awards, Drowned World received nominations for Major Tour of the Year and Most Creative Stage Production, though both honors ultimately went to U2's Elevation Tour. Years later, in a 2024 ranking of Madonna's twelve tours, Sal Cinquemani placed Drowned World fifth, praising its embrace of multimedia innovation and artistic ambition. He noted that, with few older songs included, the tour showcased Madonna's focus on the present and future of her craft.

== Commercial performance, broadcast and recording ==
The Drowned World Tour was limited to Europe and the United States, notably skipping Canada for the first time in the singer's career, due to scheduling conflicts in Toronto. Sponsored by AOL, the tour offered early ticket access to its subscribers before the general sale. Demand was massive: in London, the initial show at Earls Court Exhibition Centre sold out in just fifteen minutes, prompting five additional dates that also sold out within six hours. With over a million hits on Madonna's official website in the first ten minutes and more than 30 million attempted ticket hotline calls —handled by 265 operators— the London dates became some of the fastest-selling shows in UK history. In the US, all dates sold out quickly, including four Los Angeles shows that were gone in just seventeen minutes. With 47 shows and over 730,000 tickets sold, and a gross of $76.8 million ($139.64 million in 2025 dollars), Drowned World was the highest-grossing solo tour of 2001 and the fourth overall, behind U2's Elevation, NSYNC's PopOdyssey, and the Backstreet Boys' Black & Blue Tour.

The August 26 concert at The Palace of Auburn Hills was filmed and broadcast live on HBO as Madonna Live: The Drowned World Tour, marking Madonna's third collaboration with the network after the Blond Ambition and Girlie Show broadcasts. Directed by Hamish Hamilton and produced by Marty Callner, the special drew 5.7 million viewers, becoming HBO's third-highest-rated concert broadcast since 1997. It received two Primetime Emmy nominations and won Best TV Concert at the 2002 AOL TV Viewer Awards. The special was released on VHS and DVD under the title Drowned World Tour 2001 on November 13 —the same day as Madonna's second compilation album GHV2. Featuring cover photography taken by Rosie O'Donnell, the video was praised for its sound but criticized for its visual format. It went on to top Billboard's Top Music Videos chart, and was certified platinum by the Recording Industry Association of America (RIAA) for shipment of more than 100,000 copies.

== Set list ==
Set list, samples and notes adapted per Madonna's official website, the notes and track listing of Drowned World Tour 2001, and additional sources.

Act 1: Rock 'n' Roll Punk Girl

1. "Drowned World/Substitute for Love" (Contains elements of "Don't Tell Me", "Frozen", "Music", "Human Nature", "Ray of Light", and "Impressive Instant")
2. "Impressive Instant"
3. "Candy Perfume Girl"
4. "Beautiful Stranger" (Contains elements of "Soul Bossa Nova (Dim's Space-A-Nova)")
5. "Ray of Light" (Ends with a reprise of "Drowned World/Substitute For Love")

Act 2: Geisha Girl

6. "Paradise (Not for Me)" (Video interlude)
7. "Frozen"
8. "Nobody's Perfect" (With "Open Your Heart" swell)
9. "Mer Girl" (Part 1)
10. "Sky Fits Heaven"
11. "Mer Girl" (Part 2)
12. "What It Feels Like for a Girl" (Remix; video interlude)

Act 3: Cyber Cowgirl

13. "I Deserve It"
14. "Don't Tell Me"
15. "Human Nature"
16. "The Funny Song"
17. "Secret"
18. "Gone"

Act 4: Spanish Girl/Ghetto Girl

19. "Don't Cry for Me Argentina" (Instrumental; dancers interlude)
20. "Lo Que Siente La Mujer" (Spanish version of "What It Feels Like for a Girl")
21. "La Isla Bonita"
22. "Holiday" (Contains elements from "Fate", and "Music Sounds Better with You")
23. "Music" (Contains elements from "Trans-Europe Express")

Notes

- "You'll See" (1995) was performed instead of "Gone" on certain US concerts.
- Following the September 11 attacks, "The Funny Song" was removed from the set list.

== Shows ==
List of concerts
| Date (2001) | City | Country | Venue | Attendance (Tickets sold / available) | Revenue |
|---|---|---|---|---|---|
| June 9 | Barcelona | Spain | Palau Sant Jordi | 36,136 / 36,136 | $2,039,112 |
| June 10 | Barcelona | Spain | Palau Sant Jordi | 36,136 / 36,136 | $2,039,112 |
| June 13 | Milan | Italy | FilaForum | 36,100 / 36,100 | $3,926,815 |
| June 14 | Milan | Italy | FilaForum | 36,100 / 36,100 | $3,926,815 |
| June 15 | Milan | Italy | FilaForum | 36,100 / 36,100 | $3,926,815 |
| June 19 | Berlin | Germany | Max-Schmeling-Halle | 43,455 / 43,455 | $2,864,786 |
| June 20 | Berlin | Germany | Max-Schmeling-Halle | 43,455 / 43,455 | $2,864,786 |
| June 22 | Berlin | Germany | Max-Schmeling-Halle | 43,455 / 43,455 | $2,864,786 |
| June 23 | Berlin | Germany | Max-Schmeling-Halle | 43,455 / 43,455 | $2,864,786 |
| June 26 | Paris | France | Palais Omnisports de Paris-Bercy | 68,000 / 68,000 | $4,443,155 |
| June 27 | Paris | France | Palais Omnisports de Paris-Bercy | 68,000 / 68,000 | $4,443,155 |
| June 29 | Paris | France | Palais Omnisports de Paris-Bercy | 68,000 / 68,000 | $4,443,155 |
| June 30 | Paris | France | Palais Omnisports de Paris-Bercy | 68,000 / 68,000 | $4,443,155 |
| July 4 | London | England | Earls Court Exhibition Centre | 107,415 / 107,415 | $8,734,149 |
| July 6 | London | England | Earls Court Exhibition Centre | 107,415 / 107,415 | $8,734,149 |
| July 7 | London | England | Earls Court Exhibition Centre | 107,415 / 107,415 | $8,734,149 |
| July 9 | London | England | Earls Court Exhibition Centre | 107,415 / 107,415 | $8,734,149 |
| July 10 | London | England | Earls Court Exhibition Centre | 107,415 / 107,415 | $8,734,149 |
| July 12 | London | England | Earls Court Exhibition Centre | 107,415 / 107,415 | $8,734,149 |
| July 21 | Philadelphia | United States | First Union Center | 31,128 / 31,128 | $3,382,485 |
| July 22 | Philadelphia | United States | First Union Center | 31,128 / 31,128 | $3,382,485 |
| July 25 | New York City | United States | Madison Square Garden | 79,401 / 79,401 | $9,297,105 |
| July 26 | New York City | United States | Madison Square Garden | 79,401 / 79,401 | $9,297,105 |
| July 28 | New York City | United States | Madison Square Garden | 79,401 / 79,401 | $9,297,105 |
| July 30 | New York City | United States | Madison Square Garden | 79,401 / 79,401 | $9,297,105 |
| July 31 | New York City | United States | Madison Square Garden | 79,401 / 79,401 | $9,297,105 |
| August 2 | East Rutherford | United States | Continental Airlines Arena | 16,457 / 16,457 | $1,842,155 |
| August 7 (Note: The August 7 show in Boston was originally scheduled to take place one day earlier but was postponed.) | Boston | United States | FleetCenter | 29,886 / 29,886 | $3,503,520 |
| August 8 | Boston | United States | FleetCenter | 29,886 / 29,886 | $3,503,520 |
| August 10 | Washington, D.C. | United States | MCI Center | 32,061 / 32,061 | $3,472,148 |
| August 11 | Washington, D.C. | United States | MCI Center | 32,061 / 32,061 | $3,472,148 |
| August 14 | Sunrise | United States | National Car Rental Center | 31,572 / 31,572 | $3,603,573 |
| August 15 | Sunrise | United States | National Car Rental Center | 31,572 / 31,572 | $3,603,573 |
| August 19 | Atlanta | United States | Philips Arena | 29,617 / 29,617 | $3,553,444 |
| August 20 | Atlanta | United States | Philips Arena | 29,617 / 29,617 | $3,553,444 |
| August 25 | Auburn Hills | United States | The Palace of Auburn Hills | 35,407 / 35,407 | $4,127,533 |
| August 26 | Auburn Hills | United States | The Palace of Auburn Hills | 35,407 / 35,407 | $4,127,533 |
| August 28 | Chicago | United States | United Center | 33,725 / 33,725 | $3,743,830 |
| August 29 | Chicago | United States | United Center | 33,725 / 33,725 | $3,743,830 |
| September 1 | Las Vegas | United States | MGM Grand Garden Arena | 29,587 / 29,587 | $6,503,950 |
| September 2 | Las Vegas | United States | MGM Grand Garden Arena | 29,587 / 29,587 | $6,503,950 |
| September 5 | Oakland | United States | The Arena in Oakland | 31,195 / 31,195 | $3,351,320 |
| September 6 | Oakland | United States | The Arena in Oakland | 31,195 / 31,195 | $3,351,320 |
| September 9 | Los Angeles | United States | Staples Center | 61,464 / 61,464 | $8,303,165 |
| September 13 | Los Angeles | United States | Staples Center | 61,464 / 61,464 | $8,303,165 |
| September 14 | Los Angeles | United States | Staples Center | 61,464 / 61,464 | $8,303,165 |
| September 15 (Note: The show of September 15 in Los Angeles was originally scheduled to take place on September 11, but was postponed due to the terrorist attacks.) | Los Angeles | United States | Staples Center | 61,464 / 61,464 | $8,303,165 |
| Total | | | | 731,606 / 731,606 (100%) | $76,792,245 |

=== Cancelled dates ===
List of cancelled concerts
| Date (2001) | City | Country | Venue | Reason |
|---|---|---|---|---|
| June 5 | Cologne | Germany | Kölnarena | Technical problems |
| June 6 | Cologne | Germany | Kölnarena | Technical problems |
| August 3 | East Rutherford | United States | Continental Airlines Arena | Illness |

== Personnel ==
Adapted from the Drowned World Tour 2001 program.

=== Band ===
- Madonna – creator, vocals, guitar
- Niki Haris – vocals
- Donna De Lory – vocals
- Stuart Price – musical director, keyboards, guitar
- Michael McKnight – programmer, keyboards
- Marcus Brown – keyboards
- Monte Pittman – guitar
- Ron Powell – percussions
- Steve Sidelnyk – drums

=== Dancers ===
- Christian Vincent – head dancer
- Ruthy Inchaustegui – dancer
- Nito Larioza – dancer
- Tamara Levinson – dancer
- Marlyn Ortiz – dancer
- Anthony Jay Rodriguez – dancer
- Jamal Story – dancer
- Kemba Shannon – dancer
- Eko Supriyanto – dancer
- Jull Weber – dancer
- Addie Yungmee- dancer

=== Choreographers ===
- Jamie King – choreographer
- Alex Magno – choreographer
- Kelly Parker – assistant choreographer
- Debra Brown – aerial choreographer
- Leslie DeWhurst – assistant aerial choreographer
- Stefanie Roos – associate choreographer
- Taimak Guerreillo – Martial arts coordinator
- Ho Sung Pak – assistant to Martial arts coordinator

=== Wardrobe ===
- Jean Paul Gaultier – designer
- Arianne Phillips – designer
- Dean and Dan Caten – designer

=== Crew ===
- Hamish Hamilton – broadcast director
- Jamie King – stage production director
- Joyce Fleming – creative technical consultant
- Tif'nie Olson – assistant to director
- William Orbit – engineer
- Mirwais Ahmadzaï – engineer
- Pat McCarthy – engineer
- Mark "Spike" Stent – engineer
- Caresse Henry – artist management
- Shari Goldschmidt – business management
- Richard Feldstein – business management
- LeeAnn Hard – business management
- Liz Rosenberg – publicist
- Chris Littleton – tour manager
- Arianne Phillips – stylist
- Luigi Murenu – stylist
- Rita Marmo – stylist
- Klexius Kolby – make-up
- Julie Harris – make-up
- Joseph kale – art director
- Peter Morse lighting director
- Jake Davies – sound design
- Carol Dodds – video director
- Edwin Stern – yoga instructor
- Kevin Reagan – tour book design
- Rosie O'Donnell – cover photo

== See also ==
- List of highest-grossing concert tours by women

== Literary sources ==
- Aguilar, Marcela (2010). Domadores de historias: Conversaciones con grandes cronistas de América Latina (in Spanish). RIL Editores. ISBN 978-956-284-782-7.
- Ciccone, Christopher; Leigh, Wendy (2008). Life with My Sister Madonna. Simon Spotlight Entertainment. ISBN 978-1-4165-8762-0.
- Clerk, Carol (2002). Madonnastyle. Omnibus Press. ISBN 978-0-7119-8874-3.
- Fouz-Hernández, Santiago; Jarman-Ivens, Freya (2004). Madonna's Drowned Worlds. Ashgate Publishing. ISBN 978-0-7546-3372-3.
- Guilbert, Georges-Claude (2002). Madonna as postmodern myth. McFarland. ISBN 978-0-7864-1408-6.
- Metz, Allen; Benson, Carol (1999). The Madonna Companion: Two Decades of Commentary. Music Sales Group. ISBN 978-0-8256-7194-4.
- O'Brien, Lucy (2008). Madonna: Like an Icon. Bantam Press. ISBN 978-0-593-05547-2.
- Orgill, Roxanne (2001). Shout, Sister, Shout! Ten Girl Singers who Shaped a Century. Simon & Schuster. ISBN 0-689-81991-9.
- Dougher, Sarah; Berger, Joshua (2008). 100 Habits of Successful Graphic Designers. Rockport Publishers. ISBN 978-1-56496-977-4.
- Taraborrelli, J. Randy (2002). Madonna: An Intimate Biography. Simon & Schuster. ISBN 978-0-425-18669-5.
- Taraborrelli, Randy J. (2018). Madonna: An Intimate Biography of an Icon at Sixty. Macmillan Publishers. ISBN 978-1509842797.
- Young, Clive (2004). Crank It up: Live Sound Secrets of The Top Tour Engineers. Hal Leonard Corporation. ISBN 0-87930-778-1.
