= What It Feels Like for a Girl =

2001 single by Madonna

Single by Madonna

from the album Music
- B-side: "Lo Que Siente la Mujer"
- Released: April 9, 2001
- Studio: Sarm West (London)
- Genre: Glitch pop; synth pop; electronic music
- Length: 4:43
- Label: Maverick; Warner Bros.
- Songwriters: Madonna; Guy Sigsworth; David Torn
- Producers: Madonna; Guy Sigsworth; Mark "Spike" Stent

Madonna singles chronology
"Don't Tell Me" (2000)	"What It Feels Like for a Girl" (2001)	"Die Another Day" (2002)

Music video
- "What It Feels Like for a Girl" on YouTube

"What It Feels Like for a Girl" is a song recorded by American singer Madonna for her eighth studio album Music (2000). It was released as the third and final single from the album on April 9, 2001, by Maverick Records and Warner Bros. Records. It was written and produced by Madonna and Guy Sigsworth, with David Torn as co-writer, and Mark "Spike" Stent as a co-producer. A mid-tempo electronic, synth-pop and glitch pop song, it lyrically conveys society's double standard toward women, addressing hurtful myths about female inferiority. To emphasize the message, the song opens with a spoken word sample by actress Charlotte Gainsbourg from the 1993 British film The Cement Garden. A Spanish version of the track, "Lo Que Siente la Mujer", was translated by Alberto Ferreras and included in the Latin American edition of Music.

"What It Feels Like for a Girl" received acclaim from most music critics, who declared it as a highlight from the album, while also remarking it as one of the most mature musical ventures of Madonna's career. Commercially, the song reached the top 10 in Australia, Canada, Denmark, Finland, Iceland, Romania, Spain, Scotland and the UK. In the US, it peaked at number 23 on the Billboard Hot 100 and atop the Dance Club Songs.

An accompanying music video for "What It Feels Like for a Girl" was directed by Madonna's then-husband Guy Ritchie and premiered on March 22, 2001. It features the singer as a reckless woman on a crime spree. The video was criticized for its depiction of violence and abuse, which caused MTV to ban it before 9:00 pm. The single was also released on DVD and became the highest weekly sales for a DVD release in the United States. Madonna performed the track on the promotional concerts for Music in November 2000 and on her 2001 Drowned World Tour, where a remixed version was used as a video interlude and also performed in Spanish. The song was covered by the actors of television series Glee, during the episode "The Power of Madonna", and was included in the accompanying EP.

== Background and development ==
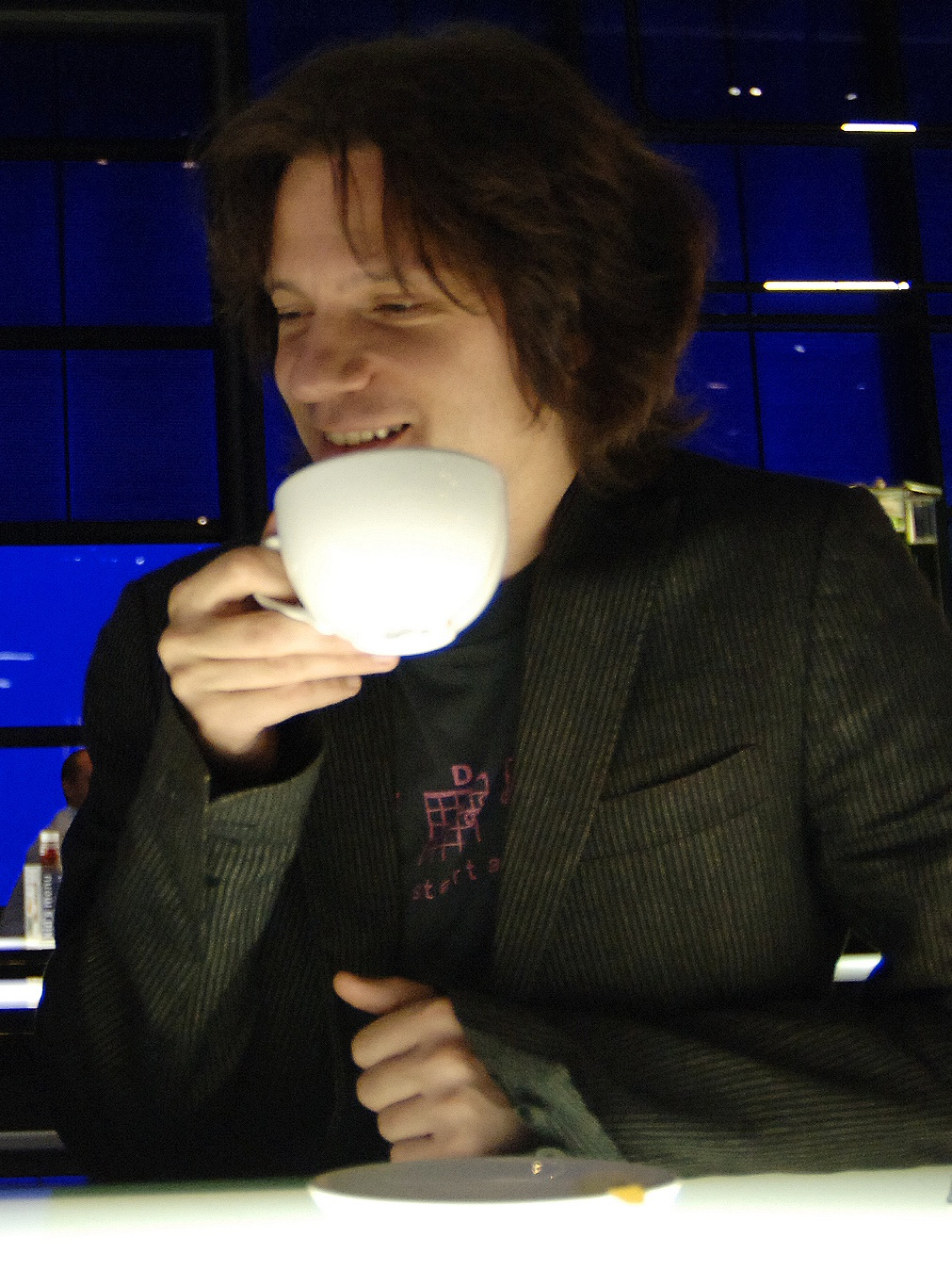
Guy Sigsworth (pictured in 2007), one of the main producers of "What It Feels Like for a Girl"

After the critical and commercial success of her seventh studio album, Ray of Light (1998), Madonna had intended to embark on a concert tour in September 1999, but the tour was cancelled due to the delay of her film The Next Best Thing (2000). She released one-off singles like "Beautiful Stranger" (1999) and a cover of Don McLean's "American Pie" (2000). The singer also became pregnant with her son Rocco, from her relationship with director Guy Ritchie. Wanting to distract herself from the media frenzy, Madonna concentrated on the development of her eighth studio album, Music.

In April 2000, it was announced that French musician Mirwais Ahmadzaï was creating a melding of dance and pop songs with a disco feel for the album. Later, it was also announced that Madonna enlisted Guy Sigsworth to work with her on the album. The singer had followed Sigsworth's work, admired his love of understated technology in music, and contacted him for adding an ambient feel to her record. Madonna played him the rough demo tracks developed for Music, including the songs created with Ahmadzaï. The idea for "What It Feels Like for a Girl" came to Madonna when she was halfway through her pregnancy and was trying to keep the media from finding out. Sigsworth sent her a demo backing track containing a sample from the 1993 British film The Cement Garden, directed by Andrew Birkin, in which the voice of actress Charlotte Gainsbourg speaks softly, "Girls can wear jeans and cut their hair short, wear shirts and boots. 'Cause it's OK to be a boy. But for a boy to look like a girl is degrading. 'Cause you think that being a girl is degrading. But secretly you'd love to know what it's like... Wouldn't you? What it feels like for a girl".

Madonna listened to the phrase uttered by Gainsbourg and started writing the song and the melody, resulting in "What It Feels Like for a Girl", a track described by her as a complaint about the politics of sexes. She was going through some emotional turmoil due to living on a different continent than her husband Guy Ritchie. Due to her pregnancy she decided to move to England to be close to him. "Being the girl, I made the first compromise. It's that extra thing that [women] have. I don't think that we're better than men, but I believe there's an extra accommodating chromosome", she told Interview's Ingrid Sischy. Madonna reflected on how her generation of women had been encouraged to be independent, be educated and take over any opportunity life bestowed upon them. But she had realized that being a smart and accomplished woman can come across as threat to men, thereby making them a casualty. Madonna questioned, "Why didn't somebody tell me? Why didn't somebody warn me?' And that's also what that song is about—swallowing that bitter pill... It was a combination of that, and also just feeling incredibly vulnerable that inspired the song."

== Recording and composition ==
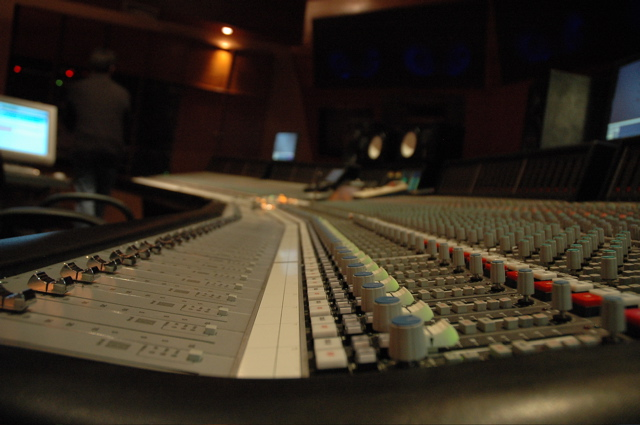
A SSL 9000 J console was used for recording the song at Sarm West Studios.

Sigsworth's demo track was the second of two sketches presented to Madonna, and she chose the one with the sample from The Cement Garden. It was almost finished but was still kept unpolished so that the singer could continue writing on top of it. He recorded the track at Sarm West Studios rather than his own studio since he did not want to "fuck up" working with Madonna. The song was finished quickly and within four days they were able to create the final version. From the first day onward Madonna and Sigsworth decided to keep all the musical noises from the demo. So the producer had to find a way to reposition Madonna's vocals around the segments, utilizing Pro Tools on a SSL 9000 J console. Madonna insisted Sigsworth to give her a rough approximate sound, rather than work on the music for two-three hours. That way they would know if it can be kept or rejected and save time on production. During recording, Sigsworth noticed that the verses were out of sync with the music and wanted to add extra bar which would help them be coherent. However Madonna dismissed it, and he had to cut up the individual music to put it in his computer for accompanying her vocals. Sigsworth thought it made the song sound more "fluid and magical" and commended Madonna for not taking the cop-out solution.

"What It Feels Like for a Girl" is an electronic, synth-pop and glitch pop semi-ballad. Madonna and Sigsworth were listed as songwriters and producers on the track with additional production by Mark "Spike" Stent. American guitarist David Torn was credited as an additional songwriter after Madonna found out Sigsworth had sampled from Torn's 1987 album, Cloud About Mercury. Stent recorded "What It Feels Like for a Girl" using a Sony 3348 HR and a BASF 931 tape. He mixed it at London's Olympic Studios using SSL G Series Quantegy magnetic tapes. Tim Young mastered the track at Metropolis Studio at Westminster, London.

'What It Feels Like for a Girl'
A sample of "What It Feels Like For a Girl", a midtempo track with lyrics inviting listeners to imagine themselves as girls. The sample illustrates the drum sounds and the rhythm section supported by string pads. It also illustrates when the drums are pulled out just before the chorus starts.

According to the sheet music published by Musicnotes.com, the song is set in common time, with a tempo of 104 beats per minutes. It's set in the key of E♭ major, with Madonna's vocals spanning from the lower octave of G_{3} to the higher note of B♭_{4}. The song has a sequence of D♭_{maj9}–E♭–E♭/F–A♭ during the verses and F_{9sus4}–A♭–D♭_{maj9}–E♭ during the chorus as its chord progression. The track begins with Gainsbourg's monologue which is followed by drum sounds, a rhythm section supported by string pads, and the chord sequence which highlights the melody. Madonna sings over a synth line the first verse, "Silky smooth lips as sweet as candy, baby/Tight blue jeans, skin that shows in patches" in a mellow and feminine tone, which is driven by a "cool beat" and filtered bass licks. The ambient production has a number of sounds floating in-and-out of the track, long echos and vocals being pulled back.

As the pre-chorus ends, the drums are pulled out and added immediately the chorus starts, washed over by tidal keys and pads, and Madonna asking the question, "Do you know what it feels like for a girl?". Phil Dellio from The Village Voice noticed the presence of "gossamer-like" synthesizer in the background, while author Rikky Rooksby highlighted the equalized bass guitar in the center of the production. Another characteristic Sigsworth feature is the sound of a CD player "skipping" during the song. A Spanish version of the track, titled "Lo Que Siente la Mujer" (English: What a Woman Feels), was translated by Alberto Ferreras and included as the B-side of the US CD maxi single release, as well as on the bonus disc of the 2001 Special Tour edition of Music and as a bonus track on the Mexican and Latin American editions. Stan Hawkins, author of Critical Musicological Reflections, felt that by switching "girl" to "woman" in the Spanish version, Madonna had "upgraded" its nature. Lyrically, "What It Feels Like for a Girl" condemns male chauvinism by addressing hurtful myths about female inferiority and female role-playing in society, with the singer inviting men to imagine themselves as girls.

== Release and remixes ==
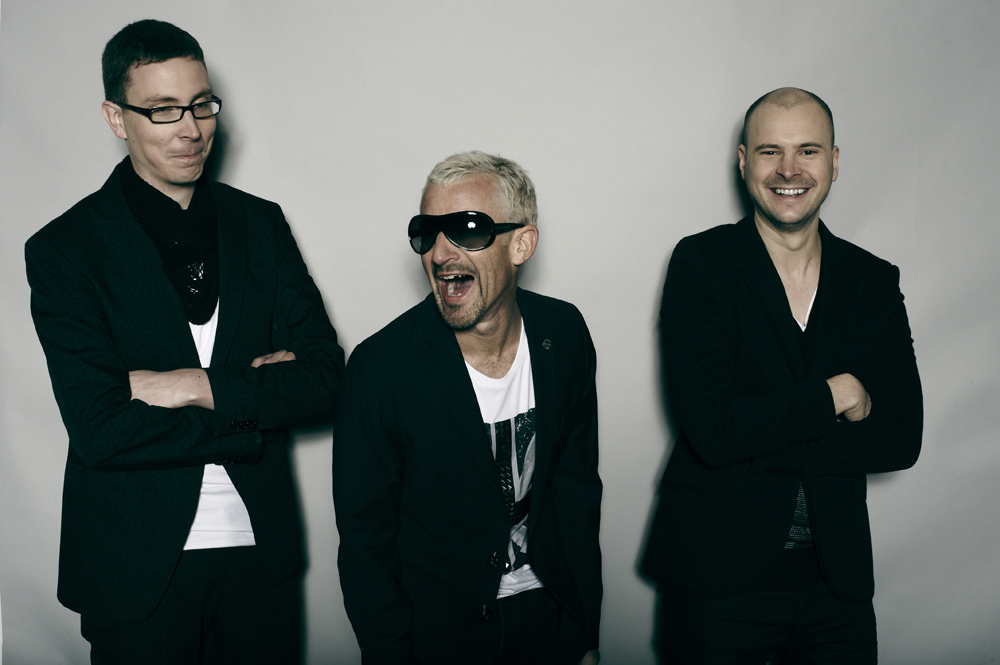
English group Above & Beyond (pictured in 2011) created one of the official remixes of the song.

"What It Feels Like for a Girl" was initially planned to be the album's second single, but "Don't Tell Me" was chosen instead. The song was eventually released as the album's third single on April 16, 2001. Upon release, several remixes were commissioned, created by Above & Beyond, Victor Calderone, Richard "Humpty" Vission, Paul Oakenfold and Tracy Young. The "Velvet Masta Mix", created by Richard Vission, gave the song a bass-heavy intro and a funkier groove. Vission recalled that Madonna had turned down his first mix and asked him to redo it again. Calderone's "Dark Side Mix" was more mellow, relying more on percussions while Tracy Young's mix included stringed harp instrumentation. AllMusic's Jose F. Promis praised in particular the Oakenfold version for "transforming the song into a massive, deep arena club stomper". The Above & Beyond remix, which was used for the music video, features "hard and rhythmic" pumping beats and removed Madonna's verses, leaving only the chorus and repeating the Charlotte Gainsbourg sample several times in the middle. It peaked at number 14 on the VG-lista in Norway.

Production duo Thunderpuss was hired to do an official remix of "What It Feels Like for a Girl". However, when they were almost finished, an unofficial remix, credited as "The Thunderpuss Mix", leaked on the internet. During an interview with About.com, Barry Harris from the group recalled that they had been working on the remix and were waiting for it to be approved when they received a call from Warner Bros. Records, informing them that the remix was circulating in the internet. Both Chris Cox and Harris tried to find out the issue and concluded that someone had retitled the original with their group's name and released it. Thunderpuss tried to convince the record label executives but failed and the remix was canceled.

== Critical reception ==
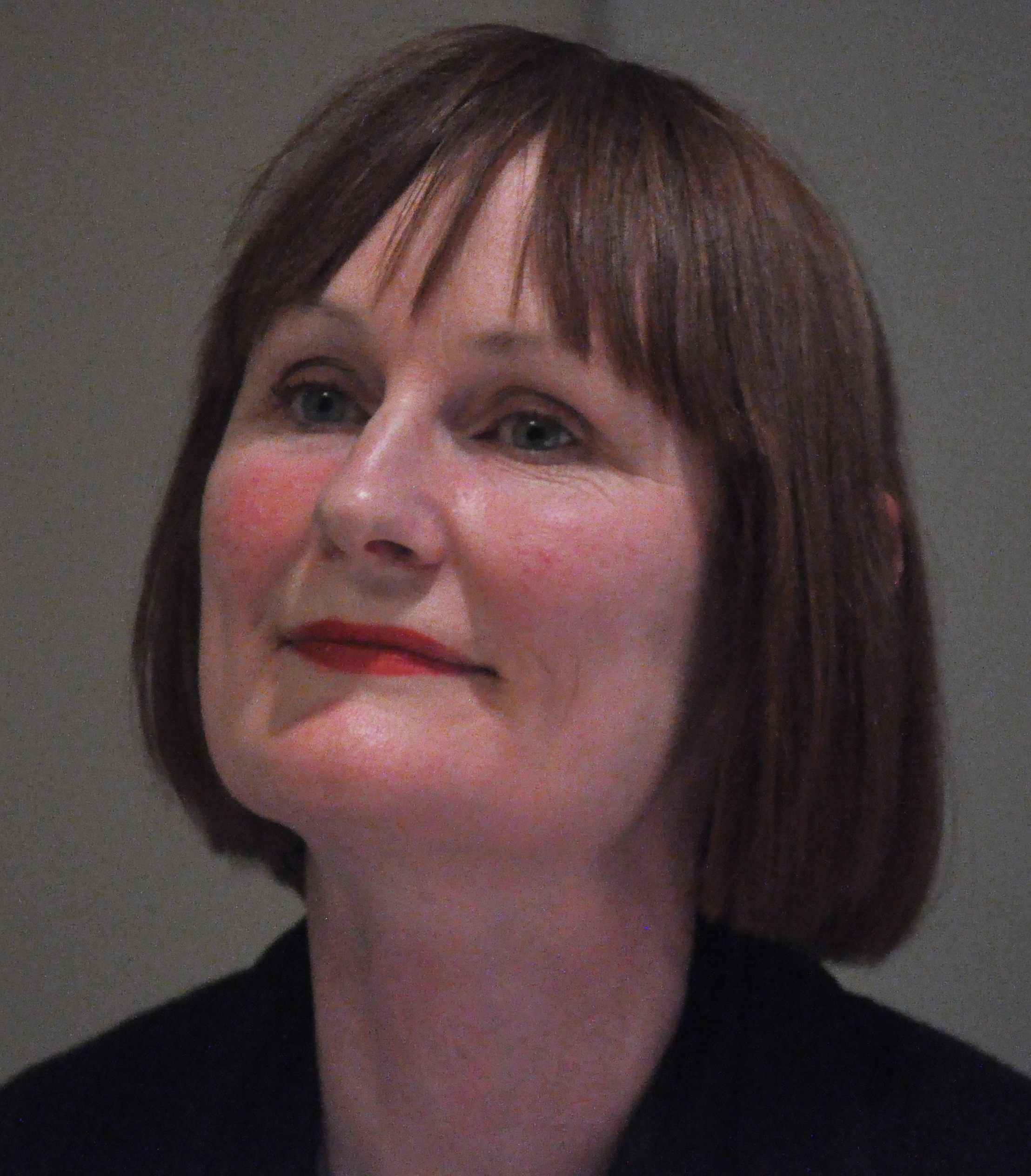
Lucy O'Brien (pictured in 2012) praised the track in her book Madonna: Like an Icon.

Upon release, the song received general acclaim from music critics. Rikky Rooksby wrote in his book, The Complete Guide to the Music of Madonna (2004), that "What It Feels Like for a Girl" was the best track on Music. Author Lucy O'Brien described the song as having a "beautifully executed sense of anger" in her 2007 biography, Madonna: Like an Icon. Likening it to Madonna's 1989 single "Express Yourself", O'Brien called it a "femme-pop" song. AllMusic's Stephen Thomas Erlewine picked it as one of the album's highlights, calling it a "terrific midtempo cut". Slant's Sal Cinquemani felt that "Madonna has revealed more of herself than ever [in Music]. No longer shrouded with pedantic spirituality, she has become even more human [...] revealing her soul on 'What It Feels Like For A Girl'". However, on his review of GHV2 (2001), Cinquemani felt the track was "largely lost amid the conventional sonics of Music's final single" and called it that compilation's least dynamic offering, giving a C− rating. Eric Henderson, from the same magazine, wrote that "occasionally, and only occasionally, Madonna's reach exceeds her grasp. 'What It Feels Like for a Girl' is one of those cases. Its intentions feel more fully fleshed out in the controversial music video than they do in the song itself".

Nathan Smith from Houston Press opined it was "one of the realest and most mature vocal performances of her career as she gently explores the double standard faced by ambitious women". From Gay Star News, Joe Morgan called it a "clear reminder that Madonna can write some incredible lyrics". Writing for Entertainment Weekly, journalist David Browne relegated the track as "an older, wiser 'Into the Groove'", highlighting its "softly padding beat and genuinely empathetic lyrics". Q magazine's Danny Eccleston picked it as a standout track, claiming it had "the vaguest melodic echo of Basement Jaxx's terrific 'On & On'". Cynthia Funchs of PopMatters picked the song as her favorite on the album, calling it "outstanding" with "sweet, enchanted beats". Eamon Sweeney of Hot Press, found it similar, in tone and texture, to Natalie Imbruglia's 1998 single "Smoke". Jon Pareles of The New York Times called it "Madonna's quasi-feminist statement". Rolling Stone's Barry Walters called it "as musically gentle as it is lyrically barbed".

Garry Mulholland of The Guardian, praised its "melancholy atmosphere and ambiguous air". Also from The Guardian, Maddy Costa thought that the track was "exquisite", adding "on 'What It Feels Like for a Girl' you feel is the Madonna of old, talking about being a pop bitch and making you tingle even with its hackneyed lyrics". Writing for Billboard, Larry Flick hailed it "a hook-laden midtempo jam [...] that should give the Britney/Christina generation of teenage female listeners a little food for thought", highlighting its "motherly, nurturing perspective". Also from Billboard, Chuck Taylor named it "one of the more substantive – and mature – musical ventures of [Madonna's] career", while panning its remix version for "reduc[ing] the song to a mindless trickle of beats without any hints of the verses". Alex Pappademas from Spin, pointed out that the song "flaunts the sexiest synth shimmer this side of [Aguilera's] 'Genie in a Bottle'". The Village Voice's Phil Dellio found the song to be "the perfect answer record to [the novel] The Virgin Suicides (where boys indeed stand on the side of the street looking uncomprehendingly towards girls)". In a retrospective review of its parent album, Pitchfork's Shaad D'Souza characterized "What It Feels Like for a Girl" as "something like Madonna's take on a Dido ballad, with plush synths wrapped around the album's purest, most traditional hook" and a "beautiful yet slightly baffling song", concluding: "Then again, it's not a song of empowerment so much as a plea. [...] The lyrics are universal, but still hard to separate from the memory of the brazen, armored pop star who debuted in 1982, so consciously invulnerable to the standards of the world around her."

== Accolades ==
While listing "The 100 Greatest Madonna Songs", Louis Virtel from The Backlot ranked "What It Feels Like for a Girl" at number 45, saying that "its tenderness and power resonated like no Madonna ballad since 'Take a Bow'". In 2013, Scott Kearnan of Boston.com included it at number 26 on his list of "30 Ultimate Madonna Singles"; he wrote that "Madonna's covered plenty of ground about how women are treated in the world, but she's rarely this unfiltered". The same year, Edward Cheung from PopMatters ranked it as the sixth best production by Guy Sigsworth, writing that "an excellently placed spoken word sample (delivered by Charlotte Gainsbourg) and a keening synth line immediately set the tone for Madge's track as fashionably lonely". Matthew Jacob's from The Huffington Post ranked the track at number 51 on his list "The Definitive Ranking of Madonna Singles", pointing out its "meaningful lyrical accomplishment".

While ranking Madonna's singles in honor of her 60th birthday, in August 2018, Jude Rogers from The Guardian placed the track at number 37 and wrote that "it sounds like a Saint Etienne song accidentally covered by a superstar". Entertainment Weekly's Chuck Arnold called it "one of Madonna's artistic peaks" and her "most underappreciated" release; he listed it as her 14th best single. In 2019, Samuel R. Murrian from Parade ranked it at number 16 on his list of the singer's 100 greatest songs: "Lyrically barbed but sonically soft, one of Madonna's most radical tracks explores the brutality of being a woman in a man's world. [...] Though it was recorded nearly two decades before the #MeToo movement, this track feels like an anthem for it. Madonna was, and is, ahead of her time".

== Chart performance ==
"What It Feels Like for a Girl" debuted at number 73 on the US Billboard Hot 100 chart of May 5, 2001, and moved to number 46 the following week, becoming in the biggest leap of that week. The release of the DVD single, CD maxi and 12-inch vinyl prompted the song to debut at number 15 on the Hot 100 Singles Sales chart with 6,600 copies, majority being from the DVD single becoming the highest one-week sales for a DVD single sales. The song peaked at number 23 on the issue dated May 19, 2001, becoming that week's greatest gainer in sales. The same week, it also reached the top of the Dance Club Songs chart. At the year-end ranking for 2001, the song placed at number 24 on Dance Club Songs. According to Madonna's official website since only a maxi single was released commercially, it hindered the chart placement on Billboard Hot 100. In Canada, the song debuted at number 14 on the Canadian Singles Chart, and reached a peak of number two after two weeks later.

In Australia, "What It Feels Like for a Girl" debuted and peaked at number six on the ARIA Charts, on May 6, 2001, and was present in the top-fifty for nine weeks, and was ranked number 84 on the year-end placements. The track also reached the top of the Australian dance charts. It was certified Gold by the Australian Recording Industry Association (ARIA) for shipment of 35,000 copies of the single. The song debuted at number 50 on the New Zealand Singles Chart, and reached a peak of number 15 after six weeks.

In the United Kingdom, "What It Feels Like for a Girl" managed to become the third song from Music to peak inside the top-ten, reaching number seven on April 28, 2001. According to the Official Charts Company, it has sold 86,771 copies in the country as of August 2008. The song was successful across Europe, reaching the top-ten of the charts in Denmark, Finland, Italy, Netherlands and Spain. However, in some countries, "What It Feels Like for a Girl" failed to reach the top-twenty. In Austria and Sweden, the song reached numbers 26 and 22, respectively, becoming her lowest-charting single since "Nothing Really Matters" (1999) in both countries. In France, the song debuted and peaked at number 40 on the French Singles Chart, and descended rapidly. The track managed to reach the top-ten of the European Hot 100 Singles chart, reaching number eight on May 5, 2001. It was also the most played song on European radios, holding the top position for five weeks.

== Music video ==
=== Background and synopsis ===
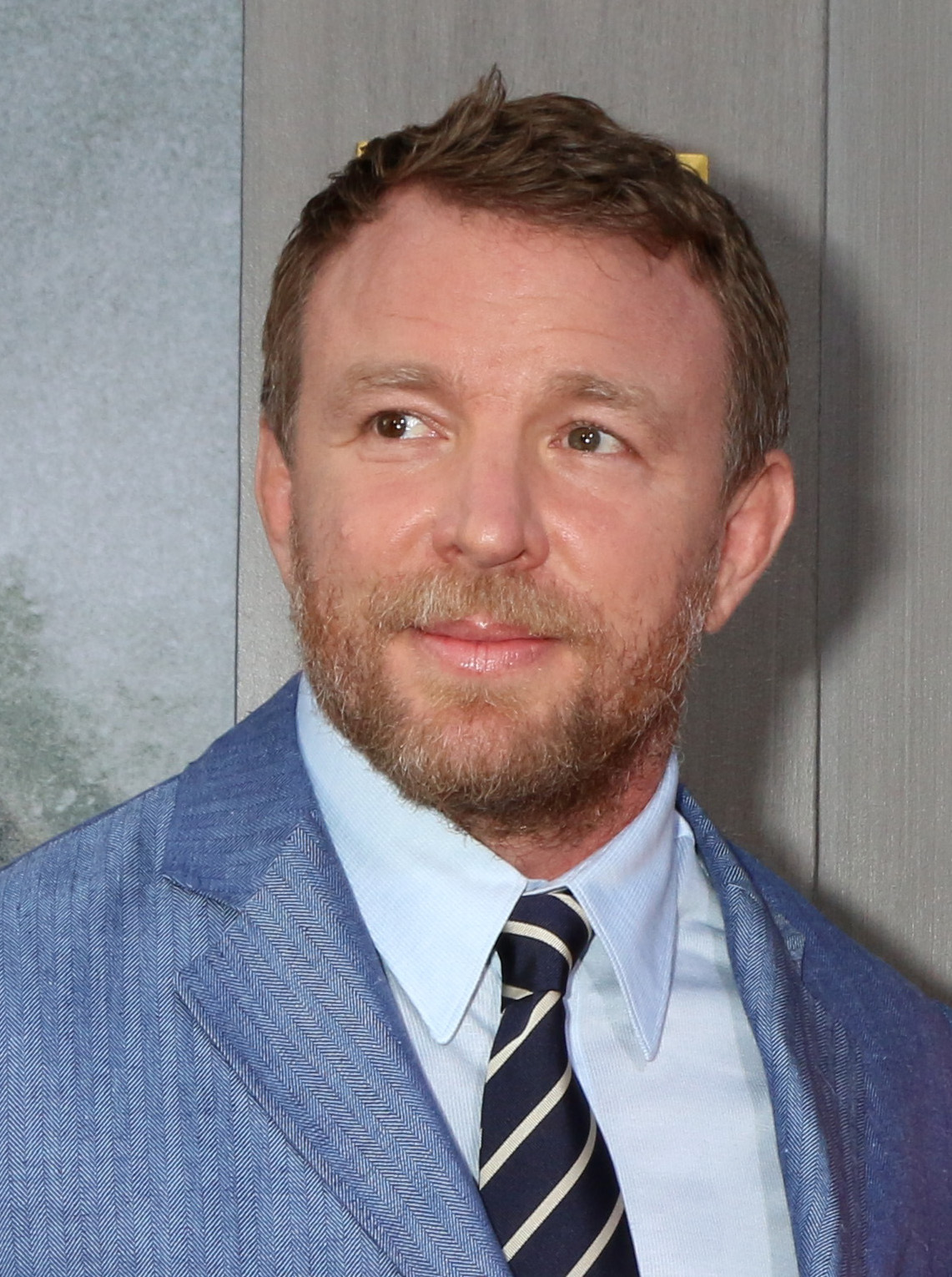
The music video was directed by Madonna's then-husband Guy Ritchie (pictured in 2017).

In February 2001, English filmmaker Guy Ritchie, Madonna's then husband, said that they were planning to work together on her new music video; "creatively, we like the same sort of things, so it just makes sense". One month later, Madonna revealed to Ingrid Sischy that the video would be for "What It Feels Like for a Girl", which she found "ironic because [Ritchie]'s such a macho man, and his movies are so testosterone-driven, but I asked him a long time ago what song on the album he responded to the most, and that's the one". Filming took place in Los Angeles, including on the Olympic Boulevard. According to Madonna she portrayed a "nihilistic pissed-off chick" in the clip, doing things that girls are generally recommended against. The video did not feature the original version of the song but the Above & Beyond remix since the singer "wanted a matching visual to it and an edgy dance mix".

The clip starts with the singer in a motel room getting ready to go out; her hair is straight, chin length and parted down the middle. She then hot-wires a yellow 1978 Chevrolet Camaro from the parking lot, with the license plates reading "Pussy" and "Cat" on the front and back, before driving to the "Ol Kuntz Guest Home" to pick up a semi-catatonic elderly woman. At a traffic light, they stop next to a car with three young men, one of whom blows her a kiss, which prompts Madonna to spin her car around and crash into them. She parks at an ATM, tasers a man and steals his money, and later gives it to a waitress at a burger place, watched by two policemen. The singer drives alongside and scratches their police car and then squirts water in their faces from a fake pistol before driving backwards into their car, triggering their air bags. She then mows down a pack of street hockey players before stealing a red 1979 Pontiac Trans Am from a gas station while a man fills its tank, spilling gasoline all over the pavement. Madonna then throws a lighter out of the window causing an explosion, all while still accompanied by the old woman. The final shot depicts her slamming the stolen car head-on into a telephone pole in an apparent act of murder–suicide.

=== Release and banning ===
Still from the music video, depicting Madonna aiming a water gun at a cop. Next to her is the elderly woman she picks up from the "Ol Kuntz Guest Home".

Upon release, the video was criticized for its violent content. Music channels MTV and VH1 said that it would not be added to their regular US rotation and would air it just once, during a news segment, before being completely banned.

Due to the excessive violence where Madonna's character went on multiple killing sprees, "What It Feels Like for a Girl" became Madonna's fourth music video to be banned by TV channels (and her third banned by MTV), following "Like a Prayer" (1989) due to blasphemy, "Justify My Love" (1990) and "Erotica" (1992) for nudity and bisexuality. "What It Feels Like for a Girl" aired on March 20, 2001, at 11:30 pm, following an introduction by MTV News anchor Kurt Loder. Liz Rosenberg, Madonna's publicist, released a statement urging the channels "to make a very strong commitment to playing this video [...] there are many other possibilities that we can explore but our first choice has always been for VH1 and MTV to play [the video], and more than once". In 2002, the video was aired in its entirety on MTV2 as part of a special countdown of the year's most controversial videos.

Three days later, the clip was shown several times on Oxygen as part of its "Daily Remix" music series. A spokeswoman for Oxygen said that the decision to air the video multiple times was because "our demographic is of 18–49 year old women [...] older than MTV's". Canadian music channel MuchMusic followed and aired the video several times throughout the day and night. Norm Schoenfield, US VP of programming for MuchMusic, released a statement saying "[the video] is no more or less violent than what kids see on TV everyday. We weren't offended by it, and treating it just like any other Madonna video. Just because MTV isn't playing it, doesn't mean we can't". Schoenfield also criticized the decision of releasing an advisory warning alongside the video because "it's the artist's responsibility to do that". Nonetheless, other Canadian networks aired it only after 9 pm accompanied by a warning. There were also talks of airing the video on HBO but it never happened.

Following the controversy with MTV, Warner Bros. Records signed a deal with AOL to air the video online on its music forums. "Our job as a record company is to get exposure for the video, So when the label couldn't get Viacom to commit to showing the video, it started talking to other outlets", explained Rosenberg. On April 24, 2001, the video was released as a DVD single with the disc having linear PCM sound quality. It debuted on Billboard's Top Music Video sales chart at number two with 6,200 copies sold, the highest sum for a DVD single since Madonna's clip for "Music", which had sold 4,200 copies in September 2000. The clip was later included on Madonna's 2009 compilation, Celebration: The Video Collection. Regarding the violent content, Madonna said that her intention was to "make people ask questions and open dialogues". Instead of banning the music video, Madonna's publicist Liz Rosenberg called for an open conversation for why Madonna's character went out of control. Rosenberg explained to New York Daily News that the clip told the story of a woman who had probably been abused, and called it a "kind of an anti-violence film. I can't imagine anyone would want to duplicate it". The apparent suicide at the end had references from Greek mythology, according to Ritchie.

=== Reception and analysis ===
David Bianculli from the New York Daily News felt that "Madonna has always kept her videos and images at least as fresh as her music. 'What It Feels Like for a Girl', though, is a bad attempt to chase attention by promising controversy". Similarly, Billboard's Carla Hay concluded that the video did not live up to its hype. George Lang from The Oklahoman, called it as the singer's worst clip and criticized Ritchie's directing abilities; "he has great visual sense, but his work often is lacking depth. Both his asset and his debit were in ample evidence in [the video]". Entertainment Weekly's Nicholas Fonseca gave the video a rating of C and opined that "Thelma and Louise it ain't. In fact, little girls can probably find more empowerment copying Britney Spears' provocative chair dance from her 'Stronger' video". But he criticized MTV's decision to ban the clip when they aired much more violent videos on the channel. Eden Miller from PopMatters echoed this sentiment, adding that MTV aired videos such as Eminem's "Stan", in which the main character drives his car off a bridge with his pregnant girlfriend tied up in the trunk, or Robbie Williams' "Rock DJ", in which the singer strips his skin off in graphic detail. Critics argued the gender double standards where violent music videos by male singers are largely tolerated by TV networks. Miller relegated the banning of Madonna's music video was because "the idea of a woman taking her aggression out on men is something even an edgy TV network like MTV was unable to accept. That's what is so disturbing. And that really is what it feels like for a girl".

Writing for the San Francisco Chronicle, Neva Chonin accused the video for being a marketing ploy and believed that the singer knew it would result in controversy and drive sales amidst the publicity. Nonetheless, she praised it for being a follow-up to Madonna's aesthetics and changing of her looks from her early career. Chonin realized that by making the violent video, Madonna proved the song's concept further by making a girl behave violently in place of a boy. Louis Virtel from The Backlot ranked it as the singer's 12th greatest video, calling it "the ultimate (read: solely tolerable) Madonna/Guy Ritchie collaboration [...] She's both chilling and totally confident. It's her most frightening performance in a music video, and when she plows that car into a group of strangers, her stoic response makes for her greatest video moment of the 2000s".

Andrew Morton opined that the video was "entirely consistent with the themes [Madonna] has been exploring for the last twenty years, namely the relationship between the sexes, the ambiguity of gender, and the unresolved conflict, for women in a patriarchal society of being fully female and sexual while exercising control over their lives". According to Santiago Fouz-Hernández and Freya Jarman-Ivens, authors of Madonna's Drowned Worlds, the video represented the female fantasy of behaving like a "bad boy" and doing things associated with men. They pointed out the scene in which Madonna winks at three men at a traffic light just before crashing their car, as they felt that on this particular shot she was "turning the tables of violence back on the men for whom such behavior is considered normal and putting them on the receiving end of violence, a position usually reserved for women". They noticed that unlike previous Madonna videos which were banned for religious themes or sexuality, MTV found violence as an offence. Even using the remix in the clip changed the song's feminine and bittersweet nature to something faster and harder, adjectives usually reserved for boys. The authors concluded that as always, Madonna inverted the traditional roles and characterization of male and female in the clip.

== Live performances and cover version ==
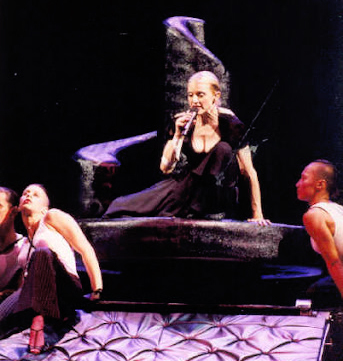
Madonna performing "Lo Que Siente la Mujer", the Spanish version of "What It Feels Like for a Girl", on 2001's Drowned World Tour

"What It Feels Like for a Girl" was performed on the promotional concerts for Music in November 2000 at New York City's Roseland Ballroom and at London's Brixton Academy. On New York, Madonna dedicated the song to singer Britney Spears, while wearing a tank top with Spears' name printed on it. For the London performance, she wore a different top imprinted with the names of son Rocco and daughter Lourdes. Around 3,000 fans attended the concert in London, which was streamed over the internet. More than nine million people watched the concert according to Nicky Price, a representative for Microsoft's MSN, the webcast's producer. It became the most-viewed webcast of all time, beating Paul McCartney's performance of "50s rock and roll classics" at Liverpool's The Cavern Club in December 1999, which was viewed by an audience of about three million.

For the Drowned World Tour of 2001, a remix of the track was used as a video interlude. Dancers wearing anime and manga inspired costumes swung from wires in a Japanese-inspired sequence as the backdrops featured scenes of a naked girl being pursued, trapped and sexually abused. The clips were taken from Satoshi Kon's 1997 film Perfect Blue interspersed with footage of the hentai anime Urotsukidōji. Writing for MTV News, Rob Mancini opined that the interlude video "upped the [show's] grim factor further". On that same tour, Madonna performed the Spanish version of the song, "Lo Que Siente La Mujer", atop a rotating black leather podium, dressed in black trousers and a backless black blouse. The female dancers were decked in masculine attires while the male dancers wore long wigs and corsets. Academic Georges Claude Guilbert, author of Madonna As Postmodern Myth, praised the performance for its "gender-bending and further sense of ambiguity" while Sal Cinquemani from Slant Magazine found it to be "anticlimactic". The performance on August 26, 2001, at The Palace of Auburn Hills, outside of Madonna's hometown of Detroit was recorded and released in the live video album, Drowned World Tour 2001.

In 2010, "What It Feels Like for a Girl" was featured in an episode of American television series Glee, called "The Power of Madonna". In the episode it was performed by actors Cory Monteith, Kevin McHale, Chris Colfer, Mark Salling, Harry Shum Jr. and Matthew Morrison. The song was released as digital download to the iTunes Store, and was also included on the soundtrack EP, Glee: The Music, The Power of Madonna. It charted at number 125 on the UK Singles Chart. In his review of the soundtrack, Fraser McAlpine from BBC News felt that "the decision to get all the boys to sing 'What It Feels Like for a Girl' is inspired, and represents a genuinely powerful musical moment that doesn't need the television show's plot to make it fly".

== Formats and track listings ==
- Canadian, Japanese and US CD maxi-single
1. "What It Feels Like for a Girl" (Paul Oakenfold Perfecto Mix) – 7:18
2. "What It Feels Like for a Girl" (Richard Vission Velvet Masta Mix) – 8:08
3. "What It Feels Like for a Girl" (Calderone & Quayle Dark Side Mix) – 6:42
4. "What It Feels Like for a Girl" (Tracy Young Club Mix) – 8:54
5. "What It Feels Like for a Girl" (Above & Beyond 12" Club Mix) – 7:27
6. "What It Feels Like for a Girl" (Tracy Young Cool Out Radio Mix) – 4:45
7. "What It Feels Like for a Girl" (Richard Vission Velvet Masta Edit) – 3:39
8. "What It Feels Like for a Girl" (Above & Beyond Club Radio Edit) – 3:45
9. "Lo Que Siente La Mujer" – 4:43
- US 2x12" vinyl
1. "What It Feels Like for a Girl" (Paul Oakenfold Perfecto Mix) – 7:18
2. "What It Feels Like for a Girl" (Richard Vission Velvet Masta Mix) – 8:08
3. "What It Feels Like for a Girl" (Above & Beyond 12" Club Mix) – 7:27
4. "What It Feels Like for a Girl" (Richard Vission Velvet Masta Edit) – 3:39
5. "What It Feels Like for a Girl" (Calderone & Quayle Dark Side Mix) – 6:42
6. "What It Feels Like for a Girl" (Tracy Young Cool Out Radio Mix) – 4:45
7. "What It Feels Like for a Girl" (Above & Beyond Club Radio Edit) – 3:45
8. "What It Feels Like for a Girl" (Tracy Young Club Mix) – 8:54
- Benelux & French 2-track CD single; UK cassette single
1. "What It Feels Like for a Girl" (Album Version) – 4:43
2. "What It Feels Like for a Girl" (Above & Beyond Club Radio Edit) - 3:45
- European CD maxi-single
1. "What It Feels Like for a Girl" (Album Version) – 4:43
2. "What It Feels Like for a Girl" (Above & Beyond 12" Club Mix) – 7:27
3. "What It Feels Like for a Girl" (Paul Oakenfold Perfecto Mix) – 7:18
4. "What It Feels Like for a Girl" (Richard Vission Velvet Masta Mix) – 8:08
- European and UK CD maxi-single 1
1. "What It Feels Like for a Girl" (Album Version) – 4:43
2. "What It Feels Like for a Girl" (Paul Oakenfold Perfecto Mix) – 7:18
3. "What It Feels Like for a Girl" (Above & Beyond 12" Club Mix) – 7:27
- European and UK CD maxi-single 2
1. "What It Feels Like for a Girl" (Radio Edit) – 4:00
2. "What It Feels Like for a Girl" (Tracy Young Cool Out Radio Edit) – 4:45
3. "What It Feels Like for a Girl" (Calderone & Quayle Dark Side Mix) – 6:42
4. "What It Feels Like for a Girl" (Richard Vission Velvet Masta Edit) – 3:39
- European and UK 12-inch vinyl
1. "What It Feels Like for a Girl" (Above & Beyond 12" Club Mix) – 7:27
2. "What It Feels Like for a Girl" (Paul Oakenfold Perfecto Mix) – 7:18
- European 12-inch vinyl 2
1. "What It Feels Like for a Girl" (Calderone & Quayle Dark Side Mix) – 6:42
2. "What It Feels Like for a Girl" (Tracy Young Cool Out Radio Mix) – 4:45
3. "What It Feels Like for a Girl" (Richard Vission Velvet Masta Mix) – 8:08
- Australian CD maxi-single 1
1. "What It Feels Like for a Girl" (Album Version) - 4:43
2. "What It Feels Like for a Girl" (Calderone & Quayle Dark Side Mix) – 6:42
3. "What It Feels Like for a Girl" (Above & Beyond 12" Club Mix) – 7:27
4. "What It Feels Like for a Girl" (Paul Oakenfold Perfecto Mix) – 7:18
5. "What It Feels Like for a Girl" (Richard Vission Velvet Masta Mix) – 8:08
- Australian CD maxi-single 2
1. "What It Feels Like for a Girl" (Above & Beyond Club Radio Edit) – 3:45
2. "Lo Que Siente La Mujer" – 4:43
3. "What It Feels Like for a Girl" (Tracy Young Cool Out Radio Mix) – 4:45
4. "What It Feels Like for a Girl" (Richard Vission Velvet Masta Edit) – 3:39
5. "What It Feels Like for a Girl" (Tracy Young Club Mix) – 8:54
- Japanese CD maxi-single
1. "What It Feels Like for a Girl" (Radio Edit) – 4:00
2. "What It Feels Like for a Girl" (Tracy Young Cool Out Radio Mix) – 4:45
3. "What It Feels Like for a Girl" (Calderone & Quayle Dark Side Mix) – 6:42
4. "What It Feels Like for a Girl" (Tracy Young Club Mix) – 8:54
- Asian CD maxi-single
1. "What It Feels Like for a Girl" (Radio Edit) – 4:00
2. "What It Feels Like for a Girl" (Tracy Young Cool Out Radio Mix) – 4:46
3. "What It Feels Like for a Girl" (Tracy Young Club Mix) – 8:56
4. "What It Feels Like for a Girl" (Richard Vission Velvet Masta Mix) – 8:08
5. "What It Feels Like for a Girl" (Paul Oakenfold Perfecto Mix) – 7:18
6. "What It Feels Like for a Girl" (Calderone & Quayle Dark Side Mix) – 6:42
7. "What It Feels Like for a Girl" (Above & Beyond 12" Club Mix) – 7:27
- European VHS single and US DVD single
1. "What It Feels Like for a Girl" (Video) – 5:00
- Australian, European and Japanese DVD single
1. "What It Feels Like for a Girl" (Video) – 5:00
2. "What It Feels Like for a Girl" (Calderone & Quayle Dark Side Mix) – 6:42
3. "What It Feels Like for a Girl" (Richard Vission Velvet Masta Mix) – 8:08
- Digital single (2021)
1. "What It Feels Like for a Girl" (Radio Edit) – 4:03
2. "What It Feels Like for a Girl" (Paul Oakenfold Perfecto Mix) – 7:19
3. "What It Feels Like for a Girl" (Richard Vission Velvet Masta Mix) – 8:06
4. "What It Feels Like for a Girl" (Calderone & Quayle Dark Side Mix) – 6:43
5. "What It Feels Like for a Girl" (Tracy Young Club Mix) – 8:56
6. "What It Feels Like for a Girl" (Above & Beyond 12" Club) – 7:25
7. "What It Feels Like for a Girl" (Tracy Young Cool Out Radio Mix) – 4:46
8. "What It Feels Like for a Girl" (Richard Vission Velvet Masta Edit) – 3:39
9. "What It Feels Like for a Girl" (Above & Beyond Club Radio Edit) – 3:44
10. "What It Feels Like for a Girl" (George Best Saturday Night Mix) – 5:23
11. "What It Feels Like for a Girl" (That Kid Chris Caligula 2001 Mix) – 9:51
12. "Lo Que Siente la Mujer" – 4:43

== Credits and personnel ==
Credits adapted from liner notes of 12-inch single.

=== Management ===
- Recorded at Sarm West Studios, Notting Hill, London
- Mixed at Olympic Studios, London
- Mastered at Metropolis Studios, London
- Webo Girl Publishing, Inc., Warner Bros. Music Corp (ASCAP), 1000 Lights Music Ltd, Warner-Tamerlane Publishing Corp. (BMI)

=== Personnel ===
- Madonna – vocals, songwriter, production
- Guy Sigsworth – songwriter, production, guitar, keyboards, programming
- Mark "Spike" Stent – production, mixing, mastering
- David Torn – songwriter
- Kevin Reagan – art direction, design
- Matthew Lindauer – design
- Ray Janos – lacquer cut
- Jean-Baptiste Mondino – photography
- Caresse Henry – management

== Charts ==
=== Weekly charts ===
Weekly chart performance for "What It Feels Like for a Girl" by Madonna
Chart (2001)	Peak position
Argentina (CAPIF)	3
Australia (ARIA)	6
Australian Dance (ARIA)	1
Austria (Ö3 Austria Top 40)	26
Belgium (Ultratop 50 Flanders)	23
Belgium (Ultratop 50 Wallonia)	14
Canada (Nielsen SoundScan)	2
Canada CHR (Nielsen BDS)	12
Croatia (HRT)	4
Denmark (Tracklisten)	9
Europe (European Hot 100 Singles)	8
Finland (Suomen virallinen lista)	4
France (SNEP)	40
Germany (GfK)	16
Greece (IFPI)	4
Hungary (Mahasz)	9
Iceland (Íslenski listinn)	3
Ireland (IRMA)	18
Italy (FIMI)	2
Netherlands (Dutch Top 40)	7
Netherlands (Single Top 100)	16
New Zealand (Recorded Music NZ)	15
Norway (VG-lista)	14
Portugal (AFP)	3
Romania (Romanian Top 100)	3
Scottish Singles Sales (Official Charts)	7
Spain (Promusicae)	1
Sweden (Sverigetopplistan)	22
Switzerland (Schweizer Hitparade)	11
UK Singles (Official Charts)	7
UK Music Videos (Official Charts)	1
US Billboard Hot 100	23
US Adult Contemporary (Billboard)	27
US Adult Pop Airplay (Billboard)	24
US Dance Club Songs (Billboard)	1
US Dance Singles Sales (Billboard)	1
US Pop Airplay (Billboard)	14
US Music Video Sales (Billboard)	2

Chart (2021)	Peak position
Hungary (Single Top 40)	20

=== Year-end charts ===
Year-end chart performance for "What It Feels Like for a Girl"
Chart (2001)	Position
Australia (ARIA)	84
Australian Dance (ARIA)	14
Belgium Dance (Ultratop Flanders)	97
Brazil (Crowley)	51
Canada (Nielsen SoundScan)	9
Europe (European Radio Top 100)	13
Netherlands (Dutch Top 40)	89
Romania (Romanian Top 100)	43
UK Singles (OCC)	147
US Dance Club Play (Billboard)	24
US Hot Singles Sales (Billboard)	71

Chart (2002)	Position
Canada (Nielsen SoundScan)	66
US Maxi-Singles Sales (Billboard)	11

== Certifications ==
Certifications and sales for "What It Feels Like for a Girl"
Region	Certification	Certified units/sales
Australia (ARIA)	Gold	35,000^{^}
France	—	16,390
United Kingdom	—	86,771 (Note: UK sales as of August 2008.)
United States	—	17,000 (Note: US sales for a remix version as of May 2001.)
^{^} Shipments figures based on certification alone.

== Release history ==
Release dates and formats for "What It Feels Like for a Girl"
Region	Date	Format(s)	Label(s)	Ref.
United Kingdom	April 9, 2001	12-inch vinyl; cassette; maxi CD (Note: In Australia, France, and the UK, "What It Feels Like for a Girl" was made available in two maxi CD variants.)	Maverick	
France	April 17, 2001	12-inch vinyl; maxi CD	Maverick	
Germany	April 17, 2001	Maxi CD	Warner Music	
Australia	April 23, 2001	Maxi CD	Warner Music	
Germany	April 24, 2001	DVD	Warner Music	
United States	April 24, 2001	DVD	Warner Reprise Video	
Japan	April 25, 2001	Maxi CD	Warner Music	
United States	May 1, 2001	12-inch vinyl; maxi CD	Maverick; Warner Bros.	
France	May 14, 2001	DVD	Maverick	
France	May 29, 2001	CD	Maverick	
Australia	June 4, 2001	DVD	Warner Music	
Japan	June 20, 2001	DVD	Warner Music	

== See also ==
- List of number-one singles of 2001 (Spain)
- List of number-one dance singles of 2001 (Australia)
- List of number-one dance singles of 2001 (U.S.)
