= Don't Tell Me (Madonna song) =

2000 single by Madonna

Single by Madonna

from the album Music
- Released: November 13, 2000
- Studio: Sarm West (London)
- Genre: Electronica; folktronica; country rock; trip hop
- Length: 4:40 (album version); 4:10 (radio edit)
- Label: Maverick; Warner Bros.
- Songwriters: Madonna; Mirwais Ahmadzaï; Joe Henry
- Producers: Madonna; Mirwais Ahmadzaï

Madonna singles chronology
"Music" (2000)	"Don't Tell Me" (2000)	"What It Feels Like for a Girl" (2001)

Music video
- "Don't Tell Me" on YouTube

"Don't Tell Me" is a song recorded by American singer Madonna for her eighth studio album Music (2000). Madonna co-wrote and co-produced the track with Mirwais Ahmadzaï, with additional writing from her brother-in-law, Joe Henry. Henry originally conceived it as a tango-styled torch song called "Stop"; the demo was later sent to Madonna, who then proceeded to change its musical composition, turning it into a country-dance song. Lyrically, Madonna asks her lover not to control her. "Don't Tell Me" was released as the second single from Music on November 13, 2000, by Maverick Records and Warner Bros. Records.

"Don't Tell Me" received positive reviews from music critics, who cited the song as one of the album's standouts and praised Madonna's vocals. It was also compared to the work of singer Sheryl Crow. The song attained commercial success, reaching the top of the record charts in Canada, Italy and New Zealand, as well as the top five in several regions. It also became Europe's biggest radio hit of 2001. In the United States, "Don't Tell Me" reached number four on the Billboard Hot 100, tying her with the Beatles as the artist with the second-most top-ten singles in the Hot 100 history.

The music video was directed by Jean-Baptiste Mondino and features Madonna as a cowgirl walking down an automated treadmill in front of a projection screen, with cowboys dancing and straddling horses in the backdrop. The clip received two nominations at the 2001 MTV Video Music Awards, while also being nominated for a Grammy Award. The song was included in three of Madonna's concert tours: Drowned World (2001), Re-Invention (2004), and Celebration (2023–2024). In 2014, Madonna appeared on Miley Cyrus' MTV Unplugged special and performed "Don't Tell Me" in a mashup with Cyrus' 2013 song "We Can't Stop". Two years later, she performed the song on her Madonna: Tears of a Clown show, in Melbourne and Miami.

== Background and release ==
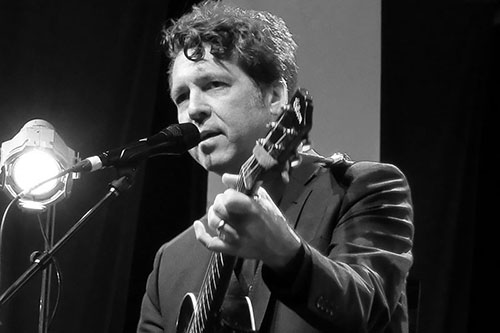
"Don't Tell Me" was based on the demo "Stop", written by Joe Henry, Madonna's brother-in-law.

After the critical and commercial success of her seventh studio album, Ray of Light (1998), Madonna had intended to embark on a concert tour in late 1999, but due to the delay of her film, The Next Best Thing (2000), the tour was cancelled. The singer also became pregnant with her son Rocco, from her relationship with director Guy Ritchie. Wanting to distract herself from the media frenzy, Madonna concentrated on the development of her eighth studio album, Music. She worked with French DJ and producer Mirwais Ahmadzaï on the album, describing it as consisting of "Funky, electronic music blended with futuristic folk. Lots of jangly guitars and moody melancholic lines".

Following the success of the lead single, "Music", "Don't Tell Me" was released as the second single from the album on November 21, 2000, by Maverick Records. A number of remixes for the song were created by Thunderpuss, Richard "Humpty" Vission and Tracy Young. Warner Bros. Records released various renditions on CD, cassette, maxi, 7-inch and 12-inch singles. The Thunderpuss Club Mix had a more house-inspired sound, with spiraling synth pads and keyboard effects. The filtered beats and tweaked keyboard riffs of Humpty Vission's Radio Mix gave Madonna's voice an "underwater" effect, while Young's remix featured a violin breakdown and sonic elements that reminisce Blondie's 1979 hit "Heart of Glass". AllMusic's Jose F. Promis praised the remixes for "transform(ing) the country-infused track into an awesome dance extravaganza".

== Recording and composition ==
Madonna co-wrote and co-produced "Don't Tell Me" with Ahmadzaï, and her brother-in-law Joe Henry, who is credited as an additional songwriter. Henry had written a tango-styled song titled "Stop", which featured jazz saxophone player Ornette Coleman and Henry singing in "Tom Waits-inspired" vocals; it was eventually included on the latter's eighth studio album, Scar (2001). After Henry played the demo for "Stop" to his wife, Madonna's sister Melanie, she sent the track to Madonna. The singer liked the demo and was drawn to the song's lyrics, its "sentiment of defiance, the attitude of it", but did not prefer its musical tone, since it was not in-line with the compositions for Music. Madonna worked with Ahmadzaï and changed the original string arrangement into a stop-time, acoustic guitar and keyboard composition. She recorded it at Ahmadzaï's studio, accompanied by a Martin D-28 guitar to which Ahmadzaï added a stutter effect. Madonna preferred the sound effect over the final melody. Ahmadzaï also played the acoustic guitar and keyboards on the track. Mark "Spike" Stent mixed the song and Michel Colombier played the strings.

"Don't Tell Me"
A 28-sample of "Don't Tell Me" which shows the song's stop/start guitar sound, as well as the guitar licks with Madonna singing the unusual lyrics.

It's probably the last thing I've written with regard to her [...] It's a line I just don't cross. Musically it's never seemed appropriate... I thought the song was a complete throwaway. I had just moved and set up a studio in the guesthouse of my home and was looking to record anything to make sure my things were working. I needed something to record, so I wrote that song in about 25 minutes just to give myself something to do. I was a little embarrassed by it, it starts off a little spoon-in-June and takes a cryptic turn at the end.

— Joe Henry talking to NPR about how he came to write the song.

According to the sheet music published by Musicnotes.com, "Don't Tell Me" is set in the time signature of common time, with a moderate tempo of 100 beats per minute. It is composed in the key of D major with the singer's vocals ranging from the lower octave of G_{3} to the higher note of A♭_{4}. The song follows a basic sequence of D–Am–C–G as its chord progression. Ben Greenbank from Sputnikmusic described the track as a "country meets dance" song with trip hop beats, accompanied by acoustic guitar riffs. Chuck Arnold of Billboard described "Don't Tell Me" as a "twangy trip-hop" track. While, Billboard 's Jason Lipshutz said its production "served as an act of twangy defiance — with clipped vocals, guitar loops, strings and a mainstream take on folktronica". The song begins with a "plucked" guitar riff in a jagged stop/start beat, with the arpeggios reminiscent of country music. Every fourth beat is followed by a small silence that eventually builds into the chorus.

Rikky Rooksby, author of The Complete Guide to the Music of Madonna, described the track as an "electronica meets country rock" song based on a single four-chord sequence, disguised by the mixing. He found that Madonna's expressive lead vocals were double tracked. The strings appeared towards the end with the looping sounds continuing and ultimately fading. According to author Carol Vernallis, the contradictory guitar stops interspersed with the digital electronic sounds made the song sound "authentic" in its portrayal of the country-western genre of music. When asked about the differences between his demo and Madonna's song, Henry pointed out that it was the groove which was important. Lyrically, Madonna urges her lover in the song to stop controlling her actions and feelings; she compares the lyrics to the work of Frank Sinatra. She conjures up unnatural imagery through the lyrics by singing "Tell the bed not to lay / Like the open mouth of a grave, yeah / Not to stare up at me / Like a calf down on its knees".

== Critical response ==
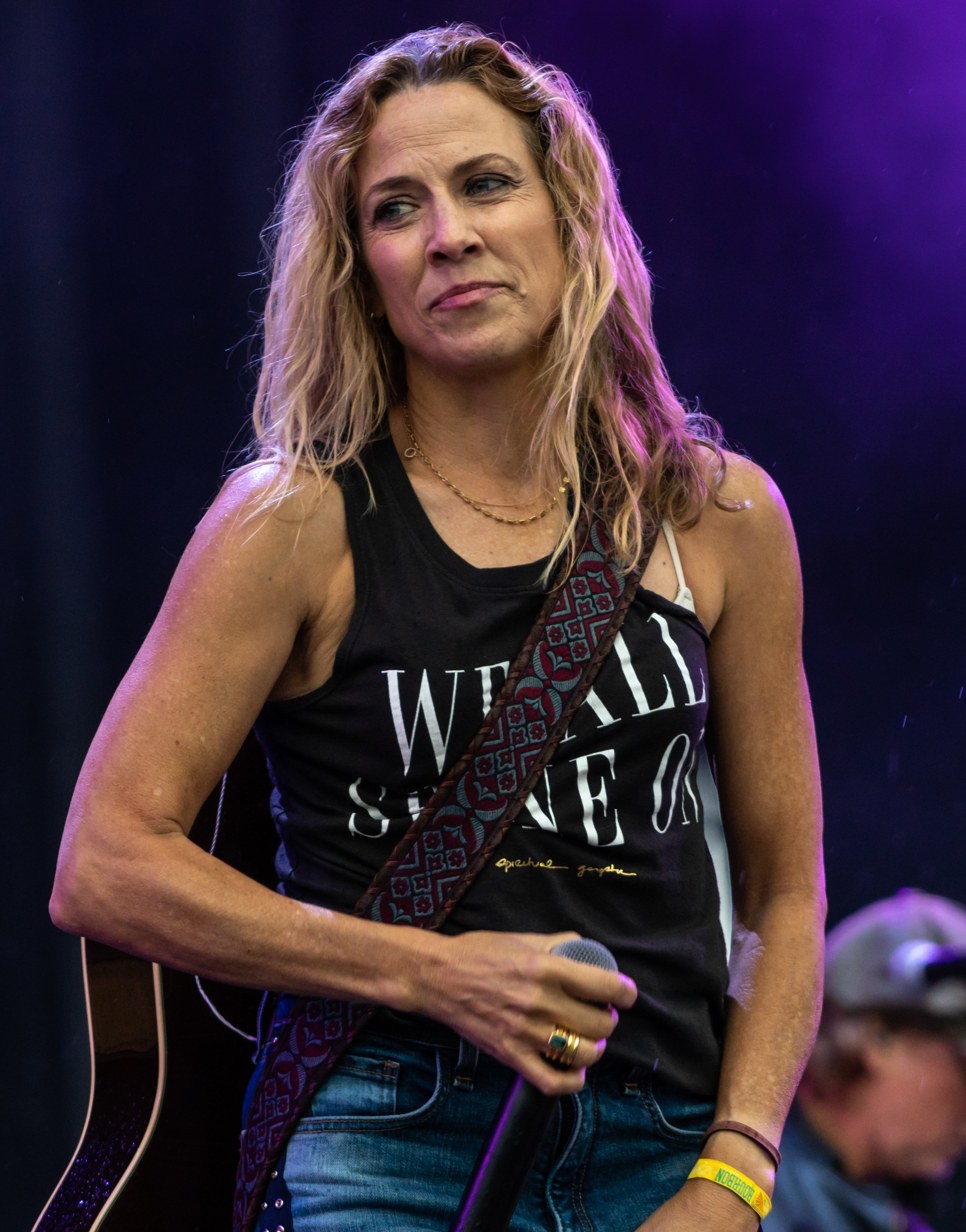
"Don't Tell Me" was compared to the work of American singer Sheryl Crow (pictured).

AllMusic's Stephen Thomas Erlewine gave a positive review of "Don't Tell Me", describing it as an "intricate, sensual, folk-psych stunner". Jim Farber from Daily News felt that "[the song] crosses up-to-date electronica with rootsy American blues via a guitar hook that sounds something like Lynyrd Skynyrd's 'Sweet Home Alabama'". He also believed that the imagery conjured up in the song is predominantly American. A reviewer for NME considered "Don't Tell Me" an "alt-alt-country, hacked-up acoustic guitar over knife-sharp beats track", comparing Madonna to Sheryl Crow. Danny Eccleston from Q, also saw similarities to Crow, calling the track "Music's closest cousin to the sonic landscapes of Ray of Light", while also pointing out its "masterful ending – as a rhythm of insectoid whirrs and bendy ARP-style 'wowp!'s join the guitar while Colombier's strings ape the peal of church bells". Digital Spy's Justin Harp felt that "the comparisons [to Sheryl Crow] actually did a disservice to a track that stands out as particularly unique in Madonna's massive catalogue of hits". Louis Virtel, from The Backlot, placed "Don't Tell Me" at number 25 of his list "The 100 Greatest Madonna Songs"; he praised the singer for "invoking some tried-and-true country music imagery" and called it an "unmistakable radio moment of the early 2000s".

Shaad D'Souza of Pitchfork described it as "the album’s most indelible song and one of Madonna’s best-ever singles". Samuel R. Murrian from Parade wrote that "Madonna’s defiant, rebellious personality that we love is on full-blast in this extremely clever and infectious song". While ranking Madonna's singles in honor of her 60th birthday, Jude Rogers from The Guardian placed the track at number 32, calling it "brilliantly strange" and praising its catchiness. Jon O'Brien from Paste magazine complimented the track's production, and believed it to be an "immediate standout" on the album. The mix of the guitar riffs, the fractured beats and Colombier's string arrangement were all listed as an "elegiac finale" complementing the cowboy imagery portrayed by Madonna during the album cycle. Similar thoughts were registered by The Huffington Post's Matthew Jacobs who ranked it at number 21 of his list "The Definitive Ranking of Madonna Singles". In his review of the Music album, Sal Cinquemani from Slant Magazine felt that Madonna revealed more of her soul in the track. Cinquemani further opined that "Don't Tell Me" was perceived to be an "unlikely" follow-up to "Music", with its "atypical structure and peculiar lyrics [...] [that] made it an unlikely hit to boot. But a hit is exactly what it was [...]", awarding the track a B+.

For Medium's Richard LaBeau, "this fascinating merge of country and dance ranks high among the most unique songs of her career". Billboard's Larry Flick called "Don't Tell Me" a "thoughtful, often poetic gem" that features "one of Madonna's most soulful vocal deliveries". In August 2018, Billboard picked it as the singer's 20th greatest single; "a mix of poetically off-center lyrics. a CD-skip stutter effect and that jangly guitar riff, ["Don't Tell Me"] would’ve ended up a mess for many artists. But for Madonna, it landed her yet another top five Hot 100 hit". Author Alejandro L. Madrid felt the song had elements of Nortec music. Steven Humphrey, from The Portland Mercury, hailed it as "a freaking great song. (Perhaps the last great song of [Madonna's] career?) A stuttering combo of trip-hop and hillbilly folk, Madonna's soulful croon perfectly expresses the longing of a gal telling her beau to stop controlling how she feels". A negative review came from Cynthia Fuchs of PopMatters who wrote that the song "is another near miss, with admirable attitude but, well, laughable lyrics". Entertainment Weekly's Chuck Arnold listed "Don't Tell Me" as Madonna's 28th best single, writing that "with its acoustic guitar, country stomp, and stop-start trippiness, ['Don't Tell Me'] succeeds against the odds". From Gay Star News, Joe Morgan wrote: "Lyrics don’t make a lot of sense, but that doesn’t matter. This is unique, country-electronic pop".

== Chart performance ==
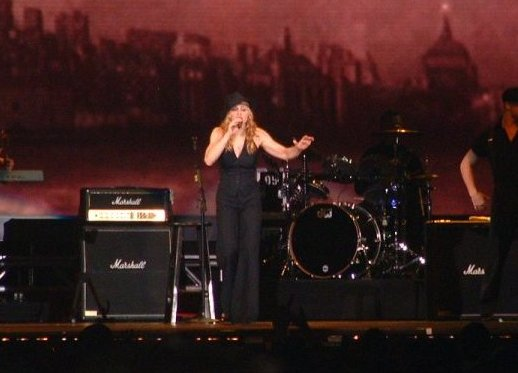
"Don't Tell Me" peaked at number 4 of the US Billboard Hot 100, tying Madonna with the Beatles as the artist with the second-most top-ten singles in the chart's history. In the image, the singer is performing the song on 2004's Re-Invention World Tour.

"Don't Tell Me" debuted at number 78 on the US Billboard Hot 100 chart, the week of December 9, 2000. Two weeks later it reached the top-40 of the chart at number 35. In February 2001, after its commercial release, the single climbed from number 16 to number four, giving Madonna her 34th top-ten single on the Hot 100. This achievement tied Madonna with the Beatles for second most top-ten singles and put her within reach of Elvis Presley's record of 36 top-ten hits. She later surpassed the record with her 2008 single "4 Minutes", thus becoming the artist with most top-ten singles in Billboard Hot 100 history. In 2015, Billboard ranked "Don't Tell Me" at number 26 on their list of "Madonna's 40 Biggest Hits" on the Hot 100.

"Don't Tell Me" was also successful on Billboard's Dance Club Songs chart, being present on the chart for 14 weeks. It outlasted "Music" and tied with "Ray of Light" (1998) and "Bedtime Story" (1995) as Madonna's longest running song on the chart at the time. The track was certified Gold by the Recording Industry Association of America (RIAA) on March 28, 2001, for shipments of 500,000 copies, becoming Madonna's 24th Gold-certified single and tying her with the Beatles for the second-most gold records in the United States.

In Canada, the song debuted at number 14 on the Canadian Singles Chart for the week of December 23, 2000 from import sales alone. It reached the first spot the week of February 17, 2001, where it remained for one week. "Don't Tell Me" became Madonna's record-breaking 19th number-one hit in the nation, ending her tie with The Beatles to make her the artist with the most number-one singles in Canadian history, a record which she continues to hold. The song was also the second number-one hit off of her Music album, following the chart-topping success of the album's title track in 2000. Music became Madonna's fourth album to produce multiple number-one hits in Canada, following True Blue (1986), Like a Prayer (1989), and Bedtime Stories (1994).

In Australia, the song debuted at number eight, and next week reached a peak of number seven on the Australian Singles Chart, staying for a total of 17 weeks. In 2002, it obtained a Platinum certification from the Australian Recording Industry Association (ARIA) for shipment of 70,000 copies of the single. The song was also successful in New Zealand, where it became Madonna's fifth and second consecutive number-one following "Music".

In the United Kingdom, "Don't Tell Me" debuted at number 65 on the UK Singles Chart on December 9, 2000. After a total of 10 weeks on the chart, it peaked at number 4 on February 10, 2001, becoming Madonna's 12th consecutive top-ten single. According to the Official Charts Company, the song has sold 185,000 copies there. In 2017, it was certified silver by the British Phonographic Industry (BPI) for equivalent sales of 200,000 copies. "Don't Tell Me" was also successful across Europe: in Italy, it peaked at number one on the FIMI Singles Chart, while reaching the top-ten in Finland, Norway, Poland, Scotland and Spain. Across Europe, the song peaked at number two on the European Hot 100 Singles chart . It also topped the European Top 50 Radio for nine consecutive weeks and eventually became the continent's number-one radio song of 2001.

== Music video ==
=== Background and synopsis ===
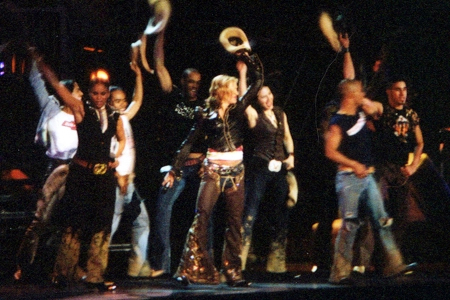
The performance of "Don't Tell Me" at the Drowned World Tour (2001) featured Madonna and her dancers dressed as cowboys and line dancing, similar to the song's music video.

The music video for "Don't Tell Me" was directed by long-time collaborator Jean-Baptiste Mondino and was filmed in Los Angeles on October 17, 2000, with Jamie King in charge of the choreography. King described the filming process: "[Mondino] really doesn't write a treatment so much. He may have an idea and Madonna and I really have lots of ideas and then I usually come up with a treatment style thing that he ends up executing and Madonna agrees to it. It's just a really great collaboration". The wardrobe was created by DSquared^{2} and longtime Madonna collaborator Arianne Phillips. In a 2016 interview with Billboard, Phillips cited "Don't Tell Me" as one of her favorite Madonna style moments, saying that working with the singer is both rewarding and challenging.

The video begins with Madonna—dressed in a blue plaid flannel shirt, dirty jeans, a large buckled belt and boots—walking on a desert highway faced towards the viewer. The camera zooms out to reveal that the highway in the background is actually a projection on a drive-in style backdrop and that Madonna is walking on a treadmill. Her walking freezes simultaneously with the song's silent dropouts. The clip then alternates between scenes of Madonna dancing by herself on the treadmill, playing with sand in a desert, and cowboys line dancing in the video backdrop. Later, the cowboys join the singer in a choreographed dance routine, with Madonna wearing a black western-style jacket, cowboy hat and suede chaps. Towards the end Madonna is seen riding a mechanical bull, while the final scene depicts a cowboy riding a Skewbald horse in slow motion, getting thrown to the ground and getting up again.

=== Reception and analysis ===
The New York Daily News' Jim Farber praised the choreography presented in the video, writing that it "lives up to the beauty of 'Open Your Heart', spiced with the zip of the peppiest new Gap ads". Steven Humphrey from The Portland Mercury, felt that the video departed from Mondino and Madonna's previous collaborations due to the following reasons: "[Madonna] is treated more like a set-piece [...] she's just there—not overtly sexual, not trying to prove any point, just there". Humphrey found references of Monidno's earlier work in the clip for "Don't Tell Me", including the "topsy-turvy projections and a placid, near-emotionless narrator" he displayed in singer Don Henley's music video for "The Boys of Summer" (1984). Digital Spy's Justin Harp felt that "the sight of Madonna wearing a cowboy hat and line dancing in the [video] still ranks as one of the iconic visuals from her four-decade career". Author Judith Periano wrote in her book Listening to the Sirens: Musical Technologies of Queer Identity from Homer to Hedwig that the video was comparable to the clip for Judy Garland's "Get Happy". Samuel R. Murrian opined that it "revolutionized cowboy chic".

Santiago Fouz-Hernández and Freya Jarman-Ivens, authors of Madonna's Drowned Worlds, questioned whether the singer's portrayal of Western culture in the video was legitimate or if it was meant to be tongue-in-cheek, also criticizing the dancing cowboys. Farber added that "by putting her cowboys on a commercial billboard, [Madonna] not only acknowledges the absurdity of her playing a rural lass, she's implicitly questioning whether there's any difference left between authenticity and fakery in a media-driven world". According to Amy Herzog, the video inverts the traditional male gaze by directing it onto the fallen cowboy at the end — the subversion being a recurrent theme in Madonna's work from her music videos of the 1980s.

During the 2001 MTV Movie Awards, hosts Kirsten Dunst and Jimmy Fallon parodied both the video and Madonna's cowgirl look. At one point, Fallon even dropped to the floor to cover himself in sand. The song "Do it With Madonna" by Australian rock band The Androids referenced the music video in the line "Have you seen her where she's wearing the cowboy hat and she's kicking the dirt?". In 2015, television show host Ellen DeGeneres re-created the video by superimposing herself as one of Madonna's cowboys. At the 10th annual Music Video Production Association Awards, which took place on May 16, 2001, the video won two awards: in the categories of Video of the year and Best direction for a female artist. It was also nominated for a Grammy Award for Best Music Video at the 44th ceremony and for Best Female Video and Best Choreography at the 2001 MTV Video Music Awards. In 2009, the video was included on Madonna's compilation, Celebration: The Video Collection.

== Live performances ==
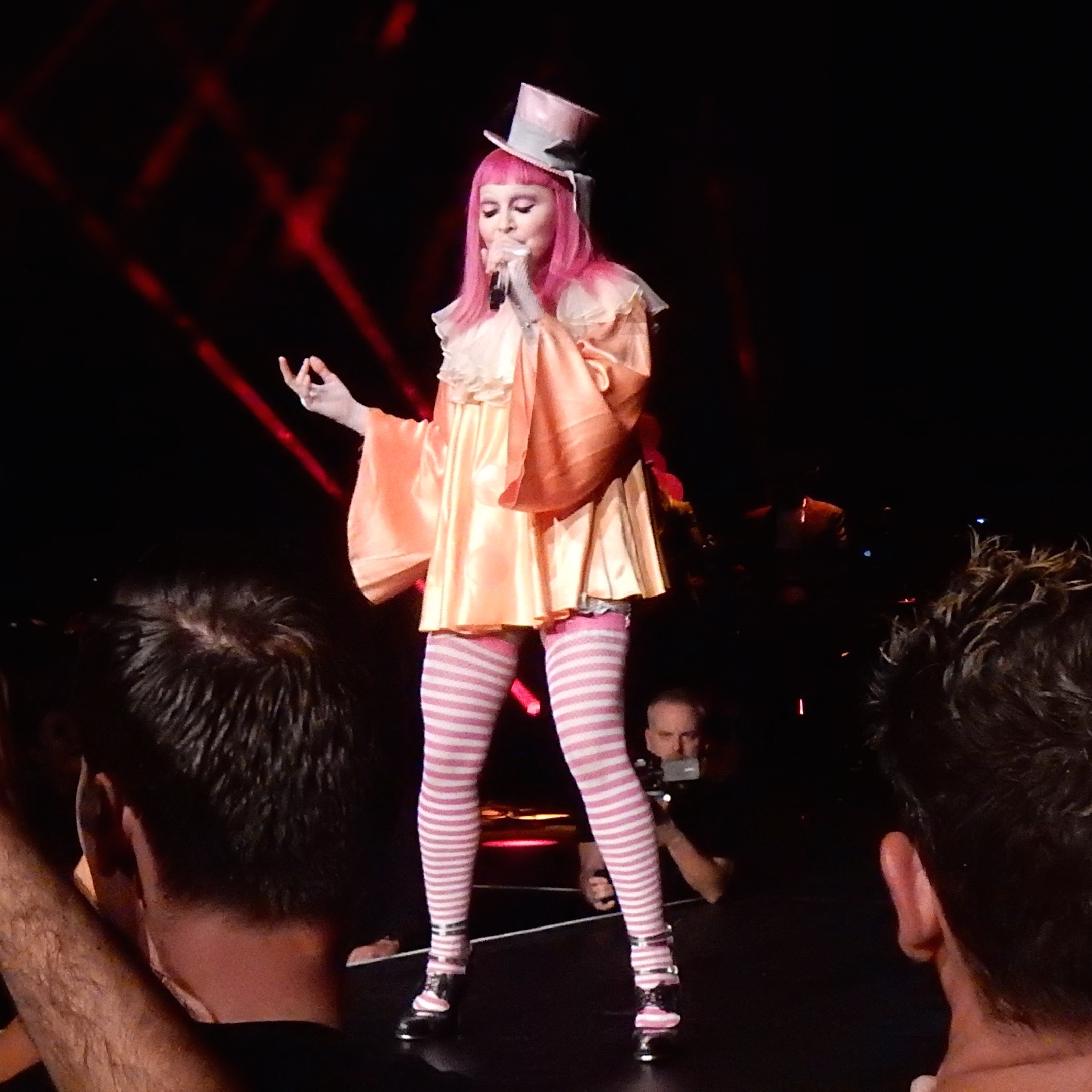
Madonna performing "Don't Tell Me" during her Tears of a Clown show in Melbourne, Australia in March 2016

On November 3, 2000, Madonna appeared on The Late Show with David Letterman, her first time on the show since her controversial appearance in 1994. She performed a slow version of "Don't Tell Me" on acoustic guitar; this marked the first time the singer played guitar in public. Dressed in a black bedazzled cowboy shirt and jeans, she was joined by Monte Pittman. Shortly afterwards, she traveled to Europe to promote Music and performed "Don't Tell Me" on German TV show Wetten, dass..?. On November 24, she appeared on British television show Top of the Pops and performed both "Don't Tell Me" and "Music". Both songs were also performed during Madonna's visit to French television program Nulle Part Ailleurs that same week, as well as on Italian show Carràmba! Che fortuna. The song was also performed on the promotional concerts for Music, on November 5, 2000, at New York City's Roseland Ballroom, and on November 29 at London's Brixton Academy. During the performance Madonna sat on a bale of hay while Ahmadzaï played guitar. Her wardrobe consisted of a black tank top with the name Britney Spears written on it, cowboy hat and boots. For the London performance, Madonna wore a different t-shirt, with the names of her son Rocco and daughter Lourdes printed on it.

On the Drowned World Tour (2001), Madonna performed "Don't Tell Me" as the second song of the Western-themed third act. Dressed as a cowgirl in a black jacket, stars and stripes blouse, a raccoon's tail as an accessory, cowboy hat and mud encrusted jeans with chaps, Madonna reenacted the song's music video with her dancers dressed as cowboys and did a line dance. Phill Gallo from Variety, was impressed with the number, pointing out that it was the tour's first to feature the singer and her dancers doing collective choreography. The performance on August 26, 2001, at The Palace of Auburn Hills, Detroit was recorded and released in the live video album, Drowned World Tour 2001. On May 9, 2003, Madonna performed "Don't Tell Me" at London's HMV Oxford Circus while promoting her ninth studio album American Life. During the Re-Invention World Tour (2004), Madonna performed a "funked-up" version of the song, which was included on the show's acoustic themed third act. She was decked in a black Stella McCartney suit with matching hat and again enacted the video's choreography with her dancers. The performance featured a French skyline as backdrop and sampled The Verve's "Bitter Sweet Symphony" (1997).

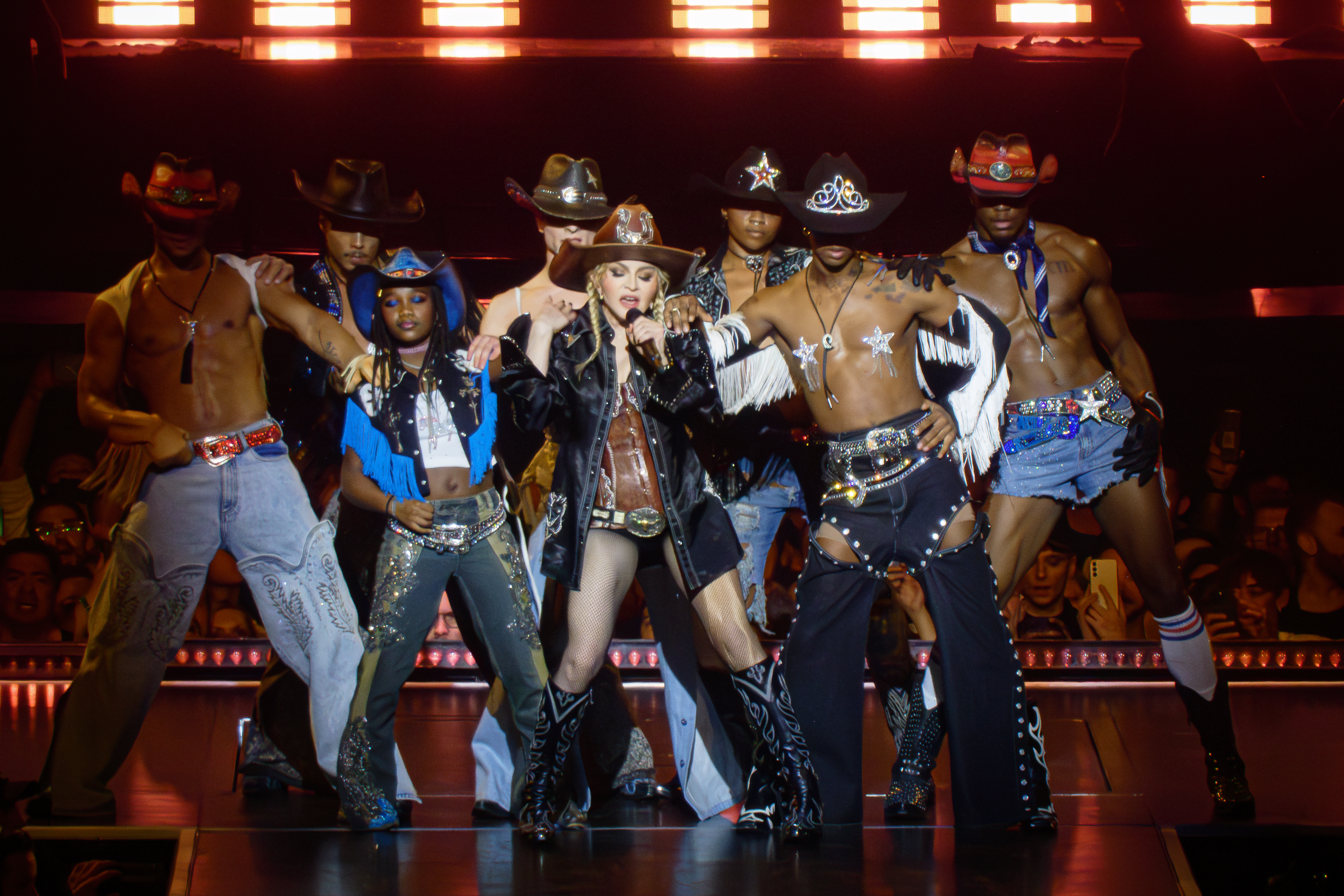
Madonna singing "Don't Tell Me" in cowboy gear during 2023-2024's the Celebration Tour.

On January 29, 2014, Madonna made a surprise appearance at singer Miley Cyrus' MTV Unplugged special, and performed a mashup of "Don't Tell Me" with Cyrus' 2013 song "We Can't Stop". Both singers were dressed in rhinestone cowboy outfits. They sang and finished each other's verses while bumping and grinding. Matthew Jacobs from The Huffington Post, wrote that "even if the vocals got a little shoddy toward the mashup's end – [Cyrus and Madonna] staged an impressive collaboration that didn't rely on the amplified production values associated with their typical performances". While on the Rebel Heart Tour (2015–2016), Madonna performed impromptu versions of "Don't Tell Me" on the Amsterdam, Antwerp and Turin stops. In March 2016, the song was included on the Melbourne stop of Madonna's Tears of a Clown show. She performed the song following a monologue aimed at an attendee who asked her why she was still performing into her mid-to-late 50s. On December, she repeated the performance at the Miami stop, which took place in the city's Faena Forum. One month earlier, she performed it during an impromptu acoustic concert at Washington Square Park in support of Hillary Clinton's presidential campaign.

"Don't Tell Me" was included on the Celebration Tour (2023–2024), where it was given a cowboy theme. Madonna donned a leather corset, a cowboy hat created by Ruslan Baginskiy, and custom-made knee-high Miu Miu steel-toe boots. During the number –which included line dancing– she was joined by one of her twin daughters, and guest star Bob the Drag Queen dressed as a rodeo clown. The performance ended with the singer engaging in a mock shootout with Bob. "Don't Tell Me" was named one of the best moments of the concert by Billboard's Joe Lynch.

== Formats and track listings ==
- US 2-track CD single, 7-inch vinyl and cassette single
1. "Don't Tell Me" (Album Version) – 4:40
2. "Don't Tell Me" (Thunderpuss' 2001 Hands in the Air Radio) – 4:26
- Canadian, Japanese and US CD maxi-single
1. "Don't Tell Me" (Timo Maas Mix) – 6:55
2. "Don't Tell Me" (Tracy Young Club Mix) – 11:01
3. "Don't Tell Me" (Vission Remix) – 7:52
4. "Don't Tell Me" (Thunderpuss' 2001 Hands in the Air Anthem) – 10:20
5. "Don't Tell Me" (Victor Calderone Sensory Mix) – 6:48
6. "Don't Tell Me" (Vission Radio Mix) – 3:38
7. "Don't Tell Me" (Thunderpuss' 2001 Hands in the Air Radio) – 4:26
8. "Don't Tell Me" (Music Video)
- US 2x12-inch vinyl
1. "Don't Tell Me" (Timo Maas Mix) – 6:55
2. "Don't Tell Me" (Vission Remix) – 7:52
3. "Don't Tell Me" (Thunderpuss' 2001 Hands in the Air Anthem) – 10:20
4. "Don't Tell Me" (Vission Radio Mix) – 3:38
5. "Don't Tell Me" (Tracy Young Club Mix) – 11:01
6. "Don't Tell Me" (Victor Calderone Sensory Mix) – 6:48
7. "Don't Tell Me" (Thunderpuss' 2001 Hands in the Air Radio) – 4:26
- Benelux and French 2-track CD single; European and UK cassette single
1. "Don't Tell Me" (Radio Edit) – 4:10
2. "Cyber-Raga" – 5:31
- Australian, Japanese and European CD maxi-single
1. "Don't Tell Me" (Radio Edit) – 4:10
2. "Cyber-Raga" – 5:31
3. "Don't Tell Me" (Thunderpuss Club Mix) – 7:53
4. "Don't Tell Me" (Vission Remix) – 7:52
- European and UK CD maxi-single 1
1. "Don't Tell Me" (Radio Edit) – 4:10
2. "Cyber-Raga" – 5:31
3. "Don't Tell Me" (Thunderpuss Club Mix) – 7:53
- European and UK CD maxi-single 2
1. "Don't Tell Me" (Album Version) – 4:40
2. "Don't Tell Me" (Vission Remix) – 7:52
3. "Don't Tell Me" (Thunderpuss Radio Mix) – 3:40
- European CD maxi-single (Remixes)
1. "Don't Tell Me" (Timo Maas Mix) – 6:55
2. "Don't Tell Me" (Tracy Young Club Mix) – 11:01
3. "Don't Tell Me" (Thunderpuss' 2001 Hands in the Air Anthem) – 10:20
4. "Don't Tell Me" (Victor Calderone Sensory Mix) – 6:48
5. "Don't Tell Me" (Vission Remix) – 7:52
- European 12-inch vinyl
1. "Don't Tell Me" (Thunderpuss Club Mix) – 7:53
2. "Don't Tell Me" (Vission Remix) – 7:52
3. "Don't Tell Me" (Tracy Young Club Mix) – 11:01
4. "Cyber-Raga" – 5:31
- European 12-inch vinyl 2
1. "Don't Tell Me" (Timo Maas Mix) – 6:55
2. "Don't Tell Me" (Victor Calderone Sensory Mix) – 6:48
3. "Don't Tell Me" (Thunderpuss' 2001 Hands in the Air Anthem) – 10:20
4. "Don't Tell Me" (Album Version) – 4:40
- Australian CD maxi-single (Remixes)
1. "Don't Tell Me" (Thunderpuss' 2001 Hands in the Air Anthem) – 10:20
2. "Don't Tell Me" (Timo Maas Mix) – 6:55
3. "Don't Tell Me" (Victor Calderone Sensory Mix) – 6:48
4. "Don't Tell Me" (Tracy Young Club Mix) – 11:01
5. "Don't Tell Me" (Thunderpuss' 2001 Tribe-A-Pella) – 8:31
6. "Don't Tell Me" (Video) – 4:41
- Asian CD maxi-single
1. "Don't Tell Me" (Vission Radio Mix) – 3:38
2. "Don't Tell Me" (Thunderpuss Radio Mix) – 3:40
3. "Don't Tell Me" (Timo Maas Mix) – 6:55
4. "Don't Tell Me" (Tracy Young Club Mix) – 11:01
5. "Don't Tell Me" (Vission Remix) – 7:52
6. "Don't Tell Me" (Tracy Young Club Mix) – 11:01
7. "Don't Tell Me" (Thunderpuss' 2001 Hands in the Air Anthem) – 10:20
8. "Don't Tell Me" (Victor Calderone Sensory Mix) – 6:48
- Digital download (2023)
1. "Don't Tell Me" (Radio Edit) – 4:11
2. "Don't Tell Me" (Vission Radio Mix) – 3:47
3. "Don't Tell Me" (Thunderpuss' 2001 Hands in the Air Radio) – 4:25
4. "Don't Tell Me" (Timo Maas Mix) – 6:55
5. "Don't Tell Me" (Tracy Young Club Mix) – 11:00
6. "Don't Tell Me" (Thunderpuss Club Mix) – 7:51
7. "Don't Tell Me" (Vission Remix) – 7:53
8. "Don't Tell Me" (Thunderpuss' 2001 Hands in the Air Anthem) – 10:20
9. "Don't Tell Me" (Victor Calderone Sensory Mix) – 6:46
10. "Cyber-Raga" – 5:32

== Credits and personnel ==
Credits are adapted from the liner notes of the CD single and Music.

=== Management ===
- Recorded at Sarm West Studios, Notting Hill, London
- Mixed at Olympic Studios, London
- Mastered at Metropolis Studios, London
- Webo Girl Publishing, Inc., Warner Bros. Music Corp (ASCAP), 1000 Lights Music Ltd, Warner-Tamerlane Publishing Corp. (BMI)

=== Personnel ===
- Madonna – songwriter, producer
- Mirwais Ahmadzaï – songwriter, producer, programming, guitar, keyboard
- Joe Henry – songwriter
- Mark "Spike" Stent – mixing
- Jake Davies – engineer
- Mark Endert – engineer
- Geoff Foster – engineer, string engineer
- Michel Colombier – string arrangement
- Kevin Reagan – art direction, design
- Matthew Lindauer – design
- Jean-Baptiste Mondino – photography

== Charts ==
=== Weekly charts ===
Weekly chart performance for "Don't Tell Me"
Chart (2000–2001)	Peak position
Australia (ARIA)	7
Australian Dance (ARIA)	2
Austria (Ö3 Austria Top 40)	12
Belgium (Ultratop 50 Flanders)	27
Belgium (Ultratop 50 Wallonia)	15
Canada (Nielsen SoundScan)	1
Canada CHR (Nielsen BDS)	2
Croatia (HRT)	8
Denmark (Tracklisten)	15
Eurochart Hot 100 (Music & Media)	2
European Radio Top 50 (Music & Media)	1
Finland (Suomen virallinen lista)	3
France (SNEP)	16
Germany (GfK)	22
Greece (IFPI)	5
Hungary (Mahasz)	3
Ireland (IRMA)	15
Italy (FIMI)	1
Netherlands (Dutch Top 40)	12
Netherlands (Single Top 100)	26
New Zealand (Recorded Music NZ)	1
Norway (VG-lista)	6
Poland (Polish Airplay Charts)	3
Scottish Singles Sales (Official Charts)	5
Spain (Promusicae)	2
Sweden (Sverigetopplistan)	12
Switzerland (Schweizer Hitparade)	10
UK Singles (Official Charts)	4
US Billboard Hot 100	4
US Adult Pop Airplay (Billboard)	4
US Dance Club Songs (Billboard)	1
US Dance Singles Sales (Billboard)	1
US Pop Airplay (Billboard)	4
US Rhythmic Airplay (Billboard)	21
US Top 40 Tracks (Billboard)	6

=== Year-end charts ===
2000 year-end chart performance for "Don't Tell Me"
Chart (2000)	Position
Sweden (Hitlistan)	96
UK Singles (OCC)	111

2001 year-end chart performance for "Don't Tell Me"
Chart (2001)	Position
Australia (ARIA)	78
Australian Dance (ARIA)	15
Brazil (Crowley)	41
Canada (Nielsen SoundScan)	26
Canada (Nielsen SoundScan) CD 1 & 2	85
Canada Radio (Nielsen BDS)	19
Eurochart Hot 100 (Music & Media)	47
European Radio Top 50 (Music & Media)	1
New Zealand (RIANZ)	19
Switzerland (Schweizer Hitparade)	89
US Billboard Hot 100	34
US Adult Top 40 (Billboard)	15
US Dance Club Play (Billboard)	7
US Mainstream Top 40 (Billboard)	27
US Maxi-Singles Sales (Billboard)	15
US Rhythmic Top 40 (Billboard)	93
US Top 40 Tracks (Billboard)	21

2002 year-end chart performance for "Don't Tell Me"
Chart (2002)	Position
Canada (Nielsen SoundScan)	165

== Certifications ==
Certifications and sales for "Don't Tell Me"
Region	Certification	Certified units/sales
Australia (ARIA)	Platinum	70,000^{^}
France (SNEP)	Gold	250,000^{*}
United Kingdom (BPI)	Silver	200,000^{‡}
United States (RIAA)	Gold	500,000^{^}
^{*} Sales figures based on certification alone.^{^} Shipments figures based on certification alone.^{‡} Sales+streaming figures based on certification alone.

== Release history ==
Release dates and formats for "Don't Tell Me"
Region	Date	Format(s)	Label(s)	Ref.
Germany	November 13, 2000	Maxi CD	Warner Music	
Japan	November 22, 2000	Maxi CD	Warner Music	
United Kingdom	November 27, 2000	Cassette; maxi CD (Note: In the UK, "Don't Tell Me" was made available in two maxi CD variants.)	Maverick	
France	November 28, 2000	12-inch vinyl; CD; maxi CD	Maverick	
United States	November 28, 2000	Contemporary hit radio	Maverick; Warner Bros.	
United States	January 16, 2001	7-inch vinyl; 12-inch vinyl; cassette; CD; maxi CD	Maverick; Warner Bros.	

== See also ==
- List of number-one singles of 2001 (Canada)
- List of number-one hits of 2000 (Italy)
- List of number-one dance singles of 2001 (U.S.)
- List of number-one singles in 2001 (New Zealand)
