= List of unreleased songs recorded by Madonna =

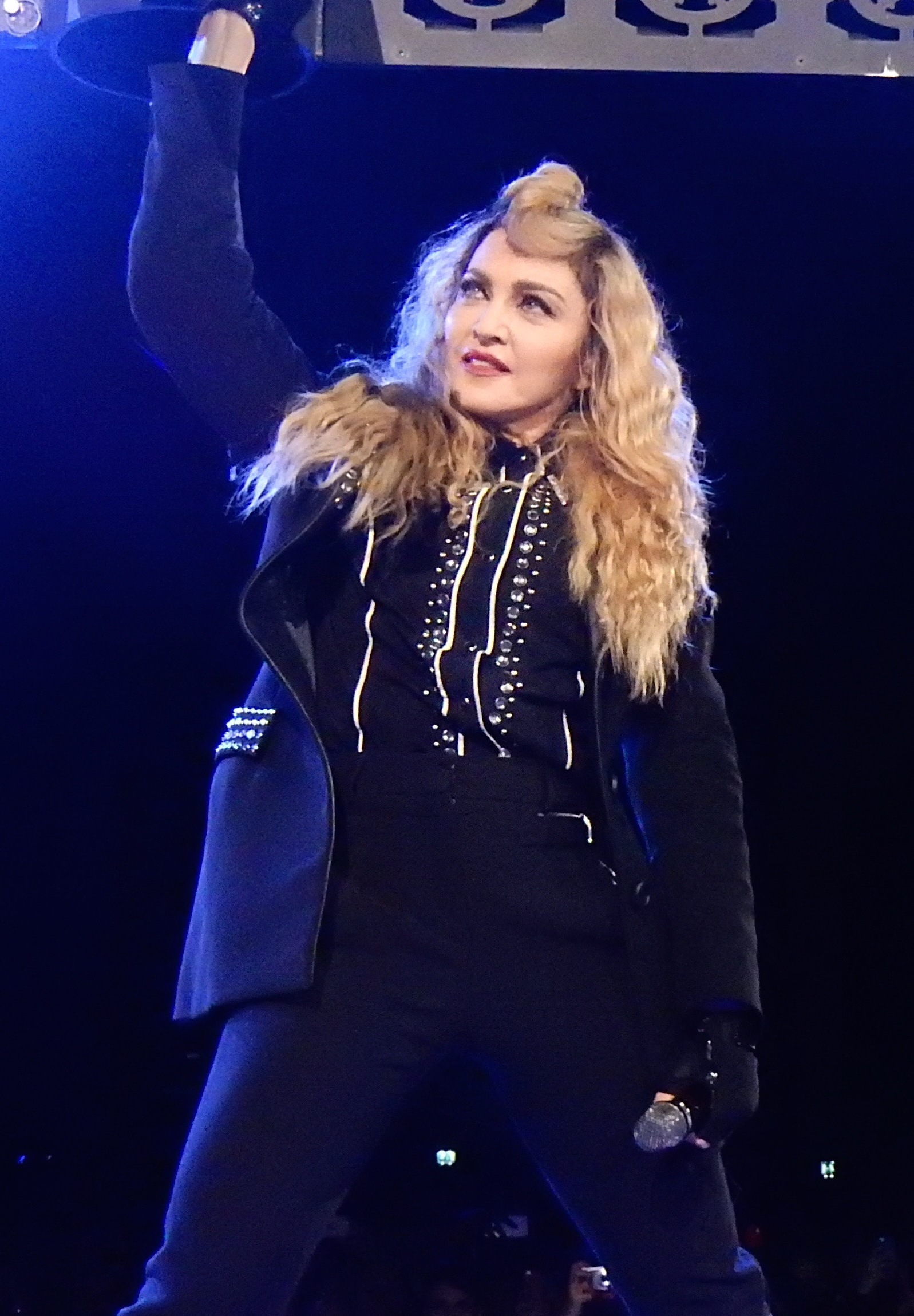
Madonna performing on the Rebel Heart Tour

The following songs recorded by Madonna were not released commercially. Some songs have been given to other recording artists for recording. The list encompasses studio-quality recordings by Madonna that were not commercially or promotionally released by a reputable label, documented demo versions of songs not released in any form, early demo versions of released songs where there is a substantial difference to the released versions (such as completely different melody), and officially commissioned and Madonna-related professional remixes not chosen for release.

== Sources of information ==
- United States Copyright Office records, Library of Congress
- Royalty Collection Agency Records (ASCAP, BMI, MCPS)
- Music Publisher Records of Madonna and her various collaborators work together.
- Reliable and credible media reports thought to be free of overseas translation errors or possible confusions.
- Interviews with Madonna's song writing partners such as Stephen Bray. He appeared in the article "Unreleased Madonna Songs" by Bruce Baron in Goldmine Magazine 1999. See transcript at Madonna Ultiography
- Actual visit in year 2000 by 1999 Goldmine article author to US copyright office to review materials discussed in article. See notes at Madonnacatalog.com

== 1979–81 ==
=== Solo and with various New York rock bands ===
- "No Running in the City" and "All My Love" appear on a 1979 acoustic, solo demo tape alongside early versions of "Simon Says", "Shine A Light" (introduced as "Hear Me"), "Little Boy Lost", "Safe Neighbourhood", "Love Express", three instrumentals and two takes of an unknown and un-named song. The tape originates from the post-Breakfast Club / pre-Emmy period when Madonna was recruiting musicians for her own ensemble. The full story of the tape – remarkable as it is performed almost entirely solo with Madonna playing guitar and singing – appears in the March 2009 issue of UK magazine Record Collector and was featured on MSNBC.
- "Born to Be a Dancer", an alternate version of "Over & Over", "Tell the Truth" and "I Got Trouble (Roll Over It)" taken from Dan and Ed Gilroy's private tapes (1979). Audio excerpts were made available by Andrew Morton on The Daily Beast news-reporting and opinion website in 2009 as "The Gilroys' Lost Madonna Tapes". Another song not made available; "Trouble" is remembered by Ed Gilroy as the first song Madonna wrote (instead of "Tell the Truth", as Madonna recalls).
- "(I Like) Love for Tender", "No Time for Love", "Bells Ringing" and "Drowning" are all featured on Madonna's studio demo tape with the band Emmy and the Emmy's in 1980. Other Emmy tracks such as "Simon Says" are not included here because they were either live recordings or already legally released on a small indie label. They belong listed on the Madonna discography page. NOTE: A studio version of "Simon Says" is included on the Shamrock Tape. See below for corrected track listing. "Do You?" and "Hothouse Flower" were performed in an art film of which excerpts have been shown on TV.
- "Tell the Truth" and "Hothouse Flower" and "Simon Says" and "I Got Trouble (Roll Over It)" and "Oh Oh (The Sky Is Blue)" and "Nobody Wants to Be Alone (Once I Thought I Was Good)" and "Well Well" – early recordings recorded on the "Shamrock" reel-to-reel tape. It was recently auctioned to a private owner. "Tell the Truth" was allegedly the very first song Madonna ever recorded (with the help of Dan Gilroy of the band The Breakfast Club). In 2005 Madonna sang the chorus of "Tell the Truth" during an interview with Parkinson on UK TV. She also discussed writing the song in Rolling Stone magazine (October 2009).
- "Take Me (I Want You)", "Best Girl" and "Nobody's Fool", with Emmy And The Emmys. Demo recordings of "Take Me (I Want You)" have leaked online. Live versions of "Best Girl" and "Nobody's Fool" songs have also leaked, along with live versions of other Emmy-era tracks (already mentioned) from this period.
- "Prisoner", "Head Over Heels", "Get Away" and "Call on Me" – possible early recordings from the Emmys era; those titles are listed on a hand-written set-list spotted in some pictures of a 1980/1981 live gig, taken by photographer George DuBose. Those pictures are famous among collectors as being related to the Underground Club performance. There is actually no evidence that Madonna recorded those songs on tape, they could be compositions written and intended just for live concerts; some audio-tape from rehearsals (featuring those songs) may or may not exist. The existence of these tracks has been confirmed as being on the actual set-list. Those Underground Club pictures can be seen in a large number of fan sites' photo-galleries and even on George DuBose's official site.
- "We Live in a House", written by Josh Braun, Janis Galloway and Madonna in 1982. US copyright registration # PAu-1-843-482. It was recorded with the second incarnation of the band Spinal Root Gang, which co-writer Josh Braun founded with his twin brother and his father in the early 80s, as he explained interviewed in 2017. In the interview Braun says he met Madonna when she was rehearsing with Emmy at the Music Building in New York, and that by coincidence around the same time she rented a room to Braun senior on the Upper East Side. Josh Braun's father wanted to put a new version of Spinal Root Gang together with Madonna as a singer. She asked if her friend Janis Galloway could be part of the band too and they agreed. Josh says they wrote "We Live in a House" together and recorded a demo with his father playing saxophone and Madonna as the only singer, since for some reason she said Janis that the scheduled recording wasn't happening. Sample lyric: "We live in a house, and people just don't care. We live in a house, they don't go anywhere." Madonna screams at one point: "You can't come into my house."
- "The Sky Is Blue". Written and performed by Madonna. The song appears on a cassette auctioned in Invaluable.com. In the overview, Dan Gilroy remembers: "This cassette has a very early Madonna song that she wrote and sings alone, playing the Carlo Rbelli acoustic guitar. It's possible that no one else has ever heard this song. Her handwriting is on the cassette. This cassette has 2 performances of Madonna singing "The Sky Is Blue."
- "Kiss Me", "Coming in Fine", "Moving Along", "Hot House Flower", "While My Baby Walks the Streets", "Tears in My Eye", "Coming in Fine", "I Wonder What Happened to Her", "Letter from Daddy", "Hurry Hurry Hurry", and "Song for Danny" are featured on a cassette auctioned by Invaluable.com. All songs written by Madonna.
- "Bird Free", "Trouble", "Shine a Light", and "Tell the Truth" are featured on a cassette auctioned by Invaluable.com.
- "Curtis Come Back", "Glad You Were Born", "Trouble", "Hot House Flower", "Give It a Try", "Born to be a Dancer", "Even My Tears Run Away from Me", and "Again and Again" are featured on a Vintage Shamrock Recording Reel tape auctioned by Invaluable.com. Madonna sings, plays drums and guitar.
- "Say hey, Joe" is featured along with "Curtis Come Back", "Again and Again", "Trouble", and "Hot House Flower" in a cassette auctioned by Invaluable.com.

=== Solo vocal recordings ===
- "I Want You", "Love on the Run", "Get Up" and "High Society", a Pat Benatar style pop-rock Madonna demo produced under the direction of Madonna's first manager Camille Barbone of August Artists Ltd and Gotham Sound Studios in New York City with guitarist Jon Gordon in 1981. All four of these tracks have leaked on the internet in high quality. Two more songs were recorded at Mediasound Studios but not used on the 1981 demo circulating at the time called "Remembering Your Touch" and "Are You Ready For It" which are also reasonably easily available for internet download.
- "Shake Your Head (Let's Go To Bed)" Madonna recorded lead vocal with Don and David for the Was (Not Was) album Born to Laugh at Tornadoes produced in Detroit in 1982–83. The released vocal were by Ozzy Osbourne with backing vocals by Kathy Kosins and Carol Hall. Madonna and John "Jellybean" Benitez are both in the album credits. During a May 2006 Kathy Kosins phone interview with Bruce Baron it was revealed that Ozzy recorded his vocal first. Kathy and Carol added vocals in Detroit. Kathy's vocals were intended to be replaced by Madonna by producer Don Was. Madonna's label Sire Records did not agree to the release and Kathy's vocals were restored for the ZE Records release as a backing track. Kathy then became a longtime Was (not Was) contributor. Madonna originally became involved via her friendship with Stephen Bray and his group The Breakfast Club who were also signed with ZE Records (later acquired by MCA). Madonna requested her original vocal not to be used in an early 1990s remix released as a single in Europe to support a Was (Not Was) Greatest Hits album. Kim Basinger did the new vocals. The 1990s remix version with Madonna's vocals leaked onto the internet in April 2008.
- "Sidewalk Talk", written by Madonna for former producer and boyfriend John "Jellybean" Benitez. The 1983 commercially released version features vocalist Catherine Buchanan on lead vocals and Madonna singing on the chorus and bridge. The original demo version with Madonna on the lead vocal remains unreleased and was produced with Stephen Bray as confirmed by interviews.
- "Afterglo", "Rock Your Body", "Girl with Stars in Her Eyes", "Swing with Me" and "Cherish". In early 2011 several other previously unknown songs came to light penned by Madonna via handwritten lyric sheets on an auction site. Cherish is different from the song of the same title from the Like A Prayer album released in 1989. To date, these songs have not been released.

== 1982–89 ==
=== Madonna ===
- "Ain't No Big Deal" The released version was produced by Reggie Lucas in 1982 and appeared as the B-side of her "True Blue" single in 1986, though this is an alternate version to the unreleased version mentioned above. Originally intended to be Madonna's first single. Three more separate unreleased studio versions were also produced each by Mark Kamins, Stephen Bray and John "Jellybean" Benitez. They were all shelved by Sire Records when the song was recorded and released in 1983 by the female disco act Barracuda on 12-inch vinyl Epic Records release 49-04264. "Ain't No Big Deal" was included in the US compilation album Revenge of the Killer B's, Vol. 2. On June 12, 2024, the song was released onto digital platforms as a B-side to "Papa Don't Preach".
- "Physical Attraction", US copyright registration PAu-484-430 from February 1983 credits words and music created in 1982 only to Madonna as sole author as does April 1983 publisher transfer registration PAu-506-929. Producer Reggie Lucas is not credited as the sole author of this song until 1984 registration PA-210-598 for the 12" commercial single release for the work created and published in 1983 and has been the only credited songwriter since.
- "Writer's Block", listed in the MCPS-PRS database as being written by Madonna and Richard Lewis Warren for the 1984 TV show Cover Up starring Jon Erik-Hexum and Jennifer O'Neill. An episode by this name first aired on November 24, 1984 (Season 1, Episode 7) without crediting either Madonna or Richard Lewis Warren. However, that episode does include "Lucky Star" which means this entry is most likely an error in the database.

=== Vision Quest soundtrack ===
- "Warning Signs", the third Madonna song recorded for the soundtrack to the film but never used. It remains unheard by the public to this day. A collaboration with Stephen Bray from 1984, US copyright registration# PAu-590-962. Bray describes it as a cool synth track. The lyric sheet reveals the opening intro as "I see danger up ahead", "Warning (echo), Warning (echo)". Chorus is "Warning I see danger up ahead. I can see it in your eyes, and it's really no surprise. Because, I can see your warning signs". Supposed complete lyrics for the song have surfaced online on various lyric websites.

=== Like a Virgin ===
- "(title uncertain)", Simon Le Bon of the group Duran Duran mentioned in a mid-1980s interview for the BBC TV show Breakfast that Madonna did backing vocals for them that were never released. On Duran Duran's official website in the 'Ask Katy' section the band members denied that Madonna ever recorded backing vocals on any of their tracks.
- "Desperately Seeking Susan", written by Madonna and Stephen Bray. Unreleased title track for the Orion Pictures movie of the same name according to former Madonna collaborator Stephen Bray from 1999 interview. Another "Desperately Seeking Susan" title song was written by Michael Bramon. "Into the Groove" overshadowed both "Susan" themes, and both were shelved.

=== True Blue ===
- "Working My Fingers to the Bone" and "Pipeline", recorded with frequent collaborator Stephen Bray.
- "Spotlight", original version 1985 US copyright registration PAu-716-379 written in 1984. Curtis Hudson & Lisa Stevens. Stevens's demo version sounds remarkably like "Holiday" which she also co-wrote. Madonna and Stephen Bray changed lyrics and music to this in 1985 via copyright registration PAu-924-278. The demo also has a different rhythm and chorus melody. Sample lyric "Spotlight shine on you. Be what you want to be, do what you want to do" and "Spotlight shine so bright, spotlight shine tonight". A short clip of the demo version is available on the internet.
- "(title(s) unknown)", musician Fred Zarr tried to write two or three songs with Madonna around the time of "Papa Don't Preach" but never finished.
- "Each Time You Break My Heart", written and produced by Madonna and Stephen Bray. Nick Kamen later recorded his version of this song with Madonna as backing vocals. It was a big hit in Europe (number 1 in Italy, number 5 in the UK in November 1986). Madonna's version has appeared on various file-sharing networks. Bray described Madonna's demo in an interview with Bruce Baron for Goldmine Magazine as "virtually unchanged from the version later recorded and released by Nick Kamen".
- "Tell Me" Stephen Bray confirmed the existence of this demo with Madonna singing as the lead vocal; in the Extended version, Nick Kamen sings lead vocals and Madonna sings backing vocals and a solo.
- "I Want You" Stephen Bray confirmed the existence of this unreleased track in an interview with Madonna music expert, Peter Magennis in 2009. To date this song has never been leaked.

=== Like a Prayer ===
- "Possessive Love", written and recorded with Patrick Leonard, Madonna and Jai Winding. CMRRA database# 875911 Madonna's original demo was given to singer Marilyn Martin for her to record. The song was included on her 1988 album This is Serious. The song was also released as a single by Atlantic Records in 1988 but did not do very well. ASCAP title code #460268111
- "Love Attack" and "First Is a Kiss" Two songs Madonna recorded and produced with Stephen Bray but were never used. In 1989 Madonna talked in a Bravo magazine about "First Is a Kiss" as explaining that it is a song about the friends she lost because of AIDS.
- "Just A Dream" (original Madonna demo) Written by Madonna and Patrick Leonard. Given later to her long-time backing vocalist Donna De Lory for her MCA self-titled debut solo album. Madonna does appear on backing vocals, but the original Madonna lead vocal recording remains unreleased. DeLory's version did manage to crack the US Dance Club Play Chart.
- "Angels With Dirty Faces" Bruce Gaitsch, co-writer of "La Isla Bonita" and guitarist on "True Blue" and "Like a Prayer" alluded to the fact that he was involved with this unreleased track in an interview with Madonna music expert, Peter Magennis in 2006. "I have a tape somewhere of some songs I had to learn parts from and none of these songs are on it. But there is a song called Angels with Dirty Faces on it that is killer". On July 11, 2017, the co-writer of the track, Patrick Leonard, shared a 20 second video clip of the song on his official Instagram page. On July 22, 2019, Patrick Leonard published the full demo on his YouTube channel after discovering that someone had sold it at an auction.
- "I Surrender Dear" was recorded for the 1989 film, Bloodhounds of Broadway, where Madonna sang it with actress Jennifer Grey, but the song was not included in the soundtrack and has never appeared on any legally published records.

== 1990–99 ==
=== I'm Breathless and The Immaculate Collection ===
- "Dick Tracy", written by Patrick Leonard. This did not appear on the I'm Breathless album. ASCAP title code# 340325268. Another "Dick Tracy" performed by Madonna is listed in the APRA database id code# GW04472893 and was written solely by Daniel Elfman.
- "Dog House" Another title reported in Billboard magazine circa 1990 for the film Dick Tracy. A song titled "You're in the Dog House Now" performed by Brenda Lee and co-written by Andy Paley was included on the Dick Tracy soundtrack. This is a possible replacement for the Madonna recorded track, considering the precedents of Madonna's own recordings of "Now I'm Following You" which was replaced in the film by a version sung by co-writer Andy Paley, and "Back In Business" being replaced by a same-titled track by Stephen Sondheim.
- Various "Dick Tracy" demos – Leaked on 7-inch bootleg vinyl in the early-1990s at record collector shows under the name of "MA-HONEY". Rehearsal sound quality is rather poor and the printed jacket track listing was incorrect and is corrected as follows "More", "I Always Get My Man" (actually "Sooner or Later"), "What Can You Get" (actually "What Can You Lose", sung by Madonna only (ie without her duet partner Mandy Patinkin)). These recordings (which included two different versions of 'I Always Get My Man' and a demo version of 'Now I'm Following You') were included on a bootleg album called 'Calendar Girl' in 1991. This album is credited to a "B. Mahoney" and includes the official Color Mix of "True Blue", four songs from the Blond Ambition Tour live in Barcelona, the faux-Madonna track 'Lies in Your Eyes', and a recording of Madonna singing "Santa Baby" taken from the A Very Special Christmas compilation released in 1987.
- "To Love You", written by Madonna and Andy Paley. Listed in the Warner-Chappel database but remains unreleased. The demo was re-recorded in 1994 but it is unreleased too. The supposed full lyrics for this song have been published on several song lyric websites.
- "Get Over", recorded with Stephen Bray around the time of the Immaculate Collection. (It was going to be the third new song on the greatest hits album.) Madonna's demo version remains unreleased. The song was later recorded and released by actor/model Nick Scotti with Madonna backing vocals produced by Madonna and Shep Pettibone for the film Nothing But Trouble in 1992. Listed as song #301415 in the CMRRA database. It was also included on Nick Scotti's self-titled debut album, and released as a single.

=== Erotica ===
- "Dear Father", an unreleased collaboration with André Betts and Mic Murphy (former member of duo The System). An uptempo dance track. Part of the lyrics include: "Dear Father forgive me/ I don't know what I've done..." The song appears in the EMI Music publishing database and in the UK based MCPS system. APRA id# GW09823950. This demo leaked in its entirety online in June 2008.
- "Love Hurts" – A unique song title listed in the discography of producer/remixer Junior Vasquez. See Junior Vasquez Music Site. This is an early version of ‘Erotica’ with a different chorus and slightly altered lyrics. Leaked to the internet in March 2017.
- "You Are The One", U.S. copyright registration# PAu-1-605-636 Song from The Rain Tapes written by Madonna, Shep Pettibone and Tony Shimkin not used on the album. The lyrics include, "You are the one, my only one – you are the one for me". The sound is very dance/club/house. It was abandoned in the demo stage. On December 19, the complete lyrics leaked onto the Internet. The refrain runs, "You (you) are the one (are the one), Make me feel, Our love is alive..." A fake fan-made version leaked on the fake Rain Tapes. The full demo leaked online on July 27, 2014.
- "Shame", U.S. copyright registration# PAu-1-605-637 and separate ASCAP registration# 491644325. Also a CMRRA song registration# 1776484 Song from The Rain Tapes not used on the album. The song opens with a spoken intro, "Why do you wanna waste your life away? It's a shame." Later she sings, "Anyone can learn to fly, keep your head up..." She also says, "You've got no one to blame." The chorus starts with "It's a Shaaaaaame", which sounds similar to the song of the same title and time period by Monie Love. This is possibly the source of the rumor that she and Madonna were going to do something together. The similarity ends there, with Madonna's "Shame" breaking off into its own unique melody. A 20-second clip has leaked on the Internet. On December 19, the complete lyrics were leaked. The full demo leaked online on July 27, 2014.
- "Goodbye to Innocence", alternate version written and produced by Madonna, Shep Pettibone and Tony Shimkin. U.S. copyright registration# PAu-1-605-640 – This is very different from the commercially released remixed version which appeared on the various artists collection Just Say Roe and in a further revised dub from as "Up Down Suite" as one of the B-sides for the "Rain" single. The unreleased demo versions use the same theme and many of the same lyrics, but everything is switched around. It is a different vocal recording (strong-and-clear unlike the commercial mix). Much of the song's melody is different including the chorus. The arrangement is pure pop-funk-dance, no club remix style here. Extra lyrics include the spoken line: "Goodbye to innocence, anonyminity [sic], peace of mind.." The chorus includes: "You know you'd better stop, stop and think..." A full demo of this song leaked onto the Internet in February 2008. Another version with similar arrangements to "Fever" is available on the internet.
- "Actions Speak Louder Than Words" (two alternate demo versions) – Both versions are without the eastern instrument found in the released version simply called "Words". Instead the synth keys that are found at the end of the commercial mix are used during the chorus. There is also a subtle guitar-like sound. Additional lyrics include "I can't fight with your words, they come disguised as love, but your words are so cruel", and "I can't fight with your words, they pretend to be kind, but your words are for fools". The backing vocals and bridge arrangements are slightly different. U.S. copyright office registration PAu-1-605-641. As with most of the Rain Tapes tracks, fakes are in circulation which have no relevance to the authentic demos. Finally, one of the real demos leaked online on September 26, 2019.
- "Erotica" (unreleased demo). U.S. copyright registration PAu-1-605-642 – Madonna incorporated this demo into the versions of Erotica that she performed on both her 2006 Confessions Tour and 2023-2024 The Celebration Tour, being the former live performance taped in London officially released for the live album The Confessions Tour. It is significantly different from the released album version. The verse lyrics are the same as those used on the album, though there is no trace of the familiar chorus lyric "Erotic, Erotic, put your hands all over my body". Instead Madonna sings a different chorus line with a different melody in the same type of voice that ends with the line:

"....You are who you are....and I
Wouldn't want to change a thing...in spite of
All the pain that love can bring...
Tell me, what can I do? I'm so in love with you.
You thrill me, surround me, you fill me
You send me, you put me in a trance
You fill me, inside of me, you take me
You thrill me, you put me in a trance."

The instrumentation is approximately the same as the commercial mix but the released mix is more distinctive, more complex, and more exotic. The Rough Mix includes the complete refrain, "Erotica, romance, I'd like to put you in a trance...". A full demo of this song, called "Final Demo 2", leaked onto the internet in February 2008.

- "Jitterbug" (song fragment, about 30–45 seconds) – Included on The Rain Tapes cassette tapes submitted by Shep Pettibone to the U.S. copyright office. It was mostly taped over, but showed up between two of the other tracks. It is listed on the handwritten tape label, but it has no copyright registration of its own. The title was originally spelled with a "G", but was written over darker with a "J" in blue ink. It features typical generic Shep Pettibone dance music with Madonna finishing up with "Jitterbug, Jitterbug". Madonna stops singing but the music continues, and she can be heard asking: "Is this gonna go on forever and ever? Somebody end this dance lesson." The music abruptly stops. She then says into the microphone: "There were some cute ideas there." A fake is in circulation which uses a Cathy Dennis instrumental and a peculiar vocal which seems to be a recreation of the word "Jitterbug" using the relevant vowels and consonants from other Madonna songs as well as an excerpt from Truth or Dare – "Do I have to listen to this?" In 2011, Tony Shimkin, co-producer of the track, confirmed in an interview that this song was intended to be featured in A League of Their Own together with "This Used to Be My Playground". However, it was abandoned because, as Shimkin states: "we were in the middle of so many other things at the time and maybe there wasn’t a necessity for it in the movie." Leaked onto the internet in September 2019.
- "Thief of Hearts" (alternate demo versions) U.S. copyright registration# PAu-1-605-643 – Uses slightly different intro, bridge and outro arrangements. One version has what was eventually the end of the song placed at the beginning. One uses the voice of a southern black woman to say the line "sit your ass down" instead of Madonna herself as done on the commercial release, and Madonna is briefly heard laughing immediately after. A full-length version of one of the demos – Old Music – became available on file-sharing networks in February 2008. The others in circulation are, as before, fakes. The 'New Music' demo leaked in September 2019.
- "Secret Garden (Demo Version)", demo version of the released last album track. It features same lyrics and music, but the vocals are stronger and clearer, with some alternate music choice, i.e. in some points there's only the bass line and Madonna's voice. It clocks 3'47, and has been available online since July 2008.

=== Bedtime Stories ===
- "Something's Coming Over Me" – The unreleased original version of the song "Secret" written and produced with Shep Pettibone and then abandoned. US copyright registration# PAu-1-889-253. This version does not have the downbeat guitar R&B vibe of the released song. During the unique bridge of the unreleased demo the music drops out and Madonna speaks: "I see your love coming down..." Then the bass and the drum kick back up in club anthem style where she sings: "Something's coming over me..."
- "I Will Always Have You" – The unreleased original version of what became the released song "Inside of Me" recorded with Shep Pettibone and then abandoned. US copyright registration# PAu-1-889-251. This ballad sounds more like the familiar style of "Crazy for You" or "You'll See" than what later became the soft, lullaby-like released version. The released song's theme is all about Madonna cherishing the memory of a loved one, but in this demo she also wants to be the object of the song to also be remembered. The words "inside of me" are hardly used but many of the same lyrics are switched around. The melody is significantly different from the released version.
- "I'd Rather Be Your Lover (feat. Tupac Shakur)", an alternate version of the song where, instead of Me'Shell NdegeOcello rapping the breakdown, Tupac is rapping. This version was originally meant to be released, but was scrapped due to serious criminal charges brought against the late rapper and since the album was to present a kinder, more gentle Madonna, any unnecessary controversy was best avoided. Leaked to the internet in November 2009.
- "Love Won't Wait" (original 1994 demo), a song abandoned and not used on the Bedtime Stories album. Madonna and Shep Pettibone later gave it to former Take That singer Gary Barlow. The track was not written specifically for him. He received a demo tape with that song including her lead and backing vocals. The unreleased Madonna demo is US copyright registration# PAu-1-889-250. The demo leaked around the year 2000. Madonna's version has a strong clear vocal with bubblegum instrumentation that vaguely sounds like synth-Motown. The original demo edit for "Love Won't Wait" was eventually released through digital download and streaming platforms on November 21, 2025, as the third and final promo single for Bedtime Stories: The Untold Chapter.
- "Bring It", written and produced by Madonna and Shep Pettibone but never released. US copyright registration# PAu-1-889-252. Partial lyric reads: "I know your love is bad for me, but I won't give up until you bring it to me." On October 10, 2025, an alleged recording of this demo surfaced on YouTube, with vocals presumably not by Madonna, which prompted to commenters on the YouTube video allegations of inauthenticity and using of AI to reconstruct it; due to the fact the video also features an alternate recording of "Right on Time," also labeled as an "early first version" for it, the same allegations have been made to the latter (see below).
- "Goodtime" and "Tongue Tied", listed in the Warner/Chappell Music database, Both songs are listed as written by Madonna and Shep Pettibone, copyright ASCAP.
- "Right on Time", written by Madonna and Dallas Austin. Listed in the European MCPS database. APRA id# GW0916567. While this track did not leak on the internet and remained as a "cut" that "many Madonna diehards have been waiting decades to hear," it ended up to be released on October 9, 2025 as the lead single for Bedtime Stories: The Untold Chapter. The day following of its official release, a recording of "Right on Time" surfaced on YouTube, labeled as an "early first version" for it, along with a recording of "Bring It," described by the video as in the same way the former was done, with vocals by some unknown singer, although also credited to Madonna. The authenticity of both demos is controversial as pointed out by YouTube users through their comments on that video (see above).
- Early demo versions for Dallas Austin co-penned album tracks "Survival" and "Don't Stop," being the former titled "Quiet Storm Demo," to be officially released as featured on Bedtime Stories: The Untold Chapter. These two demos, plus "Love Won't Wait" and "Right on Time," were reported by some online stores as having made part of the "Redemption sessions," a presumable/officially unconfirmed early/tentative title for Bedtime Stories. When the EP that features these demos got released, it was noticed that the "Quiet Storm Demo" of "Survival" shares music elements with another song written and produced by Dallas Austin (and released around the same time of Bedtime Stories album), "Creep," a single from the American girl group TLC.

=== Something to Remember ===
- "I Can't Forget" An unreleased collaboration with David Foster. Recorded with two other released songs for the Something to Remember retrospective album but this one was never used. BMI work# 2133633 published by Peermusic Ltd. and Warner/Chappell Music. The song was later recorded by Tilt. They released their version titled "Come Closer" on their 2006 album Vaults. Madonna is credited as writer of the song. The song was also given to Canadian singer Angelica DiCastro for her album "Beautiful Feeling". The song is credited to David Foster and Madonna. A couple of clips from Madonna's demo version leaked onto the internet on September 26, 2008. On February 17, 2010, Madonna's demo version leaked to the internet in full.
- "You'll Stay", written with Patrick Leonard and appeared in publishing records. Also found at the APRA site, song id# GW15524580.
- "Indian Summer", written in 1995. Found as ID #GW14567699. A short excerpt of the song was used in a 1995 Japanese Takara commercial, with the slogan "Takara Jun Legend". Lyrics include "How can I be pure (how can I be pure), All the strength I have, is breaking me, How can I be sure (How can I be sure), Where the road I chose, is taking me."

=== Ray of Light ===
- "Be Careful", written and produced by Madonna and Patrick Leonard only, APRA song id# GW23038624. A possible early version of the song "Be Careful (Cuidado Con Mi Corazon)" recorded with Ricky Martin and William Orbit, APRA song id# GW1552449. Leonard is not credited on the released Madonna-Orbit version with Ricky Martin but he has his own separate Madonna-Leonard documented entry in the Warner-Chappell publishing database. Oddly, the CMRRA lists them all, along with Susan Leonard, as co-writers together on one song work# 732670. The ASCAP database lists only Madonna and William Orbit as writers, with the song listed as "Cuidado Con Mi Corazon". In September 2010, another supposed demo leaked. This file was titled "Corazon" and contains Madonna singing over typical William Orbit synths. This may in fact be a fan creation and not a real demo recording as the music appears to be sampled from William Orbit's single "Dice" for Finley Quaye in collaboration with Beth Orton.
- "Gone, Gone, Gone" – A song written with Rick Nowels from the early Ray of Light album sessions in 1997, before Orbit became involved with the project. The song appeared on the internet. Sometimes the song was also titled "Gone Gone Gone (This Love Affair Is Over)," as, for instance, in some music videos of this demo that have been uploaded for years on YouTube. On June 5, 2025, it was announced that this track, in its original demo form, would be featured on Veronica Electronica, a remix EP announced officially as a "long-rumored project" with "rare and unreleased remixes" from Ray of Light singles. "Gone, Gone, Gone" was released officially on digital download and streaming platforms around July 2025, two weeks in advance to Veronica Electronica release day. The officially released demo subsequently topped the iTunes charts from several countries.
- "Like a Flower" – CMRRA song registration# 888544. The demo of this song leaked onto the Internet around 2003. It was later given to Italian singer Laura Pausini for her 2004 album Resta In Ascolto (Italian for "Remain listening!") and re-titled "Mi Abbandono A Te" (Italian for "I Give Up on You"). ASCAP song registration# 431644652; CMRRA song registration# 1012340. This song was recorded also in Spanish with the title "Me Abandono A Ti" for the Spanish version of "Resta In Ascolto" named "Escucha" (Spanish for "Listen!").
- "No Substitute for Love", the original name for what became "Drowned World/Substitute for Love" with different lyrics, vocal melody and instrumentation. The chorus starting: "Face the truth, no substitute for love". The song is also without the San Sebastian Strings sample of "Why I Follow the Tigers" that is present in the released version. This version has leaked onto the internet.
- "Regfresando", a Madonna and Patrick Leonard collaboration of unknown origin, listed in the Warner-Chappell database as Regfresando. APRA song id# GW19069760. The never released title might actually be a misspelling for the Spanish word Regresando which translates to English as meaning Returning. Until additional information is provided, the inclusion of the letter f in the original word spelling is thought by many fans to be nonsensical and probably listed incorrectly in the publisher database.
- "Revenge" – CMRRA song registration# 742435. The song was one of the early demos of the Ray of Light album from 1997, produced by Greg Fitzgerald and Rick Nowels before William Orbit's involvement in the project. In 2002 it was rumored to be the new recorded song from Madonna for the James Bond movie, and the leaked demo even got some airplay. In early 2005 it was also rumored to be Madonna's new single from her then upcoming album Confessions On A Dancefloor. The song has since been recorded by English singer Sophie Ellis-Bextor, as revealed by Peter Magennis in an interview with Greg Fitzgerald for his July 2008 cover feature for UK magazine, Record Collector (issue #351). A vinyl acetate exists, the version is 3 minutes 45 seconds.
- "You'll Stay," a song produced by Patrick Leonard. The song leaked in February 2019.
- "I'll Be Gone" and "Never Love A Stranger" produced by Babyface. Both songs leaked in 2019.
- "Flirtation Dance", an early version of "Skin" produced by Madonna and Patrick Leonard.

== 2000–09 ==
=== Music ===
- "Alone Again", a Madonna co-write with Rick Nowels, CMRRA song registration# 1775314. A song widely publicised in the media in 2002 as having been recorded by Kylie Minogue. The Minogue version was supposed to be the B-side to her "Come into My World" single, but the song remained unreleased until it was featured in the Kylie documentary "White Diamond", which premiered on October 16, 2007. Madonna and Rick Nowels are credited as writers. Madonna is also thanked in the credits of the film. Madonna has two ASCAP entries for this song. Her own version remains unreleased.
- "Like an Angel Passing Through My Room" Madonna and Orbit covered this ABBA song during the Music sessions. The demo and the Orbit instrumental leaked onto the internet on August 15, 2008.
- "Little Girl" and "La Petite Jeune Fille" (translation: "The Little Girl") Written and produced with William Orbit, recorded during the Music sessions. The original ballad "Little Girl" leaked onto the internet on September 18, 2010. An early demo instrumental version of the song, with the title of 'Dear Pumpkin' leaked onto the internet in April 2011. Confirmed ASCAP title codes 420566552. 420566570 and 430653519. The second version of the song, "La Petite Jeune Fille" with similar lyrics, is an up-tempo dance song (resembling "Runaway Lover" from the same album) and leaked on the internet on December 14, 2011. A William Orbit produced alternate demo also leaked in April 2021.
- "Liquid Love", co-written and produced by William Orbit, originates from late 1999, presumably from the same sessions that yielded "Amazing" and "Runaway Lover", which would end up being featured on her Music album in 2000. Madonna confirmed in a 2005 interview with Attitude that the track was also supposed to be on the album but was axed because it gave her "the wrong tingles". When the song leaked onto the internet on June 3, 2006, it became clear that the song "Bubble Universe" from William Orbit's album Hello Waveforms was actually based on the same instrumental track. An alternate mix of "Liquid Love" leaked onto the internet on August 15, 2008.
- "Mysore Smile". Written and produced with William Orbit but never used or released. Instrumental leaked by William Orbit in 2013. It appeared to be an early version of "Cyber-Raga", a B-side for "Music" and "Don't Tell Me" and also a bonus track for the Japanese and Australian editions of Music, the album. Mysore is a city in India, a center of yoga and meditation study.
- "Run". Written and produced with William Orbit but never used or released. Confirmed ASCAP title code 480358398. "Run" has since been released in instrumental form on William Orbit's official Streamcast site, with the track retitled "Forbidden Planet". It was also revealed by Peter Magennis in a 2008 interview with madonnalicious.com that Swedish girl group Sahara Hotnights recorded a cover of "Run" that remains unreleased, as was revealed to Peter during his interview with long-time Orbit collaborator, Rico Conning. On January 11, 2011, William Orbit commented on "Run" on his Twitter account. He stated that he would not release the song, after receiving multiple requests from fans to leak the song in full. Clips of Madonna's Run demo leaked onto the internet on April 19, 2011, the full demo leaking two days later.
- "Arioso", written and produced by Madonna and William Orbit. The title was misspelled as "Ariosa". In classical music, arioso is a type of solo vocal piece, usually occurring in an opera. Literally, arioso means airy. This song is actually from where the notorious Wonderland 47-seconds track – used for a TV series from 1999 – comes (see below). A 30-second snippet leaked online, on August 4, 2014. The song leaked in full on December 25, 2014 amidst the mass leak of demos from her album Rebel Heart. The demo was based on Johann Sebastian Bach's Arioso, Adagio in G from Cantata BWV 156.
- "Wonderland", the 45-second score to the short lived ABC TV show of the same name. The series aired only two episodes due to controversial content which viewers found disturbing. ASCAP title code 530521409. Written by Madonna and William Orbit. The full track remained unreleased until "Arioso" surfaced at Christmas 2014 (see above). When various other Madonna demos recorded with William Orbit leaked onto the internet in the summer of 2008, a slightly different version of this track leaked, crediting actor Rupert Everett as a co-vocalist (cf. William Orbit's blog post 54).
- "The Funny Song". ASCAP Title Code: 501807576. Writers: Ciccone Madonna L. Madonna performed a live version of this song as part of her 2001 Drowned World Tour setlist, calling it her "brand new song". Madonna recorded a studio version in preparation for the tour, along with the rest of the setlist. While most of the other studio recorded setlist songs have been made available online, the studio version of this song remains unleaked. The track is also listed in the Warner/Chappell Music database with Madonna again credited as sole composer. The song is often listed as "Oh Dear Daddy" or "The Funny Song (Oh Dear Daddy)" on lyric web sites, due to its chorus.
- "(title(s) unknown)", two songs recorded with Belgian-Congolese fusion group Zap Mama mixed by Pairs-based Bengali artist Subhendu Bapi Das Baul says the Screen India June 8, 2001. Plus a third recording is a Madonna guest vocal on a Bapi Das Baul track says the India Today April 2, 2001. Ultimately, Shubhendu ended up cutting not one, but two tracks. So far, these collaborations have not surfaced.

=== Die Another Day soundtrack ===
- "Can't You See My Mind" Recorded and produced with French-techno producer Mirwais Ahmadzaï for the James Bond film Die Another Day. Widely reported in the media and was revealed to be an alternate title for "Die Another Day". Listing confirmed at Warner-Chappell Music Publishing. Also ASCAP title code# 330991414.

=== American Life ===
- "Cool Song" is a track written with Mirwais and Monte Pittman. A remixed version by Paul Oakenfold, retitled "It's So Cool", appears as an iTunes-only bonus track on Madonna's greatest hits compilation Celebration (see below). The original recording from 2002 leaked in full onto the internet on August 31, 2010. It features a stripped-down, acoustic performance by Madonna and includes a children's choir during the final chorus. Another recording without the choir leaked on September 1, 2010 and is most likely an earlier version of the 2002 recording.
- "The Game" is a song written and produced with Mirwais. It became available on file-sharing networks in August 2008. The song has a stripped-down acoustic folk feel.
- “Miss You” is a song written and produced during the American Life sessions with Mirwais, but didn’t end up on the finalised album. It is a stripped-down folk ballad, and the demo leaked online in September 2010. One line was later recycled for “Like it Or Not”, a song from her 2005 album Confessions On A Dance Floor.
- "Set the Right" is a song produced by Mirwais and recorded during the American Life sessions. It was later suggested to be titled as "To the Left, To the Right" or "Set To Right" without further proof or citation. The song leaked in full as "Set the Right" on Internet on September 18, 2010.
- "React". Listed on the BMI Music Licensing website. BMI Work #7337527. Composers are Ahmadzai, Mirwais and Ciccone, Madonna L. The song remains unleaked.

=== Re-Invention Tour era & musicals projects ===
- "I'm in Love with Love" A song supposedly written with Mirwais and Monte Pittman during the 2004 Re-Invention World Tour. It was actually recorded between American Life and the "Post Re-Invention Tour Musicals". To confuse this timeline, the individual who leaked the song mixed it with the original "I Love New York" from I'm Going To Tell You A Secret. Both of these tracks are indicative of the sound originally conceptualised for the next album, before the project evolved into what became Confessions On A Dance Floor. The full song leaked on Internet on September 20, 2010. A low-quality clip of an alternate version with different lyrics has leaked, as well.
- "Miss You", "If You Go Away", "How High", "Curtain", "The Devil Wouldn't Recognize You" and "Is this Love (Bon D'Accord)" – among a number of songs written for a planned musical Hello Suckers, a 1920s-style musical loosely based on the life of Texas Guinan. Songs were written with a number of co-writers including Patrick Leonard and Mirwais Ahmadzaï. Lyrics from "How High" were later reworked into a song for Confessions on a Dance Floor. Some lyrics from "Is This Love" were later re-used on the song "Voices" on the album Hard Candy. "The Devil Wouldn't Recognize You" was planned to be included on The Re-Invention Tour, but was later reworked with Madonna's brother-in-law Joe Henry. Ultimately, the song did not surface until the album Hard Candy following further development with Timbaland, Justin Timberlake and Nate Hills. "Is this Love (Bon D'Accord)" has since been leaked to the internet. "If You Go Away" is based on the classic "Ne me quitte pas" by Jaques Brel. The English version has been covered by a wide range of artists, including Marlene Dietrich, Shirley Bassey and Tom Jones. Madonna's version leaked onto the internet on September 2, 2010.
- "(titles unknown)" – A second musical to have been directed by filmmaker Luc Besson was also in pre-production during 2005, but was abandoned when Madonna read the script and was dissatisfied with the result. See Observer Guardian UK Madonna interview Nov 2005.

=== Confessions on a Dance Floor ===
- "Get Together", original unreleased version, produced by Anders Bagge and Peer Åstrom. Dramatically different from the released album version. Leaked onto the internet in April 2008.
- "History (Land of The Free)" Completely different version from the song released as the B-side to Jump. Madonna's voice is more pure, and the song has a completely different structure. Two different demos with slightly different lyrics leaked, the first in 2007 and the second in April 2008.
- "Keep the Trance" A collaboration with Mirwais that was not used for the album. A short edit of this track that was recorded during the album sessions, leaked onto the internet in January 2008. An alternate mix (reportedly final) leaked in August 2008. The lyrics were eventually reworked and used for the Live Earth charity release "Hey You", which has very similar lyrics. The instrumental track was later reworked and used for the song "Get It Right" by Y.A.S., taken from their album Arabology, which was also produced by Mirwais.
- "(title uncertain)" Brother-in-law Joe Henry mentioned in an interview that he was working with Madonna on two songs. Only one of these collaborations (Jump), appeared on the final cut of the album. The second song may have been "Devil Wouldn't Recognize You" which Madonna developed with Henry in 2005 before re-working it with other writers for inclusion on her 2008 album Hard Candy.
- "Triggering" Another collaboration between Madonna and Mirwais. The song leaked in full on August 21, 2008. Sometimes referred to by fans as "Triggering Your Senses" due to the song's chorus. Registered ASCAP Work ID# 502697032

=== Hard Candy ===
- "Across the Sky", a reported collaboration with Justin Timberlake, Danja and Timbaland. An edited nine-second low-quality a capella clip was leaked onto the internet in 2009; the full song leaked on January 21, 2010. An earlier version leaked on September 5, 2010. Justin Timberlake sings on the chorus of both demos.
- "Animal" is another Timbaland outtake. The full song leaked onto the internet on September 6, 2010.
- "Beat Goes On (Demo)", an early version leaked onto the internet in August 2007 titled as "The Beat Goes On". It features significantly different lyrics and musical structure from the album version. The song was completely reworked after this demo leaked, and another demo with Pharrell Williams titled "Silly Girl" was supposedly incorporated into the final album version of "Beat Goes On". The Kanye West rap present in the released version was recorded after this demo leaked. The original instrumental was reworked and given to rapper Busta Rhymes, it appears as "G Stro" on the Fast & Furious soundtrack.
- "Infinity", an early version of "Give It 2 Me". The full song leaked onto the internet on September 3, 2010. It features similar lyrics, but the musical structure is completely different compared to the released version. It has been suggested that this early recording was produced by Timbaland and Timberlake, and that an alternate version with added elements also exists.
- "Latte a.k.a. Pala Tute" (aka "Lela Pala Tute", translation: The Madness of Love), a collaboration with Justin Timberlake, Timbaland and Danja. The full demo leaked onto the internet on September 7, 2010 as the incorrect title "Latte". Timbaland mentioned the song during an interview with MTV, then calling it "La La". He has also been heard describing the song as "Coffee Song". The chorus is sung in Romani and incorporates lyrics from the song "Pala Tute" by Gogol Bordello. It has been said that Timbaland misunderstood the lyrics of the chorus, erroneously assuming that it was about coffee. A final version of the song exists, with slightly different instrumentation and additional vocals by Justin Timberlake. Madonna incorporated some parts of "Pala Tute" into "La Isla Bonita" during her Live Earth performance and again on her Sticky & Sweet Tour in 2008/2009. Most file-sharing sites, lyric websites, and her fans still refer to the song as "Latte" instead of its correct title.
- "The Beat Is So Crazy", a reported collaboration with Eve and produced by Pharrell Williams. The song was originally recorded with Pharrell for Hard Candy, but was given to Eve when it didn't make the cut. Then, the song was supposed to be included on Eve's "Here I Am" album, slated to drop in 2007, but was never released due to creative differences with her label at the time, Interscope Records (which later became Madonna's label for a period). Eve sings the verses, and Madonna joins her on the hook: "The beat is so crazy / It makes me want to let go / And totally forget today / I'm better off anyway,". In addition, Pharrell makes a brief vocal cameo at the latter part of the song. The version recorded for Eve's album leaked on August 16, 2014. The original version of the song leaked in August 2015.

=== Celebration ===
- "Broken", was mentioned by Paul Oakenfold, another track recorded for the compilation. Lyrics include, "Broken like a crooked smile, a little hunched over...". Parts of the lyrics were taken from the previously released song "Miles Away". The full song leaked onto the internet on September 6, 2010. Clips of the original acoustic demo of "Broken", possibly recorded in 2007, leaked on April 19, 2011. The full acoustic demo leaked two days later. On August 25, 2011, it was announced on Madonna's official website that fans who active Platinum members or renewed their membership of Madonna's official fanclub, ICON, in 2010, would receive a limited edition 12" vinyl single of the song, including the Original Extended Mix and the Instrumental Version. The vinyl has later appeared in the official Madonna online store as available for redemption only by qualified 2010 Madonna Platinum ICON members who received a redemption coupon code.
- "It's So Cool" is a song originally written with Mirwais and Monte Pittman, CMRRA registration# 1852456 (see above). A remixed version by Paul Oakenfold appears as an iTunes-only bonus track on Madonna's greatest hits compilation Celebration. In an interview for the June 2009 Têtu Magazine, Mirwais stated that: "We still have some tracks we're supposed to do together. Especially one that I really like, a very folkish song, but her last album (Hard Candy) had a more R&B sound." It is suspected he was in fact talking about the demo "Cool Song". Mirwais was commissioned to rework this track initially recorded with Madonna for the American Life album. For the Celebration album, Madonna chose to use Oakenfold's version; however, Mirwais's 2002 and 2009 versions leaked onto the internet in full on August 31, 2010.

== 2010–19 ==
=== MDNA ===
- "Bang Bang Boom", original demo for "Gang Bang". The song contains some of the same lyrics but the composition is completely different from the album version released on MDNA. The lyrical structure of the song is somewhat altered, however, the intonation of the vocals is very different. The song leaked in full via the internet on May 14, 2012. The Priscilla Renea songwriter's demo, sung entirely by Renea herself, also leaked to the Internet some time in 2012/13.

=== Rebel Heart ===
- Thirteen demos from the album had leaked online by the night of December 16, 2014, before a title or release date had been announced. Along with the leak came false rumors of possible album titles, Iconic and Unapologetic Bitch. Snippets of the demos for "Rebel Heart" and "Wash All Over Me" leaked prior to this date some time in late November of the same year. Before the mass leak of demos, the songs "Joan of Arc", "Rebel Heart", "Wash All Over Me", and "Two Steps Behind Me" had been confirmed to have been recorded for the album by August 2014. Madonna revealed through social media that half of the leaked demos won't be released on the final version of the album, and "the other half have changed [or] evolved". Fourteen further demos were leaked to the internet on December 23, including "Back That Up (Do It)", which was eventually reworked and included as a bonus track on her 2019 album Madame X titled as Back That Up to the Beat. The demo later became viral in 2022 on the social-media platform TikTok and was officially released. Over the following day, three more demos leaked, including alternate acoustic takes of "Rebel Heart" and "Wash All Over Me". "Arioso", a demo from Music, leaked on December 25 amidst this mass leak of materials. On December 27 two more songs were leaked online, including the long-rumored "Two Steps Behind Me", which is reported to be a Lady Gaga diss track, though the claim has been denied by both Madonna and her management.

Demo leaks of November 27, 2014

1. "Rebel Heart" (snippet demo version), features rumored production by Avicii.
2. "Wash All Over Me" (snippet demo version), features rumored production by Avicii.

Demo leaks of December 16, 2014

1. "Addicted"/"The One That Got Away" (demo version of "Addicted")
2. "Bitch I'm Madonna" (demo version), this version of the song does not include a performance by Nicki Minaj.
3. "Borrowed Time" (demo version), features production by Avicii.
4. "Heartbreak City" (demo version of "HeartBreakCity"), features rumored production by Avicii.
5. "Illuminati" (demo version)
6. "Joan of Arc" (demo version)
7. "Living for Love"/"Carry On" (demo version of "Living for Love")
8. "Make the Devil Pray" (demo version of "Devil Pray")
9. "Messiah" (demo version)
10. "Rebel Heart" (full demo version), features rumored production by Avicii.
11. "Revolution"
12. "Unapologetic Bitch" (demo version)
13. "Wash All Over Me" (full demo version), features rumored production by Avicii.

Demo leaks of December 23, 2014

14. (1) "Back That Up (Do It)", features rumored production by Pharrell Williams.
15. (2) "Beautiful Scars" (demo version)
16. (3) "Best Night" (demo version)
17. (4) "Body Shop" (demo version)
18. (5) "God Is Love"
19. (6) "Graffiti Heart" (demo version)
20. (7) "Hold Tight" (demo version)
21. (8) "Iconic" (demo version), this version of the song does not include performances by Chance the Rapper or Mike Tyson.
22. (9) "Holy Water" (demo version), reported as a Natalia Kills-penned.
23. (10) "Inside Out" (demo version)
24. (11) "Veni Vidi Vici" (demo version), this version of the song does not include a performance by Nas.
25. (12) "Nothing Lasts Forever"
26. (13) "Tragic Girl"
27. (14) "Freedom"

Demo leaks of December 24, 2014

28. (15) "Rebel Heart" (alternate acoustic demo)
29. (16) "Wash All Over Me" (alternate acoustic demo)
30. (17) "S.E.X." (demo version)

Demo leaks of December 27, 2014

31. "Never Let You Go"
32. "Two Steps Behind Me"

Additional

33. "Trust No Bitch", reported as a Natalia Kills-penned.
34. "Queen"
35. "Heaven"
36. "Take a Day"
37. "Score"
- "If I Had a Hammer" appeared during the ending speech of Madonna's Rebel Heart Tour concert film. The full version of the song was never released on any album.

== 2020-29 ==
=== Confessions II ===
- "Forgive Yourself" was mentioned by Madonna in a podcast interview on an episode of On Purpose with Jay Shetty in 2025, as a companion track to "Fragile", which was inspired by the relationship she used to have with her brother Christopher Ciccone.
- "What Will Save Me" is a collaboration between Madonna, Arca and Stuart Price from the Confessions II recording sessions. Madonna briefly spoke about the song to Interview, noting that it was omitted from the track listing.
