= Trust No Bitch =

Trust No Bitch may refer to:

== Songs ==
- "Trust No Bitch", by La Goony Chonga, 2018
- "Trust No Bitch", by Latto from 777, 2022
- "Trust No Bitch", by Madonna (unreleased)
- "Trust No Bitch", by Onyx from #WakeDaFucUp, 2014
- "Trust No Bitch", by Penthouse Players Clique from Paid the Cost, 1992
- "Trust No Bitch", by Todrick Hall from Forbidden, 2018

== Television ==
- "Trust No Bitch" (Orange Is the New Black), a 2015 episode
