= List of number-one hits of 1995 (Italy) =

The list of number-one singles of 1995 in Italy includes all the songs that reached the top spot on the weekly chart compiled by the Italian music magazine Musica e Dischi. Musica e dischi also compiled a weekly albums chart in 1995, but in March of the same year, the Federation of the Italian Music Industry started its own chart, which replaced Musica e dischi's as the official Italian albums chart. Compiled by Nielsen, the first FIMI album chart included sales for the week starting on 23 February 1995. This period coincided with the first week of sales for the albums released by the 45th Sanremo Music Festival contestants, the most important music event in Italy.

== Albums ==
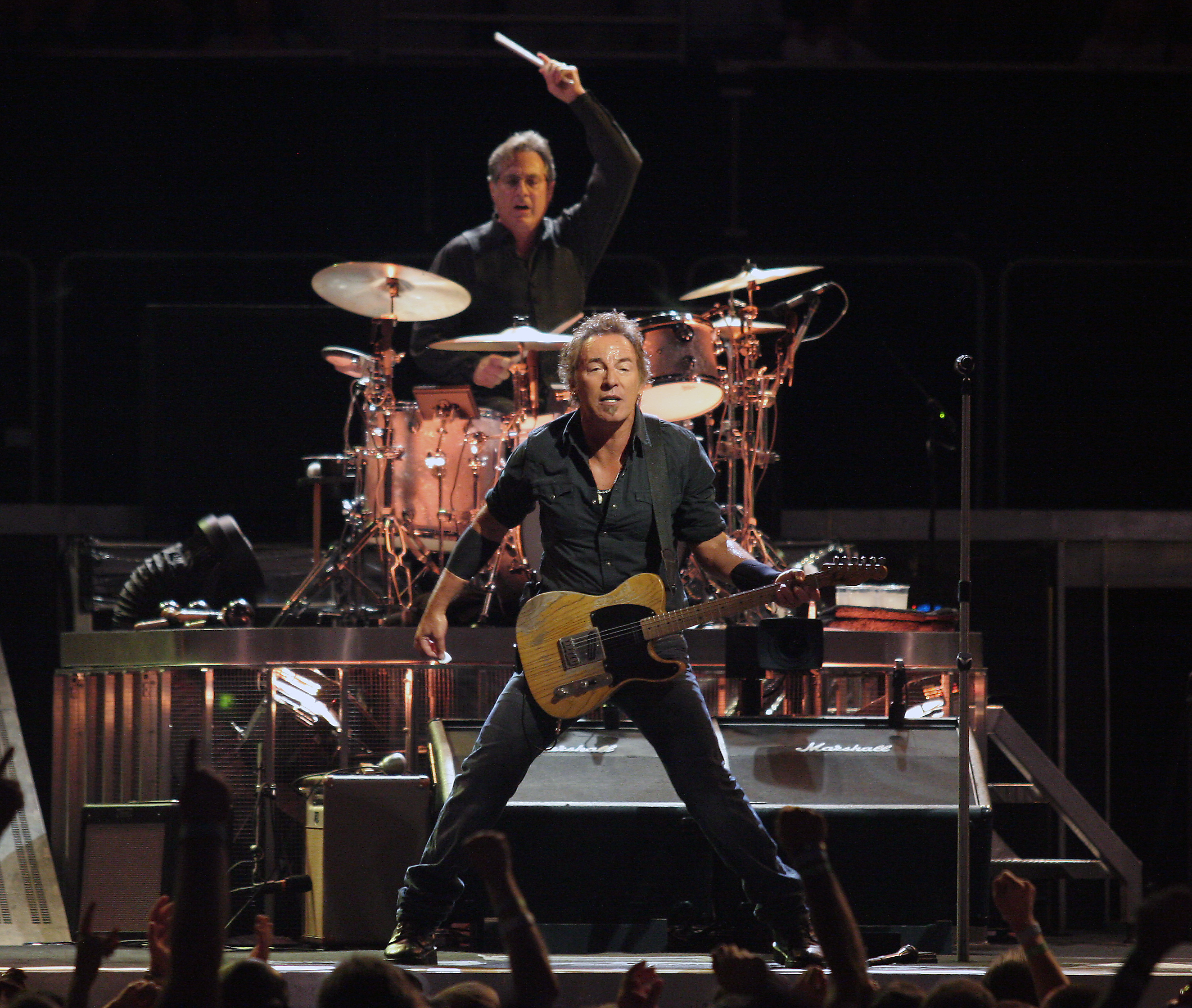
Bruce Springsteen's Greatest Hits was the first album to top the FIMI albums chart, in March 1995.

The album with the most weeks at number one on the FIMI albums chart of 1995 was 883's La donna, il sogno & il grande incubo, which spent ten weeks atop the chart. Made in Heaven by Queen and Non calpestare i fiori nel deserto by Pino Daniele spent six weeks at number one, while Zucchero's Spirito DiVino and Claudio Baglioni's Io sono qui collected four weeks in the top spot.

Musica e dischi Albums Chart
Issue date	Album	Artist(s)	Ref.
2 January	Cross Road	Bon Jovi	
9 January	Fields of Gold: The Best of Sting 1984–1994	Sting	
16 January	Fields of Gold: The Best of Sting 1984–1994	Sting	
23 January	Il cielo della vergine	Marco Masini	
30 January	Il cielo della vergine	Marco Masini	
6 February	Il cielo della vergine	Marco Masini	
13 February	Il cielo della vergine	Marco Masini	
20 February	Il cielo della vergine	Marco Masini	
27 February	Il cielo della vergine	Marco Masini	
FIMI Albums Chart
Issue date	Album	Artist(s)	Ref.
1 March	Greatest Hits	Bruce Springsteen	
8 March	Le ragazze	Neri per Caso	
15 March	Le ragazze	Neri per Caso	
22 March	Le ragazze	Neri per Caso	
29 March	Non calpestare i fiori nel deserto	Pino Daniele	
5 April	Non calpestare i fiori nel deserto	Pino Daniele	
12 April	Non calpestare i fiori nel deserto	Pino Daniele	
19 April	Non calpestare i fiori nel deserto	Pino Daniele	
26 April	Non calpestare i fiori nel deserto	Pino Daniele	
3 May	Nobody Else	Take That	
10 May	Nobody Else	Take That	
17 May	Nobody Else	Take That	
24 May	Non calpestare i fiori del deserto	Pino Daniele	
31 May	Spirito DiVino	Zucchero	
7 June	Pulse	Pink Floyd	
14 June	Spirito DiVino	Zucchero	
21 June	HIStory: Past, Present and Future, Book I	Michael Jackson	
28 June	Spirito DiVino	Zucchero	
5 July	La donna, il sogno & il grande incubo	883	
12 July	Spirito DiVino	Zucchero	
19 July	La donna, il sogno & il grande incubo	883	
26 July	La donna, il sogno & il grande incubo	883	
2 August	La donna, il sogno & il grande incubo	883	
9 August	La donna, il sogno & il grande incubo	883	
16 August	La donna, il sogno & il grande incubo	883	
23 August	La donna, il sogno & il grande incubo	883	
30 August	La donna, il sogno & il grande incubo	883	
6 September	La donna, il sogno & il grande incubo	883	
13 September	La donna, il sogno & il grande incubo	883	
20 September	Prendilo tu questo frutto amaro	Antonello Venditti	
27 September	Prendilo tu questo frutto amaro	Antonello Venditti	
4 October	Buon compleanno, Elvis!	Ligabue	
11 October	Io sono qui	Claudio Baglioni	
18 October	Io sono qui	Claudio Baglioni	
25 October	Mondo	Luca Carboni	
1 November	Io sono qui	Claudio Baglioni	
8 November	Io sono qui	Claudio Baglioni	
15 November	Made in Heaven	Queen	
22 November	Made in Heaven	Queen	
29 November	Made in Heaven	Queen	
6 December	Made in Heaven	Queen	
13 December	Made in Heaven	Queen	
20 December	Something to Remember	Madonna	
27 December	Made in Heaven	Queen	

== Singles ==
Issue date	Song	Artist(s)	Ref.
2 January	"Strange Love"	Kina	
9 January	"Song for You"	Radio Dee Jay for Christmas	
16 January	"All I Need Is Love"	Indiana	
23 January	"All I Need Is Love"	Indiana	
30 January	"All I Need Is Love"	Indiana	
6 February	"All I Need Is Love"	Indiana	
13 February	"Round and Around"	Ti.Pi.Cal.	
20 February	"Lick It"	20 Fingers	
27 February	"Lick It"	20 Fingers	
6 March	"No More I Love You's"	Annie Lennox	
13 March	"Believe"	Elton John	
20 March	"Believe"	Elton John	
27 March	"Your Loving Arms"	Billy Ray Martin	
3 April	"Baby Baby"	Corona	
10 April	"Baby Baby"	Corona	
17 April	"Baby Baby"	Corona	
24 April	"Baby Baby"	Corona	
1 May	"Baby Baby"	Corona	
8 May	"Missing"	Everything but the Girl	
15 May	"Missing"	Everything but the Girl	
22 May	"Missing"	Everything but the Girl	
29 May	"Missing"	Everything but the Girl	
5 June	"Missing"	Everything but the Girl	
12 June	"Scream"	Michael Jackson & Janet Jackson	
19 June	"Scream"	Michael Jackson & Janet Jackson	
26 June	"The Colour Inside"	Ti.Pi.Cal.	
3 July	"The Colour Inside"	Ti.Pi.Cal.	
10 July	"The Colour Inside"	Ti.Pi.Cal.	
17 July	"The Colour Inside"	Ti.Pi.Cal.	
24 July	"The Colour Inside"	Ti.Pi.Cal.	
31 July	"The Colour Inside"	Ti.Pi.Cal.	
7 August	"The Colour Inside"	Ti.Pi.Cal.	
14 August	"The Colour Inside"	Ti.Pi.Cal.	
21 August	"The Colour Inside"	Ti.Pi.Cal.	
28 August	"The Colour Inside"	Ti.Pi.Cal.	
30 August	"Wrap Me Up"	Alex Party	
5 September	"Hideaway"	De'Lacy	
12 September	"Hideaway"	De'Lacy	
19 September	"Hideaway"	De'Lacy	
26 September	"Hideaway"	De'Lacy	
3 October	"Me and You"	Alexia & Double You	
10 October	"Fairground"	Simply Red	
17 October	"Boombastic"	Shaggy	
24 October	"Boombastic"	Shaggy	
31 October	"Boombastic"	Shaggy	
7 November	"Boombastic"	Shaggy	
14 November	"Boombastic"	Shaggy	
22 November	"Boombastic"	Shaggy	
30 November	"Gangsta's Paradise"	Coolio feat. L.V.	
7 December	"Boombastic"	Shaggy	
14 December	"I Don't Wanna Be a Star"	Corona	
21 December	"Gangsta's Paradise"	Coolio feat. L.V.	
28 December	"Gangsta's Paradise"	Coolio feat. L.V.	

== See also ==
- 1995 in music
