= Purna Das Baul Samrat =

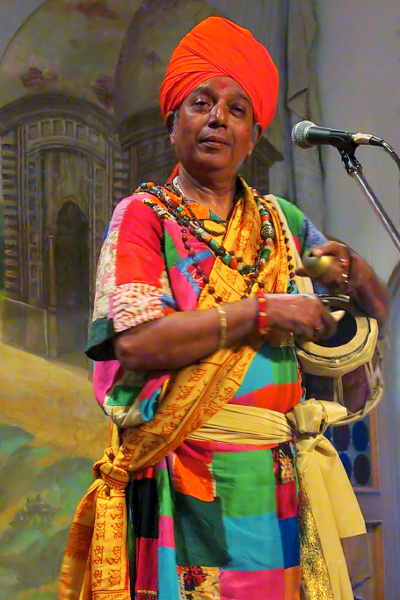

Background information
- Born: 18 March 1933 (age 93); Birbhum district, West Bengal, India
- Occupations: Baul, bard, minstrel, sacred singer, prayer leader, musician, actor
- Award: Padma Shri (2013)
- Website: www.baulsamrat.in

Puran Das Baul, popularly known as Purna Das Baul Samrat, (born 18 March 1933) is an Indian musician and singer, in Baul tradition. In 2013, The Government of India conferred upon him the Padma Shri, the country’s fourth-highest civilian award. The artist is sometimes cited as Purna Chandra Das, though 'Purna Das Baul' is used to avoid confusion with other artists and individuals with the same name. He has travelled in 140 countries, throughout the world and presented the Baul tradition.

== Family and background ==
Purna Das Baul Samrat is perceived as the successor to the once wandering mendicant minstrels, the Bauls of Bengal, a historical territory which currently is divided between People's Republic of Bangladesh and the Indian state of West Bengal, and the neighbouring Indian states of Bihar, Assam and Orissa. Das is a traditional surname among Bauls as well as in other members of the populace in this region.

Born in 1933 in Birbhum district, West Bengal, India, Purna Das Baul Samrat is the son of Nabini Das Kapha Baul and was born in the village of Ekchakka near Rampurhat in Birbhum. Purna Das's wife Manju Das Baul is both a Baul and a singer of Indian and Bengali folk songs in other traditions, and also a musicographer, principally in non-English idioms. Of Purna Das's three sons, Krishnendu Das aka BabuKishan, Subhendu ("Beautiful Moon") Bapi Das Baul, is a musician who also works in the Baul tradition while concurrently extending his music into global fusion, having lived for many years in France. Purna Das Baul Samrat's son Dibyendu Das Baul joined Purna Das Baul Samrat in the Baul Samrat's musical and liturgical troupe. His oldest son, Krishnendu Das Baul, helped his father to travel to all continents, and is himself a Baul, currently living in Canada.

Dr. Rajendra Prasad, first President of the modern state of India, acknowledged Purna Das as Baul Samrat in 1967. In this capacity, Purna Das Baul Samrat was awarded the Indian President's Award by Shri K. R. Narayan, tenth President of India, in 1999.

Purna Das has also appeared in numerous films, and was personally fêted by Mick Jagger in England, and by Bob Dylan who told Purna Das that he himself would be 'the Baul of America'. Together with his student Selina Thielemann, he authored the first book on the philosophy of the Bauls to be published in English language. In 2019, he appeared in If Not for You, a documentary about Kolkata's long lasting love affair with singer-songwriter Bob Dylan.

== Performances ==
- 2013: Baul Samrat's troupe travelled Istanbul, Konya, Turkey.
- 2012: Baul Samrat's troupe travelled Seoul, South Korea.
- 2009: Baul Samrat's troupe travelled California, USA.
- 2006: Baul Samrat's Troupe travelled Shanghai, China.
- 2005: Baul Samrat'stroupe travelled USA.
- 2004: Baul Samrat's troupe travelled Australia: Adelaide.
- 2003: Baul Samrat's troupe toured in US and CA: New York, Washington DC, Texas, California, Ontario (Toronto), September to October
- 2003: Baul Samrat's troupe toured in US: Arizona, California (University of San Diego), April
- 2002: Baul Samrat's troupe worship services at World Jain Conference in Baroda, Gujrat, Islamic Republic of Pakistan, 5 December
- 2002: Baul Samrat's troupe toured in CA: Ontario (Toronto), Quebec (Montreal), October to November
- 2002: Baul Samrat's troupe toured in US: California (San Diego, at World Music Center of Los Angeles, San Francisco), July to September
- 2002: Baul Samrat's troupe toured in US: New York, for Baba Loke Nath Mission, June
- 2002: Baul Samrat's troupe toured in US: New York, Florida, Washington, California, Michigan for Abbasuddin's birth centennial, March to April
- 2001: Baul Samrat's troupe at FOBANA Festival, Montreal, Quebec, CA, September
- 2000: Baul Samrat's troupe toured in IT: Rome, at Romaposia poetry festival, October
- 1999: Baul Samrat's troupe travelled Luxembourg.
- 1998: Baul Samrat's troupe travelled Italy in Rome, Florence, Vatican City, Milan.
- 1997: Baul Samrat's troupe travelled Canada and to the USA. He performed at Symphony Space for the World Music Institute (4/19/97)
- 1996: Baul Samrat's troupe travelled USA.
- 1994: Baul Samrat's troupe travelled Belgium (Brussels) Germany (Berlin, Koln) Norway.
- 1992: Baul Samrat's troupe travelled Dublin, Ireland.
- 1990: Baul Samrat's troupe travelled Iran.
- 1987: Baul Samrat's troupe travelled with the Rolling Stones to London, L.A., Berlin, Madrid.
- 1985: Baul Samrat's troupe travelled to USA and performed 2 concerts for the World Music Institute at Symphony Space, New York
- 1981: Baul Samrat and Manju Das travelled to USA and performed 2 concerts at the Alternative Museum (Formerly ACIA, New York. At the first concert (10/31/81) he was joined by legendary jazz flutist Herbie Mann
- 1979: Baul Samrat and Manju Das travelled to USA and performed 2 concerts at the Alternative Center for International Arts, New York. The first concert (3/31/79) was opened by poet Allen Ginsberg
- 1971: Purna Das toured England, France, Luxembourg and Rome
- 1967: Being sponsored by Albert Grossman, manager of Bob Dylan, Purna Das went on a 6 month tour to the USA, performing in 40 states. He performed with Dylan, Joan Baez, Peter Paul & Mary, and Tina Turner
- 1962: Purna Das toured the U.S.S.R. (Russia, Romania, Finland, Tuskand) for the first time at the Helsinki Youth Festival

== English language discography and bibliography ==
- Purna Chandra Das Baul: The Bengal Minstrel (Nonesuch, 1975)
- Songs of the Madmen (Kali Mandir, 1990s–2000s), CD, live recordings of Kali Mandir liturgical songs during services and pujas, Laguna Beach, California, U.S.
- Purna Das Baul & Manju Das: Bengali Folk Songs (Saregama, 1995-01-20), features Purna and Manju Das Baul.
- The Bauls of Bengal (CramWorld, 1994), CD, which is included in the Rough Guide's World Music: 100 Essential CDs.
- Spiritual Songs of India (Chhanda Dhara SP 9283), vinyl and cassette-only release, features Purna and Manju Das Baul.
- Festival of India (Music of the World CDT-121) CD and cassette release, features Purna, Manju and Krishnendu Das Baul
- Arohan (1983, motion picture directed by Shyam Benegal, starring Victor Banerjee, Noni Ganguly, Pankaj Kapur), composer

== Honors ==
- 2013 Padma Shri
- 1999 Indian President's Award presented by Shri K. R. Narayan.
- 1988 Nadamani, Baul Samrat's collective, Jagannath Temple, Puri (Oriya: ବଡଦେଉଳ, ଶ୍ରୀମନ୍ଦିର), Puri, Orissa state, IN
- 1986 Nadabramha, Baul Samrat's troupe, Puri Bhajan Festival
- 1979 C.C.I., Baul Samrat's troupe, New Delhi, IN
- 1973 (circa) Gold Medal for Baul Samrat's troupe, Satya Saibaba in Bangalore/ Bengaluru (Kannada: ಬೆಂಗಳೂರು), Karnataka state, IN
- 1968, re-releases through 2004 or later, John Wesley Harding, album by Bob Dylan, featuring Purna Das on its cover, Purna Das working with Bob Dylan & The Band
- 1967 Dr Rajendra Prasad, President of India acknowledged Purna Das as Baul Samrat in 1967
- 1958 (circa) Baul Shiromoni for Baul Samrat's troupe, Allahabad Sangit Conference
- 1952 (circa) Baul Ratno for Baul Samrat's troupe, Banaras Sangit Sanmelan
- 1945 (circa) Gold Medal for Baul Samrat's troupe, Gandhinagar Cong. Adhiveshan (Jaipur)
