= Selina Sharma =

Italian-born Indian musicologist and vocalist

- Selina Sharma delivering lecture at M.G.M. College Udupi, July 2011
- Born: 6 January 1970 (age 56)
- Other names: Selina Thielemann, Selina Goswami
- Occupations: Musicologist and singer
- Years active: 1994–present
- Spouse: Shashank Goswami (m.2006)

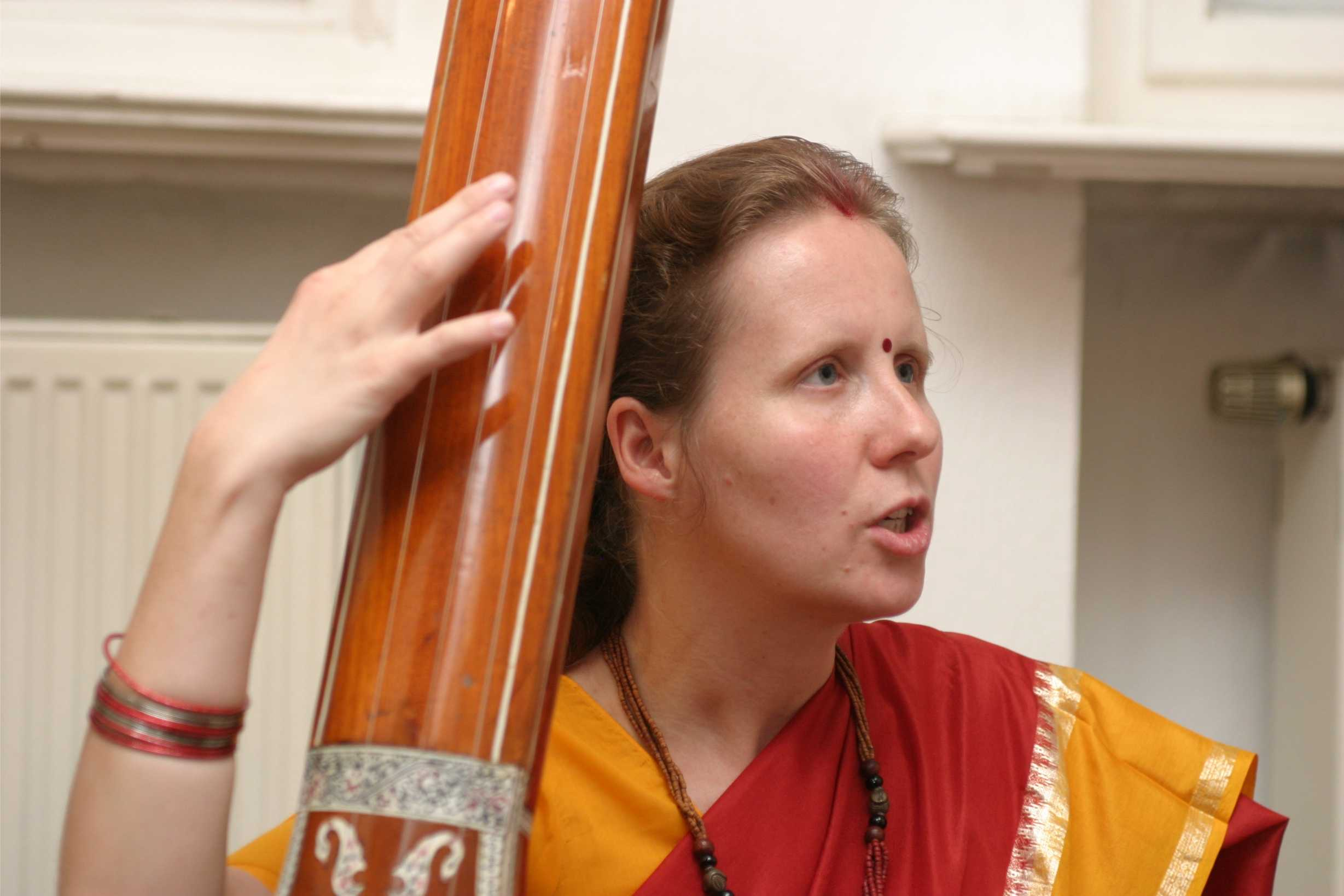
Selina Sharma in 2006

Selina Sharma (Thielemann) is an Italian-born Indian musicologist and vocalist. Her theoretical work concentrates on South Asia, in particular on the devotional music tradition of the Vraja region, the Bauls of Bengal as well as on the philosophical and spiritual aspects of music. Currently she is the Vice-Secretary and Academic Director of Vraja Kala Sanskriti Sansthana (Institute of Vraja Art and Culture) at Vrindaban.

== Early life and career (1994-2006) ==
Born as Selina Thielemann into a family of musicians and scholars, Selina Sharma was introduced to Indian culture and philosophy as a young child, inspired especially by her violinist father Peter Thielemann and her mother Serena Mitzscherling, a renowned concert pianist. Selina received training in violin from her father. After completing her schooling and musical education in Germany, she pursued her M.Mus. in ethnomusicology from the School of Oriental and African Studies, University of London, where she also studied mediaeval Hindi literature, Sanskrit and South Asian politics. She completed her M.Phil. in musicology from the University of Cambridge, and obtained her Ph.D. from Banaras Hindu University. Her doctoral thesis on "Musical traditions of Vaishnava temples in Vraja" was supervised by renowned musicologist Professor Prem Lata Sharma, who essentially shaped Selina's views. The other personality to significantly influence Selina's academic outlook was the German scholar Professor Josef Kuckertz, whose writings she compiled after his death and published them under the title Essays in Indian music in 1999.

In 1994, Selina came first to India to pursue fieldwork on the temple music traditions of the Vraja region as part of her M.Phil. thesis at the University of Cambridge. Here, she started her training as a dhrupad vocalist with Pandit Vidur Mallik at Vrindaban. Seeing the declining state of many forms of traditional music and art in the Vraja area, she returned to Vrindaban upon completion of her studies at Cambridge University in the summer of 1994, and from then onwards dedicated her work to the research and documentation of the musical traditions of Vraja and other areas in India. In the course of this work, her intent of establishing an academic institution for the research, documentation and dissemination of Vraja art took firm roots, a goal which materialized in 2004 when Vraja Kala Sanskriti Sansthana was established by a group of dedicated artists and scholars including Selina Sharma and her husband Shashank Goswami.

Between 1996 and 2005, Selina Sharma produced the major body of her publications including eleven books on various subjects of Indian music and philosophy, as well as a large number of articles. Together with the famous folk singer Purna Das Baul, she authored the first extensive written account on the philosophy of the Bauls to be published in English language.

== Dissemination of Vraja art and culture (2006-present) ==
Since 2006, Selina Sharma concentrated her activities on the dissemination of the rare and endangered forms of folk and traditional art of Vraja. Together with her husband, Sanjhi artist Shashank Goswami, she conducts regular workshops and lectures on Indian music and art, Indian stage plays on epic themes enacted by school children, as well as exhibitions of miniature paintings by young artists from Vraja in India and abroad. She also performs as a dhrupad singer in India and abroad. In 2012, Selina Sharma was honored with the Kiran Achievement Award for her contributions in the field of musicology.

== Personal life ==
Selina Sharma is married to hereditary priest and Sanjhi artist Shashank Goswami since 2006. They have two sons Shri Ram Goswami and Shri Lakshman Goswami. Selina Sharma speaks many languages, including Hindi, Sanskrit, Bengali, English, Italian and German.

== Bibliography ==
- The Darbhanga tradition: dhrupada in the school of Pandit Vidur Mallik (Varanasi: Indica Books), 1997 ISBN 81-86569-01-4
- Rasalila. A musical study of religious drama in Vraja (New Delhi: APH Publishing Corporation), 1998 ISBN 81-7024-864-7
- Sounds of the Sacred. Religious Music in India (New Delhi: APH Publishing Corporation), 1998 ISBN 81-7024-990-2
- The music of South Asia (New Delhi: APH Publishing Corporation), 1999 ISBN 81-7648-057-6
- (Edited) Essays on Indian music by Professor Josef Kuckertz (Bombay and Baroda: Indian Musicological Society), 1999
- Singing the praises divine: music in the Hindu tradition (New Delhi: APH Publishing Corporation), 2000 ISBN 81-7648-165-3
- Musical traditions of Vaishnava temples in Vraja. A comparative study of samaja and the dhrupada tradition of North Indian classical music (2 vols., New Delhi: Sagar Printers and Publishers), 2001 ISBN 81-7123-070-9
- The spirituality of music (New Delhi: APH Publishing Corporation), 2001 ISBN 81-7648-249-8
- Divine service and the performing arts in India (New Delhi: APH Publishing Corporation), 2002 ISBN 81-7648-333-8
- Samgita-sadhana. The path of human oneness (New Delhi: APH Publishing Corporation), 2003 ISBN 81-7648-474-1
- Armonie yoga. Un flusso universal di musica, poesia e filosofia che parla al cuore (Savona: Lakshmi Edizioni), 2012 ISBN 88-9664-211-6
- (with Baul Samrat Purna Das) Baul Philosophy (New Delhi: APH Publishing Corporation), 2003 ISBN 81-7648-409-1
- (with Saurabh Goswami) Music and fine arts in the devotional traditions of India. Worship through beauty (New Delhi: APH Publishing Corporation), 2005 ISBN 81-7648-811-9

== Discography ==
- Dekho gopala ki avani (Devotional songs from the temples of Vraja), produced by Vraja Kala Sanskriti Sansthana, Vrindaban, 2004
- Sañjhi Utsava vol. 1, produced by Vraja Kala Sanskriti Sansthana, Vrindaban, 2005
