= One More Chance (Madonna song) =

1996 single by Madonna

Single by Madonna

from the album Something to Remember
- B-side: "Verás"
- Released: March 11, 1996
- Recorded: September 1995
- Studio: Brooklyn
- Genre: Pop
- Length: 4:25
- Label: Maverick; Warner Bros.
- Songwriters: Madonna; David Foster
- Producers: Madonna; David Foster

Madonna singles chronology
"You'll See" (1995)	"One More Chance" (1996)	"Love Don't Live Here Anymore" (1996)

Licensed audio
- "One More Chance" on YouTube

"One More Chance" is a song by American singer Madonna for her ballads compilation album, Something to Remember (1995). Written and produced by Madonna and David Foster, it was released on March 11, 1996 by Maverick Records as the album's second single in Australia and Japan, and the third single in the European countries. An acoustic pop ballad, the song lyrically talks about attempting to win a lost lover back. The song was inspired by Madonna's real life experience, but she wrote it from the opposite point of view.

The song received praise from music critics for its musical simplicity and Madonna's vocal delivery. "One More Chance" peaked at number two in Italy and charted within the top 20 in Croatia, Finland, Israel, Scotland, and the United Kingdom. Since Madonna was busy filming the musical Evita, the song received little promotion and no accompanying music video.

== Background and writing ==
In November 1995, Madonna released a compilation album, Something to Remember, featuring a selection of her ballads over a decade of her career and three new songs. "One More Chance" was one of the new songs she composed alongside Canadian musician David Foster. It was released as the album's second single in Australia and Japan, and the third single in the European countries on March 7, 1996. The Spanish version of "You'll See", titled "Verás", appeared as the B-side of the single release. Foster initially did not expect Madonna would collaborate with him, as he believed that his music was not "really hip enough for her." Madonna and Foster worked on the song during the writing and recording session for Something to Remember, in the third weekend of September 1995.

According to biographer Barbara Victor in the book Goddess: Inside Madonna, Madonna wrote the song during her six-month vocal training with vocal coach Joan Leder in preparation of her role in the musical Evita. In a January 1996 interview with Spin magazine, Madonna said that the song was inspired by a happy moment in her life, when she gave a chance to a man she knew, and he was able to fulfill it to her needs. She reversed the situation and wrote the song. Madonna explained, "Often in my songwriting, I take things people say to me and turn them around, and put it in the first person. So it's actually something that was said to me." Madonna did not reveal the name of the person who became the main subject of the song.

== Recording and composition ==
'One More Chance'
A 26-second sample of "One More Chance" where Madonna singing the chorus over the acoustic background.

"One More Chance" was produced and arranged by Madonna and David Foster. Recording process of the song was done in Brooklyn Studios and assisted by Ronnie Rivera. It was engineered and mixed by David Reitzas, who also produced the remix of "Love Don't Live Here Anymore" for the same album. Simon Franglen provided synclavier programming for the song. Only three instruments were used for the song—acoustic guitar played Dean Parks, cello played by Suzie Katayama and keyboard played by David Foster.

"One More Chance" is an acoustic pop ballad. It is set in the time signature of common time, having a tempo of 92 beats per minute. The song is played in the key of F major, with a basic sequence of Cmaj7–Bm7–Am7–Bm7 as its chord progression, while piano and guitar are used to play the background music. Madonna's voice spans from G_{3} to B♭_{4}. The verses start off with F major and then the chorus leans towards D minor, the bridge and the ending sections changes to D major. Louis Virtel from Idolator said on the song "[Madonna] begs for forgiveness, and her only accompaniment is stark acoustic strumming." Madonna utilized her vocal lessons for Evita during the recording of "You'll See" and "One More Chance". She said "If you listen to those songs, you can hear how I was trying to absorb and utilize what I was learning for the recording of Evita."

The song begins with the sound of a finger-picked acoustic guitar, reminiscent of "More Than Words" (1991) by American rock band Extreme. The composition has an organic arrangement, devoid of any synths and sequencing, and only based on guitars and subdued strings. A number of chord changes happen throughout the song as Madonna sings the lyrics, accompanied by an interval gap after the end of each chorus with the line "if you care for me". The bridge section portrays a combination between the harmonies and the guitars, as the key changes. "One More Chance" ends with a brief pause of Madonna's solo vocals, couple of guitar chords and then it dissipates with a final strung of a major chord on the instrument.

== Critical reception ==
Ken Tucker of Entertainment Weekly wrote that "One More Chance" is just one of the "consumer enticements that just add to the allure." Billboard critic Timothy White called it "bittersweet serenade." J. D. Considine from The Baltimore Sun called the song "the album's greatest surprise". He explained, "this David Foster song is quite demanding vocally, requiring a wider range and more power than anything else on the album. Yet Madonna more than lives up to the challenge, showing enough power and polish to make even Madonna-phobes admit she can sing. Louis Virtel from music website Idolator wrote, "No other Madonna song sounds quite like it, and it holds up as a melancholic statement against grander compositions like 'You'll See' and 'I'll Remember'." J. Randy Taraborrelli, author of Madonna: An Intimate Biography, called the song, along with "You'll See", as one of "the most sombre songs [Madonna] has ever recorded." Tirzah Agassi from The Jerusalem Post felt the song is "much more shallow" than "You'll See". Adam Graham from The Detroit News called the song "a sparse acoustic ballad" on which Madonna warmed up her pre-Evita pipes.

Writing for the website TheBacklot.com in 2012, Louis Virtel ranked the song at number 84 on "The 100 Greatest Madonna Songs", saying that the song is "nothing more than a guitar and Madonna's torch-song trilling, and it's more effective than anything you've heard out of Taylor Swift's mouth in the past five years". Rikky Rooksby, author of The Complete Guide to the Music of Madonna was critical of the song. He panned the lyrics, saying they were "bland" and felt that Madonna's singing "lacked confidence and improvisation needed to make this kind of [song] really come alive". Also critical was The Guardian's Jude Rogers, who wrote that "there are better cuts on her Something to Remember anthology" and placed the song at number 62 on her ranking of Madonna's singles. Writing for Slant Magazine, Paul Schrodt opined that "due in part to her limited vocal range, Madonna’s ballads are often refreshingly understated compared to those of her contemporaries [...] on 'One More Chance' [...] however, she sounds downright pitiable".

== Chart performance ==
"One More Chance" entered the UK Singles Chart at number 11 on March 23, 1996. It dropped to number 29 in its second week and stayed on the top 100 for four weeks. According to the Official Charts Company, the single had sold 56,851 copies in the United Kingdom as of August 2008. In Australia, the song debuted at number 43 on the ARIA Singles Chart on March 24, 1996. It peaked at number 35 on the chart and stayed within the top 50 for five weeks. In Italy, "One More Chance" debuted at number ten on the FIMI Singles Chart on April 6, 1996. The next week, the single reached a peak of number two on the chart, staying there for one week before descending the chart. In Finland, the song entered the singles chart at number 14 in the 13th week of 1996. It appeared on the chart for four weeks with peak position at number 12. In Sweden, the song debuted and peaked at number 39 on March 29, 1996, staying on the chart for three weeks. Due to its weak performance in European countries, "One More Chance" only managed to peak at number 50 on the European Hot 100 Singles chart on April 13, 1996.

== Promotion and cover versions ==
Released while Madonna was busy filming the musical Evita, the song had little promotion and no official music video was shot. A montage video was shown on MTV which combined clips from the music videos for "Rain", "You'll See", I Want You", "Take a Bow" and "La Isla Bonita". Madonna has never performed the song live.

In 2000, the song was covered in Spanish by Mexican pop duo Sentidos Opuestos with the title "Hoy que no estás" (English: "Today That You're Not Here"). The Spanish lyrics were written by Donato Póveda. It was included in their fifth studio album, Movimiento perpetuo, released October 10, 2000, by EMI Latin.

== Track listings and formats ==
- UK CD single and Japanese CD maxi-single
1. "One More Chance" (Album Version) – 4:25
2. "You'll See" (Spanish Version) – 4:20
3. "You'll See" (Spanglish Version) – 4:20
- UK 7-inch and cassette single
1. "One More Chance" (Album Version) – 4:25
2. "You'll See" (Spanish Version) – 4:20

== Credits and personnel ==
Credits are adapted from the album's liner notes.

- Madonna – songwriter, producer, arranger, vocals
- David Foster – songwriter, producer, arranger, keyboards
- Simon Franglen – synclavier, programming
- Suzie Katayama – cello
- Dean Parks – acoustic guitar
- David Reitzas – engineer, mixing
- Ronnie Rivera – assistant

== Charts ==
Weekly chart performance for "One More Chance"
Chart (1996)	Peak position
Australia (ARIA)	35
Croatia (Radio Sjeverozapad)	15
Europe (Eurochart Hot 100)	50
Finland (Suomen virallinen lista)	12
Israel (Israeli Singles Chart)	8
Italy (FIMI)	2
Scottish Singles Sales (Official Charts)	12
Sweden (Sverigetopplistan)	39
UK Singles (Official Charts)	11

== Release history ==
Release dates and formats for "One More Chance"
Region	Date	Format(s)	Label(s)	Ref.
Japan	February 1996	CD single	Maverick; Warner Bros.	
Australia	March 11, 1996	CD single	Maverick; Warner Bros.	
United Kingdom	March 11, 1996	CD single	Maverick; Warner Bros.	

== Bibliography ==
- Foster, David (2009). Hitman: Forty Years Making Music, Topping the Charts, and Winning Grammys. Simon & Schuster. ISBN 978-1-4391-0306-7.
- Morton, Andrew (2002). Madonna. Macmillan Publishers. ISBN 0-312-98310-7.
- Rooksby, Rikky (2004). The Complete Guide to the Music of Madonna. Omnibus Press. ISBN 0-7119-9883-3.
- Taraborrelli, Randy J. (2002). Madonna: An Intimate Biography. Simon & Schuster. ISBN 0-7432-2880-4.
- Victor, Barbara (2013). Goddess: Inside Madonna. HarperCollins. ISBN 978-0-06-230690-6.
