= Bapi Das Baul =

Indian musician

'Bapi' Das Baul is an 8th generation Baul performer of Bengali mystical folk music. He moved from Kolkata to Paris in 1993 and is now known for his fusion work with the groups Senses, Baul Bishwa, Zap Mamma, Fun-Da-Mental, trans global underground, State Of Bengal, Studio Pagol and others in the musical scenes of Paris and London.

Bapi was taught to sing, dance, and play several instruments in his early childhood. He started singing with his parents and some baul brothers in the formation "Baul Bishwa" which means "the world of Bauls". Their concerts were invitations to discover their world, the world of ancient wandering minstrels from Bengal (India) who believe in simplicity in life and love. This philosophy is strongly reflected in their songs, that are all about love and joy. His father is Purna Das Baul Samrat, Chief Baul of Bengal.

Bapi is very faithful to his traditions and roots which are also present in his music. He uses traditional instruments on stage. On the other hand, he is always seeking for new things and improvement. In the meantime, he continued with Baul Bishwa. Since 1992 he became the leader of this project. In India nowadays Baul Bishwa is very much appreciated by the public who recognizes in Bapi a new generation, proud to perpetuate this living tradition.

== Special merits ==
One of his compositions is part of the soundtrack of Tony Gatliff's film: "Mondo". His song "Divana" was taken for a Motorola TV commercial in Europe.

== Albums ==
- "Bauls of Bengal"
- "Love and Ecstasy" for Real World (a UK-based recording company managed by pop singer Peter Gabriel)
- "Jaan Sufi"
- "6th Sense"
- "No Border"
- "Madness & happiness"
- "From Another World" : A Tribute to Bob Dylan
