= You'll See =

1995 single by Madonna

Single by Madonna

from the album Something to Remember
- B-side: "Live To Tell" (live edit)
- Released: October 23, 1995
- Recorded: September 1995
- Genre: Pop
- Length: 4:39
- Label: Maverick; Warner Bros.
- Songwriters: Madonna; David Foster; Paz Martinez (Spanish version)
- Producers: Madonna; David Foster

Madonna singles chronology
"Human Nature" (1995)	"You'll See" (1995)	"One More Chance" (1996)

Music videos
- "You'll See" on YouTube; "Verás" on YouTube

"You'll See" is a song by American singer Madonna from her ballads compilation, Something to Remember (1995). She wrote and produced the song with Canadian musician David Foster. "You'll See" was released on October 23, 1995, by Maverick Records as the lead single from the album. An acoustic pop ballad, "You'll See" features instrumentation from percussion, tremolo guitar and piano, while lyrically it speaks of independence after the end of a love affair.

The song received positive reception from contemporary critics, with reviewers praising Madonna's vocals. The American Society of Composers, Authors and Publishers (ASCAP) honored it as the Most Performed Song, in their annual ASCAP Pop Awards for 1997. "You'll See" was commercially successful, reaching the top five in Austria, Canada, Finland, Israel and the United Kingdom. The single also managed to peak at number six on the US Billboard Hot 100 making it Madonna's 29th top-ten single on the chart.

An accompanying music video was directed by Michael Haussman, where the story line served as a sequel to Madonna's music video for "Take a Bow". An alternate Spanish version, written by Argentine singer-songwriter Paz Martinez, also received a music video, and was included on the Latin American edition of Something to Remember. Madonna performed the song live on British television program Top of the Pops, and on selected US shows of 2001's Drowned World Tour. In 2009, Scottish singer Susan Boyle included a cover of the song on her debut studio album I Dreamed a Dream.

== Background and development ==
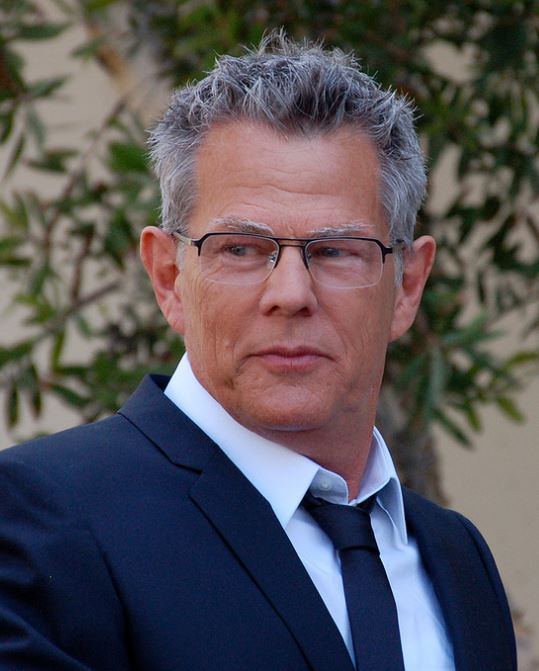
David Foster, co-writer and producer of "You'll See".

After a controversy-fueled period, Madonna's personal life had started to dominate over her musical career. "She knew it was time to make a change" as said by one anonymous member of her management team who claimed that she wanted to prove there was more to her than the constant media circus surrounding her. In November 1995, Madonna released a compilation album, Something to Remember, featuring a selection of her ballads over a decade of her career and three new songs; described as a "love letter from Madonna to her fans and music lovers alike" the compilation was targeted to emphasize the singer's musical abilities, and away from the theatrics. On the album's liner notes, Madonna further explained:

So much controversy has swirled around my career this past decade that very little attention ever gets paid to my music. The songs are all but forgotten. While I have no regrets regarding the choices I've made artistically, I've learned to appreciate the idea of doing things in a simpler way. So without a lot of fanfare, without any distractions, I present to you this collection of ballads. Some are old, some are new. All of them are from my heart.

For the new songs, Madonna worked with David Foster, a well-known producer who had worked with the likes of Barbra Streisand, Al Jarreau and Earth, Wind & Fire. Foster initially did not expect Madonna would collaborate with him, as he believed that his music would not "really [be] hip enough for her". The recording session with Foster resulted in two new songs to the final track list, "You'll See" and "One More Chance". Foster commented: "At the end of the day, the songs we did were not particularly impressive, though one of them, 'You'll See', was really great. Madonna had written a great lyric ('You think that I can't live without your love / You'll see') and I thought my music was great". The track was produced and arranged by Madonna and Foster, who worked on the song during the third weekend of September 1995.

== Recording and composition ==
"You'll See"
A 29 second sample of "You'll See". The chorus features Madonna singing over a pop rock influenced background, while saying the line "You'll See" in the end.

Recording of the song was done in Brooklyn Studios and assisted by Ronnie Rivera. It was engineered and mixed by David Reitzas, who also produced the remix of "Love Don't Live Here Anymore" for Something to Remember. Simon Franglen provided synclavier programming for the song. Only three instruments were used for the song—acoustic guitar played by Dean Parks, electric guitar played by Michael Thompson and keyboard played by Foster. A Spanish version of the song, titled "Verás", was recorded by Madonna at Gloria and Emilio Estefan's studio in Miami. The song was translated into Spanish by Paz Martinez and was included as a bonus track on the Latin American editions of Something to Remember. "You'll See" premiered on the radio forums of the official Warner Bros. Records' website on October 18, 1995, and was officially released as the album's lead single on October 23, 1995.

Musically, "You'll See" is an acoustic pop ballad. It is set in the time signature of common time, having a tempo of 90 beats per minute. The song is played in the key of E minor, with a basic sequence of Em–D–Em as its chord progression during the first half of the verse, while piano and guitar are used to play the background music. The second half of the verse expands the chord structure to Am-D-B-Em-D/C to finish the verse. The sequence shifts to Em–Am–D–G–C–F♯ during the chorus. Madonna's voice spans from G_{3} to C_{5}. Throughout the chord changes progression to give Madonna's vocals dominance in the song, and after a minute the percussion starts with a tremolo guitar added later. String synths and drums build the track further with the second verse seeing the singer harmonizing with herself. During the recording of the track, the singer used her vocal lessons for Evita; she said "If you listen to those songs, you can hear how I was trying to absorb and utilize what I was learning for the recording [of Evita]." Lyrically the song talks of independence after the end of a love affair stating that Madonna will go onto greater things. When asked if the track was about revenge, the singer replied: "No, it's about empowering yourself", but also adding that "there's another side too which is—'Don't fuck with me, I don't need anybody. I can do what I want'".

== Critical reception ==
Upon release, the song received generally positive feedback. According to Entertainment Weekly's Ken Tucker, "You'll See" is just one of the "consumer enticements that just add to the allure". J. Randy Taraborrelli, the author of Madonna: An Intimate Biography, called the song, along with "One More Chance", as one of "the most sombre songs [Madonna] has ever recorded." Billboard's Keith Caulfield opined that the track "showcased Madonna's newly-trained vocal abilities, which would prepare audiences for her lead role in the following year's Evita". AllMusic's Jose F. Promis described the song as "an empowered, somewhat melodramatic, Latin-tinged ballad that helped to even further cement Madonna as a constant on adult contemporary radio, which, in turn, further distanced her from her raunchier days earlier in the decade". Promis also praised the Spanish version "Verás"; "[Madonna] sings the Spanish lyrics surprisingly well". Similarly, online magazine Queerty called "Verás" a "pleasant and unexpected surprise". James Masterton for Dotmusic said it is "a ballad that ranks as one of the most classic singles she has ever released." Dave Simpson from Melody Maker noted its "soggy sop schmaltz". Mark Sutherland from NME complimented it as "a goodish new 'number'". Another NME editor, John Robinson, commented, "A tasteful snivel of violin announces that this is A CLASSY RECORD, RIGHT while the Spanish guitar plays delicately on the scorched savannah somewhere in the distance and the Madster bemoans her situation post-embarrassing being chucked scenario." Sal Cinquemani from Slant Magazine felt that "what [Madonna] lacks in power or range, she makes up for with nuance and feeling [...] On her 1995 hit ballad 'You’ll See' she conveys both the smoldering melodrama and stoic sorrow of a woman scorned". Billboard critic Timothy White called it a "bittersweet serenade." In another review from the publication, Larry Flick called it a "deliciously fruitful collaboration with... Foster". Flick further added in his review:

Foster's flair for musical melodrama inspires Madonna to turn in what is easily her most assured and full-bodied vocal performance to date. Amid a swirl of strings and Spanish guitars, she spews the song's declaration of romantic independence with a theatrical verve that perfectly matches the stagey, potentially overpowering tone of Foster's arrangement without flying over the heads of her youthful top 40 following. A stunning effort that could easily become the 'I Will Survive' of this generation.

In March 2023, Billboard named it the singer's 91st greatest song, calling it "far too seething and melodramatic [...] vividly real, an honest moment of self-delusion from Madonna's best era of ballads". The Huffington Post ranked the song sixth on their list of "The 13 Most Underrated Madonna Songs"; author Pandora Boxx wrote: "This song takes a sad break-up and empowers it [...] This is truly a hidden gem in the vast Madonna library". Louis Virtel, from The Backlot, placed "You'll See" at number 48 of his list "The 100 Greatest Madonna Songs". He wrote; "Madonna's declaration of independence over beautiful Spanish guitar-playing is organic and inspired". Writing for The Huffington Post, Matthew Jacobs gave the song a more negative review; "it could be credited as a curtsy to Madonna's impending Evita/Ray of Light comeback. Unfortunately, it also sounds like a dull displacement from a compilation of yearning '80s ballads". Nevertheless, he placed "You'll See" at number 69 of his list "The Definitive Ranking Of Madonna Singles". While ranking Madonna's singles in honor of her 60th birthday, The Guardian's Jude Rogers placed "You'll See" at number 52 and wrote that it "tries hard, and snags". Entertainment Weekly's Chuck Arnold called it a "dramatic precursor to Evita"; listing it as Madonna's 48th best single. For Medium's Richard LaBeau, "it never quite reaches the heights of ['Take a Bow'], but this collaboration with legendary songwriter and producer David Foster is one of her stronger ballads". The American Society of Composers, Authors and Publishers (ASCAP) honored it as the Most Performed Song, in their annual ASCAP Pop Awards for 1997.

== Chart performance ==
"You'll See" debuted on the US Billboard Hot 100 at number eight the week of December 9, 1995, selling 36,000 copies in its first-week. It became Madonna's highest debuting single at the time, following "Erotica" (number 13 in 1992) and "Rescue Me" (number 15 in 1991). The single reached a peak position of number six the following week, thus making Madonna the third act in history (after Aretha Franklin and Marvin Gaye) to have a hit peak at each position from one to ten on the chart. The track ranked at number 51 on the Billboard year end chart for 1996. It was eventually certified Gold by the Recording Industry Association of America (RIAA) on February 27, 1996, for shipments of 500,000 copies. The song also reached the top-ten of the Adult Contemporary and Mainstream Top 40 charts. Billboard ranked it at number 28 on their list of "Madonna's 40 Biggest Hits" on the Hot 100. In Canada, the song debuted at number 97 on the RPM Top Singles chart, the week of November 6, 1995. After nine weeks, on January 15, 1996, it peaked at the second position of the chart. "You'll See" also reached number one on the RPM Adult Contemporary chart.

In the United Kingdom, the song reached a peak of number five on the UK Singles Chart the week of November 4, 1995, and was present on the top 100 for a total of 14 weeks. According to the Official Charts Company, the single has sold over 305,000 physical units as of October 2010, and was certified Silver by the British Phonographic Industry (BPI). In Australia, "You'll See" peaked at number nine on the ARIA Singles Chart the week of February 18, 1996, staying in this position for two weeks and a total of eleven weeks on the chart. It also ranked at number 87 on the ARIA year-end charts for 1995, and was certified Gold by the Australian Recording Industry Association (ARIA) for shipment of 35,000 copies of the single. "You'll See" reached a peak of number two in Finland, and also reached a peak of number 13 on the Irish Singles Chart. Across Europe, the song reached a peak of number eight on the European Hot 100 Singles chart on January 27, 1996.

== Music videos, live performances and covers ==
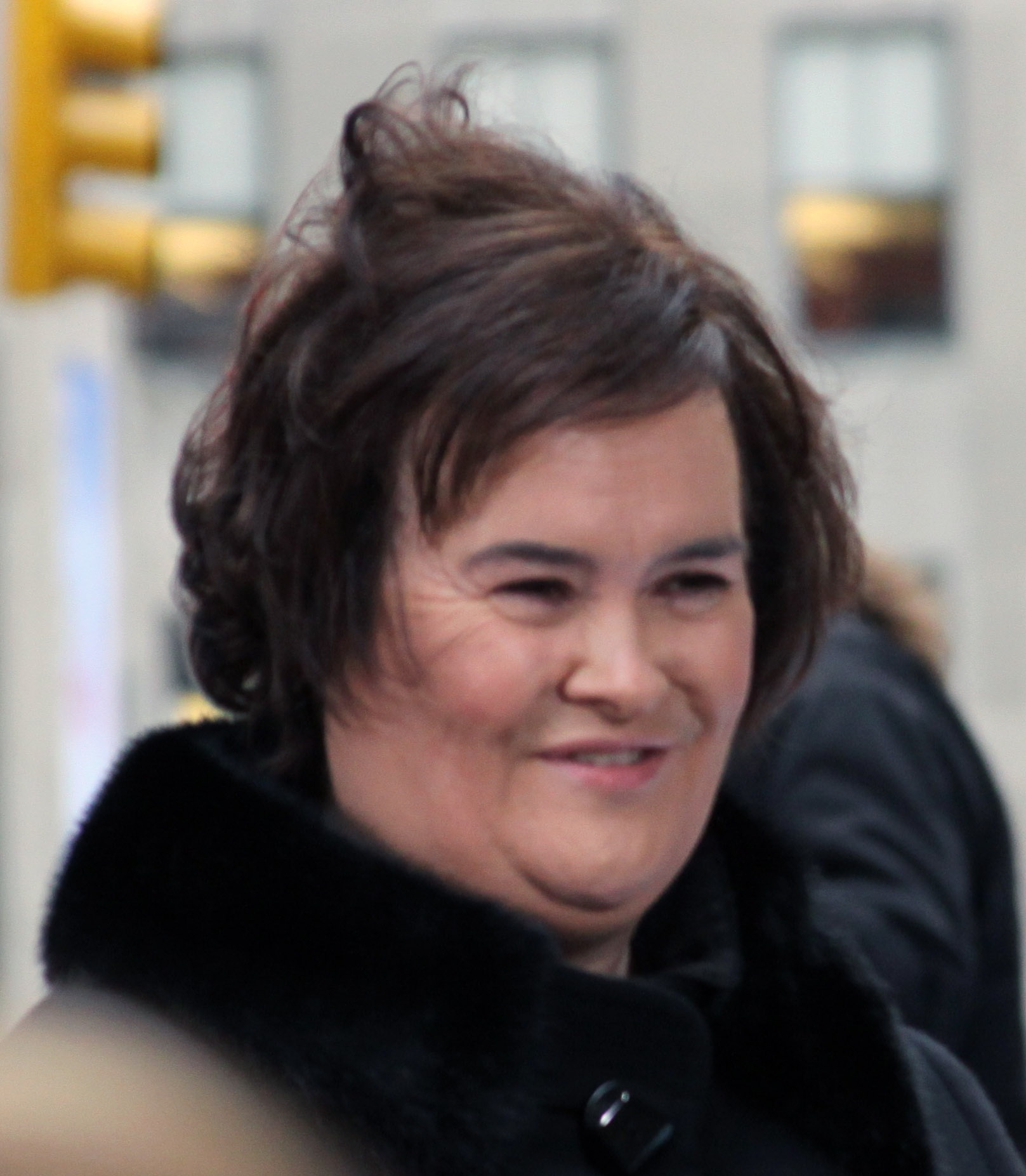
Susan Boyle included a cover of the song on her debut album I Dreamed a Dream.

The accompanying music video for "You'll See" was directed by Michael Haussman, and premiered on November 7, 1995. The video became Madonna's first sequel clip, as it followed the storyline of the singer's video for "Take a Bow", the second single from Bedtime Stories. The video for the latter had portrayed the singer being mistreated by her lover, played by Spanish Torero Emilio Muñoz. In the music video for "You'll See", Madonna walks out leaving him behind in despair. Also present are scenes of the singer riding a train and later on a plane, with Muñoz trying to catch up with her. The last frame of the video shows Madonna smiling hopefully for a better life. The video's wardrobe was styled by noted fashion editor and stylist Lori Goldstein, who had previously worked with Madonna on "Take a Bow". Another music video was created for the song's Spanish version, "Verás", which was released only in Latin America. This one intersperses scenes from the original video with footage of Madonna recording the Spanish version of the song. The music video for "You'll See" was nominated for an MTV Video Music Award for Best Cinematography in 1996. The Spanish version of the video won the MTV Latino award for Best Female Video. In 2009, the video was included on Madonna's compilation, Celebration: The Video Collection.

On November 2, 1995, Madonna performed the song on British television program Top of the Pops. Six years later, she performed "You'll See" on some US shows of her Drowned World Tour. In his review of the show at New York City's Madison Square Garden, Slant Magazine's Sal Cinquemani praised the "French-techno/acoustic revamping of the powerful 'You'll See'". The performance was not included on the tour's live video album release, Drowned World Tour 2001.

Welsh singer Shirley Bassey included a cover of the song on her 1996 album The Show Must Go On. Scottish singer Susan Boyle also covered the song for her debut album, I Dreamed a Dream (2009). Reportedly, Boyle loved the song for years, and used to sing the ballad after she failed auditions. At the end of the number Boyle, sometimes "reduced to tears", would assert "You'll see". Reviewing the album for the New York Daily News, Jim Farber felt that Boyle's voice sounded "remote and idealized" on the album, until "You'll See", where the characteristic "anger and vengeance" in her vocals "give her a harder character to chew on". The cover was included on the first episode of Brazilian telenovela Ti Ti Ti (2010). When Boyle started working on the musical I Dreamed a Dream which was based on her life, she had asked Madonna's permission to use the song onstage, but Madonna denied usage of the track.

== Track listings ==
- US 7-inch single
1. "You'll See" (LP Version) – 4:39
2. "Live To Tell" (Live Edit) – 6:22
- US CD single
1. "You'll See" (LP Version) – 4:39
2. "Live to Tell" (Live) – 8:15
3. "You'll See" (Instrumental) – 4:44
- US 12-inch and CD maxi-single
1. "You'll See" (LP Version) – 4:39
2. "You'll See" (Instrumental) – 4:44
3. "Verás/Spanish Version" – 4:21
4. "Live to Tell" (Live) – 8:15
- US CD maxi-single
1. "You'll See" (LP Version) – 4:39
2. "You'll See" (Instrumental) – 4:44
3. "Verás/Spanish Version" – 4:21
4. "Live to Tell" (Live) – 8:14
- European CD single
1. "You'll See" (Edit) – 4:15
2. "Rain" (LP Version) – 5:28
3. "You'll See" (Instrumental) – 4:44
- Digital single (2023)
1. "You'll See" (LP Version) – 4:38
2. "You'll See" (Spanglish Version 1) – 4:19
3. "You'll See" (Spanglish Version 2) – 4:19
4. "Verás/Spanish Version" – 4:21
5. "You'll See" (Edit) – 4:16
6. "You'll See" (Instrumental) – 4:42
7. "Live to Tell" (Live) – 8:15

== Credits and personnel ==
Credits are adapted from the album's liner notes.

- Madonna – songwriter, producer, arranger, vocals
- David Foster – songwriter, producer, arranger, keyboard
- Simon Franglen – synclavier, programming
- Michael Thompson - electric guitar
- Dean Parks – acoustic guitar
- David Reitzas – engineer, mixing
- Ronnie Rivera – assistant

== Charts ==
=== Weekly charts ===
Weekly chart performance for "You'll See"
Chart (1995–1996)	Peak position
Australia (ARIA)	9
Austria (Ö3 Austria Top 40)	5
Belgium (Ultratop 50 Flanders)	45
Belgium (Ultratop 50 Wallonia)	11
Canada Retail Singles (The Record)	17
Canada Top Singles (RPM)	2
Canada Adult Contemporary (RPM)	1
Canada Contemporary Hit Radio (The Record)	3
Europe (Eurochart Hot 100)	8
Europe (European Hit Radio)	4
Finland (Suomen virallinen lista)	2
France (SNEP)	24
Germany (GfK)	15
Iceland (Íslenski Listinn Topp 40)	20
Ireland (IRMA)	13
Israel (Israeli Singles Chart)	1
Italy (Musica e dischi)	6
Italy Airplay (Music & Media)	4
Netherlands (Dutch Top 40)	15
Netherlands (Single Top 100)	20
New Zealand (Recorded Music NZ)	17
Scottish Singles Sales (Official Charts)	5
Sweden (Sverigetopplistan)	6
Switzerland (Schweizer Hitparade)	8
UK Singles (Official Charts)	5
US Billboard Hot 100	6
US Adult Contemporary (Billboard)	5
US Adult Pop Airplay (Billboard)	10
US Dance Singles Sales (Billboard)	18
US Pop Airplay (Billboard)	7
US Rhythmic Airplay (Billboard)	20
US Cash Box Top 100	5

Weekly chart performance for "Verás"
Chart (1995–1996)	Peak position
Bolivia (UPI)	3
Chile (UPI)	1
El Salvador (UPI)	2
Mexico (AMPROFON)	3
Panama (UPI)	1
Spanish Airplay (Music & Media)	1
US Hot Latin Songs (Billboard)	21
Venezuela (UPI)	6

=== Year-end charts ===
1995 year-end chart performance for "You'll See"
Chart (1995)	Position
Australia (ARIA)	87
Belgium (Ultratop 50 Wallonia)	84
Europe (Eurochart Hot 100)	83
Israel (Israeli Singles Chart)	3
Netherlands (Dutch Top 40)	112
Sweden (Topplistan)	44
UK Singles (OCC)	32

1996 year-end chart performance for "You'll See"
Chart (1996)	Position
Canada Top Singles (RPM)	27
Canada Adult Contemporary (RPM)	8
Europe (Eurochart Hot 100)	74
US Billboard Hot 100	51
US Adult Contemporary (Billboard)	14
US Adult Top 40 (Billboard)	35
US Top 40/Mainstream (Billboard)	47
US Top 40/Rhythm-Crossover (Billboard)	86

== Certifications and sales ==
Certifications and sales for "You'll See"
Region	Certification	Certified units/sales
Australia (ARIA)	Gold	35,000^{^}
United Kingdom (BPI)	Silver	322,000
United States (RIAA)	Gold	500,000^{^}
^{^} Shipments figures based on certification alone.

== Release history ==
Release dates and formats for "You'll See"
Region	Date	Format(s)	Label(s)	Ref.
United Kingdom	October 23, 1995	CD single; cassette single	Maverick; Warner Bros.	
United States	October 24, 1995	Contemporary hit radio	Maverick; Warner Bros.	
Australia	November 13, 1995	CD single; cassette single	Maverick; Warner Bros.	
Japan	November 17, 1995	CD single	Maverick; Warner Bros.	

== Bibliography ==
- Foster, David (2009). Hitman: Forty Years Making Music, Topping the Charts, and Winning Grammys. Simon & Schuster. ISBN 978-1-4391-0306-7.
- Morton, Andrew (2002). Madonna. Macmillan Publishers. ISBN 0-312-98310-7.
- Rooksby, Rikky (2004). The Complete Guide to the Music of Madonna. Omnibus Press. ISBN 0-7119-9883-3.
- Ryan, Gavin (2011). Australia's Music Charts 1988–2010 (doc). Mt. Martha, VIC, Australia: Moonlight Publishing.
- Taraborrelli, Randy J. (2002). Madonna: An Intimate Biography. Simon & Schuster. ISBN 978-1-4165-8346-2.
- Whitburn, Joel (2010). Joel Whitburn's Top Pop Singles, 1955–2008. Record Research. ISBN 978-0-89820-180-2.
