= Something to Remember =

Compilation album by Madonna
- Released: November 3, 1995
- Recorded: 1984–1995
- Genre: Pop
- Length: 71:08
- Labels: Maverick; Warner Bros.
- Producers: Madonna; Nellee Hooper; David Foster (new material)

Madonna chronology
Bedtime Stories (1994)	Something to Remember (1995)	Evita (1996)

Singles from Something to Remember
- 1. "You'll See" Released: October 23, 1995; 2. "Oh Father" Released: December 27, 1995; 3. "One More Chance" Released: March 11, 1996; 4. "Love Don't Live Here Anymore" Released: March 19, 1996

Something to Remember is a compilation album by American singer and songwriter Madonna. It was released on November 3, 1995, by Maverick Records. After a controversial period in her career, she conceived a compilation of pop ballads spanning more than a decade to present a softer image to the public.

Madonna produced the new material for Something to Remember with David Foster and Nellee Hooper. She stated that the album was an attempt to make the public recognize her for her music rather than the controversies surrounding her career in the earlier part of the decade. In addition to the older songs, it included a reworked "Love Don't Live Here Anymore" and three new songs: "You'll See", "One More Chance", and "I Want You"—a cover of Marvin Gaye's 1976 single. The set contained the singles "I'll Remember" and "This Used to Be My Playground", which marked the first time both were featured on a Madonna album.

Music critics acclaimed Madonna's vocals as rich and expressive and embraced the album's gentler material and cohesiveness. "You'll See", the first of its four singles, reached number six on the US Billboard Hot 100 and the top five in four countries. "Oh Father", "One More Chance", and "Love Don't Live Here Anymore" were not as successful. Topping the charts in Australia, Austria, Estonia, Finland, Italy, and Singapore, Something to Remember garnered multi-platinum certifications across the Americas, Europe, and the Asia–Pacific region, and sold over 10 million copies worldwide.

== Background ==
American singer and songwriter Madonna issued Erotica and Sex—her fifth studio album and a coffee-table book, respectively—in October 1992. A common critique of Erotica was its sexually explicit nature; nonetheless, it received a largely positive reception. Due to its sexually explicit photographs, Sex was widely condemned by critics. (Note: Source for Sex widely being condemned and critics who condemned it:) In the erotic thriller film Body of Evidence (1993), Madonna depicted a gallery owner accused of murdering a wealthy older man after the two had sex. She then portrayed the abused wife of a filmmaker in the drama Dangerous Game (1993). Both films were released to widespread negative reception. In a highly publicized appearance on the Late Show with David Letterman in March 1994, Madonna used profanity that required broadcast censorship and handed the host a pair of her underwear while urging him to smell it.

Commentators began to question Madonna's dependence on provocative imagery following the sexually explicit releases of Sex and Erotica, in addition to her film roles and Letterman appearance. Madonna began to realize that she may have pushed her sexual image too far and felt displeased with how it began to overshadow her music. She desired to reinvent her image to remind the public that there was more to her career than the controversies surrounding it. In August 1995, Music & Media announced that Madonna was working on a greatest-hits album tentatively titled I Want You, which would consist solely of ballads, contain two new songs, and be scheduled for release around the Christmas season.

== Composition and development ==
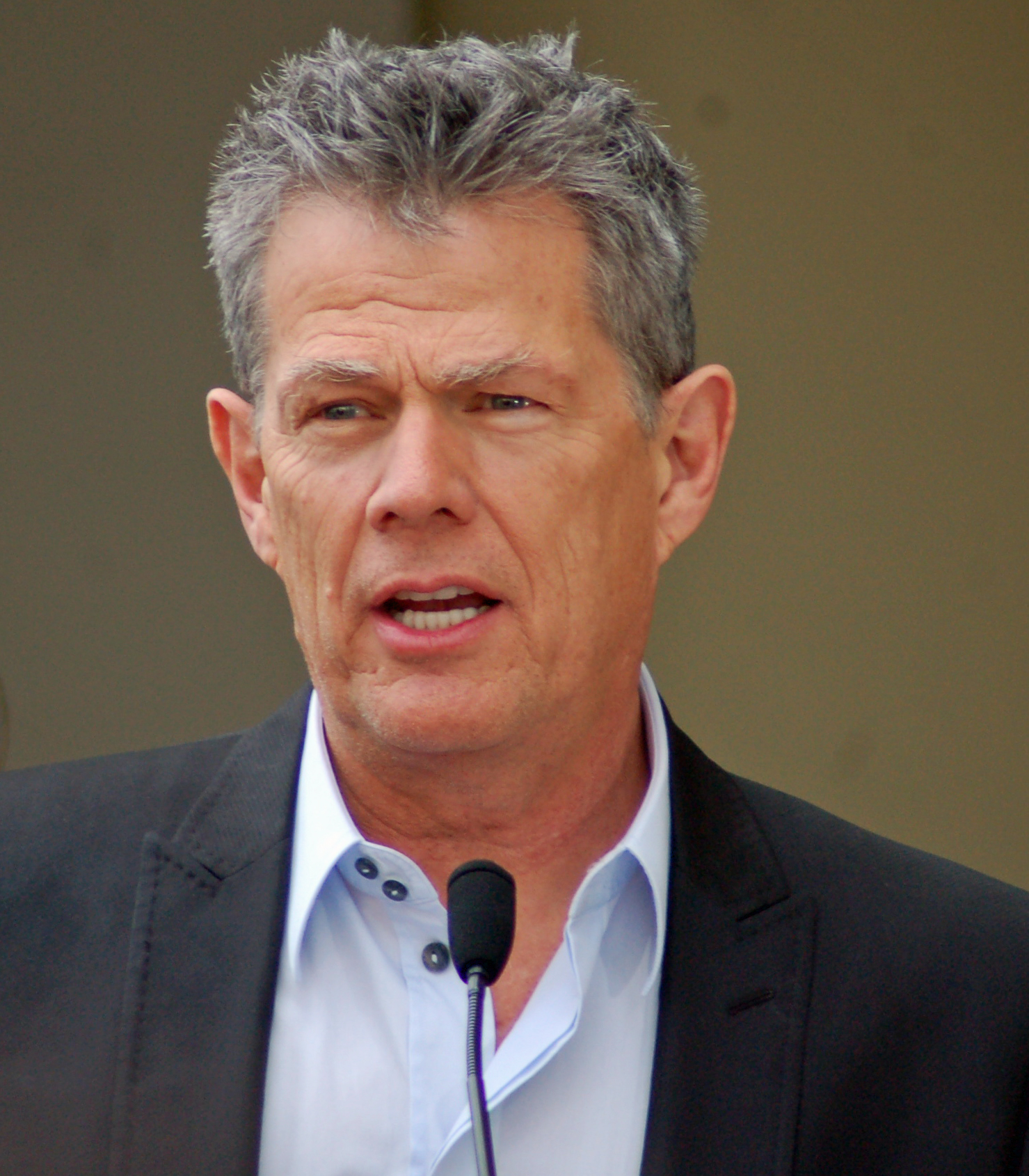
David Foster was chosen to co-write and co-produce new material for the album.

David Reitzas produced and remixed "Love Don't Live Here Anymore", a track from her second studio album, Like a Virgin (1984), for inclusion on what would eventually become Something to Remember. Madonna decided to include two soundtrack singles that were not on any of her albums: "This Used to Be My Playground" and "I'll Remember"—from A League of Their Own (1992) and With Honors (1994), respectively. Something to Remember also featured "Crazy for You" from Vision Quest (1985); "Live to Tell" from True Blue (1986); "Oh Father" from Like a Prayer (1989); "Something to Remember" from I'm Breathless (1990); "Rain" from Erotica (1992); and "Take a Bow" and "Forbidden Love" from Bedtime Stories (1994).

For the album's new material, Madonna chose to collaborate with producer David Foster, who previously worked with acts such as Barbra Streisand, Al Jarreau, and Earth, Wind & Fire. Foster was surprised to learn that Madonna wanted to work with him, as he felt his music was not "hip enough" for her. Soon after getting acquainted over dinner, the two began recording songs at his studio in Malibu, California. Their recording session resulted in two new songs for Something to Remember: "You'll See" and "One More Chance". Foster believed that the tracks were not particularly impressive. "You'll See" is a ballad with instrumentation from percussion, tremolo guitar, and synthesizers, while its lyrics express independence following the end of a romantic relationship. "One More Chance", supported by acoustic guitar, cello, and synthesizers, is a ballad about attempting to win back a lost lover.

Nellee Hooper, with whom Madonna had produced songs on Bedtime Stories (1994), suggested that she work with the trip-hop group Massive Attack to create a track for a tribute album for Marvin Gaye. The group had unsuccessfully tried to collaborate with other artists like Chaka Khan, who declined. After Madonna agreed to Hooper's suggestion to collaborate with Massive Attack, the band first sent her the music for the song. Robert Del Naja, a member of Massive Attack, later traveled to New York with Hooper, where they spent two days working in the studio. Their collaborations led to "I Want You", which features a hip-hop drum beat, strings, and layered instrumentation. Its lyrics see Madonna trying to win back a lost love. The compilation ends with an orchestral version of the song, which replaces the original rhythm section with gradually building strings, harp, and brass. Only the original version appeared on Inner City Blues: The Music of Marvin Gaye. (Note: Both versions are on Something to Remember.)

== Artwork and release ==
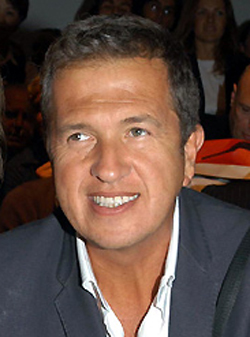
Mario Testino (pictured) shot the album's artwork.

The artwork is taken from a July 13-14, 1995 photoshoot with photographer Mario Testino. The photoshoot took place in a studio in Milan, where Madonna modelled Versace clothes for their upcoming Fall/Winter campaign. Other pictures from the shoot would appear in magazines, such as Vanity Fair, NME and Vogue Italia. The packaging included with the release showed Madonna looking "deliciously cosmopolitan" as she wore a tight-fit white cocktail attire, while the back cover artwork is predominantly more playful. The front cover artwork presented Madonna leaning against a wall with an expression of "romantic loss or absorption." Designed as the Madonna album which would appeal to a larger audience in contrast to her previous records, Bedtime Stories and Erotica, the booklet featured red roses inside and a golden yellow flower on the back cover. According to The Guardian writer Caroline Sullivan who believed that Madonna removed her nose ring for the cover shot indicated she "wants the album to be taken on its own merits." In 2013, the artwork was dubbed as one of the "20 Most Fashionable Album Covers Ever" by the Dutch edition of Elle magazine. The title of the album derives from her 1990 song of the same name since it had received little attention during the release of its original album, I'm Breathless.

Something to Remember was released in some European countries on November 3, 1995. In Madonna's native country, the album was released on November 7, 1995. In Japan, the album was released under the title Best of Madonna: Ballad Collection on November 10, 1995, containing her 1986 song "La Isla Bonita" as a bonus track. "La Isla Bonita" was re-released three months prior the compilation as a double A-side record with "Human Nature", the final single from Bedtime Stories. Receiving gold certification from the Recording Industry Association of Japan (RIAJ), the song was added to Something to Remember track listing in the hope of boosting the album sales in the region. In Latin America, the album included the bonus track "Verás", the Spanish version of "You'll See". In 2001, WEA Records released a box set of Something to Remember and The Immaculate Collection to coincide with the release of Madonna's second greatest hits package, GHV2.

== Singles ==
"I Want You" was released as a promotional single from the album on October 2, 1995. It was originally intended as the album's first single, but cancelled due to contract problems between Madonna's label and Motown Records, the copyright owner of the song. The music video for the song was directed by Earle Sebastian and was nominated for the MTV Amour category at the MTV Europe Music Awards 1996.

"You'll See" was released as the album's lead single on October 23, 1995. The song reached the top five position in Austria, Canada, Finland, Italy and the United Kingdom. The single managed to peak at number six on the Billboard Hot 100, making Madonna the third act in history (after Aretha Franklin and Marvin Gaye) to have a hit peak at each position from one to ten on the chart. An accompanying music video was directed by Michael Haussman as a sequel to Madonna's previous music video for "Take a Bow".

"Oh Father" was released as the second single for European market on December 21, 1995. It became a top ten hit in Finland and achieved top 20 placement in the United Kingdom, but charted weakly in the rest of the continent, resulting a low peak of number 62 on the European Hot 100 Singles chart.

"One More Chance" received a limited single release in Australia and several European countries on March 7, 1996. The song peaked inside the top 40 in Australia, Finland, Sweden and the United Kingdom.

"Love Don't Live Here Anymore" was released as the final single from the album on March 19, 1996. The song received poor commercial reception, peaking at number 78 on the Billboard Hot 100, while reaching the top forty in Australia and Canada. Remixes were also commissioned for the song and on June 8, 1996 it was one of the breakout tracks for the Hot Dance Music/Club Play chart reaching number 16. Its accompanying music video was directed in by Jean-Baptiste Mondino at the Confitería El Molino in Buenos Aires, Argentina, during Madonna's day off from filming Evita. It was shot in a single frame portraying Madonna in an empty suite of an abandoned hotel.

== Critical reception ==
Professional ratings
Initial reviews (in 1995/1996)
Review scores
Source	Rating
Entertainment Weekly	A
The Guardian	3/5 stars
The Post and Courier	3.5/4 stars
San Pedro News-Pilot	3.5/5 stars
Smash Hits	5/5 stars
USA Today	4/4 stars

Professional ratings
Retrospective reviews and music guides (after 1995/1996)
Review scores
Source	Rating
AllMusic	4.5/5 stars
Christgau's Consumer Guide	(dud)
Encyclopedia of Popular Music	4/5 stars
Jam!	3/5 stars
MusicHound Rock	3/5 stars
The Rolling Stone Album Guide	4/5 stars
Tom Hull – on the Web	B
The Virgin Encyclopedia of Nineties Music	4/5 stars

Something to Remember was met with critical acclaim. Stephen Thomas Erlewine from AllMusic wrote that "Throughout the album, Madonna proves that she's a terrific singer whose voice has improved over the years." He added, "Not one of the tracks is second-rate, and the best songs on Something to Remember rank among the best pop music of the '80s and '90s". Neil Strauss of The New York Times felt all the songs on the album "cohere better than a greatest-hits package would" and "they tell a story of their own, of a voice and attitude that have hardened in the dozen years that have elapsed between the bubble-gum-chomping innocence of 1983's 'Crazy for You' and the tortured torch singing of the new 'You'll See'." Ken Tucker of Entertainment Weekly commented: "By placing her greatest-hit ballads ('Live to Tell', 'Crazy for You', 'Take a Bow', etc.) in a new context—that is, separated from her more attention-getting dance music—Madonna reinvigorates them, which is just what a good best-of compilation is supposed to do. The three new songs 'You'll See', 'One More Chance', and a wonderfully eerie version of Marvin Gaye's 'I Want You' are consumer enticements that just add to the allure." Writing for About.com, Bill Lamb called it "another outstanding greatest hits collection" from Madonna's discography.

According to Greg Forman from The Post and Courier, the album shows that "There's an important difference between having a great voice and being a great singer. Whitney Houston or Mariah Carey can sing circles (and octaves) around the most famous woman on the planet, but Madonna, through sheer force of personality sells her slow numbers with a panache few modern singers can match." John Wirt from The Advocate said that the album shows that Madonna "can craft slow songs as effectively as she knocks out dance numbers" and found "an unaffected simplicity and sincerity" in her ballad singing. Writing for The Baltimore Sun, J. D. Considine believed that with the album "Madonna not only reminds us that there's more to her music than dance tunes, but also demonstrates that her voice is nowhere near as thin and chirpy as her detractors imagine." He further explained, "one of the most amazing things about the album is how sultry and assured she sounds ... The Madonna on display here not only has a richer, deeper voice than you imagined, but more interpretive insight as well."

Alwyn W. Turner in the book The Rough Guide to Rock stated that the album features "the best of her slow pieces" displaying that "Madonna had evolved over the years into an excellent ballad singer." Edna Gundersen from USA Today said that the album "flaunts the less sizzling, though equally galvanizing, highlights of her career." She was mostly impressed with Madonna's vocal and emotional power on the track "You'll See" which became "the clearest proof that the ambitious blonde is more singer than celebrity." J. Randy Taraborrelli in his book Madonna: An Intimate Biography picked the David Foster produced tracks as standouts, saying "It was interesting that, with all of his [David Foster] exciting musical ability from which to draw, he and Madonna would come up with two of the most sombre songs she has ever recorded—but such is the excitement of collaboration; one never knows what will come of it." Tirzah Agassi from The Jerusalem Post said the arrangements on the new songs "show a great leap in sophistication" and felt that Madonna "has invested much in improving her vocal technique." The Village Voice critic Robert Christgau dismissed the album with a "dud" rating, which indicates "a bad record whose details rarely merit further thought".

== Commercial performance ==
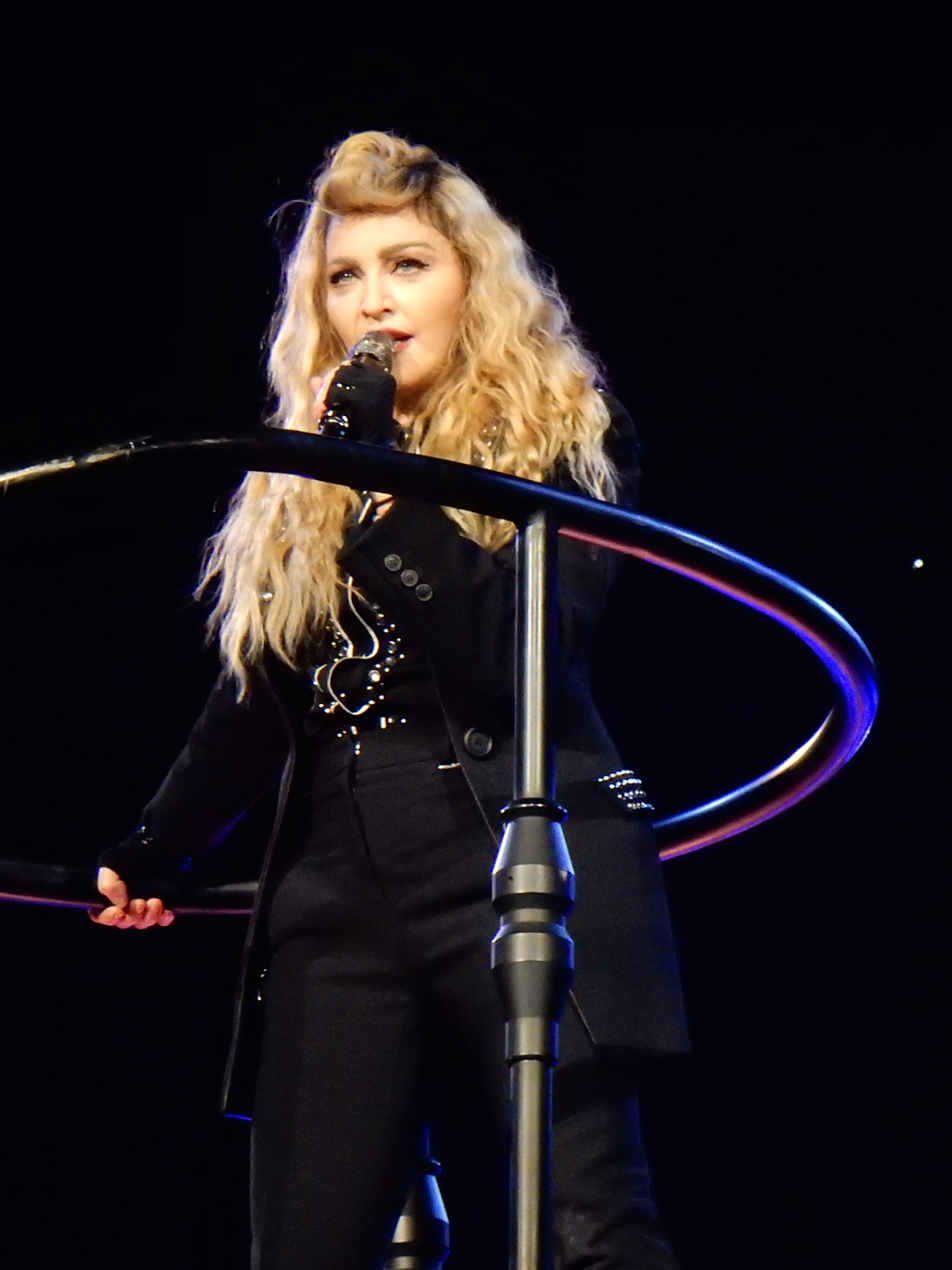
Madonna performing Something to Remember's final single, "Love Don't Live Here Anymore", on the Rebel Heart Tour

In the United States, Something to Remember debuted and peaked at number six on the Billboard 200 chart on the issue date of November 25, 1995, with 113,000 copies. It stayed on the chart for 34 weeks and was certified triple platinum by the Recording Industry Association of America (RIAA) for shipments of three million units. According to Nielsen SoundScan, the album has sold 2,102,000 copies as of December 2016. This figure does not include sales from clubs, such as BMG Music Club where the album sold an additional 179,000 copies. In Canada, the album entered the RPM Albums Chart at number two on November 20, 1995. The album held the top ten position for eight consecutive weeks before descending to number 12 on January 29, 1996. It stayed on the chart for 26 weeks, and was certified double platinum by the Music Canada (MC) for shipments of 200,000 copies.

In the United Kingdom, Something to Remember debuted at number three on the UK Albums Chart on November 18, 1995. It dropped to number four in its second and third week, spending twelve consecutive weeks in the top ten before falling to number 11 on February 2, 1996. The album was certified triple platinum by the British Phonographic Industry (BPI) for shipments of 900,000 copies. In Germany, the album reached number two on the Media Control Charts for two weeks and was certified platinum by the Bundesverband Musikindustrie (BVMI) for shipping 500,000 copies. The album also reached the top ten of the charts in other European countries and peaked at number one in Austria, Finland and Italy, where it shipped more than 500,000 copies according to the Federazione Industria Musicale Italiana (FIMI). Its commercial success in the continent allowed the album to peak at number three on the European Top 100 Albums chart. It was certified triple platinum by the International Federation of the Phonographic Industry (IFPI) for selling over three million copies across Europe.

The album was also well received commercially in Asia-Pacific territories. In Japan, the album peaked at number nine on the Oricon Albums Chart and was certified double platinum by the Recording Industry Association of Japan (RIAJ) for shipping 400,000 copies. In Australia, the album debuted at number two on November 19, 1995, and topped the record chart the following week. It stayed on the top 50 for 19 weeks and received quadruple platinum award from the Australian Recording Industry Association (ARIA) for shipments of 280,000 copies. It also became a top-ten album in New Zealand, peaking at number eight, and was certified platinum by the Recorded Music NZ (RMNZ) for shipments of 15,000 copies. Overall, the album has sold more than ten million copies worldwide.

== Legacy ==
According to Billboard, Something to Remember was a precursor to and leading example in the trend of releasing compilations of ballads. Its influence was clear in subsequent albums such as If We Fall in Love Tonight by Rod Stewart. Writing for Metro Silicon Valley, critic Gina Arnold deemed the release a "triumph", labeling it a "rare collection that has both a theme—ballads—and a measure of inspiration". She further praised her cohesive management of compilation releases up to that point, saying Madonna "is not the artist who will simply slap a bunch of hits together". Author Mark Bego also praised its theme, calling it "a beautiful album, graced with a strong unifying feeling in the ballad realm".

Timothy White from Billboard ranked Something to Remember as the fifth best album of 1995. In a poll conducted by Jornal do Brasil, it ended as the best foreign album of 1996 and Madonna as the best female foreign artist. American magazine Hits included the compilation in their 1996 list of the "Top 50 Albums of the Year". By February 1996, Something to Remember was the third best-selling folio from Warner Bros. Publications.

== Track listing ==
Something to Remember track listing
No.	Title	Writer(s)	Original album	Length
1.	"I Want You" (with Massive Attack)	Leon Ware; T-Boy Ross	New track produced by Nellee Hooper	6:23
2.	"I'll Remember" (Theme from the Motion Picture With Honors)	Madonna; Patrick Leonard; Richard Page	With Honors (1994)	4:22
3.	"Take a Bow"	Babyface; Madonna	Bedtime Stories (1994)	5:21
4.	"You'll See"	Madonna; David Foster	New track produced by Madonna and Foster	4:38
5.	"Crazy for You"	John Bettis; Jon Lind	Vision Quest (1985)	4:02
6.	"This Used to Be My Playground"	Madonna; Shep Pettibone	1992 standalone single	5:08
7.	"Live to Tell"	Madonna; Leonard	True Blue (1986)	5:51
8.	"Love Don't Live Here Anymore" (Remix)	Miles Gregory	Like a Virgin (1984)	4:53
9.	"Something to Remember"	Madonna; Leonard	I'm Breathless (1990)	5:02
10.	"Forbidden Love"	Babyface; Madonna	Bedtime Stories (1994)	4:08
11.	"One More Chance"	Madonna; Foster	New track produced by Madonna and Foster	4:27
12.	"Rain"	Madonna; Pettibone	Erotica (1992)	5:24
13.	"Oh Father"	Madonna; Leonard	Like a Prayer (1989)	4:57
14.	"I Want You" (Orchestral) (with Massive Attack)	Ware; Ross	New track produced by Hooper	6:04
Total length:				71:08

Latin American bonus track
No.	Title	Writer(s)	Original album	Length
15.	"Verás" (Spanish version of "You'll See")	Madonna; Foster; Paz Martinez	New track produced by Madonna and Foster	4:21
Total length:				75:29

Japanese bonus track
No.	Title	Writer(s)	Original album	Length
15.	"La Isla Bonita"	Madonna; Leonard; Bruce Gaitsch	True Blue (1986)	4:02
Total length:				75:10

== Personnel ==
Credits adapted from the album's liner notes.

- Madonna – producer, arranger, vocals
- Dean Chamberlain – photography
- Felipe Elgueta – assistant, assistant engineer, mixing assistant
- David Foster – producer, arranger, keyboard
- Simon Franglen – programming, synclavier
- Nellee Hooper – producer
- Suzie Katayama – cello
- Massive Attack – guest artist
- Rob Mounsey – arranger
- Jan Mullaney – keyboards
- Dean Parks – acoustic guitar
- Dave Reitzas – remix producer, engineer, mixing
- Ronnie Rivera – assistant, assistant engineer, mixing assistant
- Greg Ross – art direction, design
- Mario Testino – photography
- Michael Thompson – electric guitar
- Michael Hart Thompson – electric guitar

== Charts ==
=== Weekly charts ===
Weekly chart performance for Something to Remember
Chart (1995–1996)	Peak position
Argentine Albums (CAPIF)	2
Australian Albums (ARIA)	1
Austrian Albums (Ö3 Austria)	1
Belgian Albums (Ultratop Flanders)	9
Belgian Albums (Ultratop Wallonia)	4
Brazilian Albums (Nopem/ABPD)	4
Canada Top Albums/CDs (RPM)	2
Chilean Albums (IFPI)	3
Danish Albums (Tracklisten)	2
Dutch Albums (Album Top 100)	19
Estonian Albums (Eesti Top 10)	1
European Albums (Music & Media)	3
Finnish Albums (Suomen virallinen lista)	1
French Albums (SNEP)	6
German Albums (Offizielle Top 100)	2
Hungarian Albums (MAHASZ)	2
Irish Albums (IRMA)	7
Italian Albums (FIMI)	1
Japanese Albums (Oricon)	9
New Zealand Albums (RMNZ)	8
Norwegian Albums (VG-lista)	6
Portuguese Albums (AFP)	3
Scottish Albums (Official Charts)	6
Singapore Albums (SPVA)	1
South African Albums (RISA)	32
Spanish Albums (PROMUSICAE)	6
Swedish Albums (Sverigetopplistan)	3
Swiss Albums (Schweizer Hitparade)	3
UK Albums (Official Charts)	3
US Billboard 200	6
US Top 100 Pop Albums (Cash Box)	4

=== Year-end charts ===
1995 year-end chart performance for Something to Remember
Chart (1995)	Position
Australian Albums (ARIA)	19
Belgian Albums (Ultratop Flanders)	62
Belgian Albums (Ultratop Wallonia)	49
Canada Top Albums/CDs (RPM)	91
Swedish Albums & Compilations (Sverigetopplistan)	16
UK Albums (OCC)	11

1996 year-end chart performance for Something to Remember
Chart (1996)	Position
Australian Albums (ARIA)	28
Austrian Albums (Ö3 Austria)	15
Canada Top Albums/CDs (RPM)	28
Dutch Albums (Album Top 100)	55
European Albums (Music & Media)	14
German Albums (Offizielle Top 100)	25
Japanese Albums (Oricon)	99
Norwegian Winter Albums (VG-lista)	18
Swedish Albums & Compilations (Sverigetopplistan)	87
Swiss Albums (Schweizer Hitparade)	22
UK Albums (OCC)	64
US Billboard 200	36

== Certifications and sales ==
Sales and certifications for Something to Remember
Region	Certification	Certified units/sales
Argentina (CAPIF)	2× Platinum	120,000^{^}
Australia (ARIA)	4× Platinum	280,000^{^}
Austria (IFPI Austria)	Platinum	50,000^{*}
Belgium (BRMA)	Gold	25,000^{*}
Brazil (Pro-Música Brasil) (Note: Something to Remember is certified twice with a Gold award in Pro-Música Brasil, in 1996 and 1998, respectively)	2× Gold	200,000^{*}
Canada (Music Canada)	2× Platinum	200,000^{^}
Finland (Musiikkituottajat)	2× Platinum	93,043
France (SNEP)	2× Gold	200,000^{*}
Germany (BVMI)	Platinum	500,000^{^}
Israel	—	70,000
Italy	—	560,000
Japan (RIAJ)	2× Platinum	400,000^{^}
Netherlands (NVPI)	Platinum	100,000^{^}
New Zealand (RMNZ)	Platinum	15,000^{^}
Poland (ZPAV)	Gold	50,000^{*}
South Africa (RISA)	Gold	25,000
Spain (Promusicae)	Gold	50,000^{^}
Sweden (GLF)	Platinum	100,000^{^}
Switzerland (IFPI Switzerland)	Platinum	50,000^{^}
Taiwan (RIT)	12× Platinum	500,000
United Kingdom (BPI)	3× Platinum	900,000^{^}
United States (RIAA)	3× Platinum	2,281,000
Summaries
Europe (IFPI)	3× Platinum	3,000,000^{*}
Worldwide	—	10,000,000
^{*} Sales figures based on certification alone.^{^} Shipments figures based on certification alone.

== Release history ==
Release dates for Something to Remember
Country	Date	Format	Label
France	November 3, 1995	CD, cassette	Maverick Records, Warner Bros. Records
Germany	November 3, 1995	CD, cassette	Maverick Records, Warner Bros. Records
Italy	November 3, 1995	CD	Maverick Records, Warner Bros. Records
United Kingdom	November 6, 1995	CD	Maverick Records, Warner Bros. Records
United States	November 7, 1995	CD, cassette	Maverick Records, Warner Bros. Records
Japan	November 10, 1995	CD	Maverick Records, Warner Bros. Records
Germany	September 27, 2013	LP	Rhino Entertainment, Warner Bros. Records
United Kingdom	September 30, 2013	LP	Rhino Entertainment, Warner Bros. Records

== See also ==
- List of best-selling albums by women
- List of number-one albums in Australia during the 1990s
- List of Top 25 albums for 1995 in Australia
- List of number-one hits of 1995 (Italy)
- List of number-one hits of 1996 (Italy)
