= Madonna singles discography =

Singles by American singer

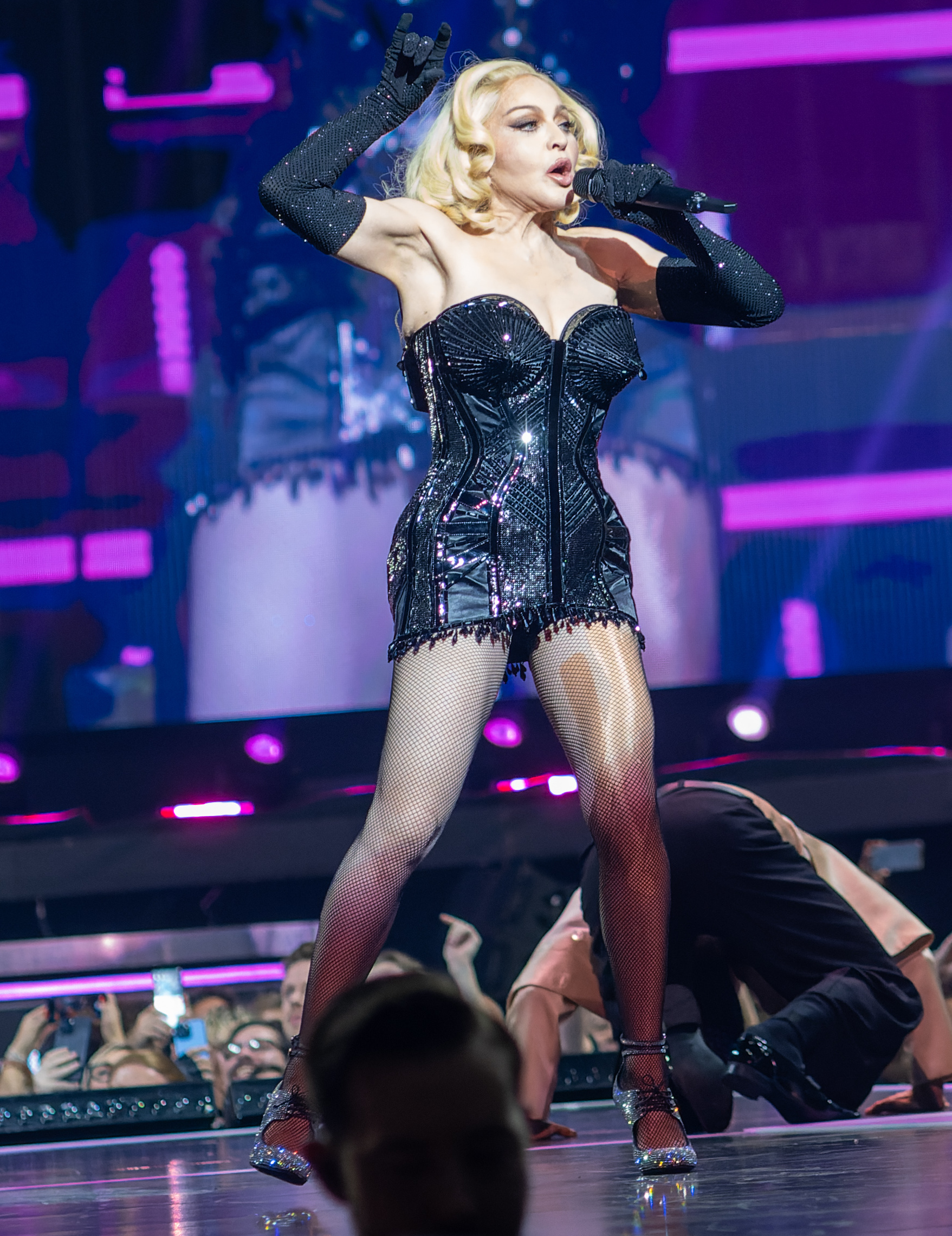
- Madonna in 2023 performing "Vogue", from her album I'm Breathless (1990). It reached number one in over 30 countries worldwide.
- Singles: 97
- Promotional singles: 29
- Other charted songs: 27

American singer Madonna has released 97 singles and 29 promotional singles and charted with 27 other songs. Among those releases, a total of 44 singles have topped the official chart in at least one of the world's top 10 music markets, from "Like a Virgin" (1984) to "Give Me All Your Luvin'" (2012). She has sold more than 100 million singles, predominantly in physical formats, with Platinum-certified titles spanning 40 years from "Holiday" (1983) to "Popular" (2023). According to Billboard, Madonna is the most successful solo artist in the US singles chart history, second overall behind the Beatles. In the UK, she is the most successful female artist, with a total of 65 top-ten songs and 13 chart-toppers according to Official Charts Company. At the 40th anniversary of the GfK Media Control Charts, Madonna was ranked as the most successful singles artist in German chart history. Editors of The New Rolling Stone Album Guide (2004) wrote that Madonna is a "deserving candidate for the title of greatest singles artist since the 1960s heyday of the single"; the staff of Slant stated in 2020 that "by every objective measure, she's the most successful singles artist of all time".

In 1982, Madonna released her debut single, "Everybody", which peaked at number three on the US Dance Club Songs chart. Her first entry on the US Billboard Hot 100 was "Holiday" (1983), which also became her first top-ten song in several countries. "Like a Virgin" (1984) became her first number-one single in Australia, Canada, and the US, while "Into the Groove" (1985) was her first number one in Italy, Spain and the UK. She continued topping the US or UK charts in the 1980s with "Live to Tell" (1986), "Papa Don't Preach" (1986), "True Blue" (1986), "Open Your Heart" (1986), "La Isla Bonita" (1987), "Who's That Girl" (1987), and "Like a Prayer" (1989). Madonna holds the record for the most consecutive top-five singles by any artist on the Billboard Hot 100, with 16 singles from "Lucky Star" (1984) to "Cherish" (1989). She surpassed Aretha Franklin as the female solo artist with the most US top-ten tracks in history, with "Keep It Together" (1990) becoming her 18th single to do so. Her next chart-toppers "Vogue" (1990), "Justify My Love" (1990), and "This Used to Be My Playground" (1992) made her the first female solo artist to achieve 10 number-one singles in the US.

"Secret" (1994) became her 35th consecutive UK top-ten single, which remains an all-time record for any act. "Take a Bow" (1994) became Madonna's longest-running US number-one single with seven weeks atop the chart, while "Frozen" (1998) became her first ever single to debut at number one in the UK. Throughout the 2000s, Madonna topped the US or UK charts with "American Pie" (2000), "Music" (2000), "Hung Up" (2005), "Sorry" (2006), and "4 Minutes" (2008). With "Hung Up", Madonna earned a place in the 2007 Guinness Book of World Records for topping the charts in the most countries (41). With "4 Minutes", Madonna surpassed Elvis Presley as the artist with the most top-ten singles in the US chart history (37). "Give Me All Your Luvin'" (2012) became her 24th number-one single in Canada and her record-extending 38th US top-ten single. "I Don't Search I Find" (2020) marked her record-extending 50th number-one song on the Dance Club Songs chart, thus making her the artist with the most number ones on a single Billboard chart, pulling ahead of George Strait who earned 44 number ones on the Hot Country Songs chart. Almost all of Madonna biggest chart successes were performed solo, with "Me Against the Music" (2003) being her first chart entry as a featured artist, while "4 Minutes" was her first single to feature another artist after a 25-year-long career.

== Singles ==
=== 1980s ===
Title	Year	Peak chart positions										Sales	Certifications	Album
Title	Year	US	US Club	AUS	CAN	FRA	GER	ITA	SPA	SWI	UK	Sales	Certifications	Album
"Everybody"	1982	— (Note: "Everybody" did not enter the Billboard Hot 100 but peaked on the Bubbling Under Hot 100 Singles chart at number seven.)	3	—	—	—	—	—	—	—	—	US: 250,000		Madonna
"Burning Up" / "Physical Attraction"	1983	—	3	13	—	—	—	—	—	—	—	US: 150,000		Madonna
"Holiday"	1983	16	1	4	32	19	9	22	—	18	2	US: 260,000; UK: 878,000	UK: Platinum; NZ: Gold	Madonna
"Lucky Star" (Note: "Lucky Star" was first released in the United Kingdom on September 9, 1983. In the United States, it was released on August 8, 1984, after the success of "Borderline".)	1983	4	1	36	8	—	—	—	—	—	14	UK: 117,470		Madonna
"Borderline"	1984	10	4	12	25	—	—	—	—	23	2	UK: 500,000	US: Gold; UK: Gold	Madonna
"Like a Virgin"	1984	1	1	1	1	8	4	16	—	9	3	WW: 6,000,000; US: 1,900,000; UK: 925,000	US: Gold; NZ: Platinum; SPA: Gold; UK: Gold	Like a Virgin
"Material Girl"	1985	2	1	4	4	47	13	18	10	15	3	US: 347,000 (digital); UK: 405,000	ITA: Gold; NZ: Platinum; SPA: Gold; UK: Platinum	Like a Virgin
"Crazy for You"	1985	1	—	1	1	47	26	12	17	16	2	US: 2,000,000 (Note: Claimed sales as of early 1990s. From 2005 to 2010, the song sold 211,000 digital copies); UK: 782,000	US: Gold; UK: Gold; NZ: Gold	Vision Quest: Original Soundtrack of the Warner Bros. Motion Picture
"Angel"	1985	5	1	1	5	—	31	—	2	17	5	UK: 205,000	US: Gold	Like a Virgin
"Into the Groove"	1985	— (Note: "Into the Groove" was not commercially released as a 7" single in North America and is not included on the US version of Like a Virgin. The track was only available as the B-side of the 12" version of "Angel" in the US, and therefore was ineligible to enter the Billboard Hot 100.)	1	1	—	2	3	1	1	2	1	CAN: 100,000; ITA: 300,000; UK: 957,000	US: Gold; UK: Platinum; ITA: Gold; FRA: Gold; NZ: Gold	Like a Virgin
"Dress You Up"	1985	5	3	5	10	18	20	16	11	20	5	UK: 210,000	UK: Silver	Like a Virgin
"Gambler"	1985	— (Note: "Gambler" was not released in the United States in 1985, hence it did not enter the Billboard Hot 100 chart. Upon its 2022 digital release, it entered the US Digital Songs chart at number 35.)	—	10	— (Note: "Gambler" did not enter the Canadian Hot 100 but entered the digital component chart at number 45.)	33	25	3	—	23	4	UK: 295,000	UK: Silver	Vision Quest: Original Soundtrack of the Warner Bros. Motion Picture
"Live to Tell"	1986	1	—	7	1	6	12	1	—	4	2	UK: 331,000	UK: Silver; FRA: Silver	True Blue
"Papa Don't Preach"	1986	1	4	1	1	3	2	1	4	2	1	UK: 651,000	US: Platinum; NZ: Gold; UK: Gold; FRA: Silver	True Blue
"True Blue"	1986	3	6	5	1	6	6	3	12	6	1	UK: 557,000	US: Gold; AUS: Platinum; UK: Silver; FRA: Silver	True Blue
"Open Your Heart"	1986	1	1	16	8	24	17	6	—	11	4	US: 75,000; UK: 195,000	UK: Silver	True Blue
"La Isla Bonita"	1987	4	—	6	1	1	1	18	8	1	1	US: 75,000; UK: 450,000	UK: Platinum; GER: Gold; ITA: Gold; FRA: Gold; NZ: Gold; SPA: Platinum	True Blue
"Who's That Girl"	1987	1	44	7	1	2	2	1	6	2	1	US: 100,000; CAN: 40,000; UK: 380,000	UK: Silver; FRA: Gold	Who's That Girl: Original Motion Picture Soundtrack
"Causing a Commotion"	1987	2	1	7	2	—	14	4	21	9	4	UK: 230,000		Who's That Girl: Original Motion Picture Soundtrack
"The Look of Love"	1987	—	—	—	—	23	34	—	—	20	9	UK: 121,439		Who's That Girl: Original Motion Picture Soundtrack
"Spotlight"	1988	— (Note: "Spotlight" was not released as a physical single in the United States, thus becoming ineligible to chart on the Billboard Hot 100 at the time. However, it peaked at number 32 on the Hot 100 Airplay chart.)	—	—	—	—	—	—	—	—	—			You Can Dance
"Like a Prayer"	1989	1	1	1	1	2	2	1	1	1	1	WW: 5,000,000; US: 2,000,000; FRA: 400,000; UK: 850,500	US: 2× Platinum; AUS: Platinum; UK: 3× Platinum; GER: Platinum; ITA: Gold; SPA: Gold; SWI: Gold; FRA: Silver; NZ: 2× Platinum	Like a Prayer
"Express Yourself"	1989	2	1	5	1	7	3	1	3	1	5	UK: 200,000	US: Gold; AUS: Gold; UK: Silver	Like a Prayer
"Cherish"	1989	2	—	4	1	21	16	3	10	10	3	UK: 200,000	AUS: Gold	Like a Prayer
"Oh Father" (Note: "Oh Father" was released in Europe on December 27, 1995, as the second single from Something to Remember.)	1989	20	—	59	14	26	—	6	—	—	16	UK: 58,730		Like a Prayer
"Dear Jessie"	1989	—	—	51	—	—	19	—	17	16	5	UK: 255,000	UK: Silver	Like a Prayer
"—" denotes a title that did not chart in that territory.

=== 1990s ===
Title	Year	Peak chart positions										Sales	Certifications	Album
Title	Year	US	US Club	AUS	CAN	FRA	GER	ITA	SPA	SWI	UK	Sales	Certifications	Album
"Keep It Together"	1990	8	1	1	8	—	—	16	—	—	—		US: Gold; AUS: 2× Platinum	Like a Prayer
"Vogue"	1990	1	1	1	1	9	4	1	1	2	1	WW: 6,000,000; US: 2,000,000 (Note: Sales as of 1990. From 2005 to 2010, the song sold 311,000 digital copies); UK: 663,000	US: 3× Platinum; AUS: 2× Platinum; ITA: Gold; UK: Platinum; CAN: Platinum; FRA: Silver; NZ: Gold	I'm Breathless: Music from the Motion Picture Dick Tracy
"Hanky Panky"	1990	10	—	6	18	—	21	4	13	15	2	UK: 210,000	US: Gold; AUS: Gold; UK: Silver	I'm Breathless: Music from the Motion Picture Dick Tracy
"Justify My Love"	1990	1	1	4	1	17	10	2	3	3	2	US: 1,000,000; UK: 275,500	US: Platinum; AUS: Gold; UK: Silver; CAN: Gold	The Immaculate Collection
"Rescue Me"	1991	9	6	15	7	21	21	12	—	11	3	UK: 134,764	US: Gold	The Immaculate Collection
"This Used to Be My Playground"	1992	1	—	9	1	7	6	1	6	6	3	UK: 275,000	US: Gold; AUS: Gold; UK: Silver	Non-album single
"Erotica"	1992	3	1	4	13	23	13	1	4	8	3	UK: 270,800	US: Gold; AUS: Gold	Erotica
"Deeper and Deeper"	1992	7	1	11	2	17	26	1	—	23	6	UK: 136,854	AUS: Gold	Erotica
"Bad Girl"	1993	36	—	32	20	44	47	3	—	25	10	UK: 74,915		Erotica
"Fever"	1993	—	1	51	—	31	—	12	—	—	6	UK: 86,077		Erotica
"Rain"	1993	14	—	5	2	—	26	9	—	11	7	UK: 130,771	AUS: Gold	Erotica
"Bye Bye Baby"	1993	—	—	15	—	—	—	7	—	28	—			Erotica
"I'll Remember"	1994	2	—	7	1	40	49	1	—	17	7	WW: 1,000,000; US: 500,000; UK: 100,090	US: Gold; AUS: Gold	With Honors: Music from the Motion Picture Soundtrack
"Secret"	1994	3	1	5	1	2	29	3	4	1	5	UK: 117,957	US: Gold; AUS: Gold; FRA: Gold	Bedtime Stories
"Take a Bow"	1994	1	—	15	1	25	18	2	—	8	16	US: 500,000; ITA: 300,000; UK: 102,739	US: Gold	Bedtime Stories
"Bedtime Story"	1995	42	1	5	42	—	—	8	—	—	4	UK: 97,428		Bedtime Stories
"Human Nature"	1995	46	2	17	64	—	50	10	—	17	8	UK: 80,685		Bedtime Stories
"You'll See"	1995	6	—	9	2	24	15	5	—	8	5	UK: 322,000	US: Gold; AUS: Gold; UK: Silver	Something to Remember
"One More Chance"	1996	—	—	35	—	—	—	2	—	—	11	UK: 56,851		Something to Remember
"Love Don't Live Here Anymore"	1996	78	16	27	24	48	—	—	—	—	— (Note: "Love Don't Live Here Anymore" did not enter the UK Singles Chart, however, after its digital re-release in 2023, the song debuted and peaked at number 61 on the download chart.)			Something to Remember
"You Must Love Me"	1996	18	—	11	11	41	78	4	—	43	10	WW: 1,100,000; ITA: 20,000 (Note: Sales report for "You Must Love Me" in Italy based in the first two days only.); UK: 90,428	US: Gold	Evita: The Motion Picture Music Soundtrack
"Don't Cry for Me Argentina"	1996	8	1	9	14	1	3	2	1	4	3	UK: 340,000	AUS: Gold; UK: Gold; GER: Gold; SWI: Gold; FRA: Gold	Evita: The Motion Picture Music Soundtrack
"Another Suitcase in Another Hall"	1997	—	—	118	—	—	—	4	—	—	7	UK: 75,233		Evita: The Motion Picture Music Soundtrack
"Frozen"	1998	2	1	5	2	2	2	1	1	2	1	US: 600,000; ITA: 30,000 (Note: Pre-ordered sales copies only.); UK: 602,200	US: Gold; AUS: Gold; UK: Platinum; GER: Platinum; ITA: Gold; SWI: Gold; FRA: Gold; NZ: Gold	Ray of Light
"Ray of Light"	1998	5	1	6	3	18	28	2	1	32	2	US: 293,000; UK: 275,000	US: Gold; AUS: Gold; UK: Gold	Ray of Light
"Drowned World/Substitute for Love"	1998	—	—	16	—	42	39	5	1	31	10	UK: 90,651		Ray of Light
"The Power of Good-Bye" (Note: "The Power of Good-Bye" was released as a dual single with "Little Star" in the United Kingdom. "The Power of Good-Bye" also charted at number 91 as a standalone single.)	1998	11	—	33	16	21	4	8	2	8	6	UK: 180,000	UK: Silver; GER: Gold	Ray of Light
"Little Star"	1998	—	—	—	—	—	—	—	—	—	6	UK: 180,000	UK: Silver	Ray of Light
"Nothing Really Matters"	1999	93	1	15	7	48	38	7	1	26	7	UK: 128,137	UK: Silver	Ray of Light
"Beautiful Stranger"	1999	19	1	5	1	17	13	1	4	6	2	UK: 535,000	AUS: Gold; UK: Platinum; FRA: Gold	Austin Powers: The Spy Who Shagged Me
"—" denotes a title that did not chart in that territory.

=== 2000s ===
Title	Year	Peak chart positions										Sales	Certifications	Album
Title	Year	US	US Club	AUS	CAN	FRA	GER	ITA	SPA	SWI	UK	Sales	Certifications	Album
"American Pie"	2000	29	1	1	4	8	1	1	1	1	1	ITA: 70,000; SPA: 35,000; UK: 400,000	AUS: Gold; UK: Gold; GER: Gold; SWI: Gold; FRA: Gold	The Next Best Thing: Music from the Motion Picture
"Music"	2000	1	1	1	1	8	2	1	1	1	1	US: 1,353,000 (Note: Figures includes digital sales (217,000 copies until 2010) and physical units (1,136,000 until 2009) according to Nielsen SoundScan.); UK: 510,000	US: Platinum; AUS: 2× Platinum; UK: Gold; GER: Gold; SWI: Gold; FRA: Gold	Music
"Don't Tell Me"	2000	4	1	7	1	16	22	1	2	10	4	UK: 185,000	US: Gold; AUS: Platinum; UK: Silver; FRA: Gold	Music
"What It Feels Like for a Girl"	2001	23	1	6	2	40	16	2	1	11	7	UK: 86,771	AUS: Gold	Music
"Die Another Day"	2002	8	1	5	1	15	4	1	1	4	3	US: 422,000 (Note: Figures includes digital sales (232,000 copies until 2013) and physical units (190,000 until August 2003) according to Nielsen SoundScan.); UK: 175,000	AUS: Gold; UK: Silver; CAN: 2× Platinum; FRA: Gold	Die Another Day / American Life
"American Life"	2003	37	1	7	1	10	10	1	2	1	2	UK: 72,260	AUS: Gold; FRA: Gold	American Life
"Hollywood"	2003	—	1	16	5	22	21	3	2	2	2	UK: 59,633		American Life
"Me Against the Music" (Britney Spears featuring Madonna)	2003	35	1	1	2	11	5	2	1	4	2	US: 341,000; UK: 240,000	US: Gold; UK: Silver; AUS: Platinum	In the Zone
"Nothing Fails"	2003	—	1	126 (Note: "Nothing Fails" was considered an EP in Australia and was only eligible for the ARIA Albums Chart. It charted at six on the ARIA Dance Albums chart in December 2003.)	7	34	36	7	1	41	—	US: 10,000 (Note: First-week sales according to Nielsen SoundScan.)		American Life
"Love Profusion"	2003	—	1	25	3	25	—	5	1	31	11	UK: 41,025		American Life
"Hung Up"	2005	7	1	1	1	1	1	1	1	1	1	WW: 5,000,000; US: 1,400,000; GER: 500,000; FRA: 500,000; ITA: 100,000; UK: 730,000	US: Platinum; AUS: Platinum; UK: 2× Platinum; GER: 3× Gold; ITA: Platinum; SPA: Gold; SWI: Gold; CAN: 2× Platinum; FRA: Gold; NZ: Platinum	Confessions on a Dance Floor
"Sorry"	2006	58	1	4	2	5	5	1	1	4	1	US: 366,000 (digital); UK: 200,000	UK: Silver; CAN: Platinum	Confessions on a Dance Floor
"Get Together"	2006	— (Note: "Get Together" did not enter the Billboard Hot 100 but entered the Bubbling Under Hot 100 Singles Chart at number six. It also peaked at number 84 on the now discontinued Pop 100 chart.)	1	13	—	23	28	2	1	16	7	ITA: 10,000; UK: 67,163		Confessions on a Dance Floor
"Jump"	2006	— (Note: "Jump" did not enter the Billboard Hot 100 but entered the Bubbling Under Hot 100 Singles Chart at number five.)	1	29	—	—	23	1	3	21	9	US: 39,000; UK: 52,038		Confessions on a Dance Floor
"Hey You"	2007	—	—	—	57	—	—	36	—	55	187			Non-album single
"4 Minutes" (featuring Justin Timberlake and Timbaland)	2008	3	1	1	1	2	1	1	1	1	1	WW: 5,000,000; US: 3,100,000; CAN: 143,000; FRA: 240,000; ITA: 77,561; UK: 627,000	US: 2× Platinum; AUS: Platinum; UK: Platinum; GER: Platinum; ITA: Gold; NZ: Platinum; SPA: 3× Platinum	Hard Candy
"Give It 2 Me"	2008	57	1	23	8	5	8	3	1	4	7	US: 316,000; ITA: 78,863; UK: 170,000	UK: Silver	Hard Candy
"Miles Away"	2008	—	2	—	23	54	11	26	1	32	39			Hard Candy
"Celebration"	2009	71	1	40	5	2	5	1	17	4	3	US: 192,000	ITA: Platinum	Celebration
"Revolver" (featuring Lil Wayne)	2009	—	4	—	47	25	—	16	39	—	130		ITA: Gold	Celebration
"—" denotes a title that did not chart in that territory.

=== 2010s ===
Title	Year	Peak chart positions										Sales	Certifications	Album
Title	Year	US	US Club	AUS	CAN	FRA	GER	ITA	SPA	SWI	UK	Sales	Certifications	Album
"Give Me All Your Luvin'" (featuring Nicki Minaj and M.I.A.)	2012	10	1	25	1	3	8	2	2	6	37	FRA: 29,816; UK: 43,750	US: Gold; ITA: Platinum	MDNA
"Girl Gone Wild"	2012	— (Note: "Girl Gone Wild" did not enter the Billboard Hot 100 but entered the Bubbling Under Hot 100 Singles chart at number six.)	1	93	42	13	—	4	7	29	73	US: 22,000 (Note: First-week sales according to Nielsen SoundScan.); UK: 3,557 (Note: First-week sales according to Official Charts Company.)	ITA: Platinum	MDNA
"Masterpiece"	2012	—	—	—	—	—	—	—	—	—	68			MDNA
"Turn Up the Radio"	2012	—	1	—	—	—	—	58	30	—	175			MDNA
"Living for Love"	2014	— (Note: "Living for Love" did not enter the Billboard Hot 100 but entered the Bubbling Under Hot 100 Singles Chart at number eight.)	1	157	92	50	40	30	21 (Note: The "Living for Love" remixes EP charted separately on the Spanish Albums chart, peaking at number 93.)	49	26	US: 41,000; FRA: 7,000; UK: 17,936 (Note: First-week sales according to Official Charts Company.)	ITA: Gold	Rebel Heart
"Ghosttown"	2015	—	1	—	—	34	34	20	41	39	117		ITA: Platinum	Rebel Heart
"Bitch I'm Madonna" (featuring Nicki Minaj)	2015	84	1	132	58	90	—	—	49	—	— (Note: "Bitch I'm Madonna" did not enter the UK Singles Chart, but entered its streaming component chart at number 73.)	US: 51,000		Rebel Heart
"Hold Tight"	2015	—	—	—	—	92	—	—	—	—	— (Note: "Hold Tight" did not enter the main chart in the United Kingdom but entered the download component chart at number 97.)			Rebel Heart
"Medellín" (with Maluma)	2019	—	1	—	— (Note: "Medellín" did not enter the Canadian Hot 100 but entered the digital component chart at number 37.)	— (Note: "Medellín" did not enter the main chart in France but entered the download component chart at number 11.)	—	37	67	69	87	US: 5,000 (Note: First-week sales according to Nielsen SoundScan.)	ITA: Gold	Madame X
"Crave" (with Swae Lee)	2019	—	1	—	—	— (Note: "Crave" did not enter the main chart in France but entered the download component chart at number 23.)	—	—	—	—	— (Note: "Crave" did not enter the main chart in the United Kingdom but entered the download component chart at number 49.)			Madame X
"I Rise"	2019	—	1	—	—	—	—	—	—	—	— (Note: "I Rise" did not enter the main chart in the United Kingdom but entered the download component chart at number 40 and the physical component chart at number 11.)			Madame X
"—" denotes a title that did not chart in that territory.

=== 2020s ===
Title	Year	Peak chart positions										Sales	Certifications	Album
Title	Year	US	US Dance (Note: Peak positions on the "Hot" dance charts: either Hot Dance/Electronic Songs or Hot Dance/Pop Songs; the latter was split from the former in 2025.)	AUS	CAN	FRA	GER	ITA	NZ	SWI	UK	Sales	Certifications	Album
"I Don't Search I Find"	2020	—	30 (Note: "I Don't Search I Find" became Madonna's last entry on the Dance Club Songs, peaking at number one. The chart was discontinued after 2020 due to the COVID-19 pandemic.)	—	—	— (Note: "I Don't Search I Find" did not enter the main chart in France but entered the download component chart at number 160.)	—	—	—	—	— (Note: "I Don't Search I Find" did not enter the main UK Singles Chart but entered the downloads component chart at number 66.)			Madame X
"Levitating" (The Blessed Madonna remix) (Dua Lipa featuring Madonna and Missy Elliott)	2020	— (Note: "Levitating" (The Blessed Madonna remix) did not enter the Billboard Hot 100 but entered the Bubbling Under Hot 100 Singles Chart at number ten, as well as a digital component chart at number 13.)	6	35	— (Note: "Levitating" (The Blessed Madonna remix) did not enter Billboard Canadian Hot 100, but entered a digital component chart at number 16.)	—	—	47	— (Note: "Levitating" (The Blessed Madonna remix) did not enter the NZ Top 40 Singles Chart, but peaked at number 9 on the NZ Hot Singles Chart.)	—	—	US: 7,000 (Note: First-week sales according to Nielsen SoundScan.)		Club Future Nostalgia
"Frozen" (Sickick remix)	2021	—	10	—	—	64	—	—	—	—	— (Note: "Frozen" (Sickick remix) did not enter the UK Singles Chart but entered digital component chart at number 39.)	US: 1,800 (Note: First-week sales according to Nielsen SoundScan.)	FRA: Gold; NZ: Gold	Non-album singles
"Break My Soul" (The Queens remix) (with Beyoncé)	2022	—	—	—	—	—	—	—	—	—	—			Non-album singles
"Back That Up to the Beat" (Demo)	2022	— (Note: "Back That Up to the Beat" did not enter the Billboard Hot 100 but entered the digital component chart at number 33.)	—	—	— (Note: "Back That Up to the Beat" did not enter Billboard Canadian Hot 100 but entered digital component chart at number 24.)	—	—	—	—	—	— (Note: "Back That Up to the Beat" did not enter the UK Singles Chart but entered digital component chart at number 14.)			Non-album singles
"Popular" (with the Weeknd and Playboi Carti)	2023	43	—	8	10	77	21	96	6	11	10	US: 4,000 (Note: First-week sales according to Nielsen SoundScan.)	US: Platinum; AUS: 3× Platinum; CAN: 5× Platinum; FRA: Platinum; GER: Gold; ITA: Platinum; NZ: 3× Platinum; SPA: Gold; UK: Platinum	The Highlights (Deluxe)
"Vulgar" (with Sam Smith)	2023	—	11	—	— (Note: "Vulgar" did not enter Billboard Canadian Hot 100, but entered a digital component chart at number 20.)	—	— (Note: "Vulgar" did not enter the main chart in Germany but entered the digital component chart at number 15.)	—	— (Note: "Vulgar" did not enter the NZ Top 40 Singles Chart, but peaked at number 21 on the NZ Hot Singles Chart.)	—	69	US: 3,000 (Note: First-week sales according to Nielsen SoundScan.)		Non-album single
"Bring Your Love" (with Sabrina Carpenter)	2026	74	7	88	51	200	—	— (Note: "Bring Your Love" did not enter the Italian Singles Chart, but debuted at number 30 on the Italian Radio Airplay Chart.)	— (Note: "Bring Your Love" did not enter the NZ Top 40 Singles Chart, but peaked at number 4 on the NZ Hot Singles Chart.)	75	29	UK: 21,785 (Note: As of July 16, 2026)		Confessions II
"Love Sensation" (solo or with Kylie Minogue)	2026	— (Note: "Love Sensation" did not enter Billboard Hot 100, but peaked at number 2 on the US Digital Song Sales Chart.)	9	61	—	—	—	—	— (Note: "Love Sensation" did not enter the New Zealand Singles Chart Top 40, but debuted at number 23 on the New Zealand Hot Singles Chart.)	—	8	UK: 19,707 (Note: Kylie Minogue Remix)		Confessions II
"Danceteria" (solo or with Charli XCX)	2026	— (Note: "Danceteria" did not enter the Billboard Hot 100 but entered the Bubbling Under Hot 100 Singles Chart at number 13.)	9	— (Note: "Danceteria" did not enter the ARIA Singles Chart top 50, but debuted at number 9 on the ARIA Dance Singles Chart.)	93	—	—	—	— (Note: "Danceteria" did not enter the New Zealand Singles Chart Top 40, but debuted at number 3 on the New Zealand Hot Singles Chart.)	—	22	UK: 23,580 (Note: As of October 2026)		Confessions II
"—" denotes a title that did not chart in that territory.

== Promotional singles ==
Title	Year	Peak chart positions										Album
Title	Year	US Club	US Dance Digital	US Latin Digital	AUS Dance	FRA Down.	GER Down.	HUN	KOR Inter Down.	SCO	UK Down.	Album
"Over and Over" (Note: Promotional 7" and 12" singles of "Over and Over", with B-side "Borderline", were released in Italy in 1985.)	1985	—	—	—	—	—	—	—	—	—	—	Like a Virgin
"Where's the Party" (Note: A promotional 7" single of "Where's the Party", with B-side "Love Don't Live Here Anymore", was released in the Philippines in 1986.)	1986	—	—	—	—	—	—	—	—	—	—	True Blue
"You Can Dance (LP Cuts)"	1987	1	—	—	—	—	—	—	—	—	—	You Can Dance
"Pray for Spanish Eyes" (Note: A promotional 7" single of "Pray for Spanish Eyes" was released in Spain in 1990.)	1990	—	—	—	—	—	—	—	—	—	—	Like a Prayer
"Erotic" (Note: Promotional CD available with the 1992 publication, Sex. This version was created at the end of the Erotica sessions and includes additional lyrics not available on the album version. These lyrics were also used in the William Orbit remixes on the "Erotica" single.)	1992	—	—	—	—	—	—	—	—	—	—	Non-album promotional single
"I Want You" (with Massive Attack)	1995	—	—	—	—	—	—	—	—	—	—	Something to Remember
"Buenos Aires" (remixes)	1997	3	—	—	—	—	—	—	—	—	—	Evita
"Sky Fits Heaven"	1998	41	—	—	—	—	—	—	—	—	—	Ray of Light
"Skin" (The Collaboration remix) (Note: A promotional CD single of The Collaboration remix of "Skin" was released in the United States on May 1, 2000. It was later made available digitally on June 5, 2025, worldwide in anticipation of release of Veronica Electronica.)	2000	—	—	—	—	—	—	—	—	—	—	Ray of Light
"Amazing" (Note: A promotional CD single of "Amazing" was released in select European territories in 2000.)	2000	—	—	—	—	—	—	—	—	—	—	Music
"Impressive Instant"	2001	1	—	—	—	—	—	—	—	—	—	Music
"GHV2 Megamix"	2001	5	—	—	—	—	—	—	—	—	—	GHV2
"Into the Hollywood Groove" (Note: A remix of "Into the Groove" and "Hollywood" featuring Missy Elliott. It was created as part of a commercial campaign for clothing retailer GAP and copies of the promotional CD were given away to customers.) (with Missy Elliott)	2003	—	—	—	—	—	—	—	—	—	—	Remixed & Revisited
"Nobody Knows Me"	2003	4	—	—	49	—	—	—	—	—	—	American Life
"Imagine" (Live) (Note: Madonna performed the cover of the John Lennon song at the Tsunami Aid: Concert of Hope in January 2005. Her performance was available as a digital download on the Sony Connect website the following day of the concert. All proceeds from the downloads went to the American Red Cross charity.)	2005	—	—	—	—	—	—	—	—	—	—	Non-album promotional single
"Mother and Father"	2005	9	—	—	—	—	—	—	—	—	—	American Life
"Broken" (Note: The song was recorded during the Celebration sessions. Madonna's official fanclub Icon's members were given a special 12" vinyl single of the track with unique artwork as a part of their membership.)	2012	—	—	—	—	—	—	—	—	—	—	Non-album promotional single
"Love Spent" (Note: A promotional CD single of "Love Spent" was released in the Netherlands in 2012.)	2012	—	—	—	—	—	—	—	157	—	—	MDNA
"Superstar"	2012	—	—	—	—	—	—	—	150	—	—	MDNA
"Future" (with Quavo)	2019	—	—	—	—	16	24	30	—	50	33	Madame X
"Dark Ballet"	2019	—	—	—	—	—	—	—	—	—	83	Madame X
"Material Gworrllllllll!" (with Saucy Santana)	2022	—	—	—	—	—	—	—	—	—	69	Non-album promotional singles
"Hung Up on Tokischa" (featuring Tokischa)	2022	—	12	8	—	—	—	—	—	—	55	Non-album promotional singles
"Sorry" (remix) (with Blond:ish, Eran Hersh and Darmon)	2023	—	— (Note: The remix of "Sorry" charted at number 39 on the Hot Dance/Electronic Songs.)	—	—	—	—	—	—	—	—	Non-album promotional singles
"Gone Gone Gone" (original demo version)	2025	—	8	—	—	—	—	—	—	—	72	Veronica Electronica
"Right on Time" (original demo edit)	2025	—	—	—	—	—	—	—	—	—	62	Bedtime Stories: The Untold Chapter
"Love Won't Wait" (original demo edit)	2025	—	—	—	—	—	—	—	—	—	44	Bedtime Stories: The Untold Chapter
"La bambola" (for Dolce & Gabbana – The One)	2026	—	—	— (Note: "La bambola" did not enter the Billboard Latin Digital Song Sales chart, but entered the Billboard World Digital Song Sales chart at number two.)	—	—	—	—	—	—	24	Non-album promotional single
"I Feel So Free"	2026	— (Note: "I Feel So Free" did not enter the US Dance Club Songs Chart, but peaked at number 1 on the US Dance Airplay Chart.)	—	—	23	—	—	—	—	—	2 (Note: "I Feel So Free" also entered the main UK Singles Chart at number 90.)	Confessions II
"—" denotes releases that did not chart in that territory.

== Other charted songs ==
Title	Year	Peak chart positions										Album
Title	Year	US Bub.	US Dance Digital	US Hol.	CAN	FIN Down.	FRA	ITA	KOR Inter Down.	NZ Hot	UK	Album
"Santa Baby"	1987	—	—	44	—	—	—	—	—	—	—	A Very Special Christmas
"Candy Shop"	2008	—	—	—	—	21	—	—	—	—	—	Hard Candy
"She's Not Me"	2008	—	—	—	—	17	—	—	—	—	—	Hard Candy
"Beat Goes On" (featuring Kanye West)	2008	— (Note: "Beat Goes On" did not enter Bubbling Under Hot 100 chart, but it peaked at number 97 on the Pop 100 chart.)	—	—	82	12	—	—	—	—	189	Hard Candy
"It's So Cool"	2009	—	—	—	—	8	—	20	—	—	107	Celebration
"Gang Bang"	2012	—	30	—	—	—	93	—	103	—	—	MDNA
"I Don't Give A" (featuring Nicki Minaj)	2012	—	—	—	—	—	—	—	126	—	—	MDNA
"I'm Addicted"	2012	—	—	—	—	—	—	—	134	—	—	MDNA
"Some Girls"	2012	—	—	—	—	—	—	—	154	—	—	MDNA
"Beautiful Killer"	2012	—	—	—	—	—	—	—	163	—	—	MDNA
"I'm a Sinner"	2012	—	—	—	—	—	—	—	175	—	—	MDNA
"Falling Free"	2012	—	—	—	—	—	—	—	181	—	—	MDNA
"I Fucked Up"	2012	—	—	—	—	—	—	—	186	—	—	MDNA
"B-Day Song" (featuring M.I.A.)	2012	—	—	—	—	—	—	—	187	—	—	MDNA
"Best Friend"	2012	—	—	—	—	—	—	—	193	—	—	MDNA
"Devil Pray"	2014	—	—	—	—	16	62	43	—	—	—	Rebel Heart
"Unapologetic Bitch"	2014	—	14	—	—	19	91	30	—	—	—	Rebel Heart
"Illuminati"	2014	—	16	—	—	20	92	30	—	—	—	Rebel Heart
"Joan of Arc"	2015	—	—	—	—	—	76	30	—	—	—	Rebel Heart
"Iconic" (featuring Chance the Rapper and Mike Tyson)	2015	—	—	—	—	30	114	40	—	—	—	Rebel Heart
"Hold Tight"	2015	—	—	—	—	—	92	36	—	—	—	Rebel Heart
"Champagne Rosé" (Quavo featuring Madonna and Cardi B)	2018	20	—	—	—	—	—	—	—	—	—	Quavo Huncho
"Super Pop"	2025	—	—	—	—	—	—	—	—	—	— (Note: "Super Pop" did not enter the UK Singles Chart, but entered the digital component chart at number 100.)	Confessions on a Dance Floor: 20 Years Edition
"Good for the Soul"	2026	—	—	—	—	—	—	—	—	9	—	Confessions II
"One Step Away"	2026	—	—	—	—	—	—	—	—	7	—	Confessions II
"Read My Lips" (with Feid)	2026	—	—	—	—	—	—	—	—	—	— (Note: "Read My Lips" did not enter the UK Singles Chart, but reached number 23 on the UK Singles Downloads Chart.)	Confessions II
"Bizarre" (with Martin Garrix)	2026	—	—	—	—	—	—	—	—	10	— (Note: "Bizarre" did not enter the UK Singles Chart, but reached number 58 on the UK Singles Downloads Chart.)	Confessions II
"—" denotes releases that did not chart in that territory.

== See also ==
- Artists with the most number-ones on the U.S. Dance Club Songs chart
- List of artists by number of Canadian number-one singles (RPM)
- List of artists by number of UK Singles Chart number ones
- List of artists who reached number one in the United States
- List of artists who reached number one on the Australian singles chart
- List of artists who reached number one on the French Singles Chart
- List of artists who reached number one on the Italian Singles Chart
- List of artists who reached number one on the Spanish Singles Chart
- List of best-selling singles in Finland
- List of best-selling singles in Japan by Western acts
- List of best-selling music artists in the United Kingdom in singles sales
- List of Romanian Top 100 number ones
