= Nothing Really Matters =

1999 single by Madonna

Single by Madonna

from the album Ray of Light
- B-side: "To Have and Not to Hold"
- Released: February 9, 1999
- Recorded: 1997
- Studio: Larrabee North; (North Hollywood, California)
- Genre: Pop; dance-pop; EDM
- Length: 4:27
- Label: Maverick; Warner Bros.
- Songwriters: Madonna; Patrick Leonard
- Producers: Madonna; William Orbit; Marius De Vries

Madonna singles chronology
"The Power of Good-Bye" / "Little Star" (1998)	"Nothing Really Matters" (1999)	"Beautiful Stranger" (1999)

Music video
- "Nothing Really Matters" on YouTube

"Nothing Really Matters" is a song by American singer Madonna for her seventh studio album, Ray of Light (1998). It was written by Madonna and Patrick Leonard, and was produced by the singer with William Orbit and Marius De Vries. The song was released as the sixth and final single from the album on February 9, 1999, by Maverick Records and Warner Bros. Records. A pop, dance-pop and EDM track on which Madonna experiments with different musical genres, "Nothing Really Matters" includes ambient music and electronic noise frequencies that were added by De Vries. Lyrically, the recording delves on the singer's first daughter Lourdes Leon. It also covers themes of selfishness, affection, and motherhood.

The song was critically appreciated for its lyrical content and composition, and was declared by reviewers as one of Madonna's most personal efforts; however, some critics felt it was tepid and lacklustre compared to other tracks from Ray of Light. In the United States, the song remains Madonna's lowest entry on the Billboard Hot 100, peaking at number 93. Its low chart peak was due to lack of airplay and the delay in releasing it in CD single formats, to which the singer's fans protested against Warner Bros. The song became her 23rd number one on the US Dance Club Play chart, reaching the top spot in Hungary and Spain, and entering the top ten in countries including Canada, Finland, Iceland, Italy, Scotland, New Zealand, and the United Kingdom.

An accompanying music video was directed by Swedish director Johan Renck, and was released on February 13, 1999. Inspired by Arthur Golden's 1997 novel Memoirs of a Geisha, the video portrays Madonna as a geisha dancing in a small room. The red kimono worn by her in the video was designed by French fashion designer Jean Paul Gaultier and worn by the singer during her performance of the song at the 41st Annual Grammy Awards. The costume and music video have been cited by journalist and academics as owing to one of Madonna's most iconic and best reinventions.

== Background and writing ==
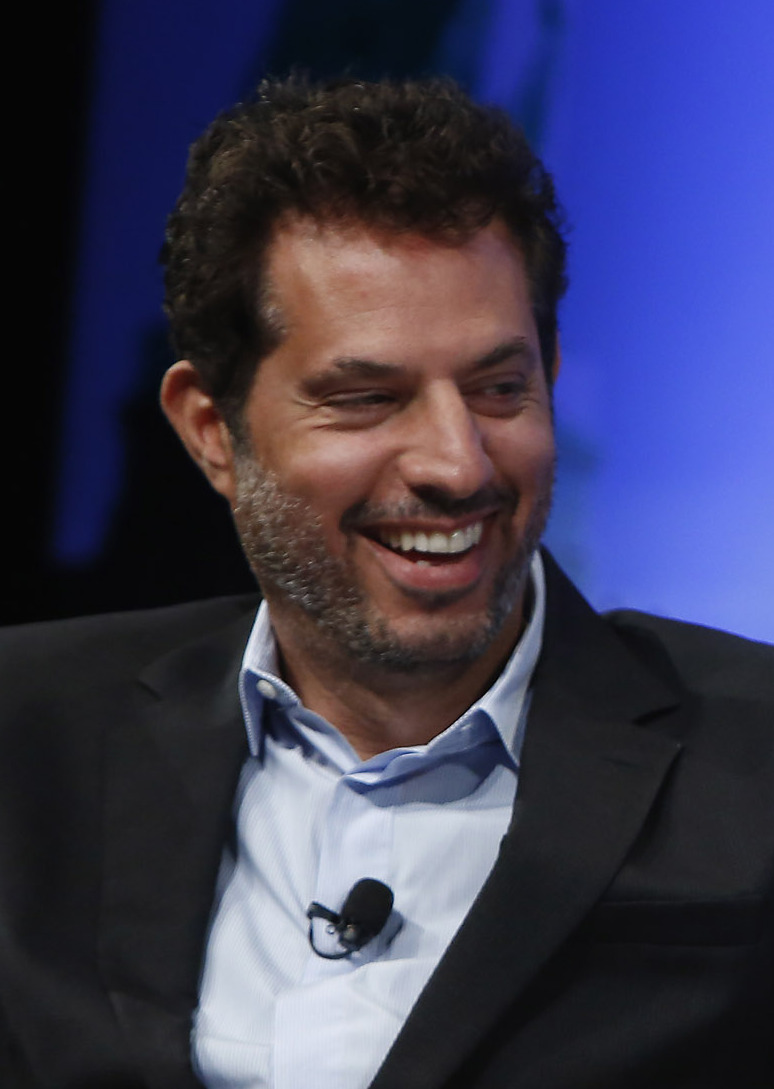
Madonna's manager Guy Oseary (pictured) organized the meeting and collaboration between Madonna and British producer William Orbit.

"Nothing Really Matters" was written by Madonna and American producer and songwriter Patrick Leonard, and was produced by herself alongside British producers William Orbit and Marius De Vries. The song was inspired by Madonna's daughter Lourdes Leon, whom she gave birth to in 1996. These events inspired a period of introspection for the singer. "That was a big catalyst for me. It took me on a search for answers to questions I'd never asked myself before," she said to Q magazine in 2002. Madonna begun writing the song with Leonard during developing her album Ray of Light. Leonard co-wrote four songs for the album, including "Nothing Really Matters". For production, Madonna desired "a certain European sensibility that I couldn’t have gotten from an American producer" such as Leonard. Her manager Guy Oseary then telephoned Orbit, and suggested that the latter send some songs to Madonna. Orbit sent a 13-track digital audio tape (DAT) to her, which included a demo version of "Nothing Really Matters"'s music. According to Madonna, she had been a fan of Orbit's work for a long time and was pleased with the demo version, which he started to work on.

De Vries, who had worked on the demo, asked Orbit to help produce the song, and was enlisted. According to Madonna: Like an Icon writer Lucy O'Brien, De Vries and Orbit had originally composed and produced the track before Ray of Light had been conceived. During the sessions, Orbit found De Vries' contribution "off-putting", to which the latter confessed, "On all the collaborations I'd left a lot of space for him, but for this I wanted to put something on the table and say, 'This is what I think'". De Vries had added electronic noise frequencies during the first chorus of the song, stating that he had a "vision on how the song should be finished". Orbit did not like the addition since it sounded to him that the "DAT's broken". De Vries defended his contribution saying that it was supposed to be "like that [...] It's quite slow for a dance tune of that nature, not a pacey tune." Madonna had enjoyed all three of their contributions to the track, and as a result, Orbit reluctantly left it on. In J. Randy Taraborrelli's book Madonna: An Intimate Biography, the singer said that the main inspiration behind "Nothing Really Matters" and "The Power of Good-Bye" from the same album, was other people judging and dissecting her creative process. Elaborating on the statement, she added,

In 'Nothing Really Matters' and 'The Power of Good-Bye', I want people to have a visceral and emotional reaction to things, rather than to have in their mind where all my stuff comes from. With the songs, I wanted to say that it does not matter really what you think or do, just think by yourself, and not judge and dissect others. You know if I see a bug crawling across the floor and it inspired me to write the most incredible love poem, I don't want people to be thinking about their relationship, and then think of my bug crawling across the floor. It's then that the power of good-bye becomes better than the power of acceptance.

== Recording and composition ==
"Nothing Really Matters" was recorded alongside the rest of the album at Larrabee North Studio in North Hollywood, California. Only three other people were in the studio with Madonna during the recording of the song and album: Orbit, recording engineer Pat McCarthy, and his assistant engineer, Matt Silva. The track featured no live instrumentation, and was part of a machinery issue that delayed initial recording as Orbit preferred working with sample loops and synth-based instrumentation. As a result, it took a while to finish production of the song, until the computers were repaired. The song was mastered by Ted Jensen at Sterling Studios in New York, and included background vocals from Donna De Lory and Niki Haris.

"Nothing Really Matters"
A 26 second sample of "Nothing Really Matters" where the chorus can be heard, backed by the ambient music and dance beats. Towards the end of the sample the cursory bleeping can be heard from the right to the left.

"Nothing Really Matters" is a mid-tempo pop, dance-pop and EDM song which contains influences of techno, downtempo pop, and house music. It is set in time signature of common time, and is composed in the key of F major, with a moderate tempo of 117 beats per minute. Madonna's vocals range from the lower octave of F_{3} to the higher note of A♭_{4}. Greg Kot from the Chicago Tribune labelled the production as a "worldly, and weary Madonna". David Browne from Entertainment Weekly noticed that the "hard-step beats and synth washes make the romantic-physical yearnings (and hooks) of 'Skin' and 'Nothing Really Matters' even tauter [...]". J.D. Considine from The Baltimore Sun felt the song was a "smart, groove-intensive tune". Chuck Taylor from Billboard compared the composition of "Nothing Really Matters" to the "disco-encrusted" "Vogue" (1990). However, he found that the "core" important part of the song was its "sweetly-spiritual" and "simple" lyrical content.

The song begins with a "strange, electronic, slightly broken noise" that spans between the start of the song up until 54 seconds. The ambient-influenced beginning gives the impression that "Nothing Really Matters" would be a ballad, but in the minute mark, it changes to a mid-tempo dance-pop song. The ambient music becomes restrained, although a cursory bleeping sound can be heard from the right to the left. The background has a number of faint strings in it, which signifies the depth of the stereo field. The chorus starts with a fast-pacing dance sound, over which Madonna sings, "Nothing really matters / love is all we need / everything I give you / all comes back to me." Throughout the entire song, it includes two verses, three choruses, one bridge section, and an outro. The bridge is backed by piano sounds with a descending sequence by a couple of bars. Madonna sings the same lyrics in the outro, but is slowed down and echoed longer until the music fades out.

The lyrics are about the birth of Madonna's daughter Lourdes, and the realization of motherhood. In an interview with the Wesleyan University Press, the singer stated: "There's a song on the album called 'Nothing Really Matters', and it is very much inspired by my daughter. it's just realizing that at the end of the day, the most important thing is loving people and sharing love. The birth of my daughter has been a huge influence. It's different to look at life through the eyes of a child, and suddenly you have a whole new respect for life and you kind of get your innocence back. It's this realisation which I incorporated in 'Nothing Really Matters', 'Little Star' and 'Mer Girl'." Based on the lyrical content, Bryan Lark from The Michigan Daily reviewed the parent album, and concluded that as the single "Ray of Light" was about confronting the past, "Nothing Really Matters" conversely is about "moving onward."

== Release ==
In the US, "Nothing Really Matters" was released as the fifth and final single from Ray of Light on February 9, 1999. Two 12-inch vinyl formats were released; one included four vinyls incorporating two tracks on each, while the second was reissued with new artwork and track listing. The maxi CD included the album version, and two remixes by the Peter Rauhofer under the alias Club 69. A promotional 7-inch vinyl was also issued, and included the original album version, along with the B-side and Ray of Light track "To Have and Not To Hold".

Internationally, "Nothing Really Matters" was released as the sixth and final single from Ray of Light. In the UK, two CD singles were issued; the first CD includes the album version, one remix by Rauhofer, and one remix by Peter Kruder & Richard Dorfmeister, whilst the second includes three remixes by Rauhofer. A cassette single was also released in the country, including the album version and one remix by Rauhofer.

== Critical reception ==
Stephen Thomas Erlewine from AllMusic, Kevin C. Johnson from the St. Louis Post-Dispatch and Chris Gernard from Metro Weekly highlighted "Nothing Really Matters" as one of Ray of Light's best tracks. Erlewine, who also wrote Madonna's biography for the website, cited the song as one of her career standouts. Chuck Taylor from Billboard labeled the song as a "gem" and commended the "irresistible hook". From the same publication, Jason Lipshutz commented, "What if the suave dance of 'Nothing Really Matters', the eye-popping 'Ray of Light' music video or the stark beauty of 'Frozen' never existed? Luckily, we never need to find out." Paul Moody from NME noted that the song "floats by almost as if it's asleep, a knowing return to the disco diva-effortlessness of 'Vogue', but with Madonna free from the narcissistic outer-shell of old, free to announce: 'I've realised/No-one wins...'" Rolling Stone said, "Songs like the title track and 'Nothing Really Matters' are filled with warmth and wonder." "A bubbly, infectious piece of shufflebeat…" Stuart Maconie wrote in a Q review of Ray of Light, "but aberrant items continually swim into view, like a tumbling, atonal piano solo right out of Schoenberg." Sunday Mirror said it is the "best pop tune" from the album. Stephen Thompson from The A.V. Club was positive, stating that the "chugging" chorus and composition "should ring across dance floors for years to come[...]" Nathan Smith from the Houston Press was also positive, stating, "Few singles illustrated [Madonna's change in musical approach] better than 'Nothing Really Matters'". He concluded, "It's a great, bouncy dance track that never received the love it deserved, and its family-friendly themes are a good fit for the event."

However, Enio Chiola from PopMatters felt the song's commercial appeal and production was inferior to other album tracks, and stated that "Skin"—another song from Ray of Light—would have been a better release. Jose F. Promis from AllMusic reviewed the single and awarded it two-and-a-half stars out of five. He suggested that the original album version was somewhat "tepid", and commented, "This single is a case of where the production supersedes the song, which in and of itself is among Madonna's simplest and least interesting tunes." However, he commended the remixes, including the "Eastern Asian", "chillout" and "several club cuts". Medium's Richard LaBeau opined that it was a "perfectly fine cut from her best album, but there are several other songs on the album that are better and would have made more interesting singles". Billboard's Nolan Feeney noted, "She keeps the platitudes from sounding empty by taking her younger self to task [...] Dance music is often a tool for artists and listeners to build their identities; here, Madonna uses pulsing beats to shed her skin". Ranking Madonna's singles in honor of her 60th birthday, The Guardian's Jude Rogers placed "Nothing Really Matters" at number 39, calling it a "heavenly ode to motherhood".

At the 2000 ASCAP Rhythm and Soul Awards, "Nothing Really Matters" was nominated for the Top Dance Song award; this was Madonna's first nomination in that category, and was her second nomination at the awards since the previous year, when her song "Ray of Light" was nominated, and eventually won the Top Dance Song award. "Nothing Really Matters" eventually won the award, becoming her first win in that category; she won it again in 2002 for "Don't Tell Me".

== Chart performance ==
In the United States, "Nothing Really Matters" debuted at number 99 on the Billboard Hot 100, making it her lowest entry on the chart. It reached a peak of number 93 the following week, and was present for two weeks overall. "Nothing Really Matters" topped the Dance Club Play chart and stayed there for two weeks, whilst peaking at number 25 on the Mainstream Top 40 chart. Jose F. Promis from AllMusic believed the single's lack of charting success in North America was due "to the terrible timing of the single's release, which was much after radio and club airplay had peaked." Many fans in North America blamed Warner Bros. Records' marketing strategy for the song's poor charting. "Nothing Really Matters" was also the first time since 1994's Bedtime Stories that Madonna charted four singles from her album on the Hot 100. In Canada, the song reached a peak of number seven on the RPM 100 Hit Tracks chart.

In the United Kingdom, "Nothing Really Matters" entered the UK Singles Chart at number seven on March 13, 1999. It was later certified Silver by the British Phonographic Industry (BPI) for shipments of 200,000 units. According to Official Charts Company, the song has sold 128,137 copies as of August 2008. In Belgium's Flanders region, the song debuted and peaked at number 43 on March 13, 1999, while in the Wallonia region it had a similar performance, spending a sole week on the chart. In the Netherlands, the song debuted at number 73 on the Single Top 100 chart, and reached a peak of 34 on March 13, 1999. The recording peaked at number 38 in Germany, spending a total of nine weeks on the chart. In Finland, the song debuted at number six on the Finnish Singles Chart, and spent two weeks overall. In Spain, it was number one on the Spanish Singles Chart and stayed there for three consecutive weeks.

In Australia, "Nothing Really Matters" debuted on the ARIA Singles Chart at its peak of number 15 on March 4, 1999. The next week, it descended to number 22, and continued down to its final appearance at number 49, being present for a total of six weeks on the chart. In New Zealand, the song debuted at number seven on the RIANZ Singles Chart on April 11, 1999. It stayed there for two weeks, until descending to number 45. It rose to number 26 on its final peaking week, and was present for a total of nine weeks on the chart.

== Music video ==
=== Background and inspiration ===
An accompanying music video for "Nothing Really Matters" was directed by Johan Renck and filmed in January 1999 at Silvercup Studios in Long Island City, New York. According to a behind-the-scenes interview with Entertainment Tonight, Madonna stated that the inspiration behind the video was from the 1997 Arthur Golden novel Memoirs of a Geisha. She later stated, "The whole idea of a geisha is a straight metaphor for being an entertainer because, on one hand you're privileged to be a geisha, but on the other hand you're a prisoner [...]" Madonna choreographed her own moves in the video, since she "[did not] like how other people say how I should move, I'm my own best choreographer." In an interview with American broadcaster and journalist Larry King, Madonna commented about the geisha depiction, "[...] there was a character in the book called Hatsumomo and she's been my muse for the past six months. So I don't know." She stated that her daughter, at the time, called Madonna the novel's character, Hatsumomo, which the singer found intriguing yet bizarre.

The red kimono that Madonna wore in the music video was created by French fashion designer Jean-Paul Gaultier. Her main look for the video consisted of heavy eye make-up and a pale face with dark, straight hair, as well as a pair red ankle high boots to accompany the kimono. The kimono was tailored by a large red leather belt. Madonna wore the kimono again for her performance at the 41st Annual Grammy Awards. The look was then re-designed by Gaultier and the Italian fashion duo Dean and Dan Caten for Madonna's 2001 Drowned World Tour. The visual for "Nothing Really Matters" premiered on MTV on February 13, 1999. The video can be found on Madonna's 1999 compilation, The Video Collection 93:99.

=== Synopsis and reception ===
Quick cuts showing the different looks in the video

The video opens with an empty room with a fish painting, and then shows Madonna holding to what looks like a baby, but is actually a big bag of water. Alternating scenes shows her in a red and black kimono dancing to the song. Then, a scene features a group of people of Asian heritage, who walk down a dark hallway. As Madonna sings the song in a black kimono, she grips onto the bag of water. When the chorus starts, it features Madonna in a red kimono continuing to dance. This scene carries on through the rest of the song. There are multiple scenes of young Swedes of Asian heritage performing butoh dance moves coached by Swedish choreographer Su-En. These scenes were shot in a decommissioned R1 Reactor below the Royal Institute of Technology in central Stockholm. The ending scene has Madonna sitting while someone is painting her back and slowly rests her body on the group. As the song fades, Madonna is in her red kimono walking and laughing towards the camera and then the screen rapidly fades to black.

The music video received favorable reviews from critics. Soman S. Chainani from The Crimson was positive in his review, stating, "The video is deliciously subversive. In a sense, Madonna consciously sheds layers of her post-modern act during the 4:25 minute video, daring us to piece together its clues." Labelling it a "surreal" video with "angular" imagery and direction, he concluded, "Random? Of course not. Realizing it's all the pieces of a puzzle, we grasp the stunning answer. Madonna is, in all truth, a modern-day geisha. She is trapped within her corridor, without the least privacy, but she is free to perform." A reviewer from HitFix commented, "[The video] is a gorgeous futuristic creation and one of Madonna's most underrated videos. Dark and hypnotic, 'Matters' features unconventional choreography that was initially off putting to many (at least for 1999), but in actuality director Johan Renck has created a visual spectacle that demands repeat viewing. It also features one of Madonna's more inspired video performances."

At the 1999 MTV Video Music Awards, Renck, Bjorn Benckert and Tor-Bjorn Olsson were all nominated for Best Special Effects in a Video. This was Madonna's second sub-credited nomination in that category, having been nominated, and eventually won for the same award a year prior with her single "Frozen". Madonna was also nominated three times for her single "Beautiful Stranger" that same year. However, Renck, Benckert, and Olsson lost to Sean Broughton, Stuart D. Gordon and Paul Simpson of Digital Domain with their work on "Special" by American-Scottish band Garbage; this remains Madonna's final video to be nominated in that category.

== Live performances ==
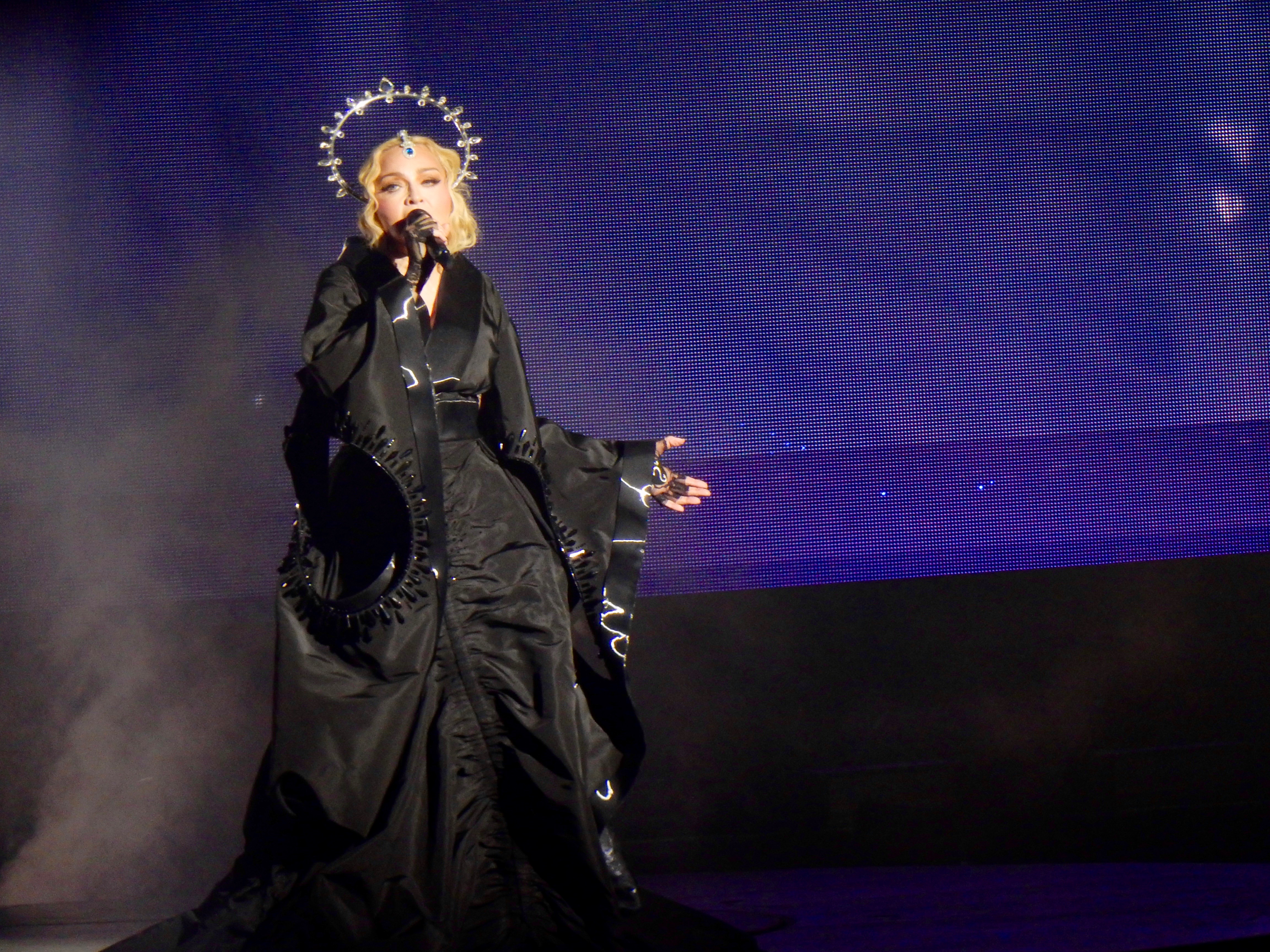
Madonna performing "Nothing Really Matters" on the 2023–24 Celebration Tour

On February 24, 1999, Madonna performed "Nothing Really Matters" as the opening number of the 41st Annual Grammy Awards. The performance was held and recorded at Shrine Auditorium in Los Angeles, California. The stage had two large Japanese infrastructures on either side, a black screen, and a semi-large bench on which Madonna stood. The performance opened with the lights beaming on Madonna, who wore the red Gaultier kimono, red platform boots, and black bob hairstyle. The chorus started with four back-up dancers holding plastic bag, similar to the Japanese people in the music video, and a background dancer being projected on screen. By the second chorus, Madonna's back-up vocalists started singing atop the benches wearing similar kimonos. During the song's bridge interlude, a man entered the stage and started performing with flamed rope. When Madonna won the award for Best Pop Vocal Album at the same ceremony, she came onstage with Orbit to accept the award in the red kimono.

The live performance received positive reviews from most music critics; Jason Kaufman from NY Rock commented, "Her constant nationality morphing has got to go. With her geisha-girl-gone-club-hopping outfit last night, [...] the woman proved she's a walking Epcot Center, long on fashion and short on culture. And what were those women dancing behind her in her musical number holding? The objects looked like fetuses from last week's The X-Files". Bradley Stern from Idolator hosted a poll, asking viewers what was their best Madonna Grammy performance. Alongside the 1999 Grammys, Stern listed Madonna's performances of "Music" at the 2001 ceremony, "Hung Up" at the 2006 ceremony, and "Same Love" and "Open Your Heart" at the 2014 ceremony. "Nothing Really Matters" came third in the poll with 102 votes. InStyle staff highlighted the performance as one of the best Grammy performances to date.

The song was performed as the opening number for the Celebration Tour of 2023–24. During the performance, she wore a floor-length black kimono and a diamond radial headdress while a large white light shined above her. The headdress was designed by German designer Malakai specifically for the tour, adorned with 25 large Swarovski crystals and paved with micro-crystals, using "Madonna's iconography and what she stands for" as main inspiration. Matt Cain from BBC Culture pointed out how "there are no distracting theatrics, just Madonna, her image and her voice – which has never sounded better" and described the performance as a "heartfelt rendition". According to Liam Hess of Vogue, given that "Nothing Really Matters" is one of Madonna's most personal tracks, "it made for a neat introduction to a show that offered a deliberately looser, chattier glimpse at Madonna, the woman".

== Legacy and other usage in media ==
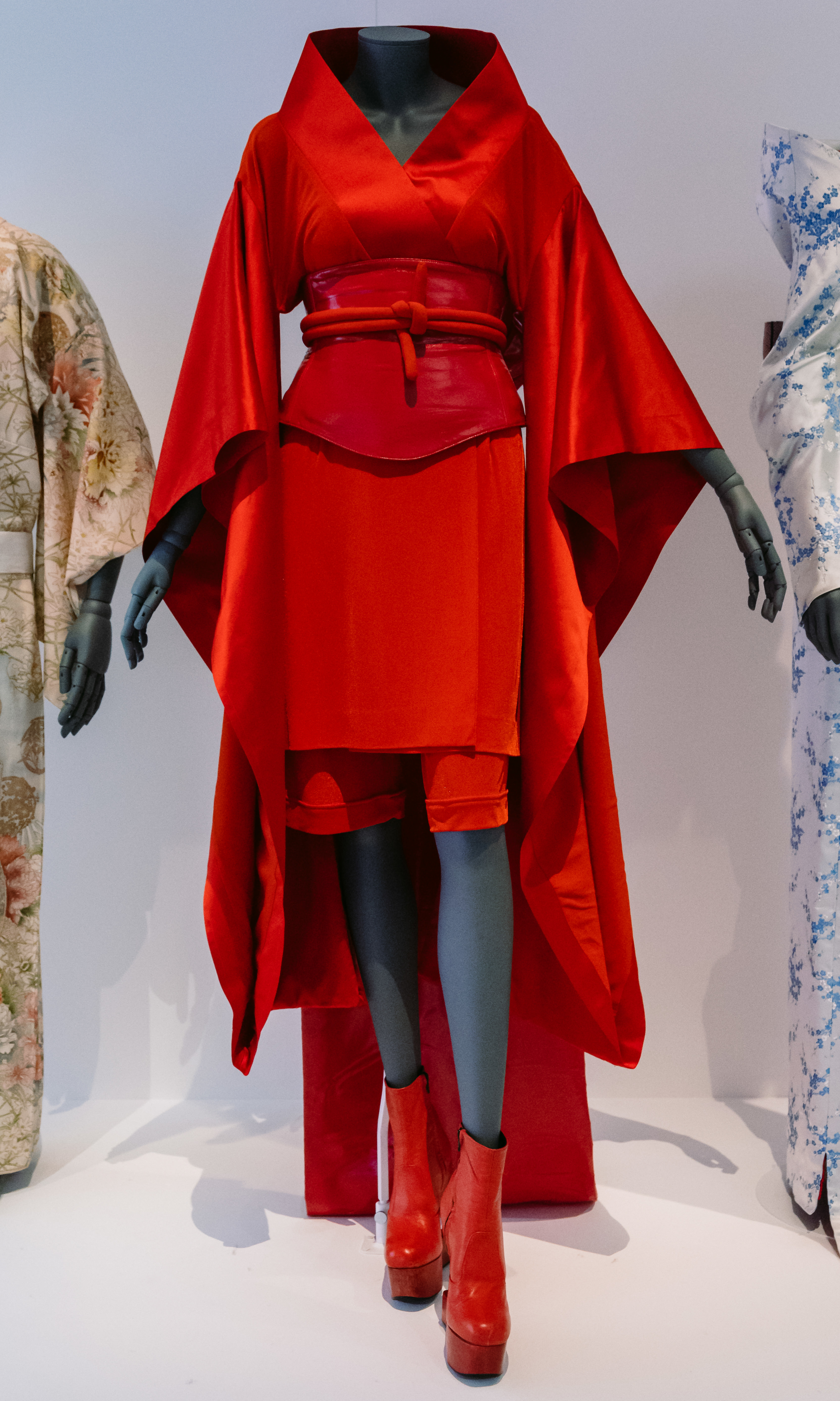
The red kimono designed by Jean-Paul Gaultier and worn by Madonna during the song's music video

"Nothing Really Matters" has been noted as one of Madonna's most underrated singles to date. Louis Virtel from NewNowNext listed the song at number 94 on their Top 100 Madonna Songs list, stating, "Copping both new-age maxims and Beatle sentiments ('Everything I give you all comes back to me'), 'Nothing Really Matters' is as queer and curious as a red patent-leather geisha costume." The Gaultier kimono has been cited by several publications as one of Madonna's most notable re-inventions and looks, including fashion magazines InStyle, Elle and Harper's Bazaar. Alongside this, the kimono has been recognized as one of the Grammy's best and worst looks.

Virtel also listed the music video at number 49 on his ranking of 55 Best Music Videos by Madonna. Julien Sauvalle from Out listed the video at number eight on his Top 20 Most Stylish Madonna music videos list. Idolator's Nicole Sta called the clip as one of Madonna's best music videos. Nikki Ogunnaike from Glamour magazine listed the video as one of Madonna's Top 5 Most Fashionable music videos.

The geisha look was further reproduced for Madonna's appearance on the May–June 1999 issue of Harper's Bazaar magazine. The singer took partial creative control of the issue, and requested photographer of the shoot Patrick Demarchelier to incorporate elements of the novel Memoirs of a Geisha into it, both visually and typographically. Three covers were selected for different regions around the world. In 2016, the geisha look was adapted on the Logo TV series RuPaul's Drag Race, season eight episode "Supermodel Snatch Game". The show's host, RuPaul, announced that contestants had to create a gown that was inspired by Madonna's iconic looks. Four drag queen contestants, Kim Chi, Naomi Smalls, Derrick Berry and Thorgy Thor wore the geisha look, including one sporting a similar look from the singer's music video "Paradise (Not for Me)". A fifth contestant, Chi Chi DeVayne, originally decided on wearing a kimono from the video of "Nothing Really Matters", but changed. This episode was criticized by Vulture, for the lack of variety of Madonna's iconic looks outside of "Nothing Really Matters".

Masahiro Ito has cited the song's music video as one of the inspirations for his work on the video game Silent Hill 2 (2001).

== Track listings and formats ==
- U.S. 7-inch vinyl
1. "Nothing Really Matters" (album version) – 4:27
2. "To Have and Not to Hold" – 5:23
- Cassette single
1. "Nothing Really Matters" (album version) – 4:27
2. "Nothing Really Matters" (Club 69 Radio Mix) – 3:45
- European 12-inch vinyl
1. "Nothing Really Matters" (Club 69 Vocal Club Mix) – 7:51
2. "Nothing Really Matters" (album version) – 4:27
3. "Nothing Really Matters" (Club 69 Future Mix) – 8:19
4. "Nothing Really Matters" (Club 69 Radio Mix) – 3:45
5. "Nothing Really Matters" (Club 69 Phunk Mix) – 8:00
6. "Nothing Really Matters" (Talvin Singh's Vikram Remix) – 7:43
7. "Nothing Really Matters" (Club 69 Future Dub) – 5:48
8. "Nothing Really Matters" (Kruder & Dorfmeister Remix) – 11:10
- CD single part one
1. "Nothing Really Matters" (album version) – 4:27
2. "Nothing Really Matters" (Club 69 Radio Mix) – 3:45
3. "Nothing Really Matters" (Kruder & Dorfmeister Remix) – 11:10
- CD single part two
1. "Nothing Really Matters" (Club 69 Radio Mix) – 3:45
2. "Nothing Really Matters" (Club 69 Future Mix) – 8:19
3. "Nothing Really Matters" (Club 69 Future Dub) – 5:48
- U.S. CD Maxi Single
1. "Nothing Really Matters" (album version) – 4:27
2. "Nothing Really Matters" (Club 69 Vocal Club Mix) – 7:51
3. "Nothing Really Matters" (Club 69 Future Mix) – 8:19
4. "Nothing Really Matters" (Club 69 Phunk Mix) – 8:00
5. "Nothing Really Matters" (Club 69 Speed Mix) – 10:35
6. "Nothing Really Matters" (Kruder & Dorfmeister Remix) - 11:10
7. "Nothing Really Matters" (Vikram Remix) - 7:43
8. "Nothing Really Matters" (Club 69 Future Dub) - 5:48
9. "Nothing Really Matters" (Club 69 Radio Mix) – 3:45
- Digital single (2023)
1. "Nothing Really Matters" (album version) – 4:27
2. "Nothing Really Matters" (Club 69 Radio Mix) – 3:45
3. "Nothing Really Matters" (Club 69 Vocal Club Mix) – 7:51
4. "Nothing Really Matters" (Club 69 Future Mix) – 8:19
5. "Nothing Really Matters" (Club 69 Phunk Mix) – 8:00
6. "Nothing Really Matters" (Club 69 Speed Mix) – 10:35
7. "Nothing Really Matters" (Kruder & Dorfmeister Remix) - 11.10
8. "Nothing Really Matters" (Vikram Remix) - 7:43
9. "Nothing Really Matters" (Club 69 Future Dub) - 5:48

== Credits and personnel ==
Credits are adapted from the Ray of Light album liner notes.

- Madonna – lead vocals, songwriter, producer
- Patrick Leonard – songwriter
- William Orbit – producer
- Marius De Vries – producer
- Niki Haris – background vocals
- Donna De Lory – background vocals
- Steve Sidelnyk – drum programming
- Mark Endert – engineer
- Jon Ingoldsby – engineer
- Patrick McCarthy – engineer
- Dave Reitzas – engineer
- Matt Silva – engineer
- Ted Jensen – mastering
- Kevin Reagan – art direction, design
- Luis Sanchis – photography

== Charts ==
=== Weekly charts ===
1999 weekly chart performance for "Nothing Really Matters"
Chart	Peak position
Australia (ARIA)	15
Austria (Ö3 Austria Top 40)	29
Belgium (Ultratop 50 Flanders)	43
Belgium (Ultratop 50 Wallonia)	39
Canada (Nielsen SoundScan)	6
Canada Top Singles (RPM)	7
Canada Adult Contemporary (RPM)	21
Canada Contemporary Hit Radio (BDS)	13
Canada Dance/Urban (RPM)	6
European Hot 100 Singles (Music & Media)	16
Finland (Suomen virallinen lista)	6
France (SNEP)	48
Germany (GfK)	38
Greece (IFPI)	5
Hungary (MAHASZ)	1
Iceland (Íslenski Listinn Topp 40)	5
Ireland (IRMA)	28
Italy (FIMI)	7
Italy Airplay (Music & Media)	9
Netherlands (Dutch Top 40 Tipparade)	3
Netherlands (Single Top 100)	34
New Zealand (Recorded Music NZ)	7
Scottish Singles Sales (Official Charts)	9
Spain (PROMUSICAE)	1
Sweden (Sverigetopplistan)	41
Switzerland (Schweizer Hitparade)	26
UK Singles (Official Charts)	7
US Billboard Hot 100	93
US Dance Club Songs (Billboard)	1
US Dance Singles Sales (Billboard)	3
US Pop Airplay (Billboard)	25

=== Year-end charts ===
1999 year-end chart performance for "Nothing Really Matters"
Chart	Position
Canada Top Singles (RPM)	86
European Radio Top 100 (Music & Media)	26
Romania (Romanian Top 100)	36
Spain (AFYVE)	17
UK Singles (OCC)	150
US Dance Club Play (Billboard)	9
US Maxi-Singles Sales (Billboard)	26

== Certifications ==
Certifications and sales for "Nothing Really Matters"
Region	Certification	Certified units/sales
United Kingdom (BPI)	Silver	200,000^{^}
^{^} Shipments figures based on certification alone.

== Release history ==
Release dates and formats for "Nothing Really Matters"
Region	Date	Format(s)		Label(s)	Ref.
United States	February 9, 1999	Contemporary hit radio; rhythmic contemporary radio		Warner Bros.	
France	February 19, 1999	12-inch vinyl; maxi CD		Maverick	
Germany	March 1, 1999	Maxi CD		Warner Music	
United Kingdom	March 1, 1999	12-inch vinyl; cassette; maxi CD (Note: In the UK, "Nothing Really Matters" was made available in two maxi CD variants.)		Maverick; Warner Bros.	
France	March 16, 1999	CD		Maverick	
United States	April 13, 1999	7-inch vinyl; 12-inch vinyl; cassette; CD; maxi CD		Maverick; Warner Bros.	
Canada	May 4, 1999	CD		Warner Music	
Various	March 31, 2023	Digital download; streaming	EP	Warner	

== See also ==
- List of number-one singles of 1999 (Spain)
- List of number-one dance singles of 1999 (U.S.)
- List of UK top 10 singles in 1998

== Bibliography ==
- Fouz-Hernández, Santiago; Jarman-Ivens, Freya (2004). Madonna's Drowned Worlds. Ashgate Publishing, Ltd. ISBN 0-7546-3372-1.
- Lysloff, René; Gay, Leslie (2003). Music and technoculture. Wesleyan University Press. pp. 192. ISBN 0-8195-6514-8.
- Metz, Allen; Benson, Carol (1999). The Madonna Companion: Two Decades of Commentary. Music Sales Group. ISBN 0-8256-7194-9.
- Morton, Andrew (2002). Madonna. Macmillan Publishers. ISBN 0-312-98310-7.
- O'Brien, Lucy (2007). Madonna: Like an Icon. HarperCollins. ISBN 978-0-593-05547-2.
- Rooksby, Rikky (2004). The Complete Guide to the Music of Madonna. Omnibus Press. ISBN 0-7119-9883-3.
- Salaverri, Fernando (2005). Sólo éxitos: año a año, 1959–2002 (1st ed.). Spain: Fundación Autor-SGAE. ISBN 84-8048-639-2.
- Taraborrelli, Randy J. (2002). Madonna: An Intimate Biography. Simon & Schuster. ISBN 978-1-4165-8346-2.
