= The Power of Good-Bye =

1998 single by Madonna

Single by Madonna

from the album Ray of Light
- A-side: "Little Star" (Note: In the UK, "The Power of Good-Bye was released as a double A-side single with "Little Star". In other European countries, "Little Star" served as the B-side.)
- B-side: "Mer Girl"
- Released: September 1, 1998
- Recorded: 1997
- Studio: Larrabee North; (North Hollywood, California)
- Genre: Electronica; pop
- Length: 4:10
- Label: Maverick; Warner Bros.
- Songwriters: Madonna; Rick Nowels
- Producers: Madonna; William Orbit; Patrick Leonard

Madonna singles chronology
"Drowned World/Substitute for Love" (1998)	"The Power of Good-Bye" / "Little Star" (1998)	"Nothing Really Matters" (1999)

Music video
- "The Power of Good-Bye" on YouTube

"The Power of Good-Bye" is a song recorded by American singer Madonna for her seventh studio album Ray of Light (1998). It was written by Madonna and Rick Nowels, and was produced by the singer with William Orbit and Patrick Leonard. Lyrically, the track discusses feelings of freedom and empowerment caused by ending a relationship. The electronica ballad is driven by shuffle beats, acoustic guitars and sweeping strings arranged by Craig Armstrong. The song was released as the fourth single from Ray of Light on September 1, 1998, by Maverick Records and Warner Bros. Records. In the United Kingdom, "The Power of Good-Bye" was issued as a double A-side with "Little Star".

"The Power of Good-Bye" received acclaim from music critics, who went on to recognize the song as one of the best on Ray of Light, with praise going to its instrumentation and electronic vibe, as well as Madonna's vocals which were compared to "Frozen" (1998). The song attained commercial success across Europe, reaching the top 10 of the charts in over nine countries, including Austria, Germany, Hungary, Iceland, Spain and on the UK singles chart, while in the United States it reached number 11 on the Billboard Hot 100, becoming Madonna's 37th top 20 hit and her seventh-lowest debut at the time. Its blue-green tinted music video was directed by Matthew Rolston in Malibu, California and features actor Goran Višnjić as her love interest. Madonna has performed the song live on several award shows and during various appearances on television but has never included it in a standard set list on tour.

== Background and release ==
Between 1996 and the release of this song's associated album in 1998, Madonna went through a number of "life-changing experiences" including giving birth to her daughter Lourdes Leon, interest in Eastern mysticism and Kabbalah, as well as playing the title role of Eva Perón in the film adaptation of the musical Evita (1996). A year later, following the promotion of the Evita soundtrack, she started working on Ray of Light; the album would reflect her changed perspectives about life. Madonna wrote songs with William Orbit, Patrick Leonard and Rick Nowels.

It was a career-changing experience for me. Before that I had always done my co-writing with friends. But working with Madonna [...] it was the first time I had ever written one-on-one with a great artist/writer. After that I changed gears a little, and now I mostly collaborate directly with artists.

— Nowels talking about the experience of writing the song with Madonna.

Madonna wrote "The Power of Good-Bye" with Rick Nowels; it was one of the nine songs they had written for the album. Nowels had always wanted to work with Madonna, admiring her previous work with Leonard, Stephen Bray as well as Nile Rodgers. The songwriter was in New York for the 39th Annual Grammy Awards, and during a shopping expedition in Barneys, he met Madonna. Nowels commended the singer on her songwriting skills, being later invited to Los Angeles for writing sessions. According to Lucy O'Brien, author of Madonna: Like an Icon, "[Nowels] was struck by [Madonna's] lyric writing", admitting that, "It was deep, poetic and intelligent. When she's on and at her best she's on a par with Joni Mitchell or Paul Simon". He also stated that the singer's songwriting prowess was benefited from her "voracious reading". Three songs from their sessions were selected for the final track list, "The Power of Good-Bye", "Little Star" and "To Have and Not to Hold".

After issuing "Drowned World/Substitute for Love" as the third single from Ray of Light outside North America, "The Power of Good-Bye" was chosen to be released as the fourth single, since "radio programmers and diehard fans [had] long been clamoring [for it]." In the US, it was released as the album's third single in September 1998. In the UK, the single was distributed as a double A-side with "Little Star". European editions of the single included several experimental remixes of "The Power of Good-Bye" by Luke Slater and an additional remix by Dallas Austin, who had previously worked with Madonna on Bedtime Stories (1994). As noted by AllMusic's Jose F. Promis, the "Luke Slater's Super Luper Mix" "turns the ballad into a thumping deep house anthem, making it sound like a completely different song." Meanwhile, "Fabien's Good God Mix" is described as "an electronic, tripped-out, drum'n'bass-heavy mix which keeps the integrity of the original song", Promis noted.

== Recording and composition ==
After the songwriting sessions ended with Nowels, Madonna started collaborating with Orbit and Leonard for recording the tracks. However, since Leonard could not devote much studio time, Madonna worked solely with Orbit. Around June 1997, the singer entered the Larrabee North Studio, Universal City, California to record the album, accompanied by Orbit, an engineer and a tape operator. According to Orbit, "Most of the tracks pre-existed, so Madonna would work on vocals and lyrics at home, or driving around in her car." The producer was initially uncomfortable with the singer around the studio checking the recording process, but gradually entered into a work dynamic with her. However, his disorganized nature almost got him fired when he reached Madonna's house to play "The Power of Good-Bye" and realized that he had carried the wrong DAT file. Madonna was not impressed and Orbit had to "virtually" remain in the studio for a week and deliver the final track.

"The Power of Good-Bye"
A 25 second sample of "The Power of Good-Bye" illustrates the chorus of the song, with the sustained notes, and the strings by Craig Armstrong. It also emphasizes the computer blips and techno effect sounds, as well as the acoustic guitar at the end of the chorus.

"The Power of Good-Bye" features production credit from Madonna, Orbit and Leonard, while Craig Armstrong was responsible for string arrangement. It was written in the time signature of common time, and is composed in the key of F minor with a moderate tempo of 80 beats per minute. Madonna's vocals range from G_{3} to C_{5} and the song follows a basic sequence of Fm–D♭–A♭–E♭ as its chord progression. It is an electronica melancholy ballad, with its arrangement being "anchored by a crisp shuffle beat and sweetened by occasional orchestral string flourishes and contrasting acoustic guitar strumming.

According to Rikky Rooksby, author of The Complete Guide to the Music of Madonna, "The Power of Good-Bye" begins with a four-chord arpeggio sequence. It has "catchy" melody phrases during the verses and a synth trumpet at the end of the first chorus, as well as Armstrong's strings present in the background. It also contains sustained notes on the instrumental sections, a characteristic for the songs on Ray of Light. Doubled acoustic guitar chords give an organic vibe during the beginning of the second verse, following a brief coda. The song also infuses computer blips and techno effect sounds, which Orbit achieved by using a Korg MS-20 analog synthesizer. The producer explained that "[t]here's something about [the MS-20's] transient peaks that are very spiky. And you can make that machine scream. Its two filters are very severe".

Lyrically, "The Power of Good-Bye" talks the strength that comes in letting go, and it was considered "a sort of sonic sister to 'Frozen'", since both deal with themes of a heart closed towards love. This is emphasized in the lyrics, "Your heart is not open so I must go" as well as "Freedom comes when you learn to let go, Creation comes when you learn to say no". The idea for using detachment as the inspiration for the song stemmed from Madonna's interest in Buddhist philosophy, as well as practicing Yoga. Nowels described the lyrics as "stunning" and commended its confessional nature. He also described the track as a "meditation" and "a beautiful poem". Australian music critic and friend of Madonna, Molly Meldrum, claimed the lyrics were about the singer's former husband Sean Penn. The lyrical content was also compared to literary works of William Shakespeare, Sylvia Plath and Anne Sexton.

== Critical reception ==
"Madonna imitating Jennifer Rush and Belinda Carlisle in a power ballad that will always give you the feeling that she could have done much better, but ['The Power of Good-Bye'] is so well built and is so epic that we firmly believe that it would sound good even with Katy Perry."

— Guillermo Alonso from Vanity Fair during a ranking of Madonna's singles.

Stephen Thomas Erlewine of AllMusic picked "The Power of Good-Bye" as one of Ray of Light's highlights, while Amy Pettifer of The Quietus called it "one of [the singer]'s finest moments". Larry Flick of Billboard praised the fact that "[Madonna] brilliantly nestles a dewy love ballad within a cutting-edge electronic pop framework." He noted that "[one] can listen to this track a dozen times and still pluck something new from the richly layered arrangement", while highlighting Madonna's vocals, writing that she "performs with a confidence that allows her to flawlessly merge a widened vocal range with a considerable dose of raw emotion and soul." Daily Record said it is "brilliant". Bryan Lark of The Michigan Daily picked the song and "Frozen" as "the album's best two tracks", noting that both proved that "[Madonna] still likes to get into the groove, explaining why this a techno album and not part of the Moods series." Greg Kot of the Chicago Tribune felt that the "rapturous sweep of '[The] Power of Good-Bye' [proves that] Madonna has succeeded where all of her pop peers have failed: She's made not just street-smart disco, but smart pop." Authors Allen Metz and Carol Benson wrote in The Madonna Companion that the track, along with "Frozen" and "To Have and Not to Hold" from the album, formed a "dream trilogy" during which Madonna does a monologue with herself, talking about divinity.

Rachel Brodsky of Spin remarked that both "The Power of Good-Bye" and "Frozen" were able to "cement the mainstream crossover of a dance culture once relegated to illegal basement parties". Elysa Gardner of the Los Angeles Times perceived that "Madonna's enduring knack for incorporating hip and exotic textures into accessible pop tunes is evident on avant-leaning dance tracks such as 'Nothing Really Matters' and 'The Power of Good-bye'." Charlotte Robinson of PopMatters praised the inclusion of the recording and other Orbit tracks on Madonna's 2001 compilation album GHV2, for representing "a testament to [the producer's] ability to use gadgets and electronic wizardry not to alienate listeners, but to draw them in". Sal Cinquemani of Slant Magazine gave an A− grade to the song for its composition, writing that it was "[s]tructured like your average adult contemporary ballad with enough electronic sheen to sound edgy, 'The Power of Goodbye' was the ultimate in electronica-lite." While ranking Madonna's singles in honor of her 60th birthday, The Guardian's Jude Rogers placed the track at number 29, calling it one of Ray of Light's "many powerful sub-aquatic electronic" ballads. Similarly, Entertainment Weekly's Chuck Arnold listed "The Power of Good-Bye" as the singer's 41st best single, writing that "a knowing reference to the wide-eyed plea of her earlier hit 'Open Your Heart', this gorgeous goodbye almost makes the heartache worth it". Medium's Richard LaBeau deemed it "one of the most underrated songs of Madonna’s career, this melancholy electronica ballad is one of her most deeply affecting".

== Chart performance ==
"The Power of Good-Bye" entered the US Billboard Hot 100 chart at number 41 on the issue for the week ending October 17, 1998, becoming Madonna's 16th single to debut inside the top 50 and also her 38th overall top 50 hit. It also became the seventh-highest debut of her career. It eventually peaked at number 11 on the week ending November 28, 1998. According to Jose F. Promis of AllMusic, what kept the song from reaching the top 10 was because "[its maxi CD], unfortunately, never saw the light of day in the U.S." "The Power of Good-Bye" was present for a total of 19 weeks on the Hot 100. In Canada, the song debuted at number 87 on the RPM 100 Hit Tracks chart. It reached a peak of number 16 on the chart after 10 weeks.

In the United Kingdom, the song had better chart placement. The A-side with "Little Star" debuted at number six on the UK Singles Chart, and was present for a total of 11 weeks, selling 175,095 copies as of August 2008, according to the Official Charts Company. It became Madonna's 36th best-selling single in that country and in May 2018 was certified Silver by the British Phonographic Industry (BPI).

In countries like Austria, Finland, Germany, Netherlands, Spain and Switzerland "The Power of Good-Bye" reached the top 10. Its high chart placements enabled the track to debut at number two on the pan-Eurochart Hot 100 Singles, behind "Believe" (1998) by singer Cher. It further attained Gold certifications from Austria, Germany and Sweden. In Spain, "The Power of Good-Bye" was the only single from Ray of Light to not reach number one, meanwhile in Australia the song was her first single since "Love Don't Live Here Anymore" (1996) to miss the top 20 peaking at number 33.

== Music video ==
The music video for "The Power of Good-Bye" was directed by Matthew Rolston, and was filmed in August 1998 at Silvertop House in Los Angeles, California and Malibu Beach. According to Entertainment Tonight, the filming was emotional for Madonna due to the song's meaning of break-up and "love story gone wrong". She wanted to make the visual's storyline dramatic, hence chose Rolston as the director and together they concocted the emotional narrative of the clip. Although she respected the director's vision of the clip, Madonna nevertheless wanted to be a part of the creative process of the videotaping. The scenes of the singer walking along the beach were shot with her actually walking on a treadmill.

Madonna playing chess in the music video for "The Power of Good-Bye". The scene was inspired by the 1968 heist film The Thomas Crown Affair.

Madonna's lover in the video is played by Croatian actor Goran Višnjić, who was selected by the singer after she saw his acting in the British film Welcome to Sarajevo (1997). Calling him "the sexiest male working today", Madonna explained that "[she] was looking for an actor to be in [the] video and his face came right into my head". The video premiered on MTV on September 10, 1998, a few minutes before the 1998 MTV Video Music Awards show began. It was occasionally played on The WB to promote the television series Felicity, which played the song as the background music during its TV ads.

The video shows Madonna and Višnjić playing chess and ultimately the singer destroying the chess board, symbolizing an end to their relationship. She then goes walking by the sea, passing a man walking his dog on the beach. Intercut are scenes of Madonna singing the song in front of a curtain. The video is color graded to a blue-green tint and the chess scene was inspired by that in the 1968 heist film The Thomas Crown Affair (with Steve McQueen and Faye Dunaway). Listing the clip at number 23 on their countdown of "Madonna's 55 Best Videos", Louis Virtel from The Backlot said that the singer looked "startlingly gorgeous, and her throes of agony at video's end occur in only the loveliest, bluest light."

The scenes showing Madonna walking alone on the beach was an homage to actress Joan Crawford in the 1946 film Humoresque. Christopher Rosa from VH1 listed it as one of Madonna's 10 Most Underrated Videos. He compared the blue-tinged visuals to the video for "Frozen", but found the plot to be more complex. Rosa also noted that the ending showing Madonna walking towards the sea was purposefully ambiguous. "Does Madonna drown herself in the ocean? Does she move on from her lover? Whatever the case, there is no denying this moody video is one of Madge's most effective ever," he concluded. The video can be found on the Madonna compilations, The Video Collection 93:99 (1999) and Celebration: The Video Collection (2009).

== Live performances ==
Madonna first performed "The Power of Good-Bye" on October 23, 1998, during the VH1 and Vogue Fashion Awards, dressed in black latex and leather, accompanied by the children of Opus 118 from The Harlem School of the Arts. On November 12, the singer performed the song at the 1998 MTV Europe Music Awards in Italy, dressed in black. John Dingwall from Daily Record noted that Madonna "struggled" on delivering the performance, as she seemed nervous. "The Power of Good-Bye" was also one of the few singles that Madonna has performed on the BBC program Top of the Pops, which aired seven days later. On November 23, 1998, she appeared on the Spanish Televisión Española music show Séptimo de caballería and performed "The Power of Good-Bye", along with her European single, "Drowned World/Substitute for Love".

== Track listings and formats ==
- US 7-inch vinyl, cassette, and CD single
1. "The Power of Good-Bye" (Album Version) – 4:10
2. "Mer Girl" – 5:32
- Australian and Japanese maxi-CD
1. "The Power of Good-Bye" (Album Version) – 4:13
2. "The Power of Good-Bye" (Dallas' Low End Mix) – 4:34
3. "The Power of Good-Bye" (Luke Slater's Super Luper) – 8:45
4. "The Power of Good-Bye" (Luke Slater's Filtered Mix) – 6:07
5. "The Power of Good-Bye" (Fabien's Good God Mix) – 8:22
- European 12-inch vinyl
1. "The Power of Good-Bye" (Dallas' Low End Mix) – 4:34
2. "The Power of Good-Bye" (Luke Slater's Super Luper) – 8:45
3. "The Power of Good-Bye" (Fabien's Good God Mix) – 8:22
4. "The Power of Good-Bye" (Album Version) – 4:10
- European and UK CD single
1. "The Power Of Good-Bye" (Album Version) – 4:10
2. "Little Star" – 5:18
- Maxi CD single
1. "The Power of Good-Bye" (Album Version) – 4:10
2. "Little Star" – 5:18
3. "The Power of Good-Bye" (Dallas' Low End Mix) – 4:34
- Digital single (2023)
1. "The Power of Good-Bye" (Album Version) – 4:11
2. "The Power of Good-Bye" (Dallas' Low End Mix) – 4:34
3. "The Power of Good-Bye" (Slater's Super Luper Mix) – 8:46
4. "The Power of Good-Bye" (Fabien's Good God Mix) – 8:23
5. "The Power of Good-Bye" (Slater's Filtered Mix) – 6:07

== Credits and personnel ==
Credits are adapted from the liner notes of Ray of Light.

- Madonna – lead vocals, songwriter, producer
- Rick Nowels – songwriter
- William Orbit – producer, arrangement, drum programming, sequencer, mixing
- Patrick Leonard – producer
- Craig Armstrong – strings
- Mark Endert – engineer
- Ted Jensen – mastering
- Mario Testino – photography
- Kevin Reagan – art direction, design

== Charts ==
=== Weekly charts ===
Weekly chart performance for "The Power of Good-Bye"
Chart (1998–1999)	Peak position
Australia (ARIA)	33
Austria (Ö3 Austria Top 40)	4
Belgium (Ultratop 50 Flanders)	31
Belgium (Ultratop 50 Wallonia)	20
Canada (Nielsen SoundScan)	6
Canada Top Singles (RPM)	16
Canada Adult Contemporary (RPM)	13
Canada Contemporary Hit Radio (BDS)	6
Europe (European Hot 100 Singles)	2
Finland (Suomen virallinen lista)	4
France (SNEP)	21
France Airplay (SNEP)	1
Germany (GfK)	4
Hungary (Mahasz)	6
Iceland (Íslenski Listinn Topp 40)	2
Ireland (IRMA)	23
Italy (FIMI)	8
Netherlands (Dutch Top 40)	6
Netherlands (Single Top 100)	7
New Zealand (Recorded Music NZ)	25
Poland Airplay (Music & Media)	1
Scottish Singles Sales (Official Charts) with "Little Star"	5
Spain (AFYVE)	2
Sweden (Sverigetopplistan)	3
Switzerland (Schweizer Hitparade)	8
UK Singles (Official Charts) with "Little Star"	6
UK Dance (Official Charts)	39
US Billboard Hot 100	11
US Adult Contemporary (Billboard)	14
US Adult Pop Airplay (Billboard)	40
US Pop Airplay (Billboard)	18

=== Year-end charts ===
1998 year-end chart performance for "The Power of Good-Bye"
Chart (1998)	Position
Canada Adult Contemporary (RPM)	99
Germany (Media Control)	79
Netherlands (Dutch Top 40)	89
Sweden (Hitlistan)	43

1999 year-end chart performance for "The Power of Good-Bye"
Chart (1999)	Position
Canada Adult Contemporary (RPM)	100
Europe (European Radio Top 100)	68
Germany (Media Control)	89
Netherlands (Dutch Top 40)	137
US Adult Contemporary (Billboard)	41

== Certifications ==
Certifications and sales for "The Power of Good-Bye"
Region	Certification	Certified units/sales
Austria (IFPI Austria)	Gold	25,000^{*}
Germany (BVMI)	Gold	250,000^{^}
Sweden (GLF)	Gold	15,000^{^}
United Kingdom (BPI)	Silver	200,000^{‡}
^{*} Sales figures based on certification alone.^{^} Shipments figures based on certification alone.^{‡} Sales+streaming figures based on certification alone.

== Release history ==
Release dates and formats for "The Power of Good-Bye"
Region	Date	Format(s)	Label(s)	Ref.
United States	September 1, 1998	Contemporary hit radio	Warner Bros.	
United States	September 29, 1998	7-inch vinyl; cassette; CD	Maverick; Warner Bros.	
Canada	October 27, 1998	Maxi CD	Warner Music	
France	November 7, 1998	12-inch vinyl; maxi CD (Note: In Europe, "The Power of Good-Bye" was made available in two maxi CD variants, with one including remixes alongside the original version, and the other including "Little Star".)	Maverick	
Germany	November 9, 1998	Maxi CD	Warner Music	
France	November 20, 1998	CD	Maverick	
United Kingdom	November 23, 1998	12-inch vinyl; maxi CD	Maverick; Warner Bros.	

== See also ==
- List of UK top 10 singles in 1998

== Bibliography ==
- Jeanrod, Werner G.; Theobald, Christoph (2001). God, Experience and Mystery, Volume 1. SCM Press. ISBN 978-0-334-03062-1.
- Metz, Allan; Benson, Carol (1999). The Madonna Companion: Two Decades of Commentary. Music Sales Group. ISBN 0-8256-7194-9.
- O'Brien, Lucy (2008). Madonna: Like an Icon. Bantam Press. ISBN 978-0-593-05547-2.
- Rooksby, Rikky (2004). The Complete Guide to the Music of Madonna. Omnibus Press. ISBN 0-7119-9883-3.
- Salaverri, Fernando (2005). Sólo éxitos: año a año, 1959–2002. Spain: Fundación Autor-SGAE. ISBN 84-8048-639-2.
- Taraborrelli, J. Randy (2008). Madonna: An Intimate Biography. Simon & Schuster. ISBN 978-0-7432-2880-0.
