= Little Star (Madonna song) =

1998 single by Madonna

Single by Madonna

from the album Ray of Light
- A-side: "The Power of Good-Bye"
- Released: November 23, 1998
- Recorded: 1997
- Studio: Larrabee North; (North Hollywood, California)
- Genre: Ambient; drum and bass; electronica
- Length: 5:18
- Label: Maverick; Warner Bros.
- Songwriters: Madonna; Rick Nowels
- Producers: Madonna; Marius de Vries

Madonna singles chronology
"Drowned World/Substitute for Love" (1998)	"The Power of Good-Bye" / "Little Star" (1998)	"Nothing Really Matters" (1999)

"Little Star" is a song recorded by American singer Madonna for her seventh studio album Ray of Light (1998). It was written by Madonna and Rick Nowels, and was produced by the singer with Marius de Vries. It is the only track on the album not to have production credits from William Orbit. Lyrically, the track is an ode to Madonna's first child, Lourdes Leon. The ambient lullaby is driven by skittering drum and bass beats, dreamy basslines, and sweeping strings. Worldwide, "The Power of Good-Bye" was released as the fourth single from Ray of Light. In the United Kingdom, however, "Little Star" was issued as a double A-side with "The Power of Good-Bye" and released as the fourth single from Ray of Light in the country on November 23, 1998, by Maverick Records and Warner Bros. Records.

"Little Star" received acclaim from music critics, with praise going to its instrumentation and Madonna's vocal delivery. The song attained commercial success, peaking at number 6 in the United Kingdom and at 5 in Scotland.

== Background and release ==
Between 1996 and the release of this song's associated album in 1998, Madonna went through a number of "life-changing experiences" including giving birth to her daughter Lourdes, interest in Eastern mysticism and Kabbalah, as well as playing the title role in the film adaptation of the musical Evita (1996). A year later, following the promotion of the Evita soundtrack, she started working on Ray of Light; the album would reflect her changed perspectives about life. Madonna wrote songs with William Orbit, Patrick Leonard and Rick Nowels.

I was driving to the studio and played back the demo in my car. I started crying because it was so beautiful. I affected me - to be able to create a song about a child that was so moving and carefully expressed.

— Nowels talking about the experience of writing the song with Madonna.

Madonna wrote "Little Star" with Rick Nowels. Nowels had always wanted to work with Madonna, admiring her previous work with Leonard, Stephen Bray, as well as Nile Rodgers. The songwriter was in New York for the Grammy Awards, and during a shopping expedition in Barneys, he met Madonna. Nowels commended the singer on her songwriting skills, being later invited to Los Angeles for writing sessions. The two were both new parents at the time, and bonded over their shared experience. The writing for "Little Star" emerged following an unsuccessful attempt at incorporating a soundtrack sample from the cult seventies film Vampyros Lesbos into a song. "I was panicking a bit [...] then I just started playing three chords, and Madonna started singing," Nowells noted. "I followed her, and the rest was stream of consciousness".

Nowels was impressed by Madonna's work ethic, noting: "Before I worked with Madonna, I never believed you could get a song together in an hour, but she would channel it. We'd have a melody within half an hour. She would always leave bang on 7pm to go to see Lola, but we'd always have a song written and demoed. We wrote nine songs in ten days". Of these nine songs, three songs from their sessions were selected for the final track list: "The Power of Good-Bye", "Little Star" and "To Have and Not to Hold".

After issuing "Drowned World/Substitute for Love" as the third single from Ray of Light outside North America, "The Power of Good-Bye" was chosen to be released as the fourth single, but in the UK, the single was distributed as a double A-side with "Little Star". The record label promoted it as "a perfect Christmas track".

== Recording and composition ==
After the songwriting sessions ended with Nowels, Madonna started collaborating with Orbit, de Vries, and Leonard for recording the tracks. Around June 1997, the singer entered the Larrabee North Studio, Universal City, California to record the album. Marius de Vries's contributions to the album were sequenced using ProTools. Marius de Vries described the song: "It's a delicate tune. I knew it had to be handled with butterfly-like delicacy, but also knew it needed an engine room to it, an energy, so it didn't become mawkish. That's why I did something with this skittery, unsettled, never quite resolving beat to counteract the warmth and coziness of the central idea."

"Little Star" is the only track on the album not to have production credits from William Orbit, instead being solely produced by Madonna and Marius de Vries. Orbit noted: "I had nothing to do with this track, apart from being around when it was done. [...] I walked by, loved it and gave them the thumbs up." Steve Sidelnyk was responsible for additional drum programming. It was written in the time signature of common time, and is composed in the key of E major with a fast tempo of 140 beats per minute.

It is an ambient electronica lullaby, with its arrangement being "an understated affair that combines skittering drum and bass beats with dreamy fretless basslines and strings that soar like a songbird". Rikky Rooksby, author of The Complete Guide to the Music of Madonna, compared "Little Star" to Madonna's previous single "Dear Jessie", but called it "not as inventive". They described it as having a "lighter touch" than other songs on the album. They highlighted the "high-pitched electric piano chords" and a "drum-beat that remains a rapid rustling rather than a dance beat". Johnny Black of Q described it as "the most ambient track" with "restrained beats and complex effects held back by sweeping strings."

Lyrically, the track is an ode to Madonna's first child, Lourdes Leon. Eric Mason of Slant Magazine felt that the song represented Madonna's experience of losing her own mother and a "desire to shield her daughter from the inevitable experience of loss". Madonna categorized "Little Star" as the "one super-sentimental song" on Ray of Light. She would later reference the song in the lyrics of "The Test", a collaboration with Leon that was included on Madonna's fifteenth studio album Confessions II (2026).

== Critical reception ==
Passionate peaks like "Drowned World" and "Little Star" remind you that for all the years Madonna has spent chasing art, class and fashion, the reason we still care about her eccentricities is the emotion in her music; all her desperately chic decor can’t hide her rock & roll heart."

— Rob Sheffield from Rolling Stone

"Little Star" received generally positive reviews from music critics. Billboard's Jon O'Brien compared the song to others about parenthood and said that it was not a "typical schmaltzfest". He felt that despite the track not having production from William Orbit like the other songs on Ray of Light, the "enchanting alt-lullaby still fits in seamlessly." Rob Sheffield from Rolling Stone described "Little Star" as a "spacey, utterly convincing lullaby" and felt that it was one of the standouts on the album. Elysa Gardner of the Los Angeles Times felt that Madonna's "wonderfully emotive" vocals came across as "tender and nurturing on the gentle, shimmering 'Little Star'".

Eric Mason of Slant Magazine described the song as a "superficially sweet lullaby". Bryan Lark of The Michigan Daily felt that the song was one of the "most sentiment-filled" songs on the record which was "teetering on the edge of cheese" but that it had a "subtle, restrained arrangement". In a more negative sentiment, Garry Mulholland from The Guardian wrote that the song shows that "Madonna struggles most when trying to say something nice about a real person".

== Chart performance ==
In the United Kingdom, the double A-side with "The Power of Good-Bye" debuted at number six on the UK Singles Chart, and was present for a total of 11 weeks, selling 175,095 copies as of August 2008, according to the Official Charts Company. It became Madonna's 36th best-selling single in that country and in May 2018 was certified Silver by the British Phonographic Industry (BPI). In Scotland, the release peaked at number 5.

== Live performances ==
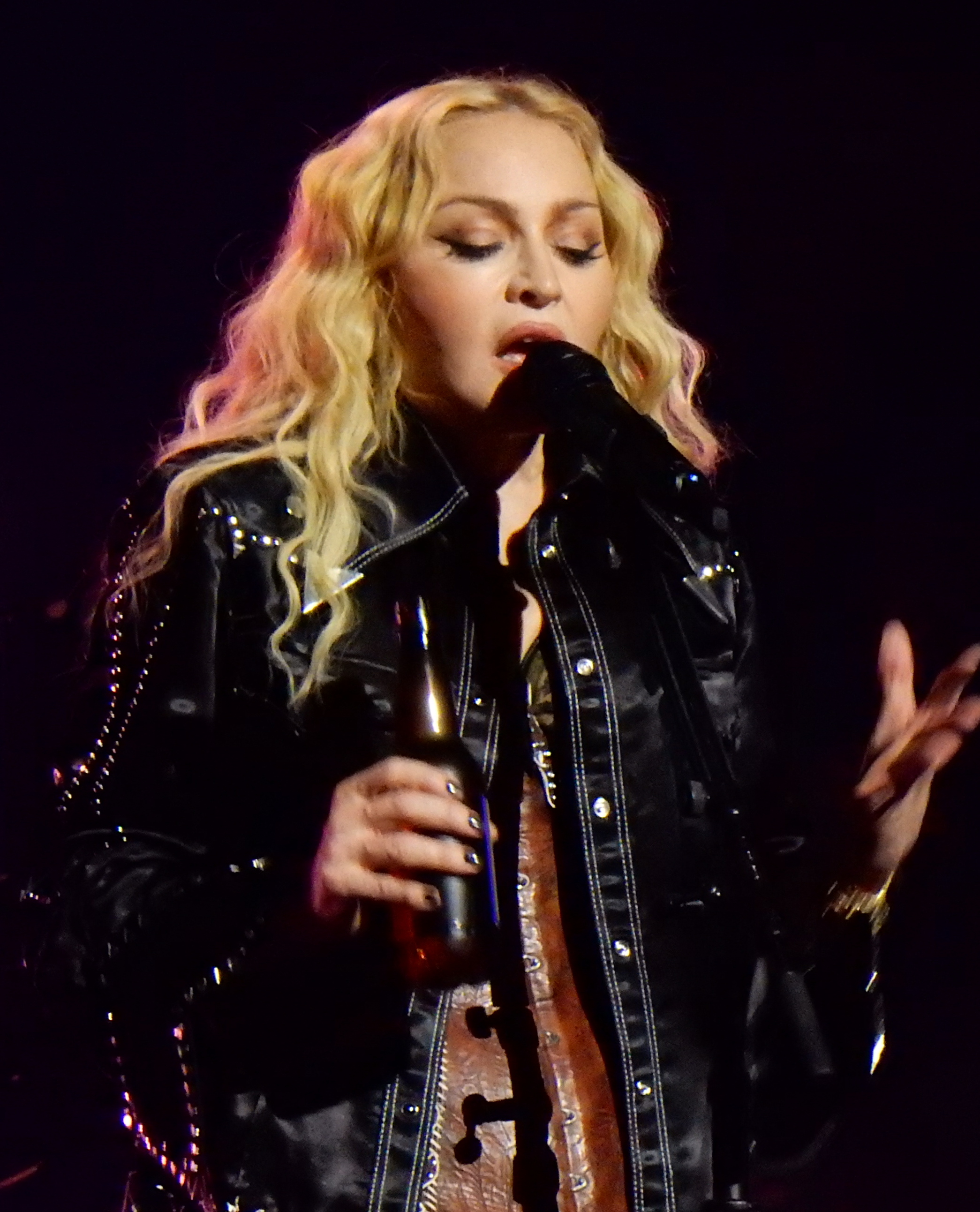
Madonna performing "Little Star" in London during the Celebration Tour on October 14, 2023

Madonna performed "Little Star" on The Oprah Winfrey Show on May 29, 1998, along with "Ray of Light". The performance of "Little Star" was initially reported to have been selected for inclusion on the commercial single of "The Power of Good-Bye" in the United States, but it was ultimately excluded from the release.

During the opening concert of the Celebration Tour in London, on October 14, 2023, Madonna performed "Little Star" a cappella to commemorate the 27th birthday of her daughter Lourdes Leon.

== Track listings and formats ==
- European and UK CD single
1. "The Power of Good-Bye" – 4:10
2. "Little Star" – 5:18
- Maxi CD single
1. "The Power of Good-Bye" – 4:10
2. "Little Star" – 5:18
3. "The Power of Good-Bye" (Dallas' Low End Mix) – 4:34

== Credits and personnel ==
Credits are adapted from the liner notes of Ray of Light.

- Madonna – lead vocals, songwriter, producer
- Rick Nowels – songwriter
- Marius de Vries – producer
- Steve Sidelnyk – additional drum programming
- Mark Endert – engineer
- Ted Jensen – mastering
- Mario Testino – photography
- Kevin Reagan – art direction, design

== Charts ==
Weekly chart performance for "Little Star"
Chart (1998–1999)	Peak position
Scottish Singles Sales (Official Charts) with "The Power of Good-Bye"	5
UK Singles (Official Charts) with "The Power of Good-Bye"	6

== Certifications ==
Certifications and sales for "Little Star"
Region	Certification	Certified units/sales
United Kingdom (BPI) with "The Power of Good-bye"	Silver	200,000^{‡}
^{‡} Sales+streaming figures based on certification alone.

== Release history ==
Release dates and formats for "Little Star"
Region	Date	Format(s)	Label(s)	Ref.
United Kingdom	November 23, 1998	12-inch vinyl; maxi CD	Maverick; Warner Bros.	

== See also ==
- List of UK top-ten singles in 1998

== Bibliography ==
- O'Brien, Lucy (2008). Madonna: Like an Icon. Bantam Press. ISBN 978-0-593-05547-2.
- O'Brien, Lucy (2018). Madonna: Like an Icon (2018 ed.). Corgi Books. ISBN 9780552176026.
- Rooksby, Rikky (2004). The Complete Guide to the Music of Madonna. Omnibus Press. ISBN 0-7119-9883-3.
