= Madonna: Like an Icon =

Book by Lucy O'Brien

- Book cover (UK)
- Author: Lucy O'Brien
- Language: English
- Subject: Madonna
- Genre: Biography
- Publisher: Bantam Press
- Publication date: 27 August 2007
- Publication place: United Kingdom
- Media type: Print (Hardcover and Paperback)
- Pages: 432
- ISBN: 0-593-05547-0

Madonna: Like an Icon is a biography by English author Lucy O'Brien, chronicling the life of American singer Madonna. The book was released on 27 August 2007, by Bantam Press in the United Kingdom, and on 18 October 2007, by HarperCollins in the United States. Madonna: Like an Icon chronicles the life of the singer from her birth, up to the release of her eleventh studio album, Hard Candy, in 2008. Initially critical of her work, O'Brien had become a fan of Madonna after seeing her perform on television for The Virgin Tour in 1985. From that point of time, the author followed Madonna's career closely, attending her concerts, and collecting interviews, magazines, and albums.

When O'Brien finally decided to write a biography on Madonna in 2005, she wanted the book to be more about the singer's contribution to her music, rather than delving too much into her personal life, unlike other Madonna biographers. The author then interviewed dancers, choreographers, musicians, and producers who worked with Madonna. After its release, the book received a mixed response from critics. They were unanimous that the over-emphasis given on the singer's discography was unnecessary, instead more thought should have been given on exploring her personal life, which would have made the biography compelling.

== Summary ==
The biography is divided into three parts. The first part is named "Baptism" and tells about Madonna's birth in Detroit, Michigan, her early childhood, her time in New York, and her dance degree. It also talks in detail about the release of her first three studio albums—Madonna, Like a Virgin and True Blue—her marriage to actor Sean Penn, and also her foray into films. The middle part, named "Confession", starts from the Like a Prayer era onwards where Madonna has become a global superstar. It continues up to the release of the erotic coffee table book called Sex, and the subsequent commercial disappointments that she faced. The third part is called "Absolution", and starts with Madonna giving birth to her daughter Lourdes. It continues with the release of Ray of Light (1998) and subsequent four studio albums, her worldwide concert tours, her marriage to Guy Ritchie and controversies surrounding her adoption from Malawi. It ends with the release of Madonna's 2008 album, Hard Candy, and the singer reaching the age of fifty.

== Background and writing ==
Lucy O'Brien first came to like Madonna in 1985, when she saw the singer on television, performing on The Virgin Tour. She previously thought that Madonna "was that cheesy pop bimbo in lycra, writhing on a Venetian gondola for the 'Like a Virgin' video." However, The Virgin Tour changed her opinion and by the time Madonna's 1985 film Desperately Seeking Susan was released, O'Brien confessed that Madonna had won her admiration. The author had admired Madonna's lack of fear, and her ability to incorporate alternative culture and sexuality in her work.

In 2005, O'Brien started writing a book on Madonna, where she wanted to look at her life and work, as the artist was approaching the age of fifty. She believed that the general public was eager to know the real-self of Madonna, and she concentrated on finding that out. According to her, "the popular negative stereotype about the artist is that of a publicity-hungry, manipulative ball-breaker, while for many woman she is a beacon of feminism. I have always found her work clear and autobiographical, but her personality complex and disarmingly changeable."

However, due to the shifting images that Madonna presented, O'Brien was confused as to how she can approach writing the biography. She found that analyzing Madonna's music was a helpful method. The author then interviewed dancers, choreographers, musicians, and producers who worked with Madonna. While talking to them, O'Brien reflected on her own childhood and found parallels with Madonna—being born in a Catholic family and gradually becoming aware of the rise of feminism and gay liberation. She kept getting two stark pictures of the artist as her "search for Madonna became maddening", stating "There was the woman who was ruthless in moving on and rude to the competition, and there was a woman I'd never seen before – sweet, childlike and captivating."

== Release and reception ==
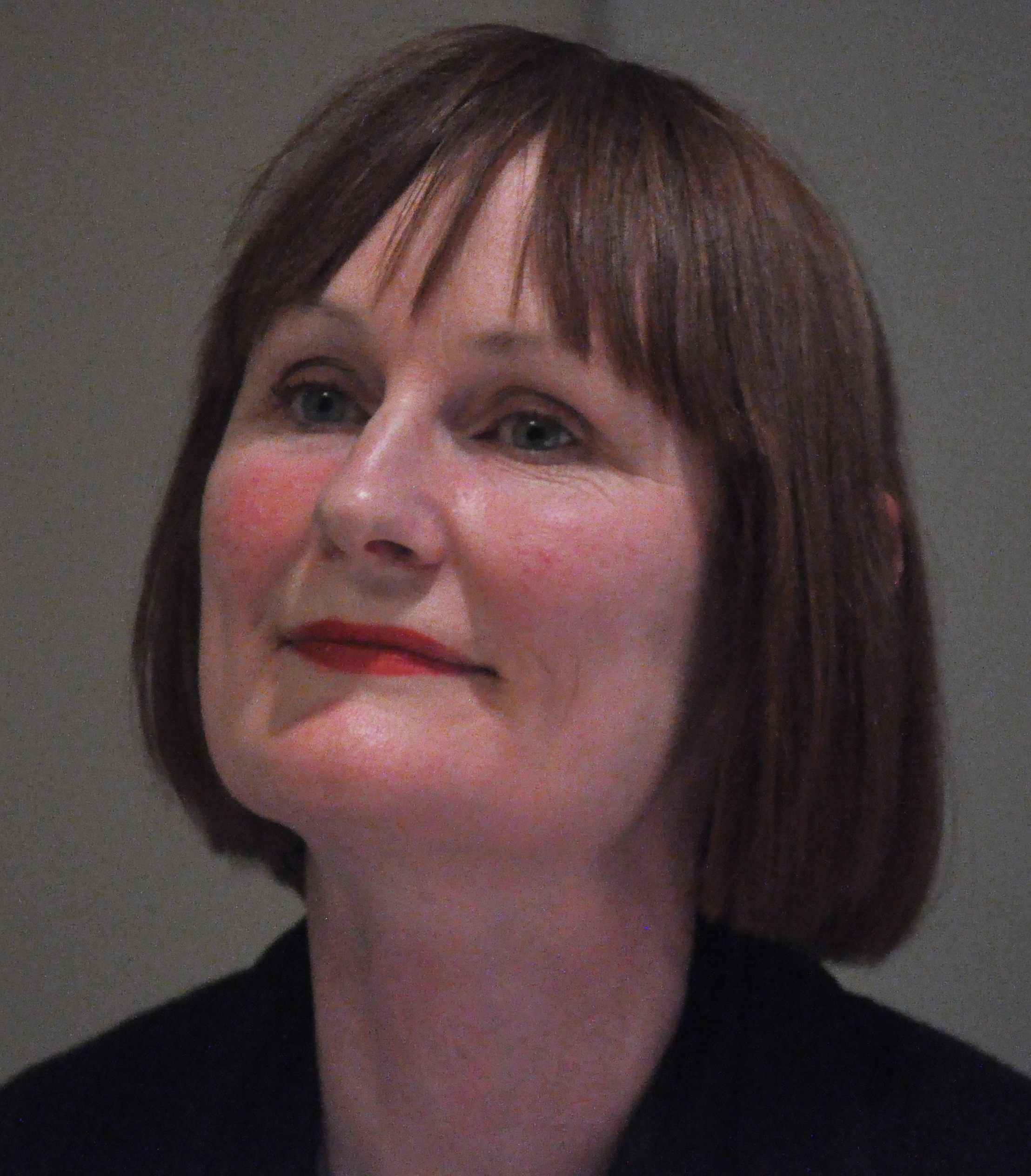
O'Brien was criticized for focusing more on Madonna's albums than her personal life in Madonna: Like an Icon.

Madonna: Like an Icon was released on 27 August 2007, in the United Kingdom by Bantam Press. It was translated into 13 languages. The book cover was designed by Holly MacDonald, with an image of Madonna from 2002, during the premiere of her film, Swept Away. It was released more than a year later in the United States. The biography faced mixed reviews from critics. Sarah Churchwell from The Guardian criticized O'Brien's extended commentary about Madonna's recording process. She believed that more emphasis should have been given on Madonna's personal life as well. Pointing out examples like Madonna's relationship with actor Warren Beatty, which was widely covered in the media but was only lightly touched in the book, Churchwell wondered about the claim of the book in its press release: "This is the closest you will ever come to Madonna's autobiography". The reviewer concluded by saying, "Since her voice is nowhere in evidence, this book, however capable and intelligent its writer, is probably about the farthest you will ever get from Madonna's autobiography."

Ken Barnes from USA Today noted that major events in Madonna's life were repeated throughout the book. He complimented O'Brien's writing style, especially the portions chronicling the death of Madonna's mother, as well as dissecting the recording process of the albums and the development of her concert tours. He concluded by saying that overall the biography seemed "too familiar. Maybe that's because, at least since she hit the mass-culture spotlight in 1983 with 'Holiday' and hijacked it wholesale the next year with 'Like a Virgin' and 'Material Girl', Madonna, now 49, has lived her life in public like few other artists. The records, tours and videos have been thoroughly documented, as have the liaisons and the controversies (from the Sex book all the way up to the Malawi orphan adoption)." Lyn Barber from The Daily Telegraph gave a negative review of the book, calling it far inferior to author J. Randy Taraborrelli's Madonna: An Intimate Biography, released in 2002. Like Churchwell, Barber did not understand why over-emphasis was given on the singer's albums, leaving out details about her personal life. The reviewer listed one positive aspect of the book, the info on Madonna's childhood and a detailed insight into her family. She concluded by saying, "[Madonna] remains one of the most fascinating women of our time but not, alas, in this pedestrian account."

== Publication history ==
Region	Release date	Format
United Kingdom	27 August 2007	Hardcover
United Kingdom	27 August 2007	Paperback
United States	30 December 2008	Hardcover
United States	13 October 2009	Kindle
