= Lucy O'Brien =

British journalist and writer

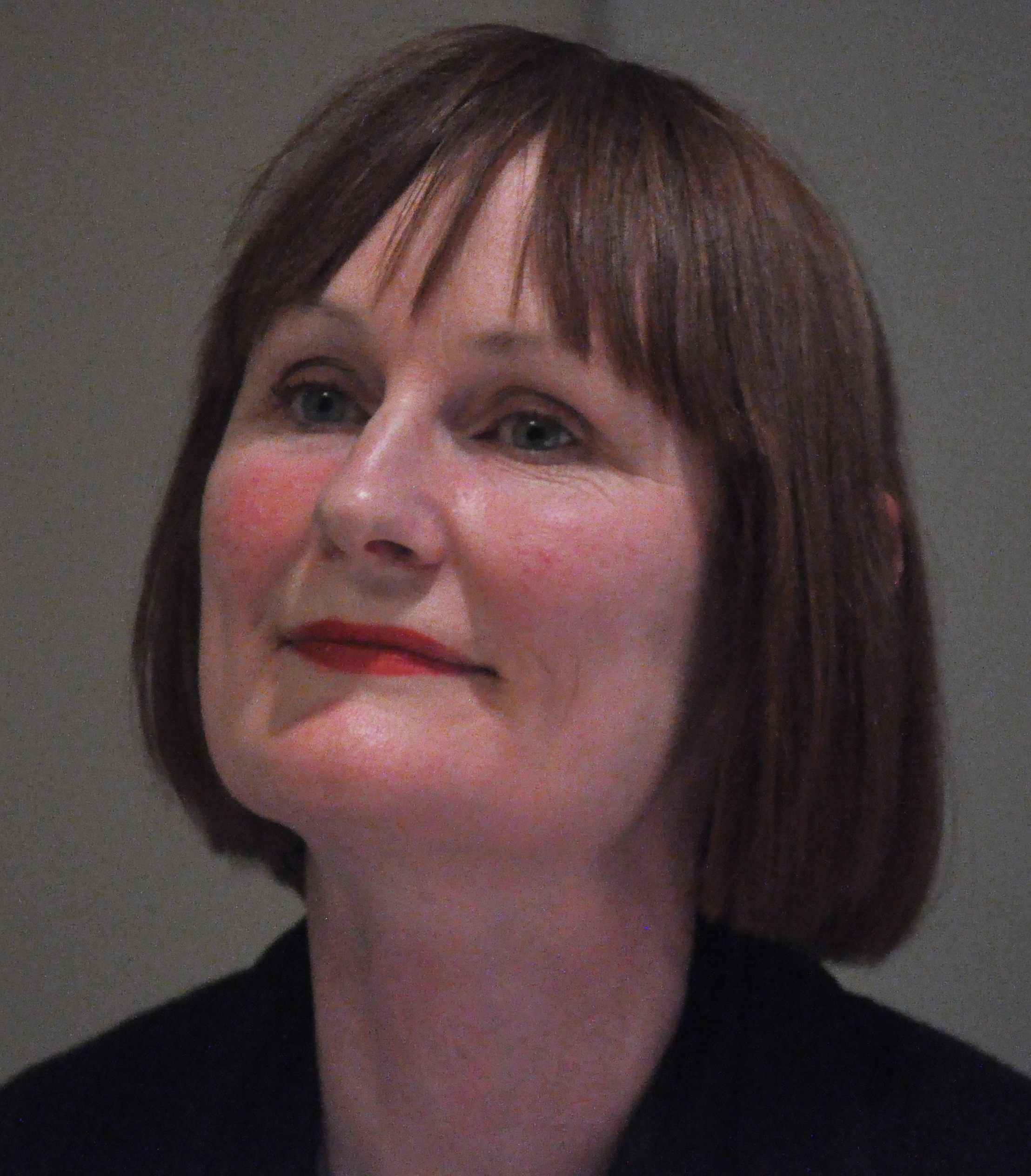
- O'Brien in 2012
- Born: 13 September 1961 (age 64); Catford, London, United Kingdom
- Education: University of Brighton (PhD); University of London (HEA); University of Leeds (BA)
- Occupations: Journalist; Writer
- Years active: 1980s
- Notable work: Madonna: Like an Icon (2007); Lead Sister: The Story of Karen Carpenter (2023)
- Website: https://lucyobrien.co.uk/

Lucy O'Brien (born 13 September 1961) is a British author and journalist whose work focuses on women in music.

== Early musical and writing career ==
O'Brien was born in Catford, London and grew up in Southampton. In 1979, whilst attending a convent school in Southampton, she formed a punk band aptly named "the Catholic Girls". She left the band in 1980 to attend university in Leeds, and The Catholic Girls continued for a while under the name Almost Cruelty before splitting up.

At university she played with a number of bands before giving up performing to write instead. She became music editor of the University of Leeds magazine, Leeds Student, and after graduating in 1983, she submitted gig articles to the music paper the New Musical Express (NME), which then published Charles Shaar Murray and Nick Kent. She has since written about the "intimidating" office culture at NME in the 1980s, and the extent to which female music journalists were ostracised and not taken seriously by the paper. Her best-known contribution to the paper may be the notorious "Youth Suicide" cover article.

Forming an alliance with fellow soul and socialism heads Stuart Cosgrove and Paolo Hewitt, O'Brien became part of a leftist faction at NME which was eventually discharged by incoming editor Alan Lewis – an IPC troubleshooter instructed to de-politicise the magazine and boost sales.

During her early years at NME, O'Brien also wrote for the feminist magazine, Spare Rib, whose offices she had first visited in 1980. In 1984 she co-wrote a cover story for them about women in the music industry. She was shocked to discover just how few women had record deals or were in the charts compared to men and this discovery would inspire her later work, particularly She Bop.

After leaving NME, O'Brien worked as Music Editor at the London listings magazine City Limits. It was here that she interviewed Dusty Springfield, an interview which led to her being contacted by the publishers Sidgwick & Jackson, and to her being offered the chance to write Springfield's biography.

== Freelance writing, and books ==
By 1990, O'Brien had gone freelance, going on to write for The Guardian and The Independent, and music magazines Q Magazine and MOJO, amongst others. Her reputation as a writer and commentator was seriously established by the publication of her first book Dusty – a best-selling biography of British singer Dusty Springfield (Sidgwick & Jackson, 1989). The book was instrumental in the rediscovery and reappraisal of Springfield's work, and was the foundation for O'Brien's reputation as an authority on female artists and soul music.

Her next music biography, Annie Lennox (St Martin's Press, 1993), was also published in the United States. O'Brien charted Annie Lennox's career from the early troubled days of The Tourists through to the global success of Eurythmics to Lennox's decision to take a pop sabbatical at the height of her career to work on behalf of the homeless.

In 1995, O'Brien took a broader look at female musicians in She Bop: The Definitive History Of Women In Rock, Pop & Soul (Pan, 1995). Using a personal, polemical, and thematic approach, the book begins with the Blues and Jazz Age, and ends with chapters on protest pop and the business side of the music business.

The second edition of Dusty appeared in 1999 and covered events up to Springfield's death, while the updated She Bop II was published in 2002 by Continuum Press, including more recent artists and a chapter on girl power.

In 2007, O'Brien wrote an in-depth biography of Madonna, entitled Madonna: Like an Icon. This was published on 28 August 2007 in the UK and later, on 6 November 2007, in the USA.

== Television and radio ==
O'Brien's books, including She Bop, have led to frequent television appearances as an authority on rock music. These include appearances on Channel 4's Top Ten... franchise, and work for BBC2's The Ozone in the late 1990s (including a feature exploring the concept of girl power, and an interview with Yoko Ono) amongst others. O'Brien also co-produced the Channel 4 documentary Righteous Babes, on rock and new feminism, and in 2002 adapted She Bop II as a two-part documentary for BBC Radio 2.

== Bibliography ==
- Dusty, London: Sidgwick & Jackson, 1989
- Annie Lennox, London: Sidgwick & Jackson, 1991
- She Bop: The definitive history of women in rock, pop, and soul, London: Penguin, 1995
- Dusty, London: Sidgwick & Jackson, 1999 (paperpack, new edition, updated)
- She Bop II: The definitive history of women in rock, pop, and soul, London/New York: Continuum, 2002
- Madonna: Like an Icon, London: HarperCollins, 2007 (paperback edition 2008)
- It Takes Bloods and Guts, written with the subject, Skin, Simon & Schuster, 2020 ISBN 978-1471194917
- Lead Sister: The Story of Karen Carpenter, London: Bonnier Books, 2023 ISBN 978-1788708241

== Essay Collections ==
- A kiss in the dreamhouse in Aizelwood, John (ed), Love Is The Drug, London: Penguin, 1994
- Sisters of swing in Cooper, Sarah (ed), Girls! Girls! Girls!, London: Cassell, 1995
- The Year Skunk Broke in Evans, Liz (ed), Girls Will Be Boys: Women Report On Rock, London: Pandora, 1997
- The Woman Punk Made Me in Sabin, Roger (ed), Punk Rock; So What?, London/New York: Routledge, 1999
  - O'Brien was also an interviewee in Helen Reddington's (aka: Helen McCookerybook)book The Lost Women of Music: Female Musicians Of The Punk Era, which was published by Ashgate Publishing in 2007.
