= You Can Dance =

Remix album by Madonna
- Released: November 16, 1987
- Recorded: 1982–1987
- Genre: Dance
- Length: 48:51 (vinyl); 72:57 (cassette); 68:38 (CD)
- Labels: Sire; Warner Bros.
- Producers: Madonna; Jellybean; Stephen Bray; Marty Callner; Mark Kamins; Patrick Leonard; Reggie Lucas; Nile Rodgers

Madonna chronology
Who's That Girl (1987)	You Can Dance (1987)	Like a Prayer (1989)

Singles from You Can Dance
- 1. "Spotlight" Released: April 25, 1988

You Can Dance is the first remix album by American singer and songwriter Madonna. It was released on November 16, 1987, in the UK and November 17, 1987, in the US by Sire Records. The album contains remixes of tracks from her first three studio albums—Madonna (1983), Like a Virgin (1984) and True Blue (1986)—and a new track, "Spotlight". In the 1980s, remixing was still a new concept. The mixes on You Can Dance exhibited a number of typical mixing techniques. Instrumental passages were lengthened to increase the time for dancing and vocal phrases were repeated and subjected to multiple echoes. The album cover denoted Madonna's continuous fascination with Hispanic culture.

After its release, You Can Dance received generally positive reviews from critics, some of whom noted how the already known songs appeared to them in a complete new structure, calling it an essential album to be played at parties. You Can Dance was a commercial success, earning a platinum certification from the Recording Industry Association of America (RIAA) for shipment of a million copies, and reaching the top twenty of the Billboard 200. It reached the top ten of the album charts of France, Japan, Netherlands, New Zealand, Norway and the United Kingdom.

It went on to sell five million copies worldwide, making it the second best-selling remix album of all time, behind only Blood on the Dance Floor from Michael Jackson. "Spotlight" was the only commercial single released from the album, exclusively in Japan. However, the song was released promotionally in the United States, and due to radio play, the song peaked at number 32 on the US Billboard Hot 100 Airplay chart. You Can Dance has been credited for setting the standard with remix albums afterward, both in terms of concept and commercial success on record charts.

== Background ==
In October 1986, Sire Records announced that a 6-track EP called You Can Dance would be released a month or so before Christmas of that year, and would feature the new track "Spotlight" alongside remixes of five other previously released songs. However, the following month, the release was postponed, with Sire opting to continue promotion of Madonna's third studio album True Blue (1986). Billboard reported that the release was "still in the production stages" and that it would likely see a release in the spring of 1987. Billboard also confirmed which remixes would be featured on the release and added that a non-remixed song from Madonna (1983) would also be included, which was "likely" to be "Physical Attraction". The album was finally released in November 1987 by Warner Bros. Records and Sire Records.

You Can Dance was Madonna's first retrospective release and was aimed at the dance segment of her audience. By the mid-eighties, post-disco dance music was extremely popular and the concept of remix was widely regarded as a new direction of music. Improvements in studio technologies meant the possibility of shaping a song in new ways after it had been recorded. A particular vocal phrase could be endlessly copied, repeated, chopped up, transposed up and down in pitch and given more echo, reverberation, treble or bass.

== Development ==
"The first mix I did for her was 'True Blue.' [...] A month or two months later, Craig Kostich (then-Head of Dance Music at Warner Bros. Records) called and said, 'How would you like to mix 'Into the Groove' for You Can Dance?' I was, like, jumping-up-and-down excited for that."

— Shep Pettibone talking about working on the album.

Six of Madonna's previously released tracks were chosen for the release: "Holiday", "Everybody" and "Physical Attraction" from Madonna (1983), "Into the Groove" and "Over and Over" from Like a Virgin (1984), and "Where's the Party" from True Blue (1986). Along with the previously released tracks, the never-before released song "Spotlight" was included as the album's opening track. Written by Madonna, Stephen Bray and Curtis Hudson, "Spotlight" was originally recorded during the True Blue recording sessions. You Can Dance was also the first North American-released Madonna album that contained "Into the Groove", which was only included on international reissues of Like a Virgin in 1985.

Sequencing for the album was provided by Madonna's old friend and producer John "Jellybean" Benitez. Benitez also provided remix production for the songs "Spotlight" and "Holiday". Benitez said that he had always wanted to remix "Holiday". Shep Pettibone remixed "Where's The Party" and "Into the Groove" on You Can Dance and had previously remixed Madonna's 1986 single "True Blue" for its single release. Pettibone said that he was "overjoyed" to have been asked to remix "Into the Groove", noting: "When I was mixing 'True Blue', I was wishing it could be 'Into the Groove'". Of the seven tracks on You Can Dance, "Physical Attraction" was the only song that was not remixed for the release.

The album cover denoted Madonna's continued fascination with Spanish culture and fashion. She wore a female toreador outfit with a lacy bustier, embroidered bolero jacket and a cummerbund with a flouncy bustle. Jeri Heiden, who had worked on the cover art for True Blue, was given the task of editing the photos and making them compatible for appearance in an album cover. Shot by Herb Ritts, the cover showed Madonna again as a platinum blonde. Heiden explained in an interview with Aperture magazine in October 2006 that the cover was not meant to be a tie-in with the True Blue cover. "It was just Madonna's look at the time – Platinum Blonde. And of course the handwriting reappears on that album." The album sleeve included a free poster and the gold wrap-around liner notes contained approximate running time to indicate the difference between the length of the remix and the original track. Brian Chin, a Rolling Stone journalist, wrote the liner notes for the album, explaining the process of remix and why the songs were chosen for the track list.

== Composition ==
"Spotlight"
A 20 second sample of "Spotlight", featuring the chorus with Madonna singing the line "Spotlight, open up your eyes and see".

According to Rikky Rooksby, author of The Complete Guide to the Music of Madonna, "Improvements in studio technology meant that possibilities for shaping the sound after it has been recorded are almost limitless." The mixes on You Can Dance exhibited a number of typical mixing techniques. Instrumental passages were lengthened to increase the time for dancing, which undermined the tighter structure of the original pop song. Vocal phrases were repeated and subjected to multiple echoes, panned across the stereophonic sound outlets. At certain points, almost no music is heard except the drums and at others, the drums are removed with only the hi-hat left to keep time. The first song on the album is "Spotlight" which begins with the sound of drums, bass synths and handclaps, followed by Madonna uttering the words "Spotlight, shine bright". After the first verse, the sound of keyboard is heard during the chorus. It continues like this through the second verse, which is followed by an interlude featuring vocal echoes, a piano segment and violin phrases. Madonna follows the music played by the piano and utters the words "Pa-da-pa-da-pappa pappa pa pa" in the same melody. The lyrics deal with Madonna making the listener remember that "everybody is a star" and that if one wants to be famous and be under the "spotlight", the person should sing about it and reality may catch up with him or her. According to the sheet music for the song, is set in the time signature of common time, with a tempo of 100 beats per minute. It is set in the key of F major with Madonna's voice spanning from the notes of C_{5} to B♭_{5}. "Spotlight" has a basic sequence of Am–C–Am–C–G–F as its chord progression.

The second track is "Holiday", which Benitez said that he always wanted to remix, commenting "There are new sounds on the 1987 remix [of 'Holiday'], but it had a groove that needed no improvement." The sound of the guitar is brought to the front in the remix, with a piano break and a middle section consisting of drum beats. The mix for "Everybody" starts with four repetitions of the vocal hook and then moves into a rhythm centered arrangement. Like "Holiday", the middle section of "Everybody" features a drum break, with a synth tune backing it up. The word "dance" is echoed and slowed-down continuously through the break, gradually changing into the intermedia verse. At the very end, the drums are pulled out, leaving Madonna repeating the "get up and do your thing" phrase, which hovers over to the intro of the next song "Physical Attraction". In the "Into the Groove" remix, overdubs are present with the continuous repetition of the phrase "c'mon". The first verse does not start until about ninety seconds into the remix. After the first "Now I know you're mine" line is sung, there is a percussion break, and repetition of the phrases "step to the beat" and "c'mon". The last verse incorporates echoing on the vocals, causing overlap of the phrases. The remix ends with instrumentation from congas, whistles and timbales, giving it a Mexican-influenced ending.

== Promotion ==
Compared to her previous releases, Madonna did not heavily promote You Can Dance. Radio-friendly edits of each song were issued promotionally on a release titled You Can Dance (Single Edits of Album Remixes). This release remained promotional-only until it received a commercial digital release in 2022. "Spotlight" was released as the album's only commercial single on April 25, 1988, exclusively in Japan. "Spotlight" peaked at number 68 on the Oricon weekly singles chart, remaining on the chart for five weeks. It also charted on the Oricon international singles chart, reaching a peak of three on May 19, 1988, staying on the chart for ten weeks.

"Spotlight" was not released as a commercial single in the United States, therefore it was not eligible at the time to appear on Billboard's Hot 100. However, it was released as a promotional single, paired with "Where's The Party". "Spotlight" managed to garner enough airplay to appear on the publication's Hot 100 Airplay chart in early 1988. It debuted on the chart at 37 on the issue dated January 16, 1988. After three weeks, "Spotlight" reached a peak of 32 and fell to 40 the next week before exiting the chart. It also appeared on the Hot Crossover 30 chart beginning on the issue dated December 12, 1987, peaking at 15 for two consecutive weeks beginning January 9, 1988 and spending eight weeks on the chart.

== Critical reception ==
Contemporaneous reviews
Review scores
Source	Rating
Entertainment Weekly	B+
Los Angeles Times	3/4 stars
Hartford Advocate	3/5 stars
The Gazette	3/5 stars
NME	9/10 (side two)
The Philadelphia Inquirer	3/4 stars
The Village Voice	A−

You Can Dance received generally positive reviews from music critics. In The Village Voice, Robert Christgau considered that "the effects, repeats, breaks, and segues added by a star crew of remixers [...] amount to new music—this time the songs don't surface, they reach out and grab you". He also argued that You Can Dance reminded the audience that before MTV, they "loved the way she sounded". Many reviewers described the compilation as a being a good fit for playing at parties. Author J. Randy Taraborrelli noted that "You Can Dance made one point clear about Madonna. While she was evolving into a serious pop star, musically she still knew how to host the best party." Richard Harrington from The Washington Post called the album "an energetic collection of extended dance remixes, that will surely be the highlight of the party crowds flocking around the town." John Milward from USA Today felt that "although the remixes sound a little exhaustive, its nevertheless party time with Madonna's album." Jan DeKnock from the Chicago Tribune predicted that the album would be "one of the big stars of the upcoming holiday party season".

Timothy Green from The Miami Herald said that "Madonna's new album isn't really new, but rather a collection of danceable hits, remixed by club deejays masterful at that peculiar art of taking the artists' work, track by track, and reconstructing it." He also said that "the remixes sound fresh" and that they gave "a new outlook on the already famous and popular songs." Daniel Brogan from the same newspaper also praised the album, saying that "Madonna has brought a new joy to the people buying gifts for Christmas, as You Can Dance is a fun-filled, fast-paced retrospective that will burn the dance floor till New Year." In a retrospective review, Stephen Thomas Erlewine from AllMusic said that You Can Dance "keeps the spotlight on her first record." He also noted at "some of this now sounds dated—these are quite clearly extended mixes from the mid 80s—but that's part of its charm, and it all holds together quite well. Not essential, but fun."

== Commercial performance ==
In the United States, the album was released on November 18, 1987, and reached a peak of number 14 on the Billboard 200. The LP cuts debuted at number 41 on the Dance Music/Club Play chart, and moved up to number 17 the next week. The LP cuts ultimately topped the Dance chart, becoming Madonna's seventh number one entry. The album was certified Platinum by the Recording Industry Association of America (RIAA) for shipment of one million copies across the United States.

In Canada, the album debuted at number 55 on the RPM Albums Chart on December 5, 1987. After five weeks, it reached a peak of number 11 on the chart. It was present for a total of 21 weeks on the chart. In Australia, You Can Dance debuted at number 15 on the Kent Music Report albums chart, and peaked at number 13. It was certified platinum by the Australian Recording Industry Association (ARIA) for shipment of 70,000 copies of the album. You Can Dance reached a peak of number four in New Zealand.

In the United Kingdom, You Can Dance was released on November 28, 1987, and entered the UK Albums Chart and peaked at number five. It was Madonna's fifth top-ten album there present for a total of 16 weeks on the chart, and was certified platinum by the British Phonographic Industry (BPI) for shipment of 300,000 copies of the album. The album re-entered the chart at number 69, on March 4, 1995, after being released in mid-price in the United Kingdom. Across Europe, the album reached number three on the European Top 100 Albums chart, and the top five in Norway and Netherlands, while charting within the top twenty of Austria, Germany, Spain, Sweden and Switzerland. You Can Dance also reached number two in France. Worldwide, it went on to sell five million copies, becoming the second best-selling remix album of all time.

== Legacy ==
Music guides
Review scores
Source	Rating
AllMusic	3/5 stars
MusicHound Rock	2/5 stars
The Rolling Stone Album Guide	(1992) (2011)
Spin Alternative Record Guide	9/10
Tom Hull – on the Web	A
The Virgin Encyclopedia of Nineties Music	3/5 stars

An oh-so 80s phenomenon, [You Can Dance] had its genesis in the club scene, and had been particularly popular among new-wave artists such as The B-52s, Soft Cell, The Cure, and Pet Shop Boys.

— Music editor, Daryl Easlea in Madonna: Blonde ambition (2012).

Shortly after its release, Madonna was called "the most important dance artist" by a number of media outlets, and described by pan-European magazine Music & Media as "the world's most successful artist in bridging the dance and pop audiences".

Jon O'Brien from Billboard noted Madonna became "the first major pop artist" to release a hits collection with its extended 12" versions. You Can Dance is one of the first sets of remixes to be conceived as a full-length album. Matthew Rettenmund, author of Encyclopedia Madonnica (1995), complimented rather releasing a greatest-hits album, her first compilation was a "groundbreaking remix album". The entire concept of copying, repeating, pasting and playing was still in its "infancy" when Madonna released this project. Writing for Reader's Digest, Jon O'Brien stated "Madge was the first genuine superstar to realise the power of the DJ". Biographer David James commented that "Madonna broke fresh ground". Daryl Easlea, in Madonna: Blonde Ambition (2012) wrote what was particularly successful about You Can Dance, is the way the tracks were mixed into a continuous segue, further asserting that "it was very much a forerunner of today's club mixes" and that this had been happening in clubs for years, "but Madonna once again popularized a breaking wave by capturing it on vinyl".

J. Randy Taraborrelli credits Madonna for being part of jump-started the trend of releasing remix albums. According to O'Brien, Madonna "inspired generations of pop artists to rework their bops for club dance floors". Shortly after the release of You Can Dance, major acts of the day were following suit with their own, including Bobby Brown's Dance!...Ya Know It!, New Kids on the Block's No More Games/The Remix Album, Jody Watley's You Wanna Dance with Me? and Paula Abdul's Shut Up and Dance: Mixes contributing to the perception that dance remix albums weren't viewed as "rarities". Steffanee Wang from Nylon slightly noted its influence on Club Future Nostalgia by Dua Lipa. Kelefa Sanneh in Major Labels: A History of Popular Music in Seven Genres (2021) describes how she "released a type of record that many of her fans had probably never previously encountered". Despite this, the album was well received by fans.

Other retrospective assessments specifically praised its impact as a remix album on record charts. Rob Copsey from the Official Charts Company stated that it "set the bar for how it should be done". Commercially, Easlea wrote that while the record missed out on the US top 10, it still managed to sell more than a million copies—"no mean feat" for a material that had "largely been previously released elsewhere". Its worldwide results led to it becoming the best-selling remix album for nearly ten years until the release of Blood on the Dance Floor: HIStory in the Mix by Michael Jackson.

=== Accolades ===
According to Wang, You Can Dance is one of the first major remix albums in pop music. The album was described as "groundbreaking" by Sal Cinquemani of Slant and O'Brien, the latter of whom compared its impact to the likes of Like a Prayer and Ray of Light. Music critic Robert Christgau called both You Can Dance and The Immaculate Collection "stunning" records, while the staff of Rolling Stone called both compilations "perfect Madonna" albums.

You Can Dance made appearances on a number of year-end and best-of lists by publications such as Cash Box, Los Angeles Times and The Village Voice. Upon release, the record was chosen as "album of the week" by Music & Media, issued on November 28, 1987. The same publication named it "The Dance Record of the Year". Lucinda Prince of the Australian website Cool Accident listed the compilation as one of the "Best 5 Pop Remix Albums".

== Track listing ==
Vinyl edition
No.	Title	Writer(s)	Remixer(s)	Length
1.	"Spotlight"	Madonna; Stephen Bray; Curtis Hudson	John "Jellybean" Benitez	6:23
2.	"Holiday"	Hudson; Lisa Stevens	Benitez	6:32
3.	"Everybody"	Madonna	Bruce Forest; Frank Heller	6:43
4.	"Physical Attraction"	Reggie Lucas	—	6:20
5.	"Over and Over"	Madonna; Bray	Steve Thompson; Michael Barbiero	7:11
6.	"Into the Groove"	Madonna; Bray	Shep Pettibone	8:26
7.	"Where's the Party"	Madonna; Bray; Patrick Leonard	Pettibone	7:16
Total length:				48:51

CD edition bonus tracks
No.	Title	Writer(s)	Remixer(s)	Length
8.	"Holiday" (Dub version)	Hudson; Stevens	Benitez	6:56
9.	"Into the Groove" (Dub version)	Madonna; Bray	Pettibone	6:23
10.	"Where's the Party" (Dub version)	Madonna; Bray; Leonard	Pettibone	6:20
Total length:				68:38

Cassette edition
No.	Title	Length
1.	"Spotlight"	6:23
2.	"Holiday"	6:32
3.	"Everybody"	6:43
4.	"Physical Attraction"	6:20
5.	"Spotlight" (Dub version)	4:50
6.	"Holiday" (Dub version)	6:56
7.	"Over and Over"	7:16
8.	"Into the Groove"	8:26
9.	"Where's the Party"	6:23
10.	"Over and Over" (Dub version)	6:45
11.	"Into the Groove" (Dub version)	6:23
Total length:		72:57

You Can Dance (Single Edits of Album Remixes)
No.	Title	Length
1.	"Spotlight" (Single Edit)	4:33
2.	"Holiday" (Single Edit)	4:14
3.	"Everybody" (Single Edit)	4:36
4.	"Physical Attraction" (Single Edit)	3:55
5.	"Over and Over" (Single Edit)	3:57
6.	"Into the Groove" (Single Edit)	4:48
7.	"Where's the Party" (Single Edit)	4:12
Total length:		30:15

== Personnel ==
Credits adapted as per the You Can Dance LP liner notes.

- Madonna – vocals
- Michael Barbiero – remixing, additional production
- John "Jellybean" Benitez – sequencing, remixing, additional production
- Stephen Bray – producer (previously unreleased track)
- Bruce Forest – remixing, additional production
- Frank Heller – remixing, additional production
- Michael Ostin – executive producer
- Shep Pettibone – editing, remixing, additional production
- Steve Thompson – remixing, additional production
- David Cole – keyboard
- Glenn Rosenstein – sound engineer
- Michael Hutchinson – remixing, additional production
- Jeri Heiden – art direction, cover art design
- Herb Ritts – cover art photographer
- Brian Chin – liner notes

== Charts ==
=== Weekly charts ===
Weekly chart peaks of You Can Dance during 1987–1989
Chart (1987–1989)	Peak position
Argentine Albums (CAPIF)	7
Australia (Kent Music Report)	13
Austrian Albums (Ö3 Austria)	13
Brazilian Albums (Nopem/ABPD)	4
Canada Top Albums/CDs (RPM)	11
Canadian Albums (The Record)	9
Dutch Albums (Album Top 100)	3
European Top 100 Albums (Music & Media)	3
Finnish Albums (Suomen virallinen lista)	6
French Albums (SNEP)	2
German Albums (Offizielle Top 100)	13
Icelandic Albums (Tónlist)	5
Italian Albums (Musica e Dischi)	1
Japanese Albums (Oricon)	5
Japanese International Albums (Oricon)	1
New Zealand Albums (RMNZ)	4
Norwegian Albums (VG-lista)	5
Singaporean Western Albums (IFPI)	2
Spanish Albums (AFYVE)	16
Swedish Albums (Sverigetopplistan)	10
Swiss Albums (Schweizer Hitparade)	11
UK Albums (Official Charts)	5
UK Dance Albums (Music Week)	4
US Billboard 200	14
US Dance Club Songs (Billboard) LP cuts from album	1
US Cash Box Top Albums	16
Uruguayan Albums (CUD)	7

Weekly chart peaks of You Can Dance during 2006–2022
Charts (1992—2022)	Peak position
Croatian International Albums (HDU)	3
Danish Albums (Hitlisten)	69
Hungarian Albums (MAHASZ)	29
Italian Albums (FIMI)	84
Scottish Albums (Official Charts)	59
UK Album Downloads (Official Charts) Single edits	36
US Top Dance Albums (Billboard)	13

=== Year-end charts ===
1987 year-end chart performance of You Can Dance
Chart (1987)	Position
Dutch Albums (Album Top 100)	75
French Albums (SNEP)	26
Norway Christmas Period (VG-lista)	14
UK Albums (Gallup)	43

1988 year-end chart performance of You Can Dance
Chart (1988)	Position
Canada Top Albums/CDs (RPM)	81
European Top 100 Albums (Music & Media)	39
Norway Winter Period (VG-lista)	20
US Billboard 200	82
US Dance Club Songs (Billboard) LP cuts from album	44

== Certifications and sales ==
Region	Certification	Certified units/sales
Argentina (CAPIF)	Gold	30,000^{^}
Australia (ARIA)	Platinum	70,000^{^}
Brazil (Pro-Música Brasil)	Gold	248,250
France (SNEP)	Platinum	300,000^{*}
Germany (BVMI)	Gold	250,000^{^}
Hong Kong (IFPI Hong Kong)	Platinum	20,000^{*}
Israel	—	15,000
Italy	—	450,000
Japan	—	184,560
Netherlands (NVPI)	Gold	50,000^{^}
New Zealand (RMNZ)	Platinum	15,000^{^}
Portugal (AFP)	Gold	20,000^{^}
Singapore	—	25,000 (Note: First-day sales for You Can Dance in Singapore.)
Spain (Promusicae)	Platinum	100,000^{^}
Sweden (GLF)	Gold	50,000^{^}
Switzerland (IFPI Switzerland)	Gold	25,000
United Kingdom (BPI)	Platinum	300,000^{^}
United States (RIAA)	Platinum	1,500,000
Summaries
Worldwide	—	5,000,000
^{*} Sales figures based on certification alone.^{^} Shipments figures based on certification alone.

== See also ==
- List of number-one dance singles of 1988 (U.S.)

== Book sources ==
- Bego, Mark (2000). Madonna: Blonde Ambition. Cooper Square Press. ISBN 0-8154-1051-4.
- Morton, Andrew (2002). Madonna. Macmillan Publishers. ISBN 0-312-98310-7.
- Rooksby, Rikky (2004). The Complete Guide to the Music of Madonna. Omnibus Press. ISBN 0-7119-9883-3.
- Schilling, Mark (1997). The Encyclopedia of Japanese pop culture. University of Michigan. ISBN 0-8348-0380-1.
- Taraborrelli, Randy J. (2002). Madonna: An Intimate Biography. Simon & Schuster. ISBN 978-1-4165-8346-2.
- Voller, Debbie (1999). Madonna: The Style Book. Omnibus Press. ISBN 0-7119-7511-6.
