= True Blue (album) =

1986 studio album by Madonna

Studio album by Madonna
- Released: June 30, 1986
- Recorded: December 1985 – April 1986
- Studio: Channel (Los Angeles)
- Genres: Pop; dance-pop
- Length: 40:20
- Labels: Sire; Warner Bros.
- Producers: Madonna; Stephen Bray; Patrick Leonard

Madonna chronology
Like a Virgin & Other Big Hits! (1985)	True Blue (1986)	Who's That Girl (1987)

Singles from True Blue
- 1. "Live to Tell" Released: March 26, 1986; 2. "Papa Don't Preach" Released: June 11, 1986; 3. "True Blue" Released: September 29, 1986; 4. "Open Your Heart" Released: November 12, 1986; 5. "La Isla Bonita" Released: February 25, 1987

True Blue is the third studio album by American singer and songwriter Madonna. It was released on June 30, 1986, by Sire Records. Madonna had greater control over the creative direction of True Blue than on her second studio album, Like a Virgin (1984), as she attempted to establish herself as a serious artist and appeal to a broader, more mature audience.

Madonna recorded the album in 1985 and 1986 and collaborated with Patrick Leonard and Stephen Bray on both writing and production. She had previously worked with the latter on Like a Virgin. True Blue marked the first time she co-wrote and co-produced every track on an album. Its themes—primarily love, romance, marriage, and devotion—draw in part on her personal life and her marriage to actor Sean Penn. Musically, True Blue is a pop and dance-pop album with a soundscape characterized by synthesizers, strings, guitars, drum machines, and backing vocal arrangements, influenced by the Motown sound, girl groups, and Latin pop.

Madonna promoted True Blue with the Who's That Girl World Tour, the second highest-grossing female concert tour of 1987. Five singles supported the album: the US Billboard Hot 100 number-ones "Live to Tell", "Papa Don't Preach", and "Open Your Heart", as well as the top-five entries "True Blue" and "La Isla Bonita". An immediate global success, True Blue topped the charts in a record-breaking twenty-eight countries worldwide and received multi-platinum certifications across the Americas, Europe, and the Asia–Pacific region. In the United States, it remained atop the Billboard 200 for five consecutive weeks and was certified septuple platinum by the Recording Industry Association of America.

On its release, music critics acclaimed True Blue; they particularly praised Madonna's maturity as a vocalist, songwriter, and producer. Retrospectively, the album has been regarded as an archetype of popular music from the 1980s. It is credited with solidifying her position as the most commercially successful female pop superstar of the decade and establishing her credibility as an artist. Globally, True Blue was the best-selling album of 1986 and the best-selling album of the 1980s by a female artist. It remains Madonna's best-selling studio album and one of the best-selling albums of all time, with sales exceeding 25 million copies worldwide.

== Background ==
American singer and songwriter Madonna released her sophomore album, Like a Virgin, in 1984. She selected all of the songs herself, five of which she wrote or co-wrote. It became her first number-one album in Germany, Italy, the Netherlands, New Zealand, Spain, the United Kingdom, and the United States. All four of its singles reached the top five of the US Billboard Hot 100, with the lead single and title track, "Like a Virgin", becoming her first chart-topper; the second single, "Material Girl", reached number two. It has sold over 21 million copies globally, making it one of the best-selling albums of all time. However, the album was not as successful critically as it was commercially; Madonna's vocals were criticized, though Nile Rodgers's production was acclaimed. (Note: Cited to multiple sources:)

After meeting on the set of the music video for "Material Girl", Madonna and actor Sean Penn began dating in February 1985. An admirer of his work, she said they had "so much in common", and that "he [was] almost like [her] brother". After dating casually for six months, the pair married on her twenty-seventh birthday on August 16. Soon after, the newlyweds co-starred in Shanghai Surprise (1986), an adventure comedy film that became a critical and commercial failure. During her Virgin Tour in 1985, Madonna met producer Patrick Leonard, who was the tour's musical director. Once the tour ended, Madonna invited Leonard to write music with her. They met at a barbecue he hosted, during which he presented her with a song he had composed in his studio, titled "Love Makes the World Go Round". Madonna performed it at the Live Aid benefit concert in Philadelphia in July 1985.

== Recording and development ==
"I like to have control but I'm not a tyrant [...] I like to be surrounded by really talented, intelligent people who I trust, and ask them for their advice and get their input too".

— Madonna on working with Leonard and Bray on True Blue

Madonna and her collaborators, Leonard and Stephen Bray, began developing True Blue in December 1985. For the first time in her career, Madonna co-wrote and co-produced every track on the album. She had great control over the album's development and, according to Bray, was "very much in love" while recording. Madonna collaborated separately with Leonard and Bray, except on one occasion when all three came together to create "Where's the Party". According to Leonard, the recording process was informal: he typically developed a musical idea on piano, after which Madonna would write a lyric and sing it. The two would often complete one song per day. Bray said he focused on "shap[ing] things and [...] creat[ing] arrangements to show off the song[s] better".

The first song recorded for True Blue was "Open Your Heart". Co-written by Gardner Cole and Peter Rafelson, it was originally titled "Follow Your Heart" and conceived as a rock track. The song was intended for singer Cyndi Lauper. The Temptations were also offered the song but declined after hearing that Madonna was interested. After a demo was recorded, "Follow Your Heart" was submitted to Madonna's team for True Blue; Madonna and Leonard added a bassline, turning it into a dance-pop composition. Madonna also revised the lyrics, earning herself a songwriting credit, and retitled it "Open Your Heart". The pop ballad "Live to Tell" was conceived by Leonard as an instrumental for the score of Paramount's film Fire with Fire (1986). After Paramount rejected the track, he asked Madonna to write the lyrics. Madonna subsequently enlisted her former boyfriend Bray, whom she had worked with on Like a Virgin. Madonna felt that he could help her create "up-tempo songs with a classic Top 40 sensibility".

"Papa Don't Preach" was written by Brian Elliot with the intention that it be performed by a singer named Christina Dent. A demo was presented to Warner Bros. executive Michael Ostin, who played it to Madonna during the recording of True Blue; the singer was immediately interested. Elliot had been working with Dent for six months and was initially reluctant to offer the song to another artist, but ultimately agreed, later describing the prospect of Madonna recording it as "hard to resist". Madonna was drawn to the track as, according to her, it aligned with her "personal zeitgeist of standing up to male authorities". While her lyrical contributions were minimal, she received a co-writing credit. "La Isla Bonita" was initially composed as an instrumental demo by Leonard and Bruce Gaitsch for Michael Jackson. After meeting to begin work on True Blue, Leonard presented Madonna with the demo, and she wrote the lyrics while filming Shanghai Surprise (1986).

Madonna, Curtis Hudson—who co-wrote Madonna's 1983 breakthrough single "Holiday"—and Bray wrote the track "Spotlight" for the album. Although it was recorded, the song was ultimately excluded from True Blue's final track list, and later included on her first remix album, You Can Dance (1987). Development for True Blue was complete by April 1986.

== Composition ==
=== Music and lyrics ===
True Blue is regarded as Madonna's first significant musical reinvention, departing from the bubblegum pop-oriented sound of her earlier works. It is a pop and dance-pop album with songs that take influence from Latin pop, girl groups, Motown sound, and Cuban music. (Note: Sources describing True Blue as a pop and dance-pop album, with influences from Latin pop girl groups, Motown sound, and Cuban music) Their musical arrangements are characterized by synthesizers, strings, drum machines, and backing vocals, alongside the use of acoustic and electric guitar instrumentation. Some songs differ: "Papa Don't Preach" has classical and Baroque-inspired strings, and "La Isla Bonita" includes flamenco guitar, Latin percussion, and maracas. The title track draws heavily from Motown and girl-group music, and "Love Makes the World Go Round" incorporates samba-influenced rhythms. Madonna's earlier recordings featured a bright, high-pitched vocal style that critics likened to "Minnie Mouse on helium". On True Blue, she made greater use of her lower vocal register.

Described by Madonna as her "most personal" work at the time, True Blue aimed to reach a broader, more mature audience than her last two albums. Love, romance, commitment, and fidelity are the album's main themes. The title track in particular is about devotion and loyalty to a romantic partner. Biographer Andrew Morton stated that it is the only song on the album that was a "direct" tribute to Penn, though the entire album was "inspired by her feelings for him at this time". Similarly, author Lucy O'Brien wrote that her love for Penn "seep[s] into every song". "Papa Don't Preach" addresses teenage pregnancy, "Love Makes the World Go Round" promotes themes of anti-war and anti-poverty, and "Live to Tell" deals with deceit, mistrust, and trauma. Escapism is depicted through the idyllic portrayal of an imaginary tropical paradise in "La Isla Bonita" and the pursuit of enjoyment in "Where's the Party".

=== Songs ===
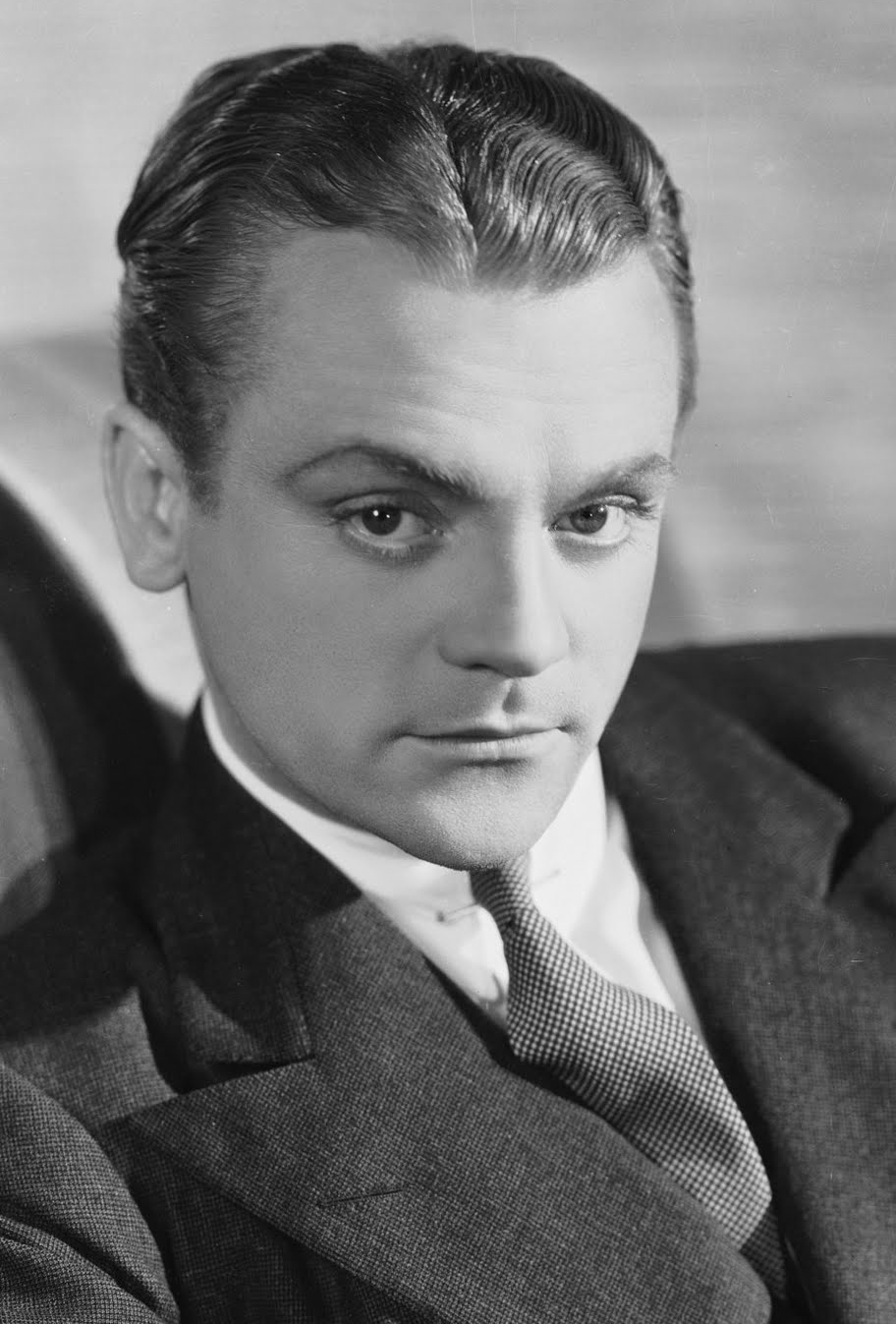
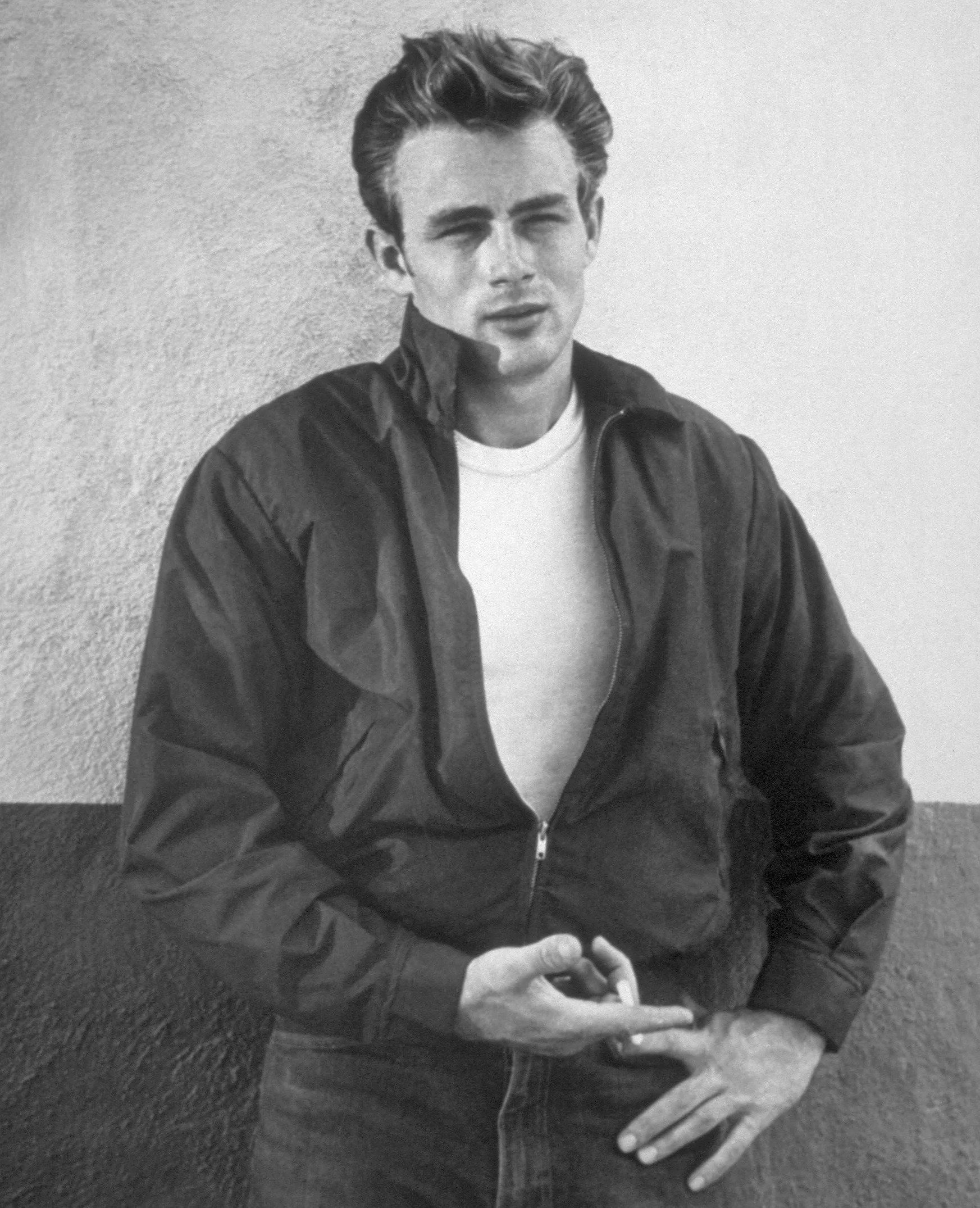
Tracks "White Heat" and "Jimmy Jimmy" were dedicated to and inspired by James Cagney (left) and James Dean (right), respectively.

True Blue opens with "Papa Don't Preach", a dance-pop song with elements of baroque pop, post-disco, classical music, and 1960s-inspired psychedelia. The lyrics are narrated from the perspective of a teenage girl who confesses to her father that she is pregnant and has chosen to keep the child. She appeals for understanding and declares her independence. Songwriter Brian Elliot stated that the lyrics told the story of a "young girl who found herself at a crossroads in life and didn't know where to turn". The second track, "Open Your Heart", is an innuendo-laden dance-pop song incorporating elements of rock and roll, with melancholic lyrics about a woman who persistently tries to persuade a resistant man to open up emotionally.

The third track, "White Heat", was dedicated to actor James Cagney and named after the 1949 film of the same name. It is an uptempo dance track featuring synth bass and double-tracked vocals, and incorporates two excerpts from the original film soundtrack—consisting of dialogue and gunshot effects—placed at the beginning and near the end. The song reinterprets the gangster film's typical focus on crime and material gain by presenting love as the central object of desire, rather than wealth or power. "Live to Tell" is a pop ballad with torch song influences, featuring instrumentation that includes keyboards, synthesizers, electric guitar, and a combination of programmed and live percussion. Lyrically, it explores themes of deception, mistrust, and the emotional burden of carrying a hidden secret while confronting a painful past.

"Where's the Party", the fifth track on True Blue, is an upbeat dance track driven by keyboards, drum machines, and a synthesizer bass, described by biographer Daryl Easlea as "the most straightforward track on the album". Its lyrics depict a person who works tirelessly throughout the week and seeks release on the dance floor during the weekend. Madonna described the song as a statement about "what it's like to be in the middle of this press stuff with everybody on my back". The album's sixth track, title song "True Blue", is the singer's tribute to her husband, Penn. It is a dance-pop love song featuring doo-wop harmonies, drawing influence from Motown and girl groups from the 1960s. Its verse–chorus structure is reminiscent of the Dixie Cups' "Chapel of Love" (1964), with backing vocalists Siedah Garrett and Edie Lehman accompanying Madonna's stylized, high-pitched vocals in a choir-like arrangement.

"La Isla Bonita" is a Latin pop dance ballad with influences from bossa nova. Its instrumentation includes flamenco guitar, Latin percussion, electronic sounds, and maracas. Lyrically, "La Isla Bonita" portrays Madonna as a woman longing for an imaginary island named San Pedro. She sings four lines in Spanish. The eighth track, "Jimmy Jimmy", is a dance-pop song with influences of Motown sound and new wave music. Its lyrics reference "a boy who comes from bad places", and were inspired in part by Madonna's childhood fascination with actor James Dean. True Blue closes with "Love Makes the World Go Round", an upbeat track with Latin drums, samba-influenced rhythms, and lyrics addressing anti-war and anti-poverty themes. Biographer Mark Bego described it as "her salute to the peace songs of the sixties" and compared it to "All You Need Is Love" (1967) by the Beatles.

== Artwork and release ==
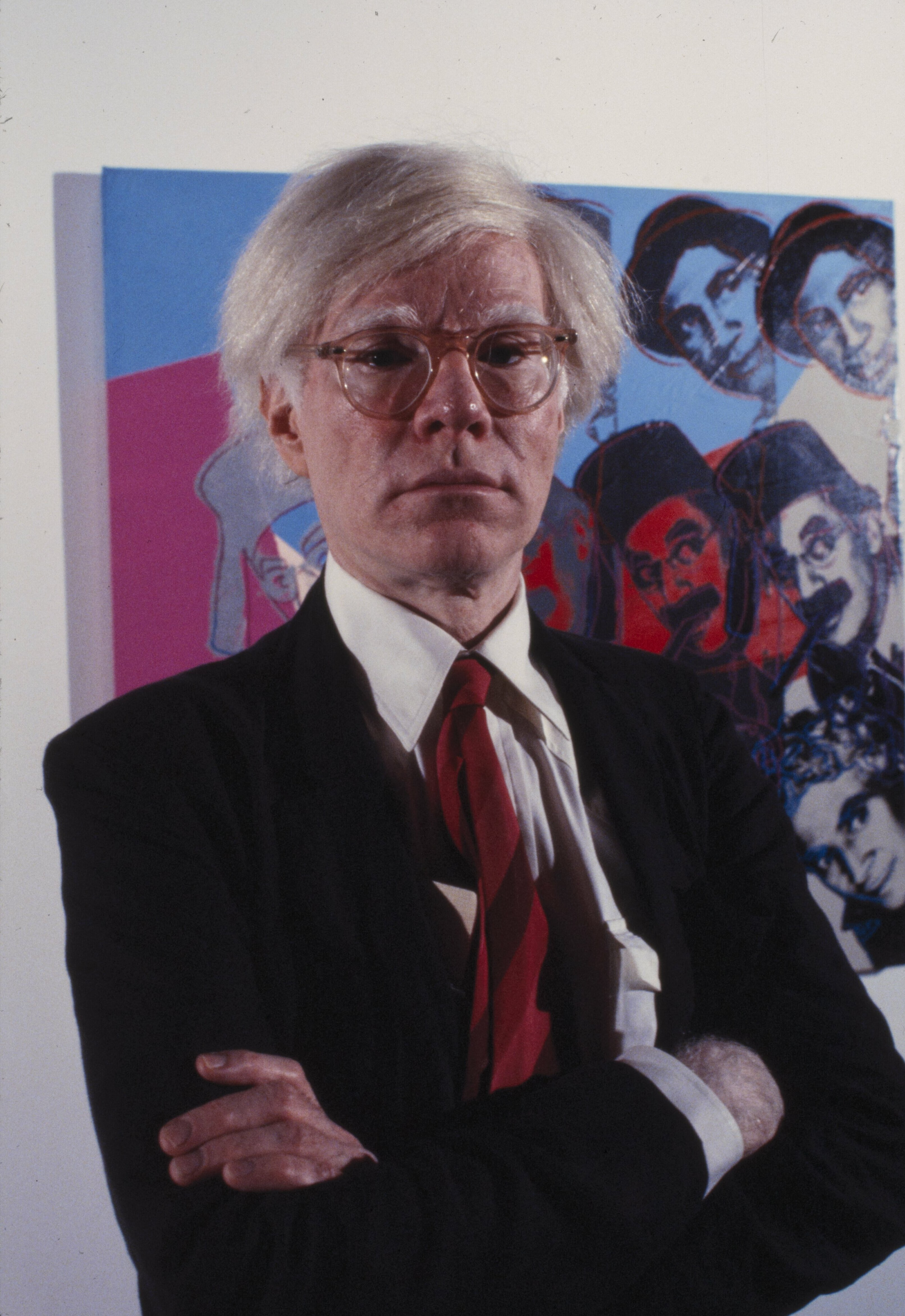
Lucy O'Brien compared the album's cover art to the work of American artist Andy Warhol (pictured).

The album cover for True Blue was photographed by Herb Ritts, with whom Madonna had previously worked on the poster of the film Desperately Seeking Susan (1985). It depicts the singer in profile, with her head tilted back and eyes closed against a sky-blue background. Her complexion appears bleached out, and her hair is styled in a platinum blonde shade. Jeri Heiden, then working in the Warner Bros. art department, was responsible for editing the photographs for use as record covers. The final image was selected by Madonna, Heiden, and Warner Bros. creative director Jeff Ayeroff. Heiden then experimented with various treatments of the original black-and-white photograph to align with the album's title, eventually producing the final blue-toned, hand-tinted version.

True Blue's inner sleeve did not include photographs, instead showing only production credits and song lyrics since, according to biographer J. Randy Taraborrelli, "Madonna may have wanted to be best represented by just her work". In the liner notes, she dedicated True Blue to Sean Penn, describing him as "the coolest guy in the universe". O'Brien described the cover as a Warholian example of pop art with its "mixture of innocence [and] idealism"; she referred to it as "our first glimpse of Madonna as a classic icon". Taraborrelli interpreted the artwork as indicative of artistic development, suggesting that True Blue was a period of growth for Madonna. He also described the "washed-out" color treatment as comparatively understated, particularly in contrast to the more overtly sexualized imagery associated with her earlier work. In 2023, Joe Lynch of Billboard ranked the cover as among the 100 greatest album artworks.

In April 1986, Billboard reported that her third album would be titled Live to Tell and was scheduled for a summer release. A month later, the title was confirmed as True Blue, named after one of Penn's favorite expressions, which Madonna described as representing a "very pure vision of love". Sire and Warner Bros. Records released True Blue on June 30, 1986. In the US and Canada, the album cover omitted Madonna's name, as her prominently featured face was considered sufficient to identify her. Heiden explained in an interview that the record company used shrink wrap for these releases, which allowed the photograph of Madonna to be revealed only after the packaging was removed. Warner Bros. included her name on European editions to maintain recognizability in those markets. In 2001, Warner Bros. issued a remastered edition of the album that included bonus tracks and remixes. True Blue was also reissued on crystal clear vinyl on November 8, 2019. A thirty-fifth anniversary edition was released on July 30, 2021, featuring further remixes as well as dub and instrumental versions. It was the first release from Madonna's "Silver Collection" reissue series.

== Promotion ==
=== Touring ===
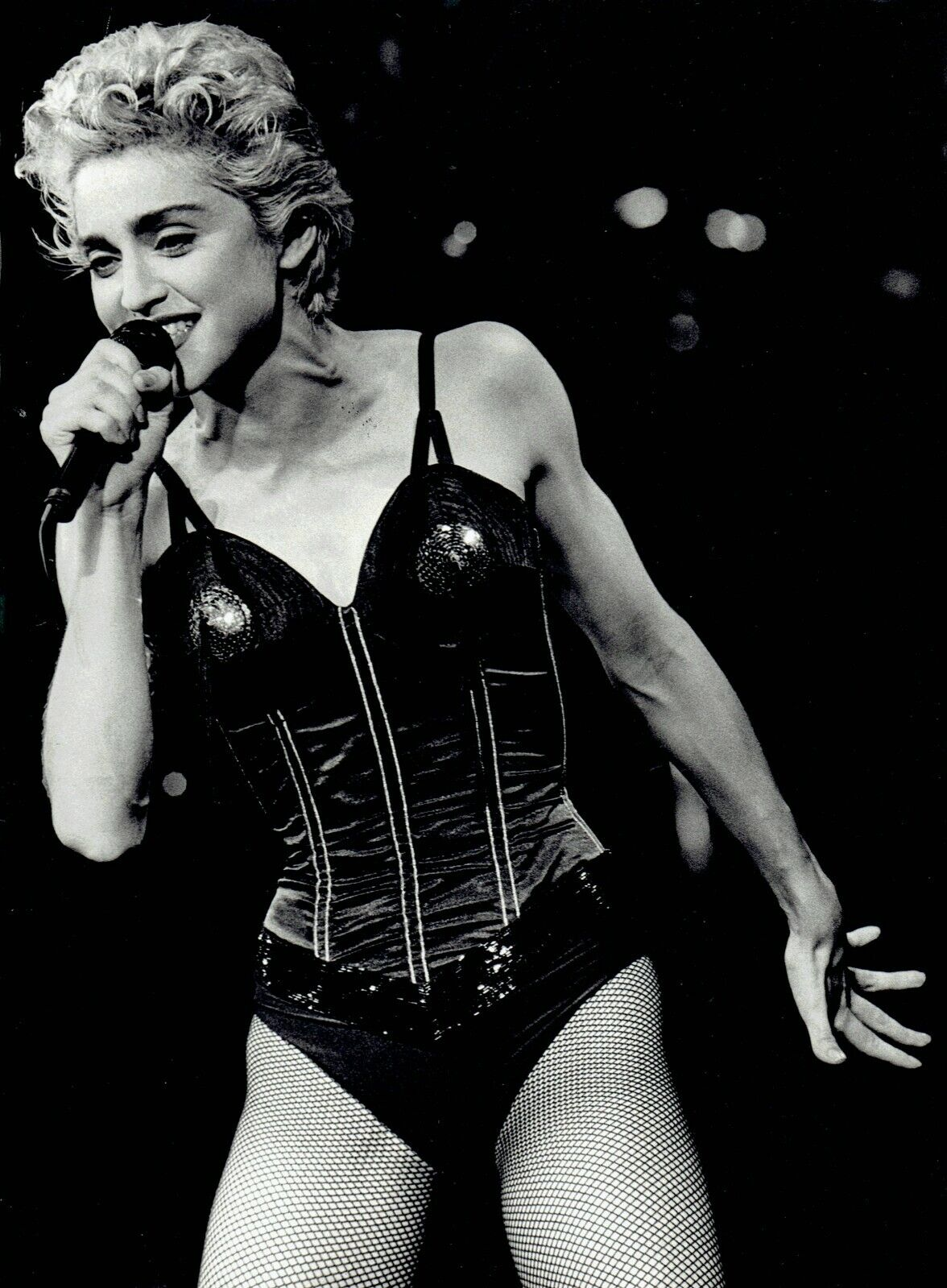
Madonna performing during the 1987 Who's That Girl World Tour

Madonna promoted True Blue with the Who's That Girl World Tour, her second concert tour; it also supported her soundtrack album Who's That Girl (1987). The tour began on June 14, 1987, in Osaka, Japan, and concluded on September 6 in Florence, Italy. It marked her first visit to Europe and Asia. The tour was more musically and technically elaborate than the Virgin Tour, with a larger stage and four large video screens as backdrops; Madonna described it as a "theatrical multimedia spectacular". In collaboration with costume designer Marlene Stewart, Madonna developed the wardrobe to bring her music video personas to the stage, recreating scenes from "True Blue", "Papa Don't Preach", and "La Isla Bonita".

The Who's That Girl World Tour was well-received, with reviewers praising the performances, Madonna's vocal delivery, and her stage presence. Her performance of "Papa Don't Preach" was Madonna's first conflict with the Vatican, as she dedicated the song to Pope John Paul II, who encouraged Italian audiences to boycott the concerts due to their sexual imagery. With a total gross revenue of $25 million (equivalent to $41.21 million in 2025), the Who's That Girl World Tour was the second highest-grossing tour by a female artist in 1987, behind Tina Turner's Break Every Rule World Tour. The tour broke several attendance records, including the highest-attended concert by a female artist at the time, with her performance near Paris garnering over 130,000 people.

=== Singles ===
True Blue was supported by five singles. The lead single, "Live to Tell", was released in the United States on March 26, 1986, and in Europe on April 14. In the US, it entered the Billboard Hot 100 at number forty. In its eighth week on the chart, it reached number one, becoming Madonna's third song to top the Hot 100. "Live to Tell" also reached number one in Canada, Greece, and Italy, and placed within the top five in the United Kingdom, Norway, Belgium, Denmark, the Netherlands, Switzerland, and Uruguay. (Note: Cited to multiple sources:) The music video, directed by James Foley, presents Madonna with a demure and understated image, drawing inspiration from classic Hollywood actresses such as Marilyn Monroe. It is intercut with scenes from the film At Close Range.

"Papa Don't Preach" was released as the second single from True Blue. Its American release occurred on June 11, with a European release five days later. Debuting at number forty-two, "Papa Don't Preach" reached number one on the Billboard Hot 100 in its seventh week, staying atop the chart for two weeks and becoming her fourth chart-topper. The song also reached number one in Australia, Belgium, Canada, Denmark, Finland, Greece, Ireland, Italy, the Netherlands, Norway, Panama, Portugal, and the United Kingdom. (Note: Cited to multiple sources:) "Papa Don't Preach" was nominated for the Grammy Award for Best Female Pop Vocal Performance. Directed by Foley, its music video follows Madonna as she struggles to tell her father about her pregnancy, intercut with footage of her singing and dancing in a black studio and during a romantic evening with her boyfriend.

The third single, "True Blue", was released in Europe on September 29, 1986, and in the United States on October 9. After opening at number forty, "True Blue" peaked at number three on the Billboard Hot 100 in its sixth week on the chart. Elsewhere, the song topped the charts in number one in Canada, Denmark, Ireland, and the United Kingdom, and reached the top five in Belgium, Italy, New Zealand, Brazil, and the Netherlands. (Note: Cited to multiple sources:) Two music videos were shot for "True Blue". The official one depicts Madonna with three backup dancers and a 1950s Ford Thunderbird convertible in an all-blue diner. An alternative version was made through MTV's "Make My Video" contest; the winning submission, directed by Angel Garcia and Cliff Guest, was shot in sepia tone and featured a teenage romance.

"Open Your Heart" was issued as the fourth single from True Blue in the United States on November 12, 1986, and in Europe on December 1. "Open Your Heart" debuted at number fifty-one on the Billboard Hot 100 and topped the chart in its ninth week. It became Madonna's fifth number-one on the chart and the third number-one from True Blue, making her the second female artist—after Whitney Houston—to score three chart-toppers from one album. The song reached the top five in Denmark, Ireland, Iceland, the United Kingdom, and Italy. (Note: Cited to multiple sources:) In the Jean-Baptiste Mondino–directed music video, the singer portrays an exotic dancer at a peep show who befriends a little boy. Critics appreciated her for depicting women as the dominant sex, but the concept of a child in a strip club received criticism.

"La Isla Bonita" was released as True Blue's fifth and final single on February 25, 1987. Entering the Billboard Hot 100 at number forty-nine, it peaked at number four in its sixth week. It topped the charts of Austria, Canada, France, Switzerland, and the United Kingdom, and reached the top five in Iceland, Ireland, Netherlands, Portugal, Belgium, Finland, Sweden, and New Zealand. (Note: Cited to multiple sources:) It became the best-performing song of 1987 in Europe. Directed by Mary Lambert, the music video for "La Isla Bonita" depicts Madonna as two different characters: a Catholic woman and a flamenco dancer. Rolling Stone liked its theatricality, and composer Rikky Rooksby opined that it was "marginally more interesting" than the song. Other reviewers accused the singer of cultural appropriation.

== Critical reception ==
=== Initial reviews ===
On release, True Blue was favorably reviewed by music critics, largely for Madonna's maturity as a vocalist, producer, and songwriter. (Note: All reviews below are from the album's release date up until the end of 1986. Reviews after this period are either in the § Retrospective commentary or § Legacy sections.) Billboard opined that she had progressed as both a writer and producer. Robert Hilburn wrote in the Los Angeles Times that, while True Blue was not revolutionary, Madonna's voice had matured, and was "so finely tailored that she actually extends the punch and appeal of the production touches". Similarly, Alan Niester wrote in The Globe and Mail that Madonna was no longer a "squeaky-voiced born-again virgin" on True Blue; he described her vocals as "huskier" and more "full-bodied". In the Orlando Sentinel, Bill Henderson stated that the album overshadowed Like a Virgin because of its "mature" and "timeless" sound, and the singer's more "focused" songwriting, describing it as "proof that the material girl has substance as well as style". Davitt Sigerson referred to True Blue as a "sturdy, dependable, lovable" album, praising Madonna's voice as sounding "better than ever".

While critiquing the album for lacking the "gleaming ultra-sleek aural surfaces" of Like a Virgin, Stephen Holden of The New York Times wrote that True Blue was made up of "shrewdly crafted teen-age and pre-teen-age ditties that reveal Madonna's unfailing commercial instincts" and found her singing with "a lot more heart". For the Minneapolis Star and Tribune, Jon Bream wrote that the album saw Madonna developing an independent artistic identity, rather than being primarily shaped by a contemporary producer; he praised the greater confidence in her singing and more mature lyrical themes. The Citizen's Mike Abrams stated that her vocals on the album were "better than ever" and deemed it a "showcase for her singing and writing", but wrote that much of the "glamor and starlet image" from her previous works was missing. Wayne Robbins—writing in Newsday—described True Blue as a record with "terrific tunes and no filler". He lauded Madonna for taking creative control as both a producer and songwriter, calling her a "formidable talent". For The Wall Street Journal, Pam Lambert commented on the "fresh-sounding, uncluttered production" of True Blue by Madonna, Bray, and Leonard, stating that "[the singer's] never sounded better".

Although True Blue was generally acclaimed, some reviewers were more mixed in their assessments. Although he praised the singles for being "strong enough to convince even her worst critics that Madonna does have talent", Observer–Reporter critic John Quayle dismissed the record as "warmed over Go-Gos material". Don McLeese of the Chicago Sun-Times stated that, although True Blue was a "valiant—and necessary—attempt on Madonna's part to expand her artistic range, [the album] just isn't as much fun" as her previous records. The Record-Journal's Jim Zebora applauded "Live to Tell" as "one absolutely marvelous torch song", but described the rest of True Blue as "barely competent post-disco". He concluded: "Let's call it a C plus and program the CD player to ignore eight out of [its] nine songs". Steve Morse of the Boston Globe and Ken Tucker from The Philadelphia Inquirer were also critical of the album; the former deemed it "tired" and "vapid", while the latter called it "boring" and "disappointing". Tucker, however, highlighted "Papa Don't Preach" as the only "terrific song" from the record.

=== Retrospective commentary ===
Retrospective professional reviews
Review scores
Source	Rating
AllMusic	4.5/5 stars
Blender	3/5 stars
Christgau's Record Guide	B
Entertainment Weekly	B
Slant Magazine	3.5/5 stars

In the years following its release, True Blue has continued to garner commentary from music critics. Piatkowski deemed it a "concerted effort to prove her mettle as an accomplished singer-songwriter" and a "self-conscious" attempt to "broaden her creative and artistic talents". Mary Von Aue of Stereogum stated that the album experiments with "different sounds that are well executed as singles", with "more vocal range and lyrical complexities" than Madonna's first two albums. However, she criticized True Blue as sounding "disjointed" and stated that the rest of the album "doesn't live up to the strength of [its singles]". Similarly, biographer Daryl Easlea said the album's five singles are "so strong" that they overshadow the album's other tracks, which may seem "slight by comparison".

AllMusic's Stephen Thomas Erlewine opined that True Blue was one of the great dance-pop albums. He acclaimed Madonna's skills as a songwriter, producer, provocateur, and entertainer, and highlighted the "wide reach, accomplishment, and sheer sense of fun" of the album. El Hunt of the Evening Standard described it as the "most polished" of Madonna's first three albums, striking a "flawless balance between the irresistible tang of sugary pop, and capturing a more diverse set of her artistic touchstones". For Spin, Al Shipley observed that tracks such as "Live to Tell" and "Papa Don't Preach" suggested Madonna's effort to move past her "boy toy" image and "be taken more seriously", although he described the album as "by far the least fun" of her 1980s releases. Robert Christgau, in his Record Guide book (1990), described True Blue as an "uneven product", arguing that its commercial success did not inherently constitute meaningful art. In his 2001 review for Entertainment Weekly, Jim Farber praised Madonna for "adding to her palette", lauding "La Isla Bonita" for its Spanish pop influences and describing "Live to Tell" as her best ballad to date.

== Commercial performance ==
In the United States, True Blue debuted on the Billboard 200 at number twenty-nine; it rose to number nine the following week. In its fifth week on the chart, the album reached number one. It was her second album to top the chart, following Like a Virgin, making Madonna one of five female artists in the rock era to reach number one with successive releases. True Blue remained atop the Billboard 200 for five consecutive weeks and spent eighty-two weeks on the chart. The album received a septuple platinum certification from the Recording Industry Association of America, denoting shipments of over seven million copies. After entering at number seventy-one, True Blue climbed to the top of the RPM albums chart in Canada five weeks later. It remained at number one for 11 consecutive weeks and eventually spent a total of 13 weeks atop the chart. The album was later certified diamond by the Canadian Recording Industry Association, denoting shipments of over one million copies. Madonna became the second female artist to receive the certification, following Whitney Houston.

True Blue topped the Argentine albums chart and eventually received a quadruple platinum certification from the Cámara Argentina de Productores de Fonogramas y Videogramas, denoting shipments of over 240,000 copies. In Brazil, it sold 205,000 copies within its first two weeks and reached number one on the albums chart. With total sales of 680,000 units by the end of the year, it ranked among the best-selling albums of 1987 and was certified gold by the Associação Brasileira dos Produtores de Discos. Having sold over one million copies overall, True Blue remains the best-selling album in Brazil by an international female artist. The album also topped Japan's Oricon chart and received the Japan Gold Disc Awards for Album of the Year Pop Solo and Grand Prix Album of the Year, the latter recognizing the best-selling international album of the year. In Hong Kong, True Blue topped the albums charts and received a platinum certification from the International Federation of the Phonographic Industry.

True Blue spent thirty-one weeks atop the European Top 100 Albums chart, making it the chart's longest-running number-one album, and had sold five million copies continent-wide by July 1987. It became the first album by an American artist to debut atop the UK Albums Chart, spending six weeks at number one. It was the best-selling album of 1986 in the UK, with sales of over two million copies. The British Phonographic Industry certified it septuple platinum and it has sold over two million copies. Topping the French albums chart, True Blue was certified diamond by the Syndicat National de l'Édition Phonographique for shipments of over one million units. In Germany, it reached number one on the albums chart and was certified double platinum by the Bundesverband Musikindustrie. Elsewhere in Europe, True Blue topped the charts in Belgium, Denmark, Finland, Iceland, Ireland, Italy, the Netherlands, Spain, Switzerland, and Sweden. (Note: Cited to multiple sources:)

True Blue reached the top of the albums chart in Australia and was certified quadruple platinum by the Australian Recording Industry Association, denoting shipments of over 280,000 copies. It also topped the chart in New Zealand and received a quintuple platinum certification from the Recording Industry Association of New Zealand for shipments of over 75,000 copies. The album reached number one in twenty-eight countries worldwide, setting a record at the time. The 1991 edition of the Guinness Book of World Records recognized True Blue as the best-selling album of all time by a female artist, with reported sales exceeding 17 million copies at the time. True Blue was the best-selling album of 1986 and became the best-selling album of the 1980s by a female artist. It remains one of the best-selling albums of all time, with sales exceeding 25 million copies worldwide. It is her best-selling studio album and second best-selling album overall, behind The Immaculate Collection (1990).

== Legacy ==
"True Blue launched Madonna to global superstardom, yes, but its impact on music and culture helped keep her at the top of her game for the next three decades, and it might well be the record she is remembered for many more decades to come".

— Classic Pop's Andy Jones commenting on the impact of True Blue

True Blue is credited with launching Madonna into worldwide superstardom. Erlewine deemed the album the point at which she became "Madonna the [s]uperstar", whom he described as "the endlessly ambitious, fearlessly provocative entertainer that knew how to outrage, spark debates, get good reviews—and make good music while she's at it". The BBC credited True Blue with broadening Madonna's appeal to an older audience while maintaining her younger fanbase. On the website for the Official Charts Company, Jack White wrote that the album "saw Madonna shoot into the realms of superstardom that her previous album Like a Virgin had cemented". Billboard's Paul Grein credited True Blue with helping popularize the marketing strategy of releasing multiple singles from an album, writing: "10 or 20 years ago you would have had two singles from an album at the most".

Reviewers have credited True Blue with cementing Madonna's status as one of the defining pop stars of the 1980s, ranking her alongside her leading male contemporaries. Author Robert C. Sickels wrote that True Blue solidified her status as the most popular female musician of the 1980s, "shining alongside" male pop icons such as Michael Jackson and Prince. Writing for Slant Magazine, Sal Cinquemani deemed True Blue the "supreme archetype for late '80s and early '90s pop music" and said that it marked Madonna's transition from "pop tart to consummate artist", rivaling the decade's other popular artists such as Jackson and Prince. Piatkowski said that True Blue was the album that made Madonna "the dominant face on the Mount Rushmore of 1980s pop", alongside Jackson, Prince, and Bruce Springsteen, while Mark Savage of the BBC wrote that it cemented her as the "first lady of pop". A writer for The Daily Telegraph included True Blue among what they described as the "four big beasts" of 1980s pop, alongside Thriller (1982) by Jackson, Purple Rain (1984) by Prince, and Faith (1987) by George Michael.

Multiple journalists have recognized the album for establishing Madonna's artistic credibility. Piatkowski stated that True Blue "set the stage for the exponential ascent of [her] brilliance" that began with Like a Prayer (1989) and peaked with Ray of Light (1998). Editors for Slant Magazine named the album one of the best of the 1980s; Jonathan Keefe wrote that it was where Madonna showed that she was more than "just a flash-in-the-pan pop star [...] [i]t's when she began manipulating her image—and her audience—with a real sense of clarity and purpose". According to Matthew Rettenmund, author of Encyclopedia Madonnica, True Blue provided the first "solid proof" of Madonna's artistic and musical abilities. Edna Gundersen, critic for USA Today, recognized the album for "boost[ing] her credibility with critics" and making her "an envelope-pushing provocateur and legitimate songwriter". O'Brien attributed the album's "sophisticated sheen" and its blending of 1960s girl group influences with "chunkier" dance textures to Madonna's transition from a dance-focused artist to a global pop figure.

== Track listing ==
True Blue track listing
No.	Title	Writer(s)	Producer(s)	Length
1.	"Papa Don't Preach"	Brian Elliot; Madonna^{[b]}	Madonna; Stephen Bray	4:29
2.	"Open Your Heart"	Madonna; Gardner Cole; Peter Rafelson	Madonna; Patrick Leonard	4:13
3.	"White Heat"	Madonna; Leonard	Madonna; Leonard	4:40
4.	"Live to Tell"	Madonna; Leonard	Madonna; Leonard	5:51
5.	"Where's the Party"	Madonna; Bray; Leonard	Madonna; Leonard; Bray	4:21
6.	"True Blue"	Madonna; Bray	Madonna; Bray	4:18
7.	"La Isla Bonita"	Madonna; Leonard; Bruce Gaitsch	Madonna; Leonard	4:02
8.	"Jimmy Jimmy"	Madonna; Bray	Madonna; Bray	3:55
9.	"Love Makes the World Go Round"	Madonna; Leonard	Madonna; Leonard	4:31
Total length:				40:20

2001 remastered edition bonus tracks
No.	Title	Remixer(s)	Length
10.	"True Blue" (The Color Mix)	Shep Pettibone	6:40
11.	"La Isla Bonita" (extended remix)	Chris Lord-Alge	5:27
Total length:			52:42

35th anniversary edition bonus tracks
No.	Title	Remixer(s)	Length
10.	"Papa Don't Preach" (extended remix)	Bray	5:42
11.	"True Blue" (The Color Mix)	Shep Pettibone	6:40
12.	"Open Your Heart" (extended version)	Michael Barbiero; Steve Thompson	10:34
13.	"La Isla Bonita" (extended remix)	Chris Lord-Alge	5:27
14.	"True Blue" (remix/edit)	Pettibone	4:26
15.	"Open Your Heart" (dub)	Barbiero; Thompson	6:40
16.	"Live to Tell" (instrumental)		5:50
17.	"True Blue" (instrumental)		6:51
18.	"La Isla Bonita" (instrumental extended remix)	Lord-Alge	5:18
Total length:			97:52

=== Notes ===
- ^{^[b]} signifies additional lyrics.

== Personnel ==
Credits are adapted from the album's liner notes.

- Madonna – producer, lead vocals, backing vocals (1, 2, 4–9)
- Stephen Bray – producer (1, 5, 6, 8), keyboards (1, 5, 6, 8), drums (1, 5, 6, 8), drum programming (3, 9)
- Fred Zarr – additional keyboards (1, 6, 8)
- Patrick Leonard – producer (2–5, 7, 9), keyboards (2–5, 7, 9), drum programming (3, 4, 7, 9), drums (5), additional keyboards (8)
- Bruce Gaitsch – electric guitar (1), guitars (3, 4, 7), rhythm guitar (6, 8)
- John Putnam – acoustic guitar (1), electric guitar (1)
- Russ Powell – guitar
- David Williams – rhythm guitar (1), guitars (2), backing vocals (3)
- Paul Jackson Jr. – guitars (3, 9)
- Dann Huff – guitars (5)
- Jonathan Moffett – percussion (1, 8), drums (2, 3, 4), backing vocals (3)
- Paulinho da Costa – percussion (2, 7, 9)
- David Boroff – saxophone (5)
- Billy Meyers – string arrangements (1)
- Siedah Garrett – backing vocals (1, 5, 6, 7, 9)
- Edie Lehmann – backing vocals (1, 5, 6, 7, 9)
- Keithen Carter – backing vocals (3)
- Jackie Jackson – backing vocals (3)
- Richard Marx – backing vocals (3)
- Michael Verdick – engineer, mixing
- Michael Hutchinson – keyboard overdub engineer (8)
- Dan Nebenzal – mix assistant
- Steve Hall – mastering
- Channel Recording Studios (Los Angeles, California) – recording location
- Master Control (Burbank, California) – mixing location
- Future Disc (Hollywood, California) – mastering location
- Jeffrey Kent Ayeroff – art direction
- Jeri McManus – art direction, design
- Herb Ritts – photography
- Weisner-DeMann Entertainment – management

== Charts ==
=== Weekly charts ===
1986–1987 weekly chart performance
Chart (1986–1987)	Peak position
Argentine Albums (Prensario/CAPIF)	1
Australian Albums (Kent Music Report)	1
Austrian Albums (Ö3 Austria)	2
Belgian Albums (IFPI/SIBESA)	1
Brazilian Albums (ABPD)	1
Canada Top Albums/CDs (RPM)	1
Canadian Albums (The Record)	1
Danish Albums (Music & Media)	1
Dutch Albums (Album Top 100)	1
European Top 100 Albums (Music & Media)	1
Finnish Albums (Suomen virallinen lista)	1
French Albums (SNEP)	1
German Albums (Offizielle Top 100)	1
Hong Kong Albums (IFPI)	1
Icelandic Albums (Tónlist)	1
Irish Albums (IFPI)	1
Israeli albums (IFPI)	1
Italian Albums (Musica e dischi)	1
Japanese Albums (Oricon)	1
New Zealand Albums (RMNZ)	1
Norwegian Albums (VG-lista)	2
Philippine Albums (PARI)	1
Spanish Albums (PROMUSICAE)	1
Swedish Albums (Sverigetopplistan)	2
Swiss Albums (Schweizer Hitparade)	1
UK Albums (Official Charts)	1
UK Disco Albums (Music Week)	1
US Billboard 200	1
US Top R&B/Hip-Hop Albums (Billboard)	47
US Top 100 Pop Albums (Cash Box)	1
Venezuelan Albums (IFPI)	1

1995–2026 weekly chart performance
Chart (1995–2026)	Peak position
Croatian International Albums (HDU)	1
Greek Albums (Billboard)	5
Hungarian Physical Albums (MAHASZ)	23
Italian Albums (FIMI)	82
Japanese Top Albums Sales (Billboard Japan)	79
Scottish Albums (Official Charts)	27

=== Monthly charts ===
Monthly chart performance
Chart (2020)	Peak position
Croatian International Vinyl Albums (HDU)	6

=== Year-end charts ===
1986 year-end chart performance
Chart (1986)	Position
Australian Albums (Kent Music Report)	10
Austrian Albums (Ö3 Austria)	10
Brazilian Albums (ABPD)	8
Canada Top Albums/CDs (RPM)	2
Dutch Albums (Album Top 100)	1
European Top 100 Albums (Music & Media)	1
French Albums (SNEP)	1
German Albums (Offizielle Top 100)	6
Italian Albums (Musica e dischi)	1
Japanese Albums (Oricon)	13
New Zealand Albums (RMNZ)	6
Norwegian Summer Period (VG-lista)	3
Spanish Albums (PROMUSICAE)	9
Swiss Albums (Schweizer Hitparade)	5
UK Albums (OCC)	1
US Billboard 200	37
US Cash Box Top 100 Albums	7

1987 year-end chart performance
Chart (1987)	Position
Australian Albums (Kent Music Report)	21
Austrian Albums (Ö3 Austria)	16
Canada Top Albums/CDs (RPM)	6
Dutch Albums (Album Top 100)	10
European Top 100 Albums (Music & Media)	3
German Albums (Offizielle Top 100)	7
Japanese Albums (Oricon)	40
New Zealand Albums (RMNZ)	39
Spanish Albums (PROMUSICAE)	12
US Billboard 200	11

=== Decade-end charts ===
1980–1989 decade-end chart performance
Chart (1980–1989)	Position
Australian Albums (Kent Music Report)	36
Japanese Albums (Oricon)	36
UK Albums (OCC)	10

=== All-time charts ===
All-time chart performance
Chart	Position
US Billboard 200	179
US Billboard 200 (Women)	48

== Certifications and sales ==
List of certifications and sales
Region	Certification	Certified units/sales
Argentina (CAPIF)	4× Platinum	350,000
Australia (ARIA)	4× Platinum	280,000^{^}
Austria (IFPI Austria)	Platinum	50,000^{*}
Belgium (BRMA)	Platinum	75,000
Brazil (Pro-Música Brasil)	Gold	1,000,000
Canada (Music Canada)	Diamond	1,000,000^{^}
Denmark (IFPI Danmark)	Platinum	20,000^{‡}
Finland (Musiikkituottajat)	Platinum	53,912
France (SNEP)	Diamond	1,300,000
Germany (BVMI)	2× Platinum	1,000,000^{^}
Greece (IFPI Greece)	Gold	50,000^{^}
Hong Kong (IFPI Hong Kong)	Platinum	20,000^{*}
Ireland (IRMA)	Gold	
Israel	—	62,000
Italy (AFI)	4× Platinum	1,500,000
Italy (FIMI) sales since 2009	Gold	25,000^{‡}
Japan (RIAJ)	Gold	718,000
Malaysia	—	22,000
Netherlands (NVPI)	Platinum	100,000^{^}
New Zealand (RMNZ)	5× Platinum	75,000^{^}
Norway (IFPI Norway)	Platinum	110,000
Philippines (PARI)	Gold	
Portugal (AFP)	Gold	20,000^{^}
Singapore	—	25,000 (Note: First-day sales for True Blue in Singapore)
Spain (Promusicae)	3× Platinum	300,000^{^}
Sweden (GLF)	Gold	
Switzerland (IFPI Switzerland)	3× Platinum	150,000^{^}
Turkey	—	100,000
United Kingdom (BPI)	7× Platinum	2,100,000^{^}
United States (RIAA)	7× Platinum	7,000,000^{^}
Summaries
Europe as of July 1987	—	5,500,000
Worldwide	—	25,000,000
^{*} Sales figures based on certification alone.^{^} Shipments figures based on certification alone.^{‡} Sales+streaming figures based on certification alone.

== See also ==
- List of best-selling albums
- List of best-selling albums by women
- List of Diamond-certified albums in Canada
- List of European number-one hits of 1986
- List of Billboard 200 number-one albums of 1986

== Bibliography ==
- Andersen, Christopher (1992). Madonna: Unauthorized. Simon & Schuster. ISBN 0-671-73532-2.
- Bego, Mark (2000). Madonna: Blonde Ambition. Cooper Square Press. ISBN 978-0-8154-1051-5.
- Bohem, David A. (1990). Guinness Book of World Records 1990. Sterling Publications. ISBN 0-8069-5791-3.
- Butler, Jeremy G. (2002). Television: Critical Methods and Applications. Lawrence Erlbaum Associates. ISBN 0-8058-4209-8.
- Clerk, Carol (2002). Madonnastyle. Music Sales Group. ISBN 0-7119-8874-9.
- Cross, Mary (2007). Madonna: A Biography. Greenwood Publishing Group. ISBN 978-0-313-33811-3.
- Easlea, Daryl (2012). Madonna: Blond Ambition. Backbeat Books. ISBN 978-1-61713-034-2.
- Forbes, Bruce David; Mahan, Jeffrey H. (2005). Religion and Popular Culture in America. University of California Press. ISBN 0-520-24689-6.
- Fouz-Hernández, Santiago; Jarman-Ivens, Freeya (2004). Madonna's Drowned Worlds. Ashgate Publishing, Ltd. ISBN 0-7546-3372-1.
- Guilbert, Georges-Claude (2002). Madonna as Postmodern Myth. McFarland. ISBN 0-7864-1408-1.
- McKeen, William (2000). Rock and Roll Is Here to Stay. W. W. Norton & Company. ISBN 0-393-04700-8.
- Matthew-Walker, Robert (1991). Madonna: The Biography. Pan Books. ISBN 0-330-31482-3.
- Marsh, Dave (1999). The Heart of Rock & Soul: The 1001 Greatest Singles Ever Made. Da Capo Press. ISBN 0-306-80901-X.
- Metz, Allen; Benson, Carol (1999). The Madonna Companion: Two Decades of Commentary. Music Sales Group. ISBN 978-0-8256-7194-4.
- Morton, Andrew (2001). Madonna. Michael O'Mara Books. ISBN 978-1-85479-888-6.
- Mitchell, Jolyon P. (2000). Visually Speaking: Radio and the Renaissance of Preaching. Westminster – John Knox Press. ISBN 0-664-22244-7.
- O'Brien, Lucy (2008). Madonna: Like an Icon. Bantam Press. ISBN 978-0-593-05547-2.
- Perone, James E. (2018). Listen to Pop!. Bloomsbury Publishing. ISBN 978-1-4408-6377-6.
- Rettenmund, Matthew (1995). Encyclopedia Madonnica. St. Martin's Press. ISBN 0-312-11782-5.
- Rooksby, Rikky (2004). The Complete Guide to the Music of Madonna. Omnibus Press. ISBN 0-7119-9883-3.
- Sickels, Robert C. (2013). 100 Entertainers Who Changed America: An Encyclopedia of Pop Culture Luminaries. ABC-CLIO. ISBN 978-1-59884-831-1.
- Taraborrelli, Randy J. (2002). Madonna: An Intimate Biography. Simon & Schuster. ISBN 0-7432-2880-4.
- Voller, Debbie (1999). Madonna: The Style Book. Omnibus Press. ISBN 978-0-7119-7511-8.
