= True Blue (Madonna song) =

Single by Madonna

from the album True Blue
- B-side: "Ain't No Big Deal"
- Released: September 17, 1986
- Studio: Channel Recording (Los Angeles, CA)
- Genre: Dance-pop; bubblegum pop
- Length: 4:19
- Label: Sire; Warner Bros.
- Songwriters: Madonna; Stephen Bray
- Producers: Madonna; Stephen Bray

Madonna singles chronology
"Papa Don't Preach" (1986)	"True Blue" (1986)	"Open Your Heart" (1987)

Music video
- "True Blue" on YouTube

"True Blue" is a song by American singer Madonna from her third studio album of the same name (1986). Written and produced by the singer and her collaborator Stephen Bray, it was released to radio on September 13, 1986. In Australia, New Zealand, and most European countries, it was released as the album's third single in the USA on September 17th 1986. Physically released as a single in the United States on October 9. A dance-pop song that takes influence from Motown and girl groups from the 1950s and 1960s, "True Blue" addresses Madonna's feelings for her then-husband Sean Penn.

Critical reception towards "True Blue" was generally positive, with praise being given to its retro, girl group influence. It topped the charts in Canada, the United Kingdom and Ireland. In the United States, it reached the third position of the Billboard Hot 100 and was the singer's tenth consecutive top-ten hit.

Two music videos were shot for the song. James Foley directed the official one that aired internationally, which shows Madonna in a 1950s-inspired blue setting, joined by backup singers. In the US, Sire Records teamed up with MTV for a competition called "Madonna's 'Make My Video' Contest". Fans were called on to make their own video and submit them for the singer's approval. The winning clip was shot in sepia and depicted a teenage romance. "True Blue" was included on Madonna's Who's That Girl (1987) and Rebel Heart (2015―2016) concert tours, and has been covered by a handful of artists, including Darren Hayes.

== Background ==
In early 1985, Madonna began dating actor Sean Penn, whom she met in the set of the music video for her single "Material Girl". They dated casually and married six months later, on her 27th birthday. She also met producer Patrick Leonard while on the Virgin Tour, where he was hired as musical director. Madonna's third studio album, True Blue, was announced in April 1986. It takes its title after a favorite expression of Penn's, which signifies a "very pure vision of love". For the project, she kept Leonard and also enlisted former boyfriend Stephen Bray, with whom she had worked on Like a Virgin (1984), her previous album.

Composed alongside Bray, the title track was described as Madonna's "unabashed valentine" for Penn, and influenced by the "direct antecedents" of her sound: Motown, girl groups from the 1960s such as the Shirelles, and songs like "Chapel of Love" (1964) by the Dixie Cups. Bray recalled that Madonna was "very much in love" when creating the track; "if she's in love she'll write love songs. If she's not in love she definitely won't be writing love songs". While looking back in 2015, the singer revealed that she "didn't know what I was talking about when I wrote [that song]".

== Composition and release ==
"True Blue"
27-second audio sample from "True Blue". Rikky Rooksby wrote in The Complete Guide to the Music of Madonna that the song follows the "king of all doo-wop chord sequences": I–vi–IV–V.

"True Blue" and its parent album were recorded at Los Angeles' Channel Recording studios. Personnel working on the song included Bray on drums and keyboard arrangement, alongside Fred Zarr; Bruce Gaitsch played guitar while background vocals were provided by Siedah Garrett and Edie Lehmann. "True Blue" has been noted a "sweetly bubblegummy mix of '60s girl group sounds and '80s dance pop". In its lyrics, Madonna expresses her love and devotion for Penn. According to the sheet music published by Alfred Publishing Inc., it is set in the time signature of 12/8, with a moderate tempo of 120 beats per minute. The song is composed in the key of B major, and has a basic sequence of I–vi–IV–V (B–G♯m–E–F♯) as its main chord progression. Madonna's vocal range spans a bit less than one and a half octaves, going from F♯_{3} to B_{4}.

The "verse-and-chorus" composition is similar to that of "Chapel of Love", with Garrett and Lehman accompanying the singer's convincing "girly" vocals like a choir. It begins with a "pert call to attention", which then goes from "coy rejoinder" to "bossy command". Madonna sings, I’ve had other guys/I've looked into their eyes/But I never knew love before/'Til you walked through my door. In the "cooing" refrain, she sings in Betty Boop-like vocals, True love/You're the one I'm dreaming of/Your heart fits me like a glove/And I'm gonna be true blue/Baby, I love you. The bridge plays twice, and has Madonna singing the line No-oh more sadness/I kiss it goodbye.

"True Blue" began receiving airplay on American radio the week of September 13, 1986, when it was yet to be released as a single. In Australia, New Zealand, and most European countries, it was released as the album's third single on September 29. (Note: See sources cited on "Weekly charts" section) In the United States, a release was issued on October 9. "True Blue" has not been included in any of Madonna's major compilations, but was part of The Holiday Collection ―a four track EP released exclusively in the United Kingdom in August 1991.

== Critical reception ==
"An ebullient ode to then-boo Sean Penn, ['True Blue'] melds doo-wop harmonies with a quaint '80s beat. By all reasonable measures, it should be disposable pop fluff; but in Madonna's hands, it's an impossibly charming slice of puppy love — albeit a naive one".

— Billboard's Joe Lynch reviewing "True Blue" on the magazine's list of Madonna's 100 best songs.

Critical feedback towards "True Blue" has been generally positive. J. Randy Taraborrelli, author of Madonna: An Intimate Biography, deemed it a light-hearted, fun track. In the book Rock 'n' Roll Gold Rush, Maury Dean referred to "True Blue" as a "masterwork of simplicity interwoven with secret complexity [...] on one hand, it's just a basic Streetcorner ditty, with four basic chords. In another context, it's a counterpoint harmonic blanket, twirling with star-spangled timbre and dynamic drive". Matthew Rettenmund, author of Encyclopedia Madonnica, hailed it a "sweet tune" that features the singer "at her chirpiest and most flirtatious", and "best illustrates [the album]'s ―and Madonna's― dedication to Penn". AllMusic's Stewart Mason opined the singer's vocals resembled Cyndi Lauper's, albeit "with a slightly less kitschy attitude". From website This is Dig! Mark Elliott referred to "True Blue" as the most "representative" of the parent album's nine songs, and an "irresistibly catchy homage" to the 1950s and 60s.

For Erika Wexler from Spin, it is a "cute retro throwaway" that "exude[s] innocence and harmony. Love is as simple as the lyrics". In this vein, Slant Magazine's Sal Cinquemani said "True Blue" was an "authentic throwback to the girl-group-era pop". For the Chicago Tribune, Jan DeKnock also praised its girl group influence, and described the song as a "charming [...] perfect end-of-summer confection that will do equally well with pop and adult contemporary listeners". James Croot from New Zealand website Stuff said it was the "crowning glory" of the parent album; "[a] toe-tapping 1950s-inspired ditty [...] pop-song confection perfection. Filled with hooks and eminently sing-a-longable, it can still brighten the mood of even the most trying day". For Los Angeles Times' Robert Hilburn, "['True Blue'] mixes the innocence of '50s R&B, with the punch of Spector's '60s classics for a contemporary blend of 'In the Still of the Night' and 'Be My Baby'". It was noted a "cross between 'Heaven Must Have Sent You' and 'Chapel of Love'" by Rolling Stone's Davitt Sigerson, while John Quayle from the Observer–Reporter said it was a "sickenly sweet throwaway".

In more critical reviews, Matthew Jacobs from HuffPost wrote that, "taken as anything other than homage, ['True Blue']'s a silly, meandering tune. But heard as a could-be outtake from the Grease soundtrack, it's a song that's still worthy of singing into your hairbrush in the bathroom mirror". While Gavin Scott, from Australian website Chart Beats, said it was the "cheesiest" single of Madonna's career after "Hanky Panky" (1990), Albumism's Justin Chadwick deemed it one of the parent album's "campy, borderline contrived moments". Even though he named it "dated and simplistic", Terry Hearn from The Metropolist concluded that, "hearing this [song] from the woman who was singing 'Like a Virgin' could be disorienting, but what a feat it is to shock people by being so simple and pure. It represents a clever inversion of what is expected from pop music stars". Rikky Rooksby deemed it a "merely cute [...] saccharine uptempo update" of Like a Virgin album track "Shoo-Bee-Doo", but felt it did not live up to being the album's title track. A writer for The Wichita Eagle was not impressed with "True Blue", believing that it came off as "sassless and neutered" when compared to the other songs on the album. Nathan Smith from the Houston Press dismissed "True Blue" as "embarrassingly cute and entirely forgettable. [...] [it] sounds influenced more by the retro cheese of Grease than any genuine human feeling".

"True Blue" is Madonna's 47th best single according to Entertainment Weekly's Chuck Arnold, who applauded its "bouncy charm". On The Guardian's ranking, it came in at number 40; Jude Rogers deemed it a "well-tailored, retro-positioned pop [song] that's aged remarkably well". It was named the singer's 33rd best single by both the staff of Rolling Stone, and Melissa Ruggieri from USA Today. The former said that it "found Madonna sounding blissfully smitten", while according to the latter, "[it] might be the most innocent [she] has ever sounded".

== Chart performance ==
"True Blue" debuted on the US Billboard Hot 100 at number 40 the week of October 4, 1986. It was one of the year's highest-debuting singles, alongside "Say You, Say Me" and "Dancing on the Ceiling" by Lionel Richie. Almost one month later, it became Madonna's tenth consecutive top-ten single, which tied her with Brenda Lee as the second female in the rock era to score this amount of consecutive top-tens. "True Blue" reached the chart's third spot on November 15, and remained on that position for three consecutive weeks, and a total of 16 weeks on the chart overall. The song performed well on other Billboard charts, reaching the fifth and sixth spots of the Adult Contemporary and Hot Dance Club Songs charts, respectively. "True Blue" ranked 76th on the Billboard's year-end Hot 100 chart. In October 1998, the single was certified gold by the Recording Industry Association of America (RIAA) for shipment of 500,000 copies. In Canada, "True Blue" debuted at number 84 on the RPM Top Singles chart for the week of September 27, 1986; two months later, it reached the chart's first spot, becoming Madonna's fifth number-one single in the nation and her third consecutive number one from the True Blue album, following "Live to Tell" and "Papa Don't Preach".

In the United Kingdom, "True Blue" debuted at the third position of the singles chart on October 4, 1986. One week later, it reached the top spot and became Madonna's third number one in the country. "True Blue" was certified gold by the British Phonographic Industry (BPI) on October 10, 1986, and has sold over 557,000 copies as of March 2015. The single also saw success in Ireland, where it was Madonna's fourth number one hit. In Australia, the song reached the chart's top-five and was given a platinum certification by the Australian Recording Industry Association (ARIA) for the shipment of 70,000 copies. Similarly, in New Zealand, "True Blue" peaked within the chart's first three spots. The single was successful across Europe, reaching the top-five of most countries, and coming at number one on the European Hot 100 Singles chart. It had a moderate reception in Sweden, where it barely cracked the top 20.

== Music videos ==
=== Official ===
The "True Blue" video shows Madonna driving a Thunderbird convertible with her girlfriends in the back.

The official music video for "True Blue" was directed by James Foley, with whom Madonna had worked on "Live to Tell" and "Papa Don't Preach", and aired outside of the United States. Crew included Robert Colesberry and David Massar in production, while Michael Ballhaus was in charge of cinematography. For the visual, Madonna adopted a new leaner look; she hired a personal trainer to assist her in a "relentless exercise program". The video shows her on an all-blue set, which includes a 1950s-style diner and a white Thunderbird convertible. She dons a Marlene Stewart-created ensemble consisting of black ankle-length tights and blue poodle skirt. Stylist Victor Vídal came up with the Elvis Presley-like hairdo the singer wears on the video; "I told her about this vision I had of her. I wanted to bleach her hair almost white and cut it short. She thought for a moment, said yes, picked up a magazine and never looked up until I was finished", Vídal recalled. Actress Debi Mazar and dancer Erika Belle appear as the singer's girlfriends. In one scene, Madonna sits on the Thunderbird and "campily" pretends to drive it, while Mazar and Belle dance behind her.

In the UK, "True Blue" premiered on October 2, 1986, on television program Top of the Pops. Nine days later, it aired on the rest of Europe. Upon release, the staff of British magazine Record Mirror compared the video's aesthetic to that of American television series Happy Days, and said it was as "cute as a choc bar commercial". Mark Elliott noted that, following the controversy "Papa Don't Preach" and its video had caused, "True Blue" was "nothing [that would] worry the parents, which was probably something of a relief to record company executives". Matthew Rettenmund gave a mixed review of the visual; he deemed it cute but pointed out the singer looked "bothered at having to do it". It is one of Madonna's most underrated music videos according to VH1's Christopher Rosa. Louis Virtel from The Backlot ranked it as the singer's 46th greatest video. By contrast, Vulture's Justin Ravitz named it one of her five worst. "True Blue" can be found on Madonna's 2009 video compilation Celebration: The Video Collection.

=== MTV's "Make My Video" contest ===
In the US, Sire Records teamed up with MTV for a competition called "Madonna's 'Make My Video' Contest". Fans were called on to make and submit their own video for "True Blue, and the winner would be awarded a trip to MTV's New York studios, and granted a check for $25,000 by Madonna herself. Over 3,000 entries were sent, ranging from "semi-professional film-school projects to amusingly amateurish camcorder clips", as noted by Yahoo!'s Lyndsay Parker. In Gender Politics and MTV: Voicing the Difference, author Lisa A. Lewis wrote that although many featured Madonna wannabes and a wide range of concepts, they all focused on the song's theme of true love. There were some, however, that dealt with other themes such as power: One had schoolgirls owerpowering and tying up a teacher who spoke ill of Madonna; in another, an American girl and a Russian boy grow up to become president of the United States and of the USSR, respectively. MTV dedicated an entire day to air the entries ―October 30, 1986, nicknamed "Blue Thursday". The three finalists all incorporated a "nostalgic" 1950s-style production design in a nod to the song and its themes.

The contest was won by Venezuela-born, Miami-based college student Angel Gracia, and fellow filmmaker Cliff Guest. They allegedly spent under $1,000 to make their video, which told the sepia-toned story of a teenage romance. Gracia recalled that at the time, he wasn't a fan of the singer's and thus "felt bad" for winning. Aired as the official "True Blue" video in the United States, Gracia and Guest's entry spent weeks in high rotation on the network's Dial MTV countdown program. Additionally, they signed a one-year contract as in-house video directors for Geffen Records. Lewis went on to say that the contest emphasized the effect Madonna had on different kind of audiences due to its popularity.

== Live performances and covers ==
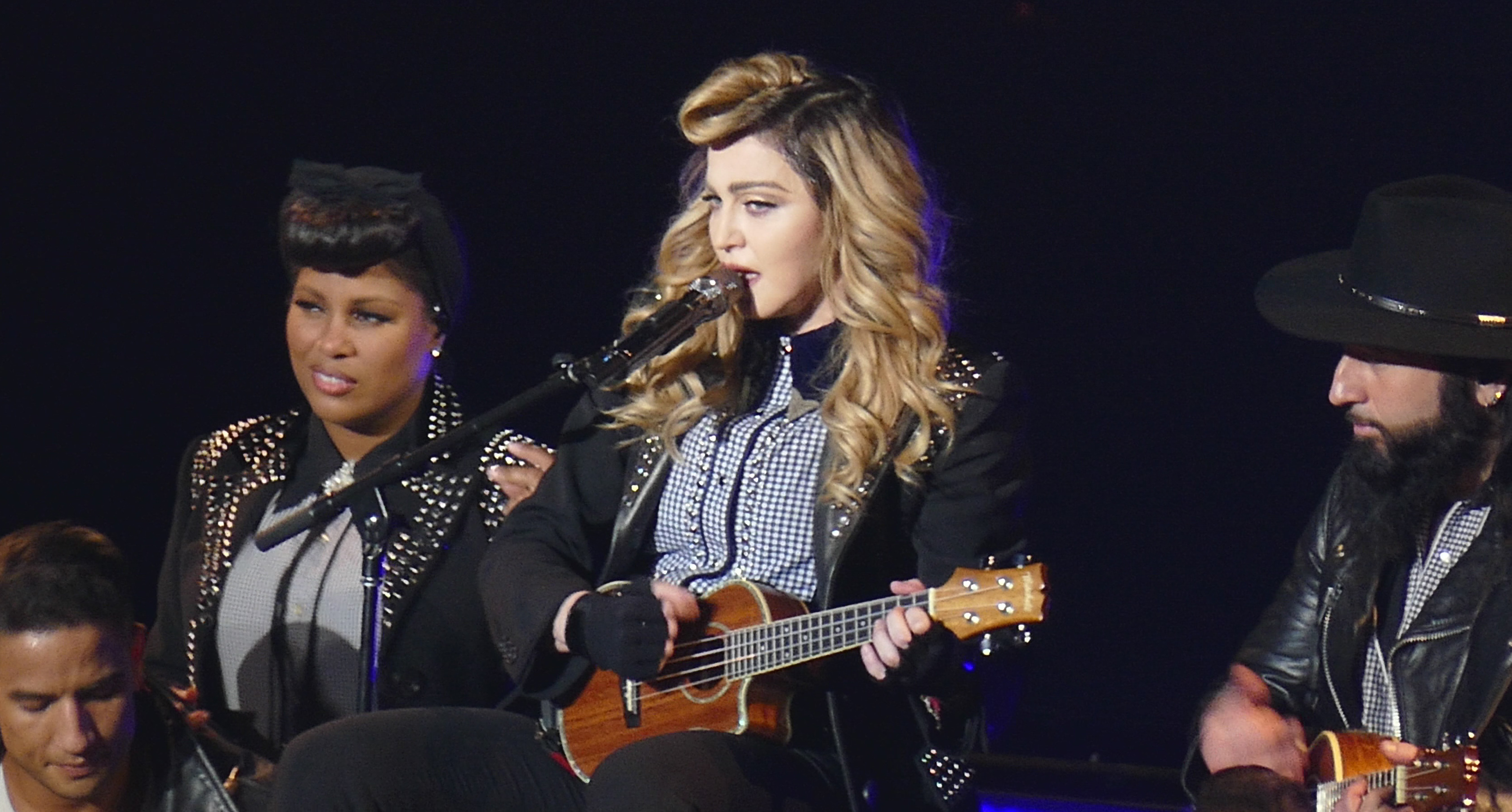
Madonna singing an acoustic version of "True Blue" with the ukulele on 2015―2016's Rebel Heart Tour

"True Blue" has been featured on two of Madonna's concert tours: Who's That Girl (1987) and Rebel Heart (2015―2016). On the first one, it was sung with Madonna decked out in a blue 1950s dress. She was joined by her backup singers and, towards the end, was asked to dance by a male dancer. Jeffrey Hornaday, known for his work on Flashdance (1983), choreographed the number. Robert Hilburn highlighted the innocence displayed by Madonna on the performance. Two different performances can be found on the videos Who's That Girl: Live in Japan, filmed in Tokyo, Japan, on June 22, and Ciao Italia: Live from Italy, filmed in Turin, Italy, on September 4.

On the Rebel Heart Tour, the song was re-worked in an acoustic doo-wop style, with Madonna playing the ukelele from atop a tire stack. The stage resembled a gas station, while the backdrop screen displayed a crescent moon. To Michael Lallo from The Sydney Morning Herald, it was, "perhaps the most joyous moment of the evening". The performance of the song at the March 19–20, 2016 shows in Sydney's Allphones Arena was recorded and released on the artist's fifth live album, Rebel Heart Tour (2017).

A handful of artists have recorded covers of "True Blue". In 1994, the Gary Tesca Orchestra covered the song for Greatest Hits from the Superstars! (Who's That Girl). Four years later, a rendition by the Royal Philharmonic Orchestra was included on Material Girl: RPO Plays Music of Madonna. The Starsound Orchestra recorded "True Blue" for the 2001 album Plays the Hits Made Famous by Madonna. In 2011, Independent record label Paper Bag Records released a track-by-track cover of True Blue, where the title track was performed by Canadian indie rock band Winter Gloves, and singer Hannah Georgas. This rendition was critically appreciated, with Stereogum's Scott Lapatine placing it at number 16 of his ranking of "The 20 Best Indie Rock Madonna Covers". Australian singers James Blundell and Tania Kernaghan recorded "True Blue" for the former's twelfth studio album Campfire (2017). Finally, in 2023, Australian singer Darren Hayes did a mashup of "True Blue" and Savage Garden's "I Knew I Loved You" (1999) on his Do You Remember? Tour.

== Track listings and formats ==
- European 7" single
1. "True Blue" (Remix/Edit) – 4:22
2. "Holiday" (7" Edit) – 3:50
- US 7" single
1. "True Blue" – 4:16
2. "Ain't No Big Deal" – 4:12
- Japan 7" single
1. "True Blue" (Radio Edit) – 4:09
2. "Ain't No Big Deal" – 4:12
- UK 12" single
1. "True Blue" (Extended Dance Version) – 6:37
2. "Holiday" – 6:08
- US 12" Maxi-single
1. "True Blue" (The Color Mix) – 6:37
2. "True Blue" (Instrumental) – 6:56
3. "Ain't No Big Deal" – 4:12
4. "True Blue (Remix/Edit) – 4:22
- The Holiday Collection - EP (1991)
1. "Holiday" – 6:09
2. "True Blue" – 4:17
3. "Who's That Girl" (LP version) – 3:58
4. "Causing a Commotion" (Silver Screen single mix) – 4:06
- CD Super Club Mix (1992)
1. "True Blue" (The Color Mix) – 6:37
2. "Everybody" (Dub Version) – 9:23
3. "Papa Don't Preach" (Extended Remix) – 5:45
4. "Everybody" (Extended Version) – 5:56
5. "Live to Tell" (Instrumental) – 5:49
- Digital EP (2024)
1. "True Blue" (Remix/Edit) – 4:22
2. "True Blue" (The Color Mix) – 6:37
3. "True Blue" (Instrumental) – 6:56
4. "Ain't No Big Deal" – 4:12

== Credits and personnel ==
Credits and personnel are adapted from the True Blue album liner notes.

- Madonna – lyrics, producer, vocals
- Stephen Bray – drums, keyboard, lyrics, producer
- Siedah Garrett – background vocals
- Edie Lehmann – background vocals
- Bruce Gaitsch – rhythm guitar
- Fred Zarr – additional keyboard
- Steve Peck – engineer
- Shep Pettibone – remixing
- Herb Ritts – photography
- Jeri McManus – design/artwork

== Charts ==
=== Weekly charts ===
Weekly chart performance for "True Blue"
Chart (1986–1987)	Peak position
Australia (Kent Music Report)	5
Austria (Ö3 Austria Top 40)	9
Belgium (Ultratop 50 Flanders)	2
Brazil (ABPD)	4
Canada (The Record)	2
Canada Top Singles (RPM)	1
Denmark (Hitlisten)	1
European Hot 100 Singles (Music & Media)	1
European Airplay Top 50 (Music & Media)	1
Finland (Suomen virallinen lista)	12
France (SNEP)	6
Germany (GfK)	6
Iceland (RÚV)	4
Ireland (IRMA)	1
Italy (Musica e dischi)	3
Netherlands (Dutch Top 40)	4
Netherlands (Single Top 100)	4
New Zealand (Recorded Music NZ)	3
Spain (AFYVE)	12
Sweden (Sverigetopplistan)	18
Switzerland (Schweizer Hitparade)	6
South Africa (Radio Orion)	3
UK Singles (Official Charts)	1
US Billboard Hot 100	3
US Adult Contemporary (Billboard)	5
US Dance Club Songs (Billboard)	6
US Dance Singles Sales (Billboard)	4
US Cash Box Top 100	3

=== Year-end charts ===
1986 year-end chart performance for "True Blue"
Chart (1986)	Position
Australia (Kent Music Report)	45
Belgium (Ultratop 50 Flanders)	29
Brazil (Brazil Top 10)	2
Canada Top Singles (RPM)	31
European Hot 100 Singles (Music & Media)	33
France (SNEP)	34
Netherlands (Dutch Top 40)	43
Netherlands (Single Top 100)	19
New Zealand (Recorded Music NZ)	39
UK Singles (OCC)	11
US Billboard Hot 100	76
US Cash Box Top 100	45

== Certifications and sales ==
Region	Certification	Certified units/sales
Australia (ARIA)	Platinum	70,000^{^}
France (SNEP)	Silver	300,000
Japan (Oricon Charts)	—	5,170
United Kingdom (BPI)	Silver	557,000
United States (RIAA)	Gold	500,000^{^}
^{^} Shipments figures based on certification alone.

== See also ==
- List of number-one singles of 1986 (Canada)
- List of European number-one hits of 1986
- List of number-one singles of 1986 (Ireland)
- List of UK Singles Chart number ones of the 1980s

== Bibliography ==
- Bego, Mark (2000). Madonna: Blonde Ambition. Cooper Square Press. ISBN 978-0-8154-1051-5.
- Clerk, Carol (2002). Madonnastyle. Omnibus Press. ISBN 0-7119-8874-9.
- Dean, Maury (2003). Rock 'n' Roll Gold Rush: A Singles Un-Cyclopedia. Algora Publishing. ISBN 0-87586-207-1.
- Gabriel, Mary (2023). Madonna: A Rebel Life. Hachette UK. ISBN 978-0316456449.
- Lewis, Lisa A. (1991). Gender Politics and MTV: Voicing the Difference. Temple University Press. ISBN 0-87722-942-2.
- McKeen, William (2000). Rock and roll is here to stay. W. W. Norton & Company. ISBN 0-393-04700-8.
- Morton, Andrew (2002). Madonna. St. Martin's Press. ISBN 0-312-28786-0.
- O'Brien, Lucy (2008). Madonna: Like an Icon. Bantam Press. ISBN 978-0-593-05547-2.
- Parish, James Robert; Pitts, Michael R. (2003). Hollywood Songsters: Garland to O'Connor. Taylor & Francis. ISBN 0-415-94333-7.
- Rettenmund, Matthew (1995). Encyclopedia Madonnica. St. Martin's Press. ISBN 0-312-11782-5.
- Rooksby, Rikky (2004). The Complete Guide to the Music of Madonna. Omnibus Press. ISBN 0-7119-9883-3.
- Sexton, Adam (1993). Desperately Seeking Madonna: In Search of the Meaning of the World's Most Famous Woman. Random Penguin. ISBN 0-307-48374-6.
- St. Michael, Mick (2004). Madonna 'talking': Madonna in Her Own Words. Omnibus Press. ISBN 1-84449-418-7.
- Taraborrelli, Randy J. (2002). Madonna: An Intimate Biography. Simon & Schuster. ISBN 0-7432-2880-4.
- Voller, Debbi (1999). Madonna: The Style Book. Omnibus Press. ISBN 0-7119-7511-6.
