= Spotlight (Madonna song) =

1988 single by Madonna

Single by Madonna

from the album You Can Dance
- B-side: "Where's the Party"
- Released: April 25, 1988
- Genre: Dance-pop, synth-pop
- Length: 6:23
- Label: Sire; Warner Bros.
- Songwriters: Madonna; Stephen Bray; Curtis Hudson
- Producer: Stephen Bray

Madonna singles chronology
| "The Look of Love" (1987) | "Spotlight" (1988) | "Like a Prayer" (1989) |

Licensed audio
- "Spotlight" on YouTube

"Spotlight" is a song by American singer Madonna from her first remix album You Can Dance (1987). It was released as a single in Japan on April 25, 1988 by Sire Records and Warner-Pioneer Japan. Initially rejected during her True Blue album recording sessions, the song was written by Madonna, Stephen Bray and Curtis Hudson who had presented the original to the singer. The song was remixed by John "Jellybean" Benitez.

"Spotlight" features instrumentation from drums, bass synths and handclaps, accompanied by vocal echos, a piano segment and violin phrases in the musical interlude. The lyrics talk about how one can be famous if one sings about it. The song received mixed reviews from critics. After its release, it reached number 68 on the Japanese Oricon weekly singles chart, as well as number three on its international singles chart. Although not released commercially in the United States, the song managed to chart on Billboard's Airplay chart peaking at #32 in early 1988. The song was used in a Mitsubishi VCR commercial, in which she appeared.

== Background ==
In 1983, Curtis Hudson and Lisa Stevens of the group Pure Energy had written the song "Holiday", which Madonna recorded and released as the third single from her self-titled debut album. After the single's commercial success, Hudson wrote a song sounding like "Holiday", in case Warner Bros., Madonna's record company, wanted to release a similar sounding single. He named it "Spotlight" and offered it to Madonna, who recorded the song for her 1986 album True Blue but it was ultimately not included on the album.

== Composition ==
"Spotlight"
A 20 second sample of "Spotlight", featuring the chorus with Madonna singing the line "Spotlight, open up your eyes and see".

"Spotlight was originally produced by Stephen Bray and was remixed by John "Jellybean" Benitez for the You Can Dance compilation. Curtis Hudson, who was given credit as a songwriter since he had the demo copyrighted, recalled that much of the demo's production was changed in the final version, including the rhythm and the basic groove.

"Spotlight" begins with the sound of drums, bass synths and handclaps, followed by Madonna uttering the words "Spotlight, shine bright". After the first verse, the sound of keyboard is heard during the effect. It continues like this through the second verse, which is followed by an interlude featuring vocal echos, a piano segment and violin phrases. Madonna follows the music played by the piano and utters the words "Pa-da-pa-da-pappa pappa pa pa" in the same melody. The lyrics deal with Madonna making the listener remember that "Everybody is a Star" and that if one wants to be famous and be under the "Spotlight", the person should sing about it and reality may catch up with him or her. According to the sheet music for the song, it is set in the time signature of common time, with a tempo of 100 beats per minute. It is set in the key of F major with Madonna's voice spanning from the notes of C_{5} to B♭_{5}. "Spotlight" has a basic sequence of Am–C–Am–C–G–F as its chord progression.

== Critical response ==
Mark Bego, author of Madonna: Blonde Ambition wrote that "Spotlight" was a "typical Madonna 'look-at-me' dance routine, that sounds flat besides the heavy remixes in You Can Dance." Stephen Thomas Erlewine from Allmusic said that the song "sounds dated—this is quite clearly extended mixes from the mid 80's—but that's part of the charm." Dave Barry from The Miami Herald commented that although You Can Dance sounds like "old Madonna", "Spotlight" sounds surprisingly fresh to his ears. Joe Brown from The Washington Post commented that the song should have been a "flat reject". Don McLeese from Chicago Sun-Times called the song "exuberant". From the Dallas Observer, Hunter Hauk deemed it "the bastard brother of 'Into the Groove'. It's just as infectious, but it didn't get the support it deserved".

Dennis Hunt from Los Angeles Times commented that "[You Can Dance] is an attractive package for dance fans—particularly with the inclusion of a new cut, 'Spotlight'". He went on to add that the "lyrics of 'Spotlight' aren't great, but they're still more interesting than the others. Still, the words, like those of most dance songs, are just window dressing that's secondary to the beat. The big attraction of 'Spotlight' is a long, hard-driving, closing passage that's guaranteed to turn dancers on." Jan DeKnock, while writing for Orlando Sentinel, noted that the song was already receiving airplay from radio stations. In March 2023, Billboard ranked the song as Madonna's 94th greatest ever, as Joe Lynch called it a "lyrically simplistic affair that’s elevated by a pounding opener, sparkling keys and a charmingly earnest vocal that makes even the silliest sentiment sound like a viable philosophy for conquering the world".

== Chart performance ==
"Spotlight" was not released as a commercial single in the United States and thus was not eligible at the time to appear on the Billboard Hot 100. It was released promotionally, paired with "Where's The Party", and debuted on the publication's Hot 100 Airplay survey at 37 on the issue dated January 16, 1988. After three weeks, "Spotlight" reached a peak of 32, but fell to 40 the next week before exiting the chart. It also reached the Hot Crossover 30 chart beginning on the issue dated December 12, 1987, peaking at 15 for two consecutive weeks beginning January 9, 1988 and spending eight total weeks on the chart. The song was released commercially in Japan on April 25, 1988. "Spotlight" peaked at number 68 on the Oricon weekly singles chart, remaining on the chart for five weeks. It also charted on the Oricon international singles chart, reaching a peak of three on May 19, 1988, staying on the chart for ten weeks.

== Media appearance ==
"Spotlight" was featured in the last of a series of Japanese TV commercials Madonna filmed for electronics company Mitsubishi. The commercial promoted their VCR model F-5.3. In the commercial, Madonna was featured as coming out of a car and sitting down on a sofa, while watching a film on the VCR, as "Spotlight" is played in the background. The song was also used as cross-promotion for the Japanese leg of her 1987 Who's That Girl World Tour under the campaign name of "Dreams Come True".

== Formats and track listings ==
- Japanese and Philippine 7-inch vinyl; Japanese 3-inch/2-track CD single
1. "Spotlight" (You Can Dance Single Edit) – 4:32
2. "Where's the Party" (You Can Dance Single Edit) – 4:13

== Credits and personnel ==
- Madonna – vocals, songwriter
- Stephen Bray – songwriter, production
- Curtis Hudson – songwriter
- Shep Pettibone – audio mixing
- John "Jellybean" Benitez – additional mixing

Credits adapted from You Can Dance liner notes.

== Charts ==
=== Weekly charts ===
| Chart (1988) | Peak position |
|---|---|
| Italy Airplay (Music & Media) | 5 |
| Japanese Singles (Oricon) | 68 |
| Japanese International Singles (Oricon) | 3 |
| US Radio Songs (Billboard) | 32 |
| US Hot Crossover 30 (Billboard) | 15 |
| US Radio & Records CHR & Pop Charts | 31 |

== Bibliography ==
- Bego, Mark (2000). Madonna: blonde ambition. Cooper Square Press. ISBN 0-8154-1051-4.
- Erlewine, Stephen Thomas; Bogdanov, Vladimir; Woodstra, Chris (2002). All music guide to rock: the definitive guide to rock, pop, and soul. Hal Leonard Corporation. p. 1399. ISBN 0-87930-653-X.
- Rooksby, Rikky (2004). The Complete Guide to the Music of Madonna. Omnibus Press. ISBN 0-7119-9883-3.
- Schilling, Mark (1997). The Encyclopedia of Japanese pop culture. University of Michigan. ISBN 0-8348-0380-1.
- Taraborrelli, Randy J. (2002). Madonna: An Intimate Biography. Simon & Schuster. ISBN 0-7432-2709-3.
