= Jackie - Public, Private, Secret =

2023 book by J. Randy Taraborrelli

Jackie: Public, Private, Secret
- Author: J. Randy Taraborrelli
- Genre: Biography
- Publisher: St. Martin's
- Publication date: July 18, 2023
- Pages: 528
- ISBN: 9781250276216

Jackie - Public, Private, Secret is a 2023 book by J. Randy Taraborrelli about first lady Jacqueline Kennedy Onassis. The book includes a number of details about Kennedy's private life that had not previously been made public. The book debuted at Number Three on the New York Times bestselling list in July 2023, the author’s highest placement.

== Overview ==
The book is a result of over 25 years of research conducted by author J. Randy Taraborrelli. Taraborrelli met Jaqueline Kennedy during her years working in publishing. He utilized hundreds of interviews with friends and relatives of Kennedy in addition to papers from the John F. Kennedy Presidential Library and Museum that had not before been made public. The book details each stage of Jacqueline's life: her childhood, her marriage to John F. Kennedy, her life after her husband's assassination, and the end of her life.

== Reception ==
Publishers Weekly called it a "gossipy biography" though also called the book "readable and deeply researched".

The Kirkus Review called the book "An absorbing and comprehensive account of one of the most remarkable women of the 20th century."
