= List of European number-one hits of 1986 =

This is a list of the European Hot 100 Singles and European Top 100 Albums number ones of 1986, as published by Music & Media magazine (known as Eurotipsheet until April 1986).

== Chart history ==
Key
†	Indicates best-performing single and album of 1986

Issue date	Song	Artist	Album	Artist	Ref.
6 January	"Take On Me"	A-ha	Promise	Sade	
13 January	"Take On Me"	A-ha	Promise	Sade	
20 January	"Take On Me"	A-ha	Promise	Sade	
27 January	No chart published				
1 February	"Take On Me"	A-ha	Promise	Sade	
8 February	"Russians"	Sting	Promise	Sade	
15 February	"Say You, Say Me"	Lionel Richie	Promise	Sade	
22 February	"Say You, Say Me"	Lionel Richie	Promise	Sade	
1 March	"Burning Heart"	Survivor	Promise	Sade	
8 March	"Burning Heart"	Survivor	Promise	Sade	
15 March	"Burning Heart"	Survivor	Promise	Sade	
22 March	"Burning Heart"	Survivor	Promise	Sade	
29 March	"Burning Heart"	Survivor	Brothers in Arms	Dire Straits	
5 April	"Burning Heart"	Survivor	Brothers in Arms	Dire Straits	
12 April	"Burning Heart"	Survivor	Rocky IV	Soundtrack	
19 April	"When the Going Gets Tough, the Tough Get Going"	Billy Ocean	Rocky IV	Soundtrack	
26 April	"When the Going Gets Tough, the Tough Get Going"	Billy Ocean	Rocky IV	Soundtrack	
3 May	"Absolute Beginners"	David Bowie	Rocky IV	Soundtrack	
10 May	"A Different Corner"	George Michael	Dirty Work	Rolling Stones	
17 May	"A Different Corner"	George Michael	Brothers in Arms	Dire Straits	
24 May	"Live to Tell"	Madonna	Dirty Work	Rolling Stones	
31 May	"Live to Tell"	Madonna	Brothers in Arms	Dire Straits	
7 June	"Live to Tell"	Madonna	Dirty Work	Rolling Stones	
14 June	"Live to Tell"	Madonna	Brothers in Arms	Dire Straits	
21 June	"Live to Tell"	Madonna	So	Peter Gabriel	
28 June	"Live to Tell"	Madonna	So	Peter Gabriel	
5 July	"Live to Tell"	Madonna	A Kind of Magic	Queen	
12 July	"Live to Tell"	Madonna	A Kind of Magic	Queen	
19 July	"The Edge of Heaven"	Wham!	A Kind of Magic	Queen	
26 July	"The Edge of Heaven"	Wham!	A Kind of Magic	Queen	
2 August	"Papa Don't Preach" †	Madonna	True Blue †	Madonna	
9 August	"Papa Don't Preach" †	Madonna	True Blue †	Madonna	
16 August	"Papa Don't Preach" †	Madonna	True Blue †	Madonna	
23 August	"Papa Don't Preach" †	Madonna	True Blue †	Madonna	
30 August	"Papa Don't Preach" †	Madonna	True Blue †	Madonna	
6 September	"Papa Don't Preach" †	Madonna	True Blue †	Madonna	
13 September	"Papa Don't Preach" †	Madonna	True Blue †	Madonna	
20 September	"Papa Don't Preach" †	Madonna	True Blue †	Madonna	
27 September	"Holiday Rap"	MC Miker G & DJ Sven	True Blue †	Madonna	
4 October	"Holiday Rap"	MC Miker G & DJ Sven	True Blue †	Madonna	
11 October	"Holiday Rap"	MC Miker G & DJ Sven	True Blue †	Madonna	
18 October	"Holiday Rap"	MC Miker G & DJ Sven	True Blue †	Madonna	
25 October	"Holiday Rap"	MC Miker G & DJ Sven	True Blue †	Madonna	
1 November	"True Blue"	Madonna	True Blue †	Madonna	
8 November	"Take My Breath Away"	Berlin	True Blue †	Madonna	
15 November	"Take My Breath Away"	Berlin	True Blue †	Madonna	
22 November	"Take My Breath Away"	Berlin	True Blue †	Madonna	
29 November	"Take My Breath Away"	Berlin	True Blue †	Madonna	
6 December	"The Final Countdown"	Europe	True Blue †	Madonna	
13 December	"The Final Countdown"	Europe	True Blue †	Madonna	
20 December	"The Final Countdown"	Europe	True Blue †	Madonna	
27 December	No chart published				
