= Madonna (book) =

Book by Andrew Morton

- First edition (US)
- Author: Andrew Morton
- Subject: Madonna
- Genre: Biography
- Publisher: St. Martin's Press (US); Michael O'Mara Books (UK)
- Publication date: November 2001
- Publication place: United States
- Media type: Print
- Pages: 256
- ISBN: 978-1-854-79888-6

Madonna is a biography by English author Andrew Morton, chronicling the life of American recording artist Madonna. The book was released in November 2001 by St. Martin's Press in the United States and by Michael O'Mara Books in the United Kingdom. Morton decided to write a biography on Madonna in 2000. The release was announced in April 2001 by St. Martin's Press. President and publisher Sally Richardson described the biography to contain details about Madonna's ambitions, her relationships and her lifestyle.

Morton interviewed about 70 people who had known Madonna since her youth. He spent many evenings in bars and clubs in New York chatting to people—including artists, musicians, and directors—who had an interesting perspective on Madonna and the world. After its release, Madonna received mixed reviews from contemporary critics, who panned Morton's writing skills and felt that the book did not present anything new about the singer. The book was a commercial disappointment. In the United States, the book reached eight on The New York Times Best Seller list, and sold half of its initial print.

Madonna herself was critical of Morton writing a biography on her life, and sent a letter to him, asking him to stay away from her family and friends. Morton remained unabashed, saying that he wrote the book because of his interest in the star, not least because she has made a "difference" to pop culture and modern culture. In 2004, a lawsuit was filed against the author by Jim Albright, one of Madonna's ex-lovers mentioned in the book. The lawsuit regarded an image in the book, portraying one of Madonna's gay dancers—with Albright's name underneath. United States District Court ruled out the lawsuit explaining that stating someone is homosexual does not libel or slander them.

== Summary ==
The book opens with Madonna's birth, her early years in Michigan, and her 1977 move to New York City where she was involved with modern dance, two pop groups, composing, and releasing her 1983 debut album, Madonna. Her rise to superstardom as a pop icon is chronicled and her cutting-edge music videos, albums, first concert tour, film roles, and marriage and divorce to Sean Penn are examined. The book investigates her controversial religious imagery and her erotic productions, Erotica, Sex, and Body of Evidence. The book describes a mellowing in her appearance and provocativeness, and, among other things, the release of her next several albums, her Golden Globe Award-winning musical film portrayal of Eva Peron, and her high-grossing Drowned World Tour. The birth of her daughter and son are chronicled and her marriage to Guy Ritchie. Madonna includes detailed descriptions of her relationships with people including John F. Kennedy Jr. and Michael Jackson.

== Writing and development ==
"By dint of enterprise, creativity and dynamism, the very qualities that helped to make America, [Madonna] has established herself as a towering figure not only in the world of popular entertainment, but in modern culture."

— Andrew Morton, Highgate, London, September 2001

American journalist and celebrity biographer Andrew Morton is known for his works on Diana, Princess of Wales, Monica Lewinsky and footballer David Beckham and his wife, Victoria. In October 2000, Morton had hinted that he had American recording artist Madonna as his next project, when he responded to an Independent reader in "You Ask the Questions" section. Asked who he would most like to write a biography of, he said: "I've always admired Madonna as an intriguing and charismatic character who has been able to stay at the top for 20 years." A formal announcement was made by Morton's UK publicist Michael O'Mara in April 2001, that Morton had secured access to "those in her [Madonna's] inner circle, who have never been interviewed before, about her ambitions, lifestyle and relationships." O'Mara added the reason for choosing Madonna was because she was "one of the most enigmatic and fascinating women of our time, [and] is the undisputed female icon of the modern age."

The biography's American publishing rights were acquired by St. Martin's Press. President and publisher Sally Richardson described the biography to contain details about Madonna's ambitions, her relationships and her lifestyle. Richardson added that "Andrew loves complicated women, and has a genius for getting into their psyche and telling the world what makes them tick." Scheduled for release in November 2001, St. Martin's Press added that about 500,000 copies of the first print were ordered, and Morton received a six figure undisclosed amount as advance for writing the book. Madonna had always wanted to protect her privacy and reports had initially suggested that she was furious that Morton had decided to write the book, and commanded her friends and relatives not to give any interview to him. She added, "I don't want anyone talking to that snivelling little worm. How dare he invade my privacy?"

With the BBC, Morton detailed his "detective work" researching Madonna's life in New York, where she clambered her way up to fame and fortune. "Not only is she an interesting character, but all her friends and those who've known her are interesting characters too," he said. Morton spent many evenings in bars and clubs in New York chatting to people — including artists, musicians, directors — who had an interesting perspective on Madonna and the world. He interviewed about 70 people who had known Madonna since her youth. "I think I've come up with a very fresh picture," he said, adding that Dan Gilroy of Breakfast Club, who had introduced Madonna to the music world, had e-mailed him saying the biography had "really captured Madonna's spirit".

== Critical response ==
The book received mixed reviews. Richard Lautens from Toronto Star said that "Madonna is a thorough, if slightly workmanlike, retelling of its namesake's well-documented slog from lowly Midwestern beginnings to squeaky-voiced sex kitten to professional button-pusher to mother and respected, vaguely Bowie-esque, chameleonic figure, a cultural bloodhound always on the scent of the fresh, cool and credible." Helen Bushby from BBC commented that "[t]he book is certainly detailed, and will no doubt keep Madonna fanatics happy, although it is perhaps more of a reference book than a page-turner. But Morton is a good businessman, and is canny in his choice of subjects." Michael Sneed from Chicago Sun-Times gave a negative review of the book and felt that Morton's previous works had been better. George Rush from New York Daily News commented: "Despite her best efforts to discourage friends from cooperating with him, Andrew Morton has come forth with a book that portrays Madge as an insecure manipulator so ravenous for affection that she scared off some boyfriends, cheated on most of them and made a lot of foolish choices." In another review, Sherryl Connelly from the same publication was of the opinion that Madonna was mostly similar to J. Randy Taraborrelli's biography on her, Madonna: An Intimate Biography. She added, "At least, it's the story made familiar by Madonna, a woman who has always taken for granted the world's interest in her life."

Rick Thames, editor of The Charlotte Observer, criticized the book's packaging calling the cover as "tacky, hot pink-and-acid green sleeves, featuring an unflattering photo of the dished artist." Barry Didcock from Sunday Herald felt that "Morton [had failed] to find the face of Madonna." He criticized Morton's sketchy portrayal of Madonna's relationship with deceased artist Jean-Michel Basquiat, saying "he commits an error by doing so because, unusually for Madonna, this was a relationship of equals." Gregg Barrios from Daily Star was critical of the book, saying " The fatal flaw of these quickie knockoffs is that they have no real ending or any way of predicting what the fates have in store for Madonna Louise Penn [Guy Ritchie] nee Ciccone. Once the next Madonna tour, CD, marriage or film appears, their shelf life is cut short." Barbara Ellen from The Guardian criticized Morton's writing by saying, "Andrew Morton achieves the implausible: he takes an interesting woman and an astonishing life and makes them both seem incredibly boring in his life of Madonna.... Once you get used to Morton's pace (dull plod, with occasional snooze), it becomes quite amusing joining him on the journey, a bit like watching someone dragging a dead body around, trying to find some place to hide it. Even luminaries such as Madonna exes Sean Penn and Warren Beatty are reduced to flailing around like disenfranchised phantoms in the shallows of Morton's blandly automatic insight."

== Commercial reception ==
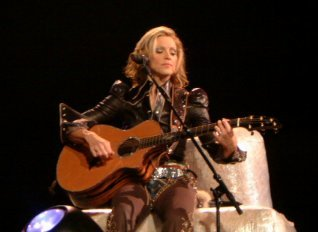
Madonna, seen here performing on the Drowned World Tour (2001), was not happy about Morton releasing the biography.

Madonna was released in hardback in the United States in November 2001. It debuted at position 15 on The New York Times Best Seller list, and reached eight the next week, but was present there for only two weeks. Madonna was still livid that Morton wrote the book without her permission, even saying "It's not a well-written book. We all know he wrote it for financial gain and the truth had little to do with it", after the book was released. With Jo Whiley from BBC Radio 1, she added that "[Morton] really went through my Rolodex and that part was really annoying, and I ended up writing him a letter saying, 'I'm not interested in you writing this book, I don't want to have anything to do with it – and please leave my friends alone'." The singer said that she had even sent Morton a book of philosophy—The Power of Kabbalah—to try to dissuade him from continuing. "It's a beginner's crash course in what it's all about – that eventually in some way shape or form it would come back round to him, but he either didn't read it or didn't care," Madonna added.

During the Drowned World Tour of 2001, Madonna was asked whether she had really sent the book for Morton's well-being. She replied sarcastically: "Why yes, I always send bibles and philosophy books to my biographers." Motioning to her then husband Guy Ritchie she continued, "Just ask my husband, he'll tell you that my greatest concern these days is not this fucking tour, or him or even our kids, why, it's Andrew Morton's spiritual enlightment of course." Her publicist Liz Rosenberg released a statement that "None of this [things in the biography] is true. I never saw a groom walk down an aisle with a bigger smile than Guy Ritchie," adding that Morton's claims were a retread of "tired old gossip. It's same old, same old." Morton remained unabashed, saying that he wrote the book because of his interest in the star, not least because she has made a "difference" to pop culture and modern culture. He added:

"I'm very proud of the book and I'm very disappointed at Madonna's reaction. I think the problem is that she wants control over everything – that's one of the themes of the book, and secondly she seems to be almost disowning her past at the moment. She's reinventing herself as an upper-class, English aristocrat, and the former vegetarian who now goes hunting, fishing and shooting. My door's always open – Madonna's welcome to my house for a cup of tea. She said she wasn't interested in doing any kind of biography or anything ever, which is a bit of a stern statement from someone who has been so out there. It doesn't matter whether it's me, Norman Mailer, whoever. I was disappointed because I felt that we've only ever seen the caricature, the cartoon version of Madonna and I really wanted to show that she is a considerable artist and that she is more than anything that has been written about her in the past. I think for her it is an opportunity missed."

== Lawsuit ==
Madonna faced a lawsuit in 2004 over an image in the book. Titled Amarak Productions, Inc. vs. Morton, Madonna's former bodyguard and ex-lover Jim Albright brought a defamation case against Morton and St. Martin's Press, based on an incorrect photo caption. Amarak Productions, Inc. had employed Albright as Madonna's bodyguard in 1992, and he had later become romantically involved with the singer. While writing the book, Morton had contacted Albright to gather information on their relationship. One of the picture's caption in the book identified the subject as Albright, but it was actually Madonna's gay back-up dancer Jose Gutierez. On discovering the misleading image, the lawsuit was filed by Albright who objected to the caption.

On 30 May 2004, US District judge Nancy Gertner ruled out the lawsuit explaining that stating someone is homosexual does not libel or slander them, particularly in light of new court decisions granting more LGBT rights. Gertner first rejected the idea that the mistake in the caption meant that it promoted Albright as gay. She added: "Private biases may be outside the reach of the law, but the law cannot, directly or indirectly give them effect. In this day and age, recent rulings by the Supreme Court and the Supreme Judiciary Court of Massachusetts undermine any suggestion that a statement implying that an individual is homosexual is defamatory."

== Publication history ==
Region	Release date	Format	Ref
United States	6 November 2001	Hardcover	
United States	1 October 2002	Paperback	
United Kingdom	6 November 2001	Hardcover	
United Kingdom	27 March 2002	Paperback	
United Kingdom	30 June 2004	Audio CD; MP3 edition	
