= William McKeen =

American author and educator

William McKeen is an American author and educator. He is professor and former chairman of the Department of Journalism at Boston University.

== Biography ==
McKeen was born in Indianapolis September 16, 1954, he was raised in England, Germany, Nebraska, Florida and Texas. His father was an Air Force flight surgeon who retired to private practice in Bloomington, Indiana, in 1968.

McKeen has seven children: Sarah, Graham and Mary (from his first marriage), and Savannah, Jackson, Travis and Charley (from his second marriage).

== Published work ==
McKeen has written and/or edited a dozen books, including Outlaw Journalist (W.W. Norton, 2008), his critically acclaimed biography of writer Hunter S. Thompson.

McKeen's most recent book is Everybody Had An Ocean (Chicago Review Press, 2017), a non-fiction narrative about music and mayhem in Los Angeles in the Sixties. Other recent books include Too Old to Die Young (Dredger's Lane, 2015), a collection of essays and stories; Homegrown in Florida (University Press of Florida, 2012), a book of stories about childhood in Florida; and Mile Marker Zero (Crown Books, 2011), a non-fiction narrative about the writers, artists, musicians and actors in Key West in the Seventies.

== Critical reception ==
His earlier books include Highway 61 (W.W. Norton, 2003), Rock and Roll is Here to Stay (W.W. Norton, 2000), Literary Journalism (Wadsworth, 2000), Tom Wolfe (Twayne, 1995) and several earlier books on popular culture. His writing has appeared in Maxim, American History, Holiday, The Saturday Evening Post and many other newspapers and magazines. Before beginning his academic career, he was a newspaper reporter and copy editor in Indiana, Florida and Oklahoma. He was associate editor of The American Spectator and The Saturday Evening Post, where he helped compile The American Story (Curtis, 1975).

Writer Tom Wolfe called Mile Marker Zero "a tall but telescopic-sight-true tale of Hunter Thompson, Jimmy Buffett, Tom McGuane, and a large cavorting cast running around with sand in their shoes at 'ground zero for lust and greed and most of the other deadly sins,' Key West." Historian Douglas Brinkley said it was "a wonderful zinger of a book. Every page sings a story worth a Jimmy Buffett song." Wayne Curtis, writing in the Wall Street Journal, called the book "a romp" and said McKeen had committed "deft storytelling." The book earned a Florida Book Award Gold Medal in 2012.

Christopher Hitchens, writing in the Sunday Times of London, called Outlaw Journalist "admirable and haunting." In the Washington Post, book editor Jonathan Yardley wrote that McKeen "gets it all in: the boozing and drugging, the violence, but also the intelligence, the loyalty, the inherent decency."

== Education and academic career ==
McKeen earned his bachelor's degree in history and his master's in journalism, both from Indiana University. He earned his Ph.D. from the University of Oklahoma.

McKeen teaches courses on journalism history, literary journalism and rock n' roll and American culture. He taught at Western Kentucky University and the University of Oklahoma before joining the University of Florida faculty in 1986. He taught there until 2010, and chaired the journalism department from 1998 until 2010, before moving to a similar position at Boston University. He was also named to Hunter S. Thompson's Honor Roll in 2003 and cited as one of America's Eight Most-Fun Professors by Playboy magazine in 1993. For the 2016–2017 academic year, he served as associate dean of the College of Communication.
