= Pure Energy (band) =

- Genres: Dance-pop, post-disco
- Years active: 1980–1984
- Labels: Prism Records

Pure Energy was an American disco and post-disco music group best known for their various club hits such as "You've Got the Power", "Breakaway" and "Love Game". The band comprised Curtis Hudson, Lisa Stevens, Raymond Hudson. Wade Hudson was Pure Energy's manager.

Two members of the group, Curtis Hudson and Lisa Stevens, also wrote the 1983 Madonna hit "Holiday". They are also mother & father to Grammy winner, super producer & musician Eric Hudson, who has written & produced songs for John Legend, Whitney Houston & Chris Brown, just to name a few.

== History ==
The group first signed to Prism Records in 1980 to record a disco and R&B- influenced eponymous album which spawned two albums, namely "Party On" (1980) and the single off that same album "You've Got the Power".

In 1982, the group released "Breakaway" and "Too Hot" which entered the Billboard Dance charts, both written by Raymond Hudson, Curtis Hudson, and Lisa Stevens.

In 1983, they recorded two Italo disco-influenced boogie songs, "Spaced Out" and "Love Game". Although not charted, Billboard magazine listed "Spaced Out" among its Top Single Picks in the "recommended" section. The second song, however, peaked at number #30 on the Billboard Dance chart. "Love Game" was remixed by Morales and Munzibai.

In 1984, they recorded a freestyle song titled "One Hot Night", written by the group members.

Shortly after their final release, Pure Energy split up.

== Discography ==
=== Studio albums ===
Title	Album details
Pure Energy	• Released: 1980 • Label: Prism Records • Formats: LP

=== Singles ===
Year	Title	Label	Peak chart positions	
Year	Title	Label	U.S. Dance	U.S. R&B
1980	"Party On"	Prism Records	#7	#93
1981	"When You're Dancing"	Prism Records	#35	―
1982	"Breakaway"	Prism Records	#20	―
1982	"Too Hot"	Prism Records	#57	―
1982	"You've Got the Power"	Prism Records	#65	―
1983	"Love Game"	Prism Records	#30	―
1983	"Spaced Out"	Prism Records	―	―
1984	"One Hot Night"	Prism Records	―	―
