= Madonna: An Intimate Biography =

2001 book by J. Randy Taraborrelli

- Hardcover book (UK edition, 2001)
- Author: J. Randy Taraborrelli
- Subject: Madonna
- Genre: Biography
- Publisher: Sidgwick & Jackson
- Publication date: April 2001
- Publication place: United Kingdom
- Media type: Print
- Pages: 416
- ISBN: 978-1-4165-8346-2

Madonna: An Intimate Biography is a book by American author J. Randy Taraborrelli, chronicling the life of American singer Madonna. The book was released in April 2001 by Sidgwick & Jackson in the United Kingdom, and in the United States by Simon & Schuster in August 2001. Taraborrelli first considered writing the book in 1990, but, realizing the project might be premature in respect to Madonna's fledgling career, set it aside. He began writing the book in 1996, when Madonna gave birth to her daughter Lourdes.

Other books about Madonna's life and career had been based on previously published material, but Taraborrelli's biography was the result of research spanning a decade and includes exclusive interviews with Madonna's close friends, business associates, family members, and her father, Tony Ciccone. These interviews were conducted by the author himself, as well as his team of private investigators. Taraborrelli also interviewed Madonna over the course of years, and often drew from his first-hand experiences while writing the book. Madonna: An Intimate Biography received a mixed response from critics. Some considered it a compelling piece on Madonna's life, while others thought Taraborrelli's writing was unprofessional.

== Summary ==
The book opens with Madonna's birth, her early years in Michigan, and her 1977 move to New York City where she was involved with modern dance, two pop groups, composing, and releasing her 1983 debut album, Madonna. Her rise to superstardom as a pop icon is chronicled and her cutting edge music videos, albums, first concert tour, film roles, and marriage to and divorce from Sean Penn are examined. The book investigates her controversial religious imagery and her erotic productions, Erotica, Sex, and Body of Evidence. The book describes a mellowing in her appearance and provocativeness, and, among other things, the release of her next several albums, her Golden Globe Award-winning musical film portrayal of Eva Peron, and her high-grossing Drowned World Tour. The births of daughter Lourdes and son Rocco, and her marriage to second husband Guy Ritchie, are chronicled.

== Development ==
American journalist and celebrity biographer J. Randy Taraborrelli first met Madonna at a press conference in 1983. She spoke of her youthful struggles before the release of her debut album, and of her belief that she would someday enjoy great success as the "century's biggest star". Taraborrelli thought her brash, cocky, petulant, self-indulgent, and a mediocre beauty with a voice to match.

Taraborrelli was proven wrong, and, in 1990, he considered writing her biography, but put the thought aside, thinking such a venture was premature. He pointed out that "most subjects need time for evolution and personal growths, before their stories are ripe enough to put on paper. Madonna was in an ambitious, self-involved phase during which nothing mattered more to her than her career." He picked up the writing again in 1994, but felt the same way about her, and hoped the time would come when the singer would focus on her personal life, rather than her career. A personal evolution occurred in her life with the birth of daughter Lourdes in 1996, and it was then that Taraborrelli sensed the time was ripe to begin writing her biography.

== Writing and release ==
"While it may not always be easy to find the real Madonna amidst the hocus-pocus of public relations she manufactures to hide her true self, she's there just the same. In pursuit of her, one has to be perceptive enough to look beyond the thick smoke, away from the confusing mirrors."

— J. Randy Taraborrelli

Taraborrelli decided to focus on the singer's private life; who she really was. Many books about the superstar were based on previously published material, but Taraborrelli had ten years of research to draw upon including interviews with people who had not spoken about Madonna in public and his own interviews with the icon. Taraborrelli and his team of private investigators interviewed Madonna's close friends, business associates, and family members including her father Silvio Ciccone.

While researching the book, Taraborrelli realized that one of the greatest misconceptions about Madonna was that she was cold and unemotional in her personal relationships. His research found this to be untrue and Taraborrelli cited as an example the icon's 1990 relationship with actor Warren Beatty. Their relationship was generally perceived as nothing more than promotion for their film, Dick Tracy, and Madonna was regarded as opportunistic. Taraborrelli unearthed that Madonna actually had strong feelings for Beatty. The actor however was not as emotionally invested as Madonna, and the relationship ended with her heart being broken.

The author believed that readers would be surprised by "the many times that Madonna has ended up feeling alone and rejected. She has built her entire career on an image of indestructibility. But at least in her personal life, and again, I make that distinction, because this isn't necessarily true in her business life, she is one of the most fragile subjects I've ever written about... This book is really about placing her life into the proper historical context, and once again answering the why questions about her." Taraborrelli has written updated versions of the book, released in 2008 and 2018, the latter to commemorate Madonna turning 60 years old. The updated versions had reconstructed thoughts expressed in some areas, based on the author's current perception. He also added commentary and stories he found relevant to be added to Madonna's legacy.

== Critical response ==
The book received mixed reviews. Caroline Foulkes wrote in The Birmingham Post: "The thing about this biography is the depths to which Taraborrelli has dug to get information on a famously controlling woman. He relates revealing anecdotes as if they were mere bagatelle, making News of the World style revelations look like kid's stuff. If Taraborrelli were to include in his list of acknowledgments 'thanks to the maid who let me into Madonna's bedroom to raid her underwear drawer', it wouldn't be any great surprise." She also felt that "despite the sensationalism, Taraborrelli's writing style lets him down. Too often it descends into the kind of mush you expect from an airport novel, with the singer coming across more like a character from Shirley Conran's Lace than a real woman." Peter Sobczynski reviewed the book for the Post-Tribune and felt that "the problem with writing an unauthorized tell-all biography is that, in this information-rich world that we live in, by the time a book gets written on somebody, most of the juicy stories are already common knowledge. To make up for that, the tell-all author needs to fill his or her pages with either a thoughtful analysis of the subject at hand, or, frankly, newer and better dirt. Unfortunately, celebrity biographer J. Randy Taraborrelli does neither with his latest concoction, Madonna: An Intimate Biography."

William Leith of the London Evening Standard noted that "Taraborrelli's theory, that Madonna, having been bereaved at the age of five, became driven, both sexually and in other ways, is believable. But is it true? In the end, you'll make up your own mind. This is a book you will find yourself 'just dipping into' for hours at a stretch", and John Smyntek from Knight Ridder thought "Taraborrelli [is] retelling all [the known facts about Madonna] and more. After all, in those 10 years, the Great Woman has had two children, wed and maintained her image as a major pain in the keister. He does a great job of bringing forth these unknown facts." Ward Triplet of the Kansas City Star felt that although the book is "an eerie, but compelling day by day account of Madonna, and how she became who she is, sometimes Taraborrelli feels like revealing more about his process of writing than his subject", and Ann O' Neil in the Los Angeles Times complimented the book for being "different" from the "regular dirt written everyday about Madonna."

Sylvia Sharma from The Daily Mirror felt that "Taraborrelli's rummage through Madge's life can bring you to shame. This is the Madonna biography all had been waiting for, this is who she is. Not the staunch woman that we see, but a woman who is no different than one of us." Mike Thomas from the Chicago Sun-Times said that "Filled with private details from Madonna's life, Taraborrelli gives us the first in-depth look at the Material Girl in more than a decade. The following outtakes from friends, former friends, Taraborrelli and Madonna herself were hand-picked for your perusing pleasure. Or displeasure. Madonna, as with all pop icons, is an acquired taste."

== Publication history ==
Region	Release date	Format
United Kingdom	April 20, 2001	Hardcover
United Kingdom	April 12, 2002	Paperback
United Kingdom	February 1, 2008	Paperback – Extended edition
United Kingdom	April 9, 2008	Amazon Kindle
United States	June 6, 2002	Paperback
United States	October 18, 2007	Paperback – Special edition
United States	July 10, 2018	Hardcover (60th birthday)
