= Mark Bego =

American biographer

- Born: Mark Joseph Bego; September 23, 1952 (age 73); Pontiac, Michigan, U.S.
- Occupations: Author, writer
- Writing career
- Language: English
- Genres: Non-fiction
- Subjects: Rock and roll, show business, music

Mark Joseph Bego (born September 23, 1952, in Pontiac, Michigan) is an author known for his biographies on the rock and roll and show business genres. Bego has written 59 books, two of which have gone on to become New York Times Best Sellers. Bego has written biographies about notable people in entertainment, including Linda Ronstadt, Elton John, Aretha Franklin, Elvis Presley, Michael Jackson, Madonna, Billy Joel, Patsy Cline, Leonardo DiCaprio, and Whitney Houston.

== Early career ==
From 1978 to 1980, he was the Nightlife Editor for Manhattan's Cue, covering everything from Studio 54 to all of the jazz and cabaret clubs in the city. From 1983 to 1985, he was editor-in-chief of Modern Screen. His writing has also appeared in People, US, Billboard, Record World, Cosmopolitan, Star, and National Enquirer.

== As author ==
Bego's book on singer Michael Jackson, titled For Michael!, was released a week after the infamous Pepsi Cola commercial in which Jackson's hair caught fire. The book sold three million copies in the United States alone and landed on the New York Times Best Sellers for six weeks. Bego also had the chance to travel with Jackson and his brothers on the "Victory!" Tour, and subsequently wrote the book On The Road With Michael!

He has also written books with Micky Dolenz of The Monkees (I'm a Believer), Debbie Gibson (Between the Lines), and Jimmy Greenspoon of Three Dog Night (One is the Loneliest Number). In addition, Bego has written a book called One Minute Before Another Midnight with Ruth Mueller. Bego's book subjects have ranged from Elvis Presley, Linda Ronstadt, Whitney Houston, Bonnie Raitt, Julia Roberts, Joni Mitchell, Billy Joel, and Jackson Browne to Cher and Bette Midler. In 1994, his more general books published included Country Gals (life stories of Reba McEntire, Dolly Parton, Tanya Tucker, and other famed women in country music), and Country Hunks (spotlighting Vince Gill, Billy Ray Cyrus, George Strait and others). Bego also authored the reference books TV Rock (The History of Rock & Roll on Television) and The Rock & Roll Almanac. He has also written books about Hollywood in its heyday The Best of "Modern Screen", and Rock Hudson: Public and Private. Bego wrote a memoir with Memphis Mafia member Lamar Fike called An Uncommon Journey: On Elvis Presley Boulevard. He co-wrote a screenplay based on the book called '57 to '60: One of the Boys.

At the height of the box-office success of the film Titanic, Bego wrote the biography of the movie's star, Leonardo DiCaprio: A Romantic Hero. It spent six weeks on The New York Times Best Seller list in 1998.

In 2008, Bego published his 51st pop culture book, written with Randy Jones of Village People, entitled Macho Man. Bego penned his own show business memoir, Paperback Writer. Cindy Adams in The New York Post wrote about the book, "Paperback Writer ... a tell-all telling things he couldn't tell in previous books – like Aretha Franklin cooking chicken, and when the chicken was finished, so was the interview." Paperback Writer hit Number Two on The Book Soup paperback Best Seller List. Bego frequently is seen on television speaking about showbusiness, on such shows as Entertainment Tonight, Biography, and True Hollywood Story.

In 2009, Bego released a biography of Elton John. In the summer of 2009, Bego appeared on ABC talking about Michael Jackson's death.

In 2019, along with Mary Wilson of The Supremes, Bego helped pen Supreme Glamour, a coffee table book chronicling the gowns and stage wear of the group. The foreword was written by Whoopi Goldberg.

== See also ==
- Supreme Glamour. Publishers Weekly. 2019;266(27):79. Accessed June 21, 2025.
- Mark Bego. Baker & Taylor Author Biographies. January 2000:1. Accessed June 21, 2025.
- Mark Bego. Perseus Author Biographies. January 2009:230. Accessed June 21, 2025.
- Abbott C, Gold SF, Rotella M, Zaleski J. CHER (Book review). Publishers Weekly. 2001;248(32):78. Accessed June 21, 2025.
- Gold SF, Chenoweth E, Rotella M, Andriani L, Reiss J, Zaleski J. TINA TURNER: Break Every Rule (Book). Publishers Weekly. 2003;250(43):55. Accessed June 21, 2025.
- Gold SF, Chenoweth E, Zaleski J. BETTE MIDLER (Book). Publishers Weekly. 2002;249(44):74. Accessed June 21, 2025.
- Jones ME. Just One More Question: Answers and Insights from a Psychic Medium. Library Journal. 2006;131(3):135. Accessed June 21, 2025.
- Aretha Franklin: The Queen of Soul. Publishers Weekly. 2012;259(9):78. Accessed June 21, 2025.
- Rocket Man: The Life of Elton John. Publishers Weekly. 2019;266(43):94-95. Accessed June 21, 2025.
