= J. Randy Taraborrelli =

American journalist and celebrity biographer

- Born: Philadelphia, Pennsylvania, U.S.
- Known for: Biographies, news reporting, journalism
- Notable work: Jackie - Public, Private, Secret, Jackie, Janet & Lee
- Website: jrandytaraborrelli.com

John Randall Anthony Taraborrelli is an American journalist and celebrity biographer. Prior to his book-writing career, he was a magazine journalist and editor-in-chief of Soul magazine, the black entertainment title. Taraborrelli is known for biographies of contemporary entertainers and political figures such as Frank Sinatra, Diana Ross, Marilyn Monroe, Michael Jackson, Madonna, the Kennedy family, the Hilton family, and Beyoncé. He also regularly appears on television as an entertainment news reporter on programs such as Entertainment Tonight, Good Morning America, Today and CBS This Morning. Taraborrelli lives in California.

== Writing style ==
In a 2015 interview with Gawker, Taraborrelli described his evolution as a writer:

I think as you get older as a writer, your standards change. When I was a kid, my standard was very simple: If it was true, I put it in my book. That was it. There was no wiggle room to that. I’ve been through enough in my lifetime to realize there has to be more of a standard in biography than just the truth. There has to be an eye toward empathy. There has to be an eye toward understanding interpretation. There’s a lot of nuance that goes into a biography that is bigger than whether or not something is true. When I was a kid, it was a simpler time. Today, I weigh everything on a moral compass. It has to do with: Is it fair? Is it hurtful? Is it going to cause people pain? That’s a big part of my process today that when I was a kid, I never considered.

Taraborrelli's book, Jackie - Public, Private, Secret, debuted at #3 on The New York Times Best Seller list on August 6, 2023. The follow up, JFK: Public, Private, Secret, debuted at #4 on the New York Times Best Seller list on August 10, 2025.

== Reviews ==
Kirkus Reviews found Cher – A Biography to be "a fun read, and even moving". The Observer reviewed Diana Ross – A Biography as "fawning" and while acknowledging the comprehensiveness of the book, regretted that the writer held back unfavorable information about the subject because he was a personal fan. It said The Secret Life of Marilyn Monroe was written by "an indefatigable gossip hound" and criticized his vocabulary. The Gay & Lesbian Review said that Michael Jackson – The Magic, the Madness, the Whole Story was a "comprehensive and even-handed biography". The New York Times called Jackie, Janet & Lee "deliciously readable".

== Bibliography ==
- Diana: A Celebration of the Life and Career of Diana Ross (1985)
- Cher – A Biography (1986; updated in 1992)
- Motown: Hot Wax, City Cool and Solid Gold (1986; updated in 1988)
- Laughing Till It Hurts – The Complete Life and Career of Carol Burnett (1988)
- Call Her Miss Ross (1989; updated in 2007 as Diana Ross – A Biography)
- Michael Jackson – The Magic and the Madness (1991; updated in 2003 and 2004. In 2009, the book was updated as Michael Jackson – The Magic, the Madness, the Whole Story)
- Sinatra – Behind the Legend (1997; updated in 1998 and 2015)
- Jackie, Ethel and Joan: Women of Camelot (2000)
- Madonna: An Intimate Biography (2001; updated in 2002, 2007 and 2018)
- Once Upon a Time: Behind the Fairytale of Princess Grace and Prince Rainier (2003)
- Elizabeth (2006)
- The Secret Life of Marilyn Monroe (2009)
- Michael Jackson - The Magic, The Madness, The Whole Story (2009)
- After Camelot: A Personal History of the Kennedy Family - 1968 to Present (2012)
- The Hiltons: The True Story of an American Dynasty (2014)
- Sinatra - Behind The Legend (rewritten and updated) (2015)
- Becoming Beyoncé - The Untold Story (2015)
- Jackie, Janet & Lee: The Secret Lives of Janet Auchincloss and Her Daughters, Jacqueline Kennedy Onassis and Lee Radziwill (2018)
- Madonna: An Intimate Biography of an Icon at Sixty (updated) (2018)
- The Kennedy Heirs: John, Caroline, and the New Generation - A Legacy of Triumph and Tragedy (2019)
- Grace & Steel: Dorothy, Barbara, Laura, and the Women of the Bush Dynasty (2021)
- Jackie: Public, Private, Secret (2023)
- JFK: Public, Private, Secret (2025)
