= Who's That Girl World Tour =

1987 concert tour by Madonna

- Tour by Madonna
- Promotional poster for the tour
- Location: Asia; Europe; North America
- Associated albums: True Blue; Who's That Girl
- Start date: June 14, 1987
- End date: September 6, 1987
- Legs: 3
- No. of shows: 38
- Supporting act: Level 42
- Box office: US$25 million (Note: US$70.85 million in 2025 dollars.)

Madonna concert chronology
- The Virgin Tour (1985); Who's That Girl World Tour (1987); Blond Ambition World Tour (1990)

The Who's That Girl World Tour (billed as Who's That Girl World Tour 1987) was the second concert tour by American singer and songwriter Madonna. The tour supported her 1986 third studio album True Blue, as well as the 1987 soundtrack Who's That Girl. It started on June 14, 1987, at the Osaka Stadium in Osaka, Japan, and ended on September 6 of the same year at the Stadio Artemio Franchi in Florence, Italy. It was Madonna's first world tour and marked her first visits to Japan and Europe. Musically and technically superior to her previous Virgin Tour, Who's That Girl incorporated multimedia components to make the show more appealing.

Madonna trained physically doing aerobics, jogging and weight-lifting, to cope with the choreography and the dance routines. For the costumes, she collaborated with designer Marlene Stewart, expanding on the idea of bringing her popular video characters to life onstage, reworking scenes from her music videos. The stage had four video screens, multimedia projectors and a flight of stairs in the middle. Patrick Leonard, who was the musical director, encouraged Madonna to go with the idea of remixing and presenting her older songs for the show.

The show consisted of seven costume changes, with song-and-dance routines, theatrics and addressing social causes. The tour was critically appreciated, with reviewers commending the extravagant nature of the concert and Madonna as a performer. It was a commercial success, grossing in total of US$25 million by playing in front of 1.5 million audience. According to Pollstar, it was the second highest-grossing female concert tour of 1987, behind Tina Turner's Break Every Rule Tour.

Who's That Girl was broadcast in a number of international television channels and was released on VHS titled Ciao Italia: Live from Italy. Biographer J. Randy Taraborrelli commented that "Many female artists behave like a diva for a period when they reach superstar status, and the 'Who's That Girl?' tour marked the beginning of Madonna's." It is also noted for giving rise to the term "new Madonna", a stronger and more intelligent sexual image of her former self which had given rise to the term Madonna wannabe. It was proposed to build a statue of the Madonna in the city of her paternal grandparents in Pacentro, Italy, but the idea was rejected by the local city hall.

== Background ==
Madonna's 1987 film Who's That Girl was a box office failure, however the soundtrack of the film proved to be a big success. The album consisted of four Madonna songs, along with tracks by Warner Bros. Records' acts including Club Nouveau, Scritti Politti and Michael Davidson. Three of Madonna's songs were released as singles, namely: "Who's That Girl", "Causing a Commotion" and "The Look of Love"; all of them were critically and commercially successful.

The album sold a million copies in the United States, and five million worldwide. Taraborrelli felt that at that moment, riding on Madonna's coattails proved profitable for everyone involved, including Warner Bros. Records, which notched up big sales with a compilation soundtrack album that was basically a showcase for its marginal artists. But still they wanted to "milk-in" the success of Madonna, a view shared by Peter Guber and Jon Peters, executive producers of the film. Hence they felt a worldwide concert tour was the appropriate thing to do, since it would promote both the soundtrack and the film, as well as Madonna's successful third studio album True Blue, released the year before. As Madonna's first world tour, Who's That Girl ended up being a resounding success, although by its end, Madonna declared that she did not want to hear any of her songs again and she did not know whether she would ever write another one. "I returned feeling so burned out and I was convinced that I wouldn't go near music for quite a while", she said.

== Development ==
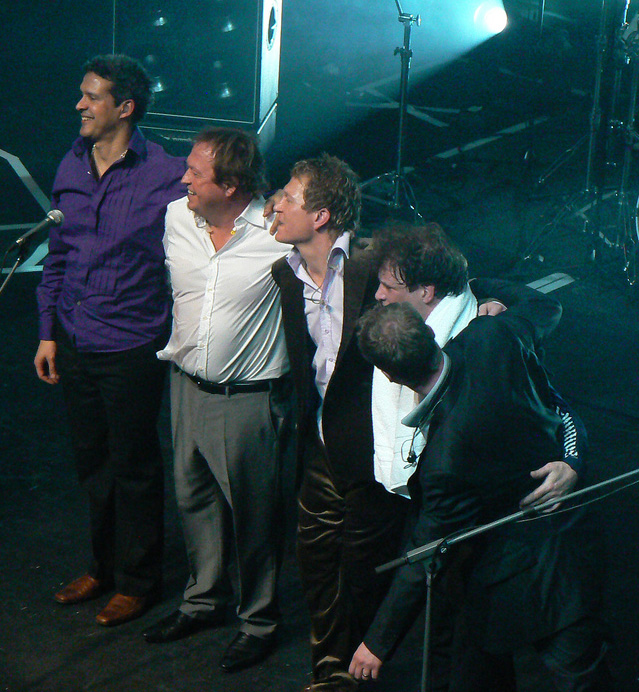
British funk band Level 42 joined Madonna as the supporting opening act for the tour.

The Who's That Girl World Tour was musically and technically superior to Madonna's Virgin Tour, because she incorporated multimedia components to make the show more compelling. As the tour was confirmed, Madonna and her team started planning for it. Madonna wanted a show which consisted of theatrics, drama, dance and choreography in "full-force". Her publicist Liz Rosenberg commented, "She wants a visual impact that would knock people out. She was very determined about this. And she's the type that makes decisions quickly; If something doesn't work, she starts over. You'll see a different look this year, but it's still Madonna, still bigger than life." In order to engage herself completely and handle the grueling dance routines, she started attending aerobics classes at Hollywood health centre The Sports Connection. By the time the tour drew nearer, she hired a personal trainer, and her daily routine involved jogging, weight-lifting, dancing, gymnastics, trampoline, swimming and cycling. She started eating vegetarian food with plenty of protein and carbohydrate and avoided the sun. British funk band Level 42 was the supporting act of the tour. Madonna's image was that of a blond girl with soft curls, making a striking contrast with the firm, almost hard lines of her eye make-up and lipstick; the idea of her friend, actress Debi Mazar.

For the costumes, Madonna collaborated with designers Marlene Stewart and Leslie Hamel. She expanded on the idea of bringing her popular video characters to life onstage, reworking scenes from "True Blue", "Open Your Heart", "Papa Don't Preach" and "La Isla Bonita". For "Open Your Heart", Madonna reused the Stewart designed with Trashy Lingerie black bustier worn by her in the video, complete with tassels, golden tips and ribbing with fishnets on leg. Leslie Hamel's designs included the Flamenco style dress for "La Isla Bonita" and Spanish inspired pants for Holiday and a gold lamé jacket and pants for the "White Heat" sequence. The True Blue performance dress and the male dancers outfits.For the medley sequence, Madonna used a dress that was visually amusing and, according to Madonna, was for "anyone that takes me too seriously, or imagined and I take myself too seriously." Inspired by Dame Edna Everage, the Leslie Hamel designed dress consisted of a hat strewn with fake fruits, flowers and feathers, jeweled batwing spectacles with heavy, black frames, a ruffled skirt and a bodice covered with objects such as watches and dolls and fishnets. The knickers were inscribed with the word "Kiss". Continuing her tradition of message clothes, she spelt out the phrase "You Can Dance" on her Leslie Hamel jacket, using the letter U, a can of soup and the word "dance" at the back.

Calling the show a "theatrical multimedia spectacular", Madonna wanted a huge stage with a central platform from which a flight of stairs descended. The central platform was flanked by two lower platforms, which housed the band and the musicians. A large video screen was suspended above the stairs, which descended during the show. Two projectors were situated at the front of the stage, which projected images of The Pope and President Ronald Reagan during the show. Patrick Leonard, who had produced True Blue, joined as the musical director for the shows. Instead of following every note on the records, Leonard encouraged the musicians to come up with new ideas for the songs. Hence a number of the old songs were rearranged, including introducing a medley of "Dress You Up", "Material Girl" and "Like a Virgin"—which contained a sample from the Four Tops song "I Can't Help Myself (Sugar Pie Honey Bunch)". American choreographer Shabba Doo was signed to choreograph the show. 13-year-old Christopher Finch was signed to play the part of the small boy from the "Open Your Heart" video, since Felix Howard, who played the original part, did not get a working license, and hence could not join the tour. Madonna wanted three backup singers, a team of male dancers and a succession of costume changes. She took inputs from her then husband, actor Sean Penn saying, "I really respect Sean's opinion. He has great taste and is a very brilliant man. When I was putting my tour together, it was always in the back of my mind: 'I wonder what Sean will think of this?' He's extremely opinionated and has really high standards, and that sometimes pushed me into making decisions I wouldn't have otherwise made." Madonna explained that the title of the tour came from her playing many characters, commenting:

"That's why I call the tour 'Who's That Girl?'; because I play a lot of characters, and every time I do a video or a song, people go, 'Oh, that's what she's like.' And I'm not like any of them. I'm all of them. I'm none of them. You know what I mean.?"

== Concert synopsis ==
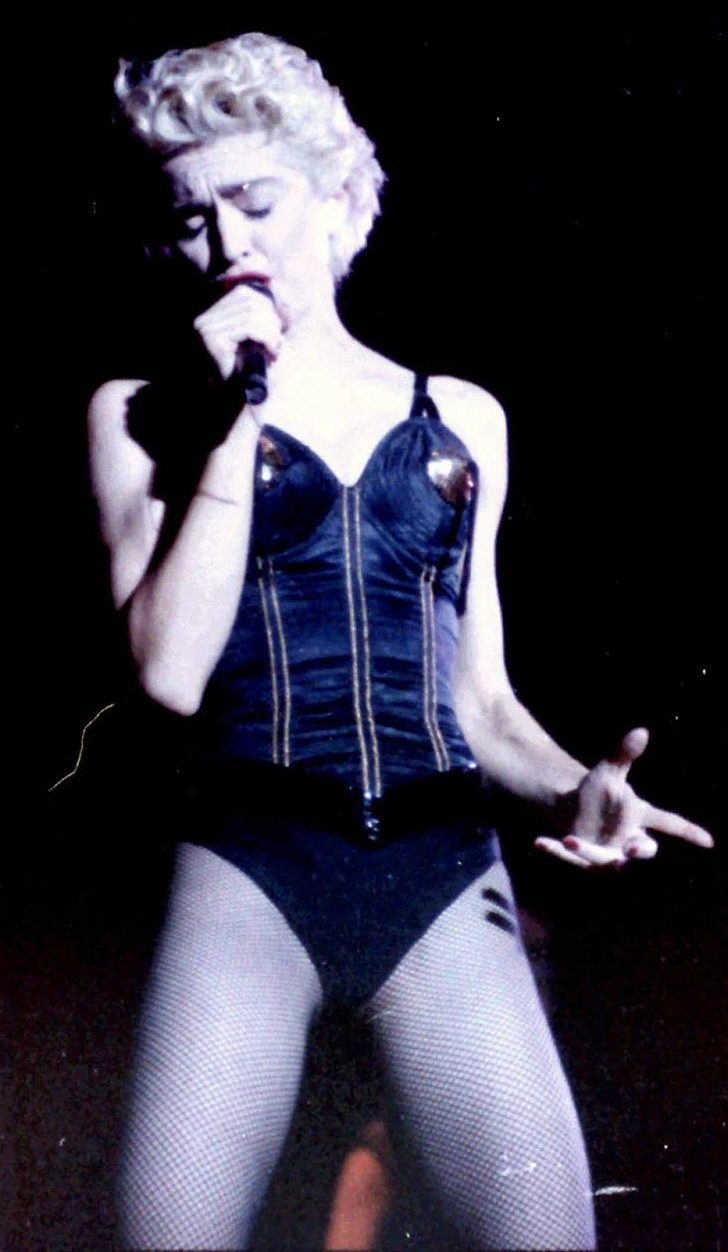
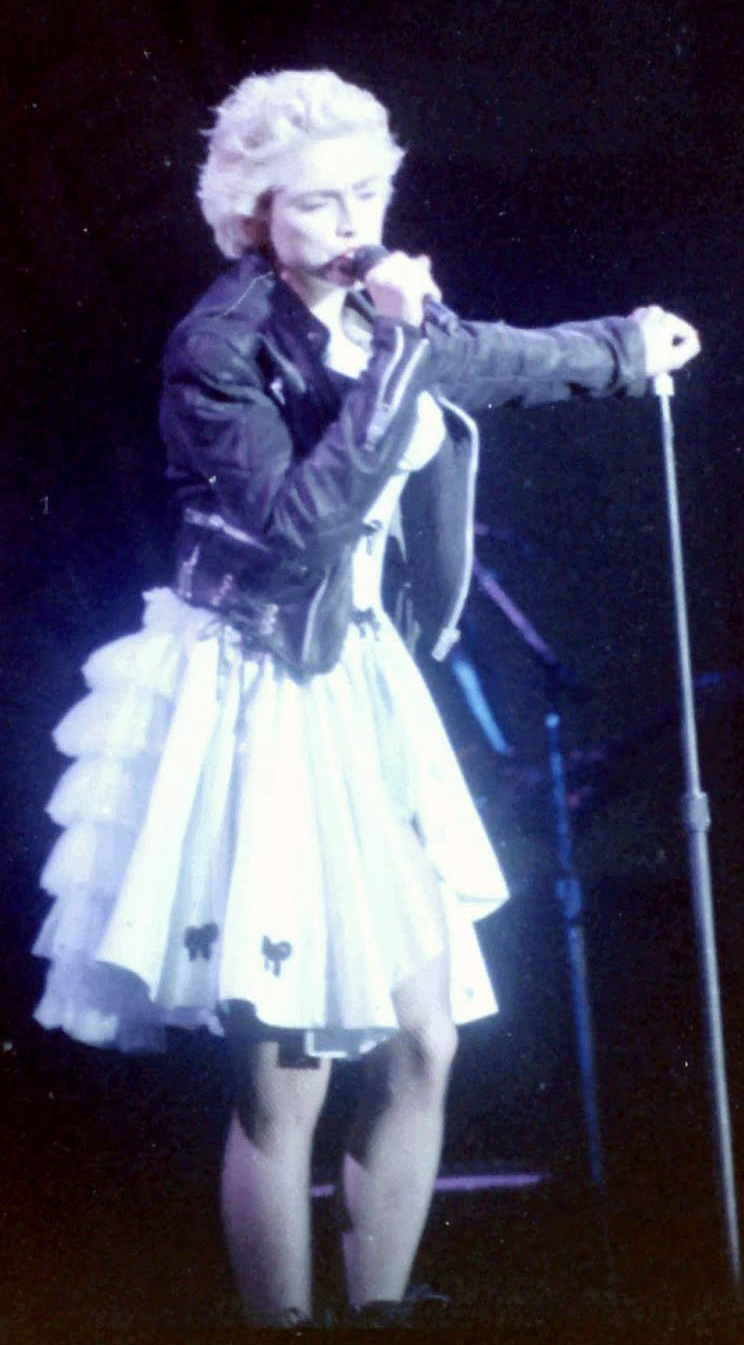
Madonna opening the concert with a performance of "Open Your Heart" wearing a black Trashy Lingerie bustier (left). For "Papa Don't Preach", she wore a leather jacket over a silk blue dress (right).

The show started with a performance by Level 42. As their performance ended, the lights started blinking all around the stadium and Finch appears on stage, looking for Madonna. He is followed by two other dancers, who jump around the stage and disappear. Then Madonna's silhouette is visible behind a screen which has paintings by Tamara de Lempicka on it. She performs dance moves behind the screen, which starts going up slowly. She wore a custom-made black pointy corset by Trashy Lingerie and fishnets like the costume in the music video of "Open Your Heart". After dancing on the stairs, using a chair as a prop, Madonna descends and starts singing the song. Later Finch joins her again and they dance together till the song ends. This was followed by the performance of "Lucky Star" during which a disco ball spun above the stage; as Madonna and her dancers moved around it, the light from the ball flickered on them like a star. For "True Blue", Madonna came up on the stage wearing a blue, silk taffeta dress over her corset and a blue scarf hidden in her bosom. The stage had a similar blue setting like the original music video. Madonna is backed up by her singers who play her girlfriends. At the end of the song Madonna is asked to dance again by the dancer playing her man in the performance. During "Papa Don't Preach" Madonna wore a black leather jacket over her dress and walked around the stage while singing. The screen in the background showed portraits of Pope John Paul II and then-President of the U.S. Ronald Reagan, along with scenes of John Perry III's short film, The Nightmare, ending with the words "Safe Sex", as Madonna finished the song. She dedicated the song to the Pope, marking her first conflict with the Vatican, as Pope John Paul II urged Italian fans to boycott her concerts.

During "White Heat"—which featured dialogues from the 1949 James Cagney film of the same name—a video screen displayed a scene from the film, with Cagney saying the dialogue: "A copper ... a copper fellas". The video screen moves up and Madonna appears, wearing a lamé jacket and holding a plastic gun in her right hand. A large cut out of Cagney appears in the middle and Madonna finishes singing the song, while pointing the revolver towards her dancers and pretending to fire at them, as sounds of gunshots are heard. She followed it with "Causing a Commotion" which ended with Madonna pointing to her dancers and musicians across stage and uttering the line "He/She's got the moves baby" numerous times. For "The Look of Love" the spotlight was focused on her. The introductory music of the song started and Madonna roamed around the stage, pretending that she was lost. She wanted to portray her Who's That Girl film character Nikki, when she was lost in a similar sequence in the film. After she finished singing the song, Madonna pretended to walk forward by pushing through the air, as the conveyor belt took her backwards, ultimately taking her away from the stage. Then a red phone booth appears on the stage, in which Madonna's silhouette appears to be changing costume. She emerges from the booth wearing the Edna Everage inspired costume and starts singing "Dress You Up". Then she sang "Material Girl", while stretching her legs on stage and showing her underwear and followed by "Like a Virgin", during which she took off her outfit piece by piece, until she was standing in the same outfit from the beginning of the show, and ended the performance while flirting with a young male dancer who played her bridegroom.

A backdrop then started showing the newspaper reports on Madonna's 1985 Playboy nude picture release. The backdrop moves up as Madonna appears, wearing a loose-fitted black pant and top, with bejeweled glasses, for singing "Where's the Party". For "Into the Groove" Finch joins her on stage to dance alongside. Madonna then wore a pink bolero jacket which had the can of soup and the words "U" and "DANCE" flanking it. At the end she is joined by her backup singers and dancers. Together they take a bow to the audience and finish the performance. Next Madonna sang "La Isla Bonita" as a part of the encore, wearing the same red flamenco dress she had worn in the video. For "Who's That Girl", Madonna—flanked by Finch and a male dancer—strutted around the stage, asking the audience to join her on the chorus. Lastly, Madonna performed an energetic version of "Holiday", signaling the celebratory and wholesome nature of the song's theme. The song featured a new arrangement, with a guitar solo in the intermediate portion added by Leonard. She sang the final chorus twice, then asked the audience for a comb so that she could fix her hair and finished the performance, after taking a bow with her dancers to the audience.

== Critical reception ==
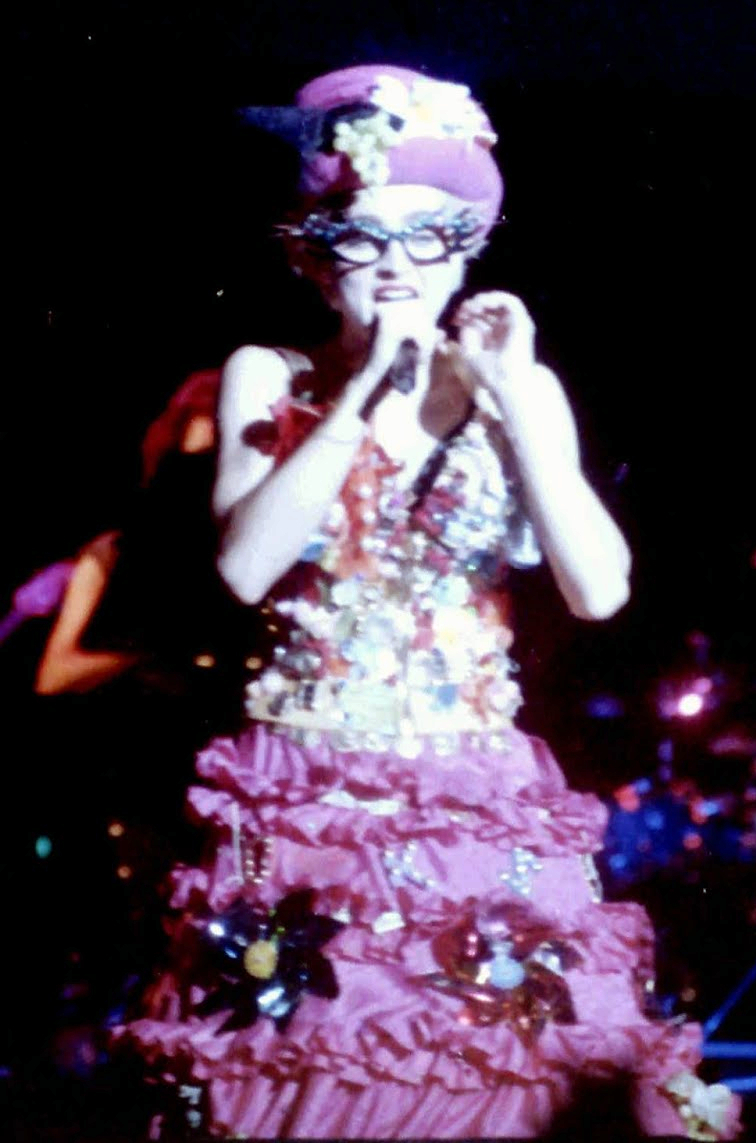
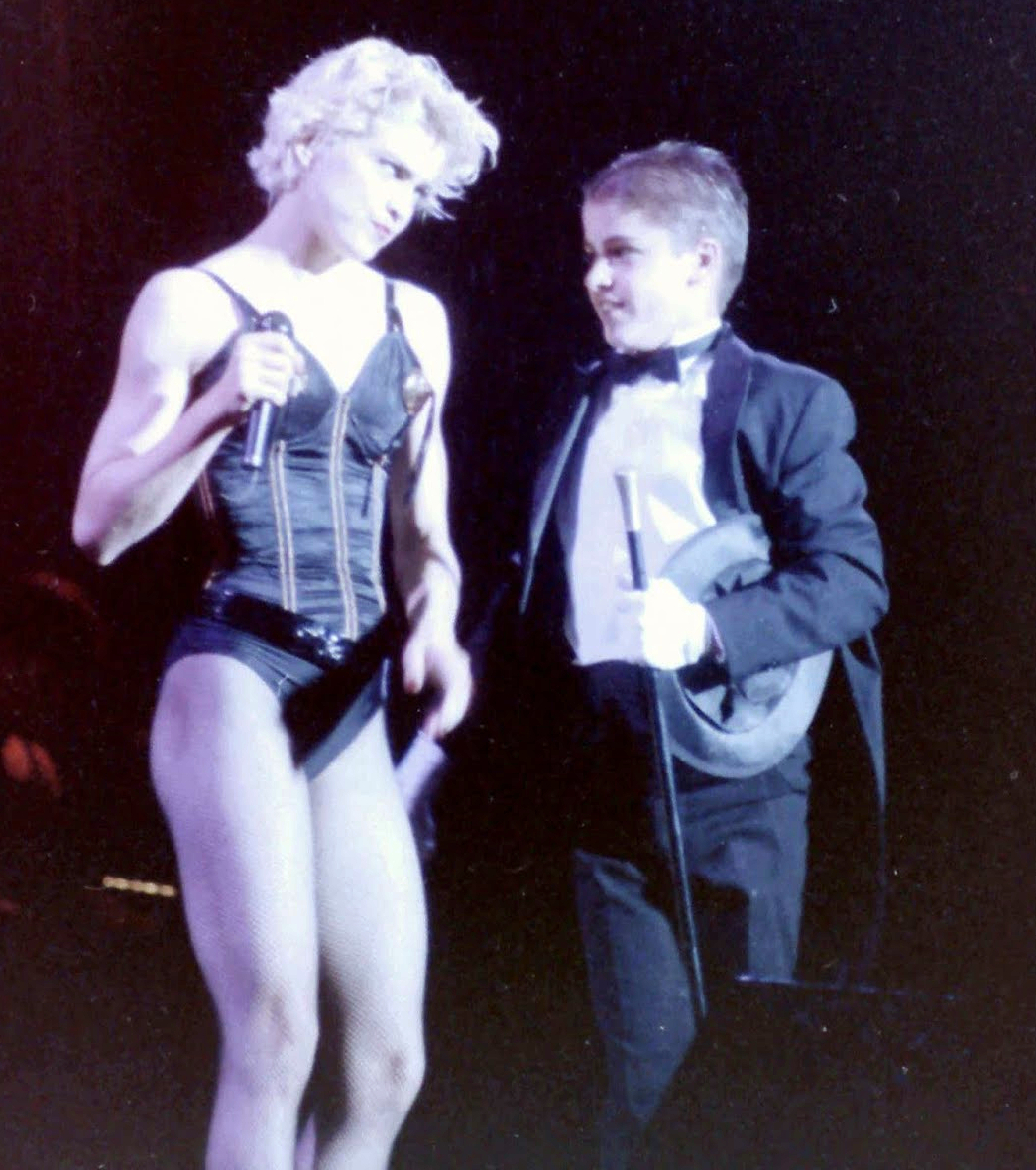
For the medley of "Material Girl" and "Dress You Up", Madonna wore an Edna Everage inspired costume (left), while "Like a Virgin" saw her being joined by 13-year-old dancer Christopher Finch (right).

The tour received rave reviews. Biographer Taraborrelli commented, "Madonna had more confidence in her stage presence, her music was showing a deeper maturity, her voice was fuller, and the show was expertly choreographed with complex numbers. J. D. Considine from The Baltimore Sun commented, "I've seen the Springsteen stadium tour, I've seen Dylan and the [Grateful] Dead, and I was at Live Aid. Out of all those shows, Madonna's is the only one I want to see again. You need a larger-than-life show if you want to come off in a stadium, and Madonna does. She's not that large physically, but she holds your attention." Ann Ayers, assistant entertainment editor of USA Today felt that the show was high on glitz and low on emotional quotient. "Madonna's going for a certain kind of show: a Broadway, show-biz, song-and-dance spectacle. In that context it's hard to make a connection with the audience, and I'd have to say that she didn't." Peter Goddard from Toronto Star reviewed the concert in CNE Stadium and said, "Madonna proved that she may be a lost girl in the roads of life, like her film, but she ain't lost when she is singing. Especially during songs like 'Papa Don't Preach', her vocal prowess was substantially notable." Scott A Zamost and Elizabeth Snead, writing for Chicago Tribune, felt that "For the most part, the premiere concert on Madonna's Who's That Girl tour was a success, an extravaganza of multiple videos, flashing lights and precision dancing. If the high-tech accoutrements and inferior sound system made it difficult to hear the singer, one hopes that will be refined as the tour continues across the United States. [...] As a dancer, Madonna is supreme on stage. Her trademark skip to a funky beat highlighted the constant acrobatics. One minute she was stage left, another minute stage right. She ran up a wide staircase center stage to party with her three back-up singers, then scooted down to the stage floor, swinging her hips, accompanied by other dancers."

Deborah Wilker from The Day commented that "Madonna's got an almost rabid energy about her, which she maintains for the duration of 90 minutes. In fact she rarely leaves the stage—preferring to change costumes in a phone booth instead. Boy can she change. One minute she's a 50's teenager in a party dress, next she's playing a speak-easy chanteuse. It's almost difficult to believe that a career as young as Madonna's could contain so much popular material that on stage the star can barely get to half of it." Don McCLeese from Chicago Sun-Times reviewed the performance at Soldier Field stadium said that "'Shine' seems like a dim possibility for her Soldier Field performance this month, because Madonna invariably takes the stage after dusk has turned to dark and brings back the sun again for the two hours that she played." In another review, McCleese commented: "[Madonna] proceeded to show Soldier Field a few moves that would gain Walter Payton some yardage, while putting a whole new twist on the term 'backfield in motion'. The girl really knows how to cause a commotion." Richard Harrington from The Washington Post felt that the tour "would have played better to a full house at the Capital Centre or Merriweather Post Pavilion. But to her credit, Madonna performed last night as if the house was full, and the show is splendid pop theater. Madonna has described it as 'Broadway in a stadium', and with her nonstop dancing, costume changes, mini-dramas and dynamic pacing, it is sort of a 'Liza With an M.'"

Jon Pareles from The New York Times reviewed the concert at Madison Square Garden in New York and felt that "For all its effort and professionalism, the concert wasn't exactly moving; Madonna had to ask the audience to get up and dance twice. But as shallow, kitschy, pop entertainment—no big messages, no revelations, familiar sounds and images, plenty of catchy tunes—the show was easy to enjoy. [...] The tunes stick to her limited vocal range and usually use short phrases—the better to keep her from running out of breath as she dances across the stage. And her band knocked the songs out with solid precision, recreating the gleaming sound of her records. On their rankings of Madonna's tours, VH1's Christopher Rosa and The Odyssey's Rocco Papa both placed Who's That Girl in the fourth position; according to the former, it includes "some of M’s most effervescent performing" and a "setlist that rivals any Madonna tour to date", while the latter deemed it "much more simple compared to what we're used to seeing from Madonna" and pointed out "a certain spark and joy captured during this show which has never been duplicated" and how the singer "proved her ability to command an audience". From The Advocate, Gina Vivinetto placed it on the eight position of her ranking. It came in at eleven on Billboard's 2024 ranking; Sal Cinquemani, wrote: "[Who's That Girl] hinted at what was to come on future tours in terms of spectacle and ambition. Though it was only her second tour, [it] would become the last of Madonna's shows to resemble a conventional pop-rock concert".

== Commercial response ==
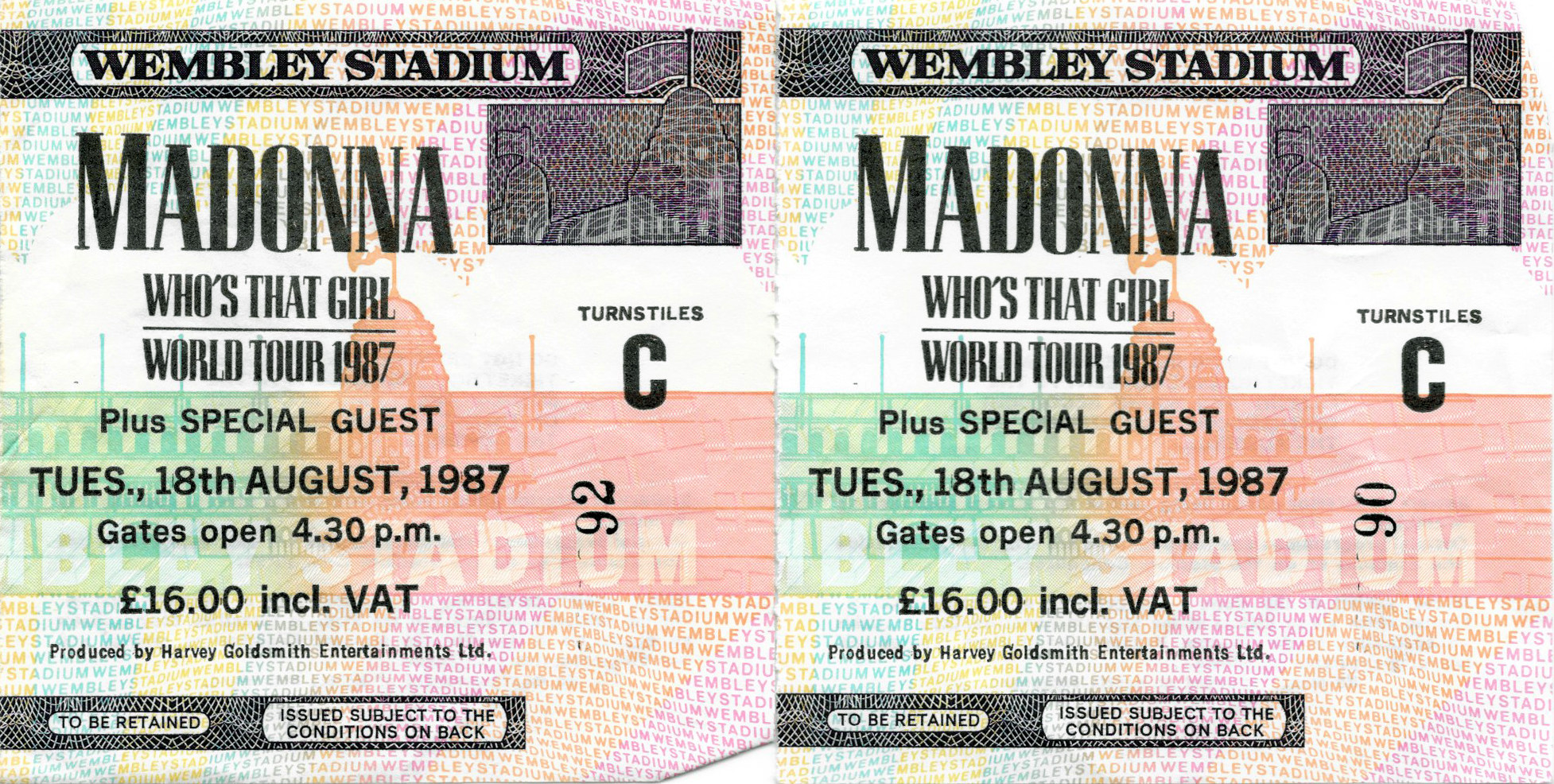
Tickets for one of the concerts at Wembley Stadium. Over 144,000 tickets sold out in 18 hours and 9 minutes.

After the tour was announced, the first two shows at Wembley Stadium in London sold-out at a then record-breaking time of 18 hours and 9 minutes for 144,000 tickets. Madonna's concert in Paris in front of 130,000 fans remains to this date, her biggest paid concert audience ever and largest crowd of any concert in French history. A concert was also planned in Basel, Switzerland for August 31, 1987, but negotiations between Madonna's management and local organizers failed due to the high fee of one million ($2.83 million in 2025 dollars) that Madonna's camp demanded. As a result, Nice, France was booked in the itinerary. But when a local mayor threatened to cancel the concert, citing crowd problems, Jacques Chirac, then Mayor of Paris, stepped in to overrule him. Her first-ever Italian concert in Turin, was presented by the Italian state broadcaster RaiUno and broadcast around the world. Just in Italy, the show was watched by around 14 million households. The show at Turin was watched by 65,000 fans and was a record there.

In Japan, a thousand troops had to restrain a crowd of 25,000 fans seeking to greet Madonna at the airport. When severe storms forced the cancellation of her first shows, despondent fans nearly rioted, and Madonna was confronted with out-of-control teenagers soaking themselves in the rain outside the stadium. Promoters had no choice but to refund U.S. $7 million to ticket-buyers. Madonna's Madison Square Garden show in New York City was an AIDS benefit with all the proceeds from the show going to American Foundation for AIDS Research (AmFAR). She dedicated her performance of "Live to Tell" to her late friend Martin Burgoyne, the designer of her 1983 "Burning Up" single cover sleeve. Upon completion, the tour was the second top female concert tour of 1987, behind Tina Turner's Break Every Rule Tour, earning in total of US$25 million according to Pollstar and playing in front of 1.5 million audience all over the world.

== Broadcasts and recordings ==
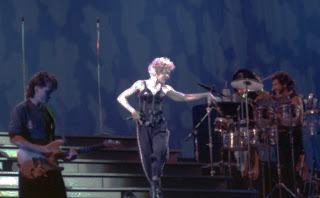
The stage as visible during the tour

The concert at Korakuen Stadium, Tokyo was broadcast on June 22, 1987, in Japan only. It was later released on VHS and LaserDisc as Who's That Girl: Live In Japan. It was the first television broadcast using Dolby Surround Sound and was promoted by Mitsubishi, as Madonna had previously starred in television commercials for their video recorders. On September 4, 1987, Madonna's concert special, Madonna in Concerto, filmed at the Comunale Stadium in Turin, Italy was broadcast live on TV in Italy (RAI), France (TF1), Germany (SAT1), Austria (ORF) and Spain (TVE). Other countries including Australia and The Netherlands broadcast this show in 1987. The concert was released commercially in 1988 as Ciao Italia: Live from Italy and was later available on LaserDisc and DVD.

The video contains the full Who's That Girl show, produced using footage from three different shows: Tokyo on June 22, 1987, Turin on September 4, 1987, and Florence on September 6, 1987. Heather Phares from Allmusic said: "A much simpler, less choreographed performance than her later extravaganzas like The Girlie Show World Tour, Ciao Italia is still entertaining in its own right, and will definitely please fans nostalgic for some old-school Madonna hits." Mark Knopher from the Los Angeles Daily News commented that "Ciao Italia shows the glitz and the glamor that made this tour so remarkable." It charted at the top of the Billboard music DVD chart on for six weeks and ranked at two on the "1988 Year-end Top Ranked Tapes". Ciao Italia also charted at number three on the Finnish DVD chart in 2009.

== Legacy ==
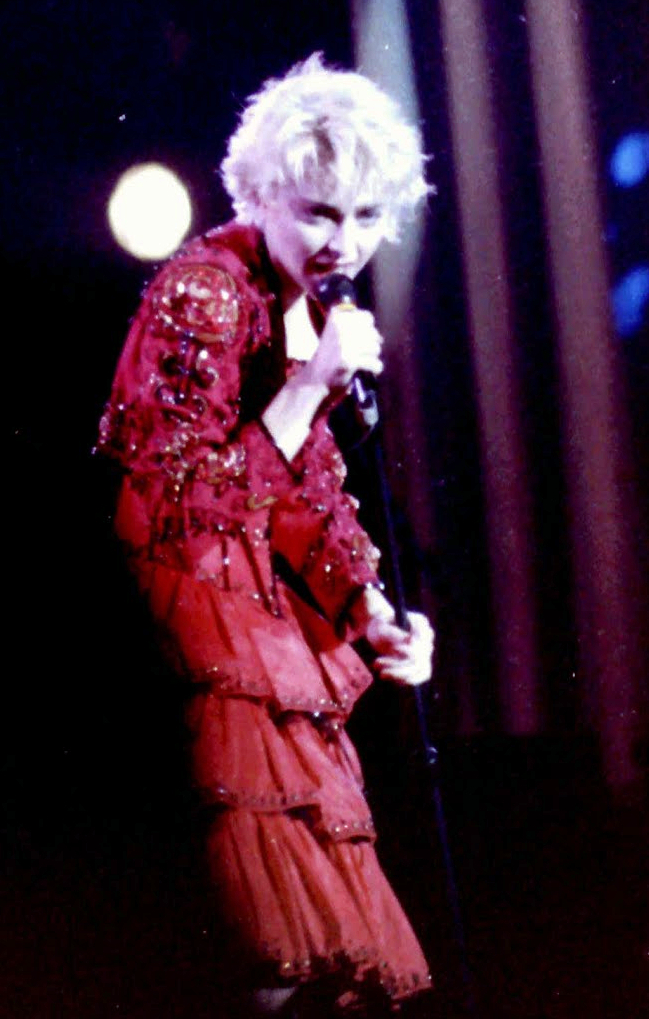
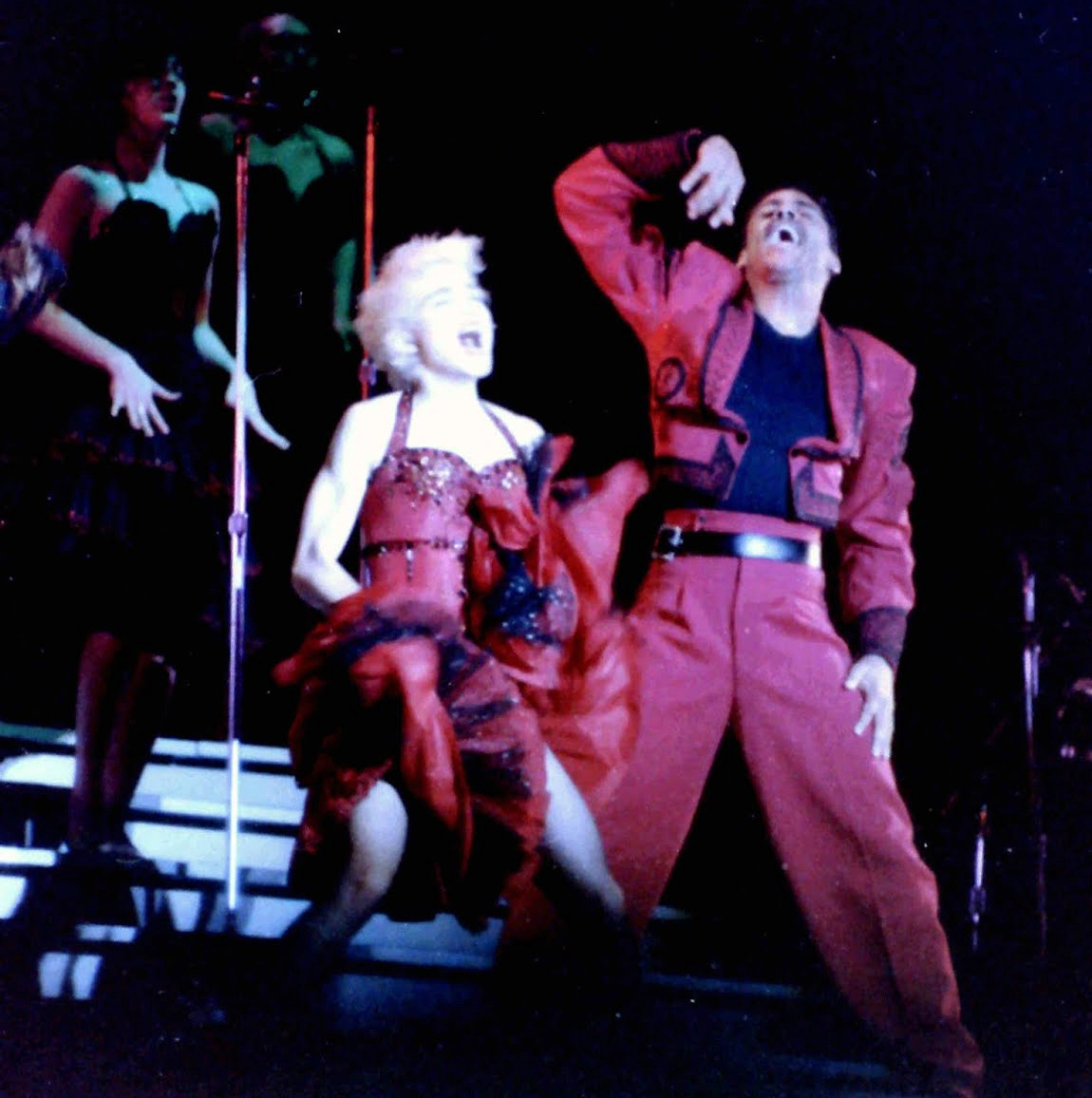
The encore of the concert found Madonna performing "La Isla Bonita" (left) and "Who's That Girl" (right).

According to Taraborrelli, "Many female artists behave like a diva for a period when they reach superstar status, and the 'Who's That Girl?' tour marked the beginning of Madonna's." For instance, she would not allow crew members to talk directly to her; they had to talk to her representatives, lest they distract her from the business at hand. She also forbade her dancers from speaking to her and her musicians were not permitted to even look at her unless they were onstage with her. Moreover, when coming on and off the stage, Madonna demanded that road managers hold sheets around her in order to shield her from the eyes of "those who couldn't help but stare". DeMann commented: "She has a way of demanding that compels you to give her your undivided attention", to which Taraborrelli felt that such behavior actually was an indication of how successful and strong Madonna was. "You don't behave like a bitch until you are that successful. The tour sure helped cement her star status", he commented.

The tour was also notable for giving rise to the term "new Madonna", a stronger and more intelligent sexual image of her former self which had given rise to the term Madonna wannabe. Considine felt that "the important thing Madonna did on the tour was to demonstrate how female sexuality can be a source of strength. Traditionally in pop culture, there are two roles that a woman can play—the good girl and the bad girl, and the bad girl is never taken seriously. But Madonna shows up the trappings of a bad girl, and demanded to be taken up seriously because she just doesn't roll over. I got more sense of the strength and power that was under her image all along." Another important fact noted in the tour by scholars is the extensive use of multimedia technique to its maximum potential. Says Mark Bego, author of Madonna: Blonde Ambition, that "Madonna transformed the concept of a concert tour being focused on the songs. She turned her Who's That Girl? tour into a ubiquitous multimedia blitz technique by including songs, dancing, choreography, videos, big screens, backdrops—not to mention the subtle preaching and messages—that made singing a secondary quality for concert goers. Evident from the people that thronged to see the tour, they were there for the spectacle—and not see Madonna standing in front of the microphone and singing.

There had never before been a more imaginative or forceful showcase for the feminine sensibility in pop. Madonna is simply the first female entertainer who has ever starred in a show of this scope

— Mikal Gilmore on the tour.

Publications also noted the fanaticism Madonna suscited in various of the countries she visited, especially Japan and the United Kingdom which prompted South China Morning Post to say it "demonstrates the unique position that she commands in the world of pop music". The merchandise also "enjoyed rocketing sales". While in Italy, Madonna met some of her relatives from Pacentro, the village in which her grandfather and grandmother, Gaetano and Michelina Ciccone had been married. However, it was not the glorious home coming that she had expected; some of her relatives made it very clear that they were scandalized by her appearance and behavior. One good thing came from the visit, there were talks of making her an honorary citizen of the town. Ultimately, a statue of Madonna, wearing conical bra was erected in her name, at the center of the town.

== Set list ==
Set list and samples per Madonna's official website and the notes and track listing of Ciao Italia: Live from Italy.

1. "Open Your Heart"
2. "Lucky Star"
3. "True Blue"
4. "Papa Don't Preach"
5. "White Heat"
6. "Causing a Commotion"
7. "The Look of Love"
8. Medley: "Dress You Up" / "Material Girl" / "Like a Virgin" (Contains an excerpt from "I Can't Help Myself (Sugar Pie Honey Bunch)")
9. "Where's the Party"
10. "Live to Tell"
11. "Into the Groove"
12. "La Isla Bonita"
13. "Who's That Girl"
14. "Holiday"

== Tour dates ==
List of concerts
Date (1987)	City	Country	Venue	Opening act	Attendance	Revenue
June 14	Osaka	Japan	Osaka Stadium	Level 42	89,996 / 89,996	$888,773
June 15	Osaka	Japan	Osaka Stadium	Level 42	89,996 / 89,996	$888,773
June 21	Tokyo	Japan	Korakuen Stadium	Level 42	65,000 / 65,000	$780,123
June 22	Tokyo	Japan	Korakuen Stadium	Level 42	65,000 / 65,000	$780,123
June 27	Miami	United States	Miami Orange Bowl	Level 42	55,600 / 56,000	$1,005,260
June 29	Atlanta	United States	Omni Coliseum	Level 42	12,526 / 12,526	$250,520
July 2	Washington, D.C.	United States	Robert F. Kennedy Memorial Stadium	Level 42	32,378 / 38,594	$602,780
July 4	Toronto	Canada	CNE Stadium	Level 42	45,184 / 50,000	$829,184
July 6	Montreal	Canada	Montreal Forum	Level 42	32,985 / 32,985	$430,735
July 7	Montreal	Canada	Montreal Forum	Level 42	32,985 / 32,985	$430,735
July 9	Foxborough	United States	Sullivan Stadium	Level 42	48,384 / 48,384	$1,068,975
July 11	Philadelphia	United States	Veterans Stadium	Level 42	46,182 / 51,500	$969,815
July 13	New York City	United States	Madison Square Garden	Level 42	16,993 / 16,993	$688,225
July 15	Seattle	United States	Kingdome	Level 42	—N/a	—N/a
July 18	Anaheim	United States	Anaheim Stadium	Level 42	62,986 / 62,986	$1,417,185
July 20	Mountain View	United States	Shoreline Amphitheatre	Level 42	—N/a	—N/a
July 21	Mountain View	United States	Shoreline Amphitheatre	Level 42	—N/a	—N/a
July 24	Houston	United States	Astrodome	Level 42	39,472 / 40,000	$789,440
July 26	Irving	United States	Texas Stadium	Level 42	40,601 / 41,000	$812,020
July 29	Saint Paul	United States	St. Paul Civic Center	Level 42	—N/a	—N/a
July 31	Chicago	United States	Soldier Field	Level 42	47,407 / 47,407	$1,066,658
August 2	East Troy	United States	Alpine Valley Music Theatre	Level 42	21,988 / 21,988	$455,605
August 4	Richfield	United States	Richfield Coliseum	Level 42	34,228 / 34,228	$497,250
August 5	Richfield	United States	Richfield Coliseum	Level 42	34,228 / 34,228	$497,250
August 7	Pontiac	United States	Pontiac Silverdome	Level 42	41,017 / 44,556	$881,866
August 9	East Rutherford	United States	Giants Stadium	Level 42	51,000 / 51,000	$1,832,780
August 15	Leeds	England	Roundhay Park	Level 42	73,000 / 80,000	$490,210
August 18	London	England	Wembley Stadium	Level 42	216,000 / 216,000	$4,984,956
August 19	London	England	Wembley Stadium	Level 42	216,000 / 216,000	$4,984,956
August 20	London	England	Wembley Stadium	Level 42	216,000 / 216,000	$4,984,956
August 22	Frankfurt	West Germany	Waldstadion	Level 42	51,981 / 51,981	$2,177,515
August 25	Rotterdam	Netherlands	Feijenoord Stadion	Level 42	—N/a	—N/a
August 26	Rotterdam	Netherlands	Feijenoord Stadion	Level 42	—N/a	—N/a
August 29	Paris	France	Parc de Sceaux	Level 42	131,100 / 131,100	$1,989,234
August 31	Nice	France	Stade Charles-Ehrmann	Level 42	—N/a	—N/a
September 4	Turin	Italy	Stadio Comunale	Level 42	63,127 / 63,127	$1,294,050
September 6	Florence	Italy	Stadio Artemio Franchi	Level 42	—N/a	—N/a
Total					1,317,663 / 1,346,595 (97%)	$26,795,382

=== Cancelled dates ===
Date (1987)	City	Country	Venue	Reason	Ref.
June 20	Tokyo	Japan	Korakuen Stadium	Heavy rain	

== Personnel ==
Adapted from the Who's That Girl World Tour 1987 program.

=== Band ===
- Madonna – creator, vocals
- Niki Haris - vocals
- Donna De Lory - vocals
- Debra Parson - vocals
- Patrick Leonard – keyboards
- Jai Winding – keyboards
- Jonathan Moffett – drums
- David Williams – guitar
- James Harrah – guitar, bass guitar
- Kerry Hatch – synth bass
- Luis Conte – percussion

=== Dancers and choreographers ===
- Shabba Doo – choreographer, dancer
- Angel Ferreira – dancer
- Chris Finch – dancer

=== Wardrobe and crew ===
- Marlene Stewart – designer
- Eric Barnett – tour manager
- Patrick Leonard - musical director
- Jeffrey Hornaday – tour director, staging
- Liz Rosenberg - publicity
- Melissa Crow - assistant to Madonna
- Michelle Johnson - assistant to Jeffrey Hornaday
- Christopher Ciccone - wardrobe
- Rob Saduski – wardrobe
- Debi Mazar – make-up, stylist
- Julie Chertow - masseuse
- Robert Parr - trainer
- Peter Chaplin - cook
- Mario Ciccone - props, ambiance
- Peter Morse – lights, strobe direction
- John Perry III - producer and director of "Papa Don't Preach" video segment
- John Coulter - tour book design

== See also ==
- List of highest-attended concerts
- List of highest-grossing concert tours by women

== Bibliography ==
- Bego, Mark (2000). Madonna: Blonde Ambition. Cooper Square Press. ISBN 0-8154-1051-4.
- Bordo, Susan R.; Heywood, Leslie (2004). Unbearable weight : feminism, Western culture, and the body. University of California Press. ISBN 0-520-24054-5.
- Clerk, Carol (2002). Madonnastyle. Omnibus Press. ISBN 0-7119-8874-9.
- Guilbert, Georges-Claude (2002). Madonna as postmodern myth. McFarland. ISBN 0-7864-1408-1.
- Kellner, Douglas (1995). Media Culture: Cultural Studies, Identity, and Politics Between the Modern and the Postmodern. Routledge. ISBN 0-415-10570-6.
- Layton, Lynne (2004). Who's That Girl? Who's That Boy?: Clinical Practice Meets Postmodern Gender Theory. Routledge. ISBN 0-88163-422-0.
- Martin, Mick; Porter, Marsha (2003). DVD and Video Guide 2004. Ballantine Books. ISBN 0345449940.
- Metz, Allen; Benson, Carol (1999). The Madonna Companion: Two Decades of Commentary. Music Sales Group. ISBN 0-8256-7194-9.
- Morton, Andrew (2002). Madonna. Macmillan Publishers. ISBN 0-312-98310-7.
- Parish, James Robert; Pitts, Michael R. (2003). Hollywood Songsters: Garland to O'Connor. Taylor & Francis. ISBN 0-415-94333-7.
- Rooksby, Rikky (2004). The Complete Guide to the Music of Madonna. Omnibus Press. ISBN 0-7119-9883-3.
- Taraborrelli, Randy J. (2002). Madonna: An Intimate Biography. Simon & Schuster. ISBN 978-1-4165-8346-2.
- Voller, Debbi (1999). Madonna: The Style Book. Omnibus Press. ISBN 0-7119-7511-6.
