= Who's That Girl (soundtrack) =

Who's That Girl: Original Motion Picture Soundtrack

Soundtrack album by Madonna / various artists
- Released: July 20, 1987
- Recorded: 1987
- Genres: Dance-pop; pop
- Length: 39:48
- Labels: Sire; Warner Bros.
- Producers: Madonna; Patrick Leonard; Stephen Bray; Jay King; Green Gartside; Denzil Foster; Thomas McElroy; David Agent; Stock Aitken Waterman; David Gamson; John Potoker; Hubert Eaves III

Madonna chronology
True Blue (1986)	Who's That Girl (1987)	You Can Dance (1987)

Singles from Who's That Girl
- 1. "Who's That Girl" Released: June 29, 1987; 2. "Causing a Commotion" Released: August 25, 1987; 3. "The Look of Love" Released: November 30, 1987

Who's That Girl is the first soundtrack album by American singer and songwriter Madonna. It was released on July 20, 1987, in the UK and on July 21, 1987, in the US by Sire Records to promote the film of the same name. It also contains songs by her label mates Scritti Politti, Duncan Faure, Club Nouveau, Coati Mundi, and Michael Davidson. The soundtrack is credited as a Madonna album, despite her only performing four of the nine tracks on the album. After the commercial success of the film Desperately Seeking Susan (1985), in which she co-starred, Madonna wanted to act in another comedy film titled Slammer, about a woman named Nikki Finn who was falsely accused of homicide. However, due to the critical and commercial failure of her adventure film Shanghai Surprise (1986), Warner Bros. was initially reluctant to greenlight the project but later agreed.

Madonna began working on the soundtrack in December 1986, and contacted Patrick Leonard and Stephen Bray, who had worked as producers on her third studio album True Blue (1986). She felt that an uptempo song and a downtempo song were needed for the album. Leonard composed the music for the uptempo song, with Madonna providing the melody and lyrics. The singer named the track "Who's That Girl" and, believing this to be a better title than Slammer, changed the name of the film to the same. Together, Madonna and Leonard also developed the downtempo ballad "The Look of Love". Two more songs were composed for the film with Bray, the first being the dance track "Causing a Commotion", and the other being "Can't Stop", a track inspired by Sixties Motown and the group Martha and the Vandellas.

After its release, the Who's That Girl soundtrack received a mostly negative response from critics. Some reviews described the album as plain and incomplete, although the title track and "The Look of Love" were praised as its highlights. The soundtrack was a commercial success, reaching the top ten of the album charts of the United States, Austria, Canada, France, New Zealand, Sweden, and the United Kingdom, while topping the charts of Argentina, Germany, Italy, Netherlands, and the European Album chart. The album went on to sell six million copies worldwide.

Three of the Madonna tracks were released as singles. The title track became her sixth number-one single on the Billboard Hot 100, making her the first artist to accumulate six number one singles in the 1980s and the first female performer to get that many number ones as a solo act. "Causing a Commotion" was released as the second single and reached number two on the Hot 100. "The Look of Love" was a European market only release, reaching the top ten in the United Kingdom. Another track, "Turn It Up," was a promotional release in the United States, reaching number 15 on the dance charts. Who's That Girl received a further promotion from the successful Who's That Girl World Tour.

== Background ==
The 1985 comedy film Desperately Seeking Susan, in which Madonna co-starred, was a commercial success, prompting her to take further interest in acting. For her next screen project, she picked another comedy film initially titled Slammer, but later named Who's That Girl. Madonna played the character of Nikki Finn, a young woman accused of homicide who insisted that she was innocent. Released on parole, she was determined to clear her name. Along with a character named Loudon Trott (played by Griffin Dunne), she gets caught up in 36 hours of high adventure, culminating in a scene where Nikki interrupts a wedding to reveal the identity of the real murderer. Regarding the character Nikki, Madonna commented,

"I had a lot in common with Nikki. She's courageous and sweet and funny and misjudged. But she clears her name in the end, and that's always good to do. I'm continuously doing that with the public. I liked Nikki's tough side and her sweet side. The toughness is only a mask for the vulnerability she feels."

However, in the light of the bad publicity surrounding Madonna and her then-husband Sean Penn, coupled with the fact that their comedy film Shanghai Surprise had failed commercially, she had to fight hard to persuade Warner Bros. to greenlight the project. She also wanted her close friend James Foley to direct the film, proclaiming him to be a "genius". Foley had previously directed the music videos of her songs "Live to Tell", "Papa Don't Preach" and "True Blue".

== Development ==
"I had some very specific ideas in mind, music that would stand on its own as well as support and enhance what was happening on screen, and the only way to make that a reality was to have a hand in writing the tunes myself... [The] songs aren't necessarily about Nikki or written to be sung by someone like her, but there's a spirit to this music that captures both what the film and the character are about, I think."

— Madonna talking about the music of the film.

Having some specific ideas in her mind about the music of the film, Madonna contacted Patrick Leonard and Stephen Bray, who had helped to write and produce her third studio album True Blue in 1986. Madonna explained to them that she needed an uptempo song and a downtempo song. Madonna came to the recording studio one Thursday, and Leonard handed her a cassette of a recording of the chorus, which he had just finished working on. Madonna went to the backroom and completed the melody and the lyrics of the song, while Leonard worked on the other parts of it. After finishing the lyrics, Madonna decided to name the song "Who's That Girl", and changed the title of Slammer to the same, considering it to be a better name. In Fred Bronson's book The Billboard Book of Number 1 Hits, Leonard explained that the song was recorded in one day with Madonna recording her vocals only once. Additional guitar and percussion tracks were added later.

The downtempo song was developed on the following day, with Madonna writing the lyrics and Leonard composing the melody. Named "The Look of Love", the song contains the line "Nowhere to run, no place to hide. From the look of love, from the eyes of pride". Madonna was inspired by the look that actor James Stewart gave actress Grace Kelly in the 1954 film Rear Window. Madonna said: "I can't describe it, but that is the way I want someone to look at me when he loves me. It's the purest look of love and adoration. Like surrender. It's devastating." After "The Look of Love", Madonna went on to develop two further songs with Bray as the producer. The first was called "Causing a Commotion", and was inspired by Penn and the couple's often tumultuous relationship. Madonna felt that her marriage to Penn was on the verge of breaking up, due to Penn's abusive and violent nature. In a Rolling Stone article dated September 10, 1987, Madonna spoke about Penn's impact on her life and the song: "I don't like violence. I never condone hitting anyone, and I never thought that any violence should have taken place. But on the other hand, I understood Sean's anger, and believe me, I have wanted to hit him many times. I never would you know, because I realize that it would just make things worse. [...] I felt like he was 'Causing a Commotion' to purposefully distract me. I wrote this song and vented my frustration in it."

== Composition ==
"Who's That Girl"
A sample to Madonna's "Who's That Girl", where the lyrics for the chorus include Spanish words.

The title track is composed in Madonna's typical style—mixing a drum machine, bubbling bass synth line, and the sound of stringed instruments. According to Rikky Rooksby, author of The Complete Guide to the Music of Madonna, the three parts of the song, namely the bridge, where Madonna sings "what can help me now", the chorus and the verse flow together in a coherent manner, with the chorus incorporating a haunting effect. The song epitomized Madonna's interest in Hispanic culture that continued after the release of her 1987 single "La Isla Bonita". Leonard and Madonna had added Spanish phrases in the chorus, over the trumpets of the second verse, and also in the added instrumental break in the middle. "Who's That Girl" also makes use of the sonic effect brought about by the combination of multiple vocal lines, which had been previously used by groups like The Beach Boys in their singles "God Only Knows" (1966) and "I Get Around" (1964) as well as R.E.M.'s singles "Fall on Me" (1986) and "Near Wild Heaven" (1991). "Who's That Girl" employs this effect on the last chorus where three or four different vocal hooks are intertwined.

The second track "Causing a Commotion" has a danceable, up-tempo groove. The musical arrangement consists of a number of hooks interpolating with each other. It begins with the chorus, where Madonna sings the line "I've got the moves baby, You've got the motions, If we got together we be causing a commotion." The verses are accompanied by a four-note descending bassline and interjecting staccato chords. The lyrics make reference to Madonna's 1985 single "Into the Groove" and have three parts to the vocal harmony. According to the sheet music published at Musicnotes.com by Walt Disney Music Company, the song is set in the time signature of common time with a tempo of 192 beats per minute. It is composed in the key of B♭ major with Madonna's voice spanning from the high-note of C_{3} to B_{5}. The song has a basic sequence of B♭–Fm7–B♭–F_{9}–B♭_{6} as its chord progression.

"The Look of Love" starts off with a low bass synth line and a slow backing track. It is followed by the sound of percussion and a high register note, contrasting with the bassline. The song continues in this way until the last verse, which is backed by the sound of an acoustic guitar. A two-part vocal is found in the line "Nowhere to run, no place to hide". Rooksby felt that Madonna's voice sounded "expressive" when she sings the line "From the look of love" and utters the word "look" over the D minor chord present underneath. The word is sung in a higher note of the musical scale, thus giving an impression of the suspension like the quality of the minor ninth chord, dissociating it from the harmony of the other notes. The song is set in the time signature of common time, with a moderate tempo of 80 beats per minute. It is composed in the key of D minor, with Madonna's voice spanning the notes C_{5} to B♭_{3}. "The Look of Love" has a basic sequence of C–Dm–Fm–B as its chord progression.

"Can't Stop" has a high pitched keyboard sound embedded in between the sound of a drum machine and clarinet. The lyrics essentially refer to the idea that "I want my man and I am going to get him whatever". Rooksby noticed that the instrumental break in the song repeats the chorus, with a synth line added on the top. He felt that "Can't Stop", at 4:45 length, was a good example of the division of Madonna's songs between dance music—where the length is important—and the requirement of classic pop songs, which can vary from two minutes to four minutes. J. Randy Taraborrelli, in his book Madonna: An Intimate Biography, described Faure's song "24 Hours" as a slow track that fails to build up momentum. Joe Brown from The Washington Post described Davidson's "Turn it Up" as consisting of a slow background synth, that transforms into a rapidly progressing beat, with Davidson's singing reminiscent of the Beastie Boys.

== Promotion ==
=== Tour ===
Madonna performed "Who's That Girl", "Causing a Commotion," and "The Look of Love" on her 1987 Who's That Girl World Tour. It was her second concert tour, promoting True Blue and the soundtrack. Madonna trained herself physically with aerobics, jogging and weight-lifting, to cope with the choreography and the dance routines. For the costumes, she collaborated with designer Marlene Stewart, expanding on the idea of bringing her music video characters to life on stage. The stage was huge, with four video screens, multimedia projectors and a flight of stairs in the middle. Leonard became the music director and encouraged Madonna to go with the idea of rearranging her older songs and presenting them in a new format.

The show consisted of seven costume changes, with song-and-dance routines with an encore consisting of the title song "Who's That Girl" and "Holiday". The tour also addressed social causes like AIDS, during "Papa Don't Preach". Who's That Girl tour was critically appreciated and was a commercial success, grossing a total of US $25 million, with Madonna playing in front of 1.5 million people over the course of the tour. According to Pollstar, it was the second top female concert tour of 1987, behind Tina Turner's Break Every Rule Tour.

=== Singles ===
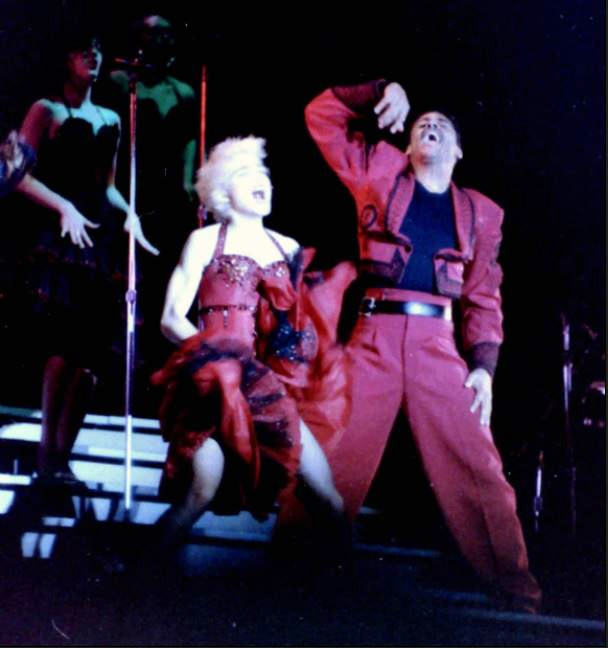
Madonna performing the soundtrack's title track during the Who's That Girl World Tour

"Who's That Girl" was released as the lead single from the soundtrack, on June 30, 1987. A latin pop influenced song, it became Madonna's sixth single to top the Billboard Hot 100 chart, making her the first artist to accumulate six number-one singles in the 1980s, and the first female performer to get that many number-ones as a solo act. It also reached the top the charts in United Kingdom, Italy, Canada, Netherlands, Ireland and Belgium. In the music video Madonna did not portray her film character Nikki Finn, instead she continued with her Hispanic look from the "La Isla Bonita" music video. This time she appeared dressed boyishly in a wide-brimmed Spanish hat and bolero jacket—a combination which would later become a fashion trend. "Who's That Girl" was nominated for "Best Song From A Motion Picture" at the 1988 Grammy Awards and "Best Original Song" at the 1988 Golden Globe Awards.

The album's second single, "Causing a Commotion", was released on August 25, 1987. It was criticized by music reviewers for being a sub-standard Madonna single, but enjoyed commercial success, reaching the top ten in New Zealand, Switzerland and the United Kingdom. In the United States, the single quickly climbed up the chart, ultimately peaking at number two in the week of October 24, 1987, the same week Michael Jackson's "Bad" advanced to the pole position. It remained in second position for three weeks, before descending from the chart. "Causing a Commotion" reached the top of the Hot Dance Club Play chart.

The third song released from the album was the European single, "The Look of Love". In the United Kingdom, "The Look of Love" was released on December 12, 1987, and entered the UK Singles Chart at number 15. The next week, it reached a peak of nine on the chart, her first single to miss the top five since "Lucky Star" (1984). "Turn It Up" was released as a single prior to its inclusion in the album in 1987. Described by Joe Brown of The Washington Post as "gratingly banal" and its singer as "one of Madonna's photogenic protegés", the song was a success on the Dance Club charts of Billboard, peaking at number 15.

== Critical reception ==
Professional ratings
Review scores
Source	Rating
AllMusic	2/5 stars
Robert Christgau	C−
Entertainment Weekly	D
MusicHound Rock	1/5 stars
Rolling Stone	2/5 stars
The Rolling Stone Album Guide	2/5 stars
The Virgin Encyclopedia of Nineties Music	2/5 stars

The soundtrack album was not well received by music critics, some of whom went on comment that the title track is the record's highlight. MusicHound's rock guide called it an "embarrassment" to an "ambitious artist". Jim Farber from Entertainment Weekly gave a negative review, though Noah Robischon from the same magazine complimented the title track, saying that Madonna had "pushed synergy over the borderline." Bill Lamb from About.com said that the songs were not among Madonna's best music. Taraborrelli commented that "the soundtrack was once again the reminder of Madonna's power and status as one of the most important singers of the 80s, because it was only her songs which gained prominence, albeit not being her best, though 'The Look of Love' is an exotic ballad." Author Mary Cross, in her biography Madonna: A Biography said that "the soundtrack slips up because of the film." Allen Metz and Carol Benson, authors of The Madonna Companion: Two Decades of Commentary, said that "Who's That Girl has done what it was released for, put money in Warner's pockets, but [adds] nothing in Madonna's catalogue". Stephen Thomas Erlewine noted in his review for Allmusic that "In the strictest sense [the record] isn't a Madonna album — it's a soundtrack album", adding that it features "competent but uninspiring dance-pop by [various artists]". David Denby from New York magazine commented that "there's nothing absolutely wrong with the soundtrack. But it's just that it has the misfortune of being associated with such an unfortunate movie, that the album actually does not hold up to you well." He added that "The Look of Love" was a hidden gem in Madonna's catalogue. Don Shewey from Rolling Stone commented that "although essentially a Madonna album, the soundtrack does not boast a truly memorable song, rather there is the inclusion of the failed Warner artist songs, like the Coati Mundi song 'El Coco Loco' and Duncan Faure's uncannily Beatles-esque '24 Hours'. For most buyers though this album is the new Madonna album."

Robert Christgau gave the album a (C−) and said "From Scritti Politti and Coati Mundi you expect trickier spin, but they're outsiders, and outsiders times soundtrack equals contract work. For her own movie, though, the decade's purest pop icon should do better than sloppy seconds. Or neat seconds—worse still." Ed Blank from Pittsburgh Press commented: "It feels like the sole purpose to create the soundtrack was to show it in the film." Jay Boyar from Orlando Sentinel praised the songs on the soundtrack, claiming that "Madonna brings forth a heart-breaking warmth in 'The Look of Love' and a club stomping feel with 'Causing a Commotion'. With the movie's fate being sealed, luckily for her Madonna can sing." Gyan Singh from The Miami Herald, while reviewing the film, said that the "Only solace of the movie is the soundtrack, the songs—especially those by Madonna—are actually good." Don McLeese from Chicago Sun-Times, while reviewing Madonna's Who's That Girl World Tour, said that "the soundtrack's songs sound good live". Larry Geller from The Advocate gave a positive review, saying that "Who's That Girl will be the soundtrack album of the summer." Stephen Holden from The New York Times gave an equally positive review, saying that the "soundtrack album is full of engaging pop fluff. One of the hottest singles of the year, Madonna's bilingual title song has the buoyant bounce of an acrobat doing somersaults on a trampoline. 'The Look of Love' is as memorable a ballad as [Madonna's 1986 single] 'Live to Tell', and '24 Hours', sung by Duncan Faure, skillfully fuses Beatles-styled vocals with 80's synthesizer-pop underpinnings." Daniel Brogan from Chicago Tribune said that "since this soundtrack isn't really a Madonna album, this is no surprise that it appears as incomplete."

== Commercial performance ==
After its release, the album debuted on the Billboard 200 at number forty-six on August 15, 1987, the same week that the title song "Who's That Girl" reached the top of the Billboard Hot 100. In the week ending September 12, 1987, the record reached its peak position at number seven. It remained on the chart for twenty-eight weeks, and was certified platinum by the Recording Industry Association of America (RIAA) for shipments of one million copies across the United States. In Canada, the album debuted at eighty-five on the RPM Albums Chart, on August 1, 1987. After seven weeks, the soundtrack climbed to its peak of four on the chart. The soundtrack was placed at position thirty-seven, on the RPM Top 100 Albums for 1987 chart and was present on the chart for thirty weeks.

In the United Kingdom, the album debuted and peaked at number four on the UK Albums Chart on August 1, 1987, becoming the highest debut of the week. It fell out one place the next week, where it stayed for other three weeks. Who's That Girl was present on the chart for twenty-five weeks and ended as the most popular original soundtrack album of 1987 in the country. The soundtrack was certified platinum by the British Phonographic Industry (BPI) for shipments of 300,000 copies across the United Kingdom. The album was less successful in Australia, where it debuted and peaked at number twenty-four. It entered the New Zealand Album chart at twelve on September 6, 1987. After two weeks, the album reached its peak at number six. In Austria, Who's That Girl became the best selling debut of the week, charting at number seven, on August 15, 1987, ultimately reaching number five. By August 1, 1987 Who's That Girl sold 140,000 albums and 65,000 singles in Italy in few weeks. In Spain, the soundtrack was released in August and reached sales of 57,049 units by November of the same year. It was later certified with platinum from PROMUSICAE for shipments of 100,000 copies. In Germany, Who's That Girl debuted at the top of the charts, remaining there for two weeks and earning a gold certification from BVMI. The album also reached the top of the charts on the European Top 100 Albums chart. Who's That Girl also reached the top-ten of the charts in France, Japan, Netherlands, Norway, Spain, Sweden and Switzerland.

== Recognition ==
Cash Box editor Kerry Day ranked Who's That Girl as the second-best album of 1987. In the Encyclopedia of World Biography (1998), authors explained that in this era, unlike the movie, both the soundtrack and its accompanied tour achieved commercial success. In 1989, Orlando Sentinel discussed successful movie soundtracks from 1930s to that point, where Who's That Girl was included among the examples, highlighting Madonna's participation of four singles. In a report from British Phonographic Industry, according to Nigle Hunter from Billboard, the release was called an "easy winner as the most popular original soundtrack album in 1987" on pair with Dirty Dancing. Hunter lumped both records among the "new trend for soundtrack albums of mixing new, specially recorded material with older hits".

== Track listing ==
Who's That Girl track listing
No.	Title	Writer(s)	Producer(s)	Length
1.	"Who's That Girl" (performed by Madonna)	Madonna; Patrick Leonard	Madonna; Leonard	3:58
2.	"Causing a Commotion" (performed by Madonna)	Madonna; Stephen Bray	Madonna; Bray	4:20
3.	"The Look of Love" (performed by Madonna)	Madonna; Leonard	Madonna; Leonard	4:03
4.	"24 Hours" (performed by Duncan Faure)	Mary Kessler; Joey Wilson	Bray	3:38
5.	"Step by Step" (performed by Club Nouveau)	Jay King; Denzil Foster; Thomas McElroy; David Agent	King; Foster; McElroy; Agent	4:43
6.	"Turn It Up" (performed by Michael Davidson)	Davidson; Frederic Mercier	Stock, Aitken & Waterman	3:56
7.	"Best Thing Ever" (performed by Scritti Politti)	Green Gartside; David Gamson	Gartside; Gamson; John "Tokes" Potoker	3:51
8.	"Can't Stop" (performed by Madonna)	Madonna; Bray	Madonna; Bray	4:45
9.	"El Coco Loco (So So Bad)" (performed by Coati Mundi)	Coati Mundi Hernandez	Hubert Eaves III	6:22
Total length:				39:48

== Personnel ==
- Madonna – lyrics, vocals, producer, background vocals
- Duncan Faure – vocals
- Club Nouveau – vocals
- Michael Davidson – vocals
- Scritti Politti – vocals
- Coati Mundi – vocals
- Patrick Leonard – lyricist, producer
- Stephen Bray – lyricist, producer
- Michael Barbiero – additional production, audio mixing
- Steve Thompson – additional production, audio mixing
- Shep Pettibone – additional production, audio mixing
- Junior Vasquez – mixing engineer, audio editing
- David Agent – producer, mixing
- Hubert Eaves III – producer, guitars
- Denzil Foster – lyricist
- David Gamson – sound trigger
- Green Gartside – vocals, lyricist
- Jay King – guitars
- Stock, Aitken & Waterman – lyrics, producer, background vocals
- Greg Ladanyi – inlay design, cover art, assistant engineer
- Michael Vail Blum – engineer

== Charts ==
=== Weekly charts ===
1987 weekly chart performance for Who's That Girl
Chart (1987)	Peak position
Argentine Albums (CAPIF)	1
Australian Albums (Kent Music Report)	24
Austrian Albums (Ö3 Austria)	5
Canada Top Albums/CDs (RPM)	4
Dutch Albums (Album Top 100)	1
European Top 100 Albums (Music & Media)	1
Finnish Albums (Suomen virallinen lista)	2
French Albums (IFOP)	2
German Albums (Offizielle Top 100)	1
Icelandic Albums (Tónlist)	5
Italian Albums (Musica e dischi)	1
Japanese Albums (Oricon)	5
Norwegian Albums (VG-lista)	2
New Zealand Albums (RMNZ)	6
Spanish Albums (AFYVE)	4
Swedish Albums (Sverigetopplistan)	4
Swiss Albums (Schweizer Hitparade)	4
UK Albums (OCC)	4
US Billboard 200	7

2018–2026 weekly chart performance for Who's That Girl
Chart (2018–2026)	Peak position
Croatian International Albums (HDU)	4
Hungarian Albums (MAHASZ)	36
Japanese Top Albums Sales (Billboard Japan)	91
UK Soundtrack Albums (Official Charts)	18

=== Monthly charts ===
Monthly chart performance for Who's That Girl
Chart (2019)	Peak position
Croatian International Vinyl Albums (HDU)	6

=== Year-end charts ===
1987 year-end chart performance for Who's That Girl
Chart (1987)	Position
Austrian Albums (Ö3 Austria)	26
Canadian Top Albums/CDs (RPM)	37
Dutch Albums (Album Top 100)	16
European Top 100 Albums (Music & Media)	18
French Albums (SNEP)	15
German Albums (Offizielle Top 100)	20
Norwegian Summer Period Albums (VG-lista)	8
Swiss Albums (Schweizer Hitparade)	29
UK Albums (Gallup)	41
US Soundtrack Albums (Billboard)	5
US Cash Box Albums	30

1988 year-end chart performance for Who's That Girl
Chart (1988)	Position
US Soundtrack Albums (Billboard)	8

== Certifications and sales ==
Certifications and sales for Who's That Girl
Region	Certification	Certified units/sales
Brazil	—	250,000
Canada	—	160,000
France (SNEP)	2× Platinum	600,000^{*}
Germany (BVMI)	Gold	250,000^{^}
Hong Kong (IFPI Hong Kong)	Platinum	20,000^{*}
Israel	—	15,000
Italy (AFI)	2× Platinum	450,000
Japan	—	111,350
Netherlands (NVPI)	Gold	50,000^{^}
New Zealand (RMNZ)	Gold	7,500^{^}
Spain (Promusicae)	Platinum	100,000^{^}
Switzerland (IFPI Switzerland)	Gold	25,000^{^}
United Kingdom (BPI)	Platinum	300,000^{^}
United States (RIAA)	Platinum	1,000,000^{^}
Summaries
Worldwide	—	6,000,000
^{*} Sales figures based on certification alone.^{^} Shipments figures based on certification alone.

== See also ==
- List of European number-one hits of 1987
- List of number-one hits of 1987 (Germany)

== Bibliography ==
- Bego, Mark (2000). Madonna: Blonde Ambition. Cooper Square Press. ISBN 0-8154-1051-4.
- Bourgoin, Suzanne Michele; Byers, Paula Kay (1998). Encyclopedia of World Biography. Gale. ISBN 0-7876-2221-4.
- Bronson, Fred (2003). The Billboard Book of Number 1 Hits. Billboard books. ISBN 0-8230-7677-6.
- Clerk, Carol (2002). Madonnastyle. Omnibus Press. ISBN 0-7119-8874-9.
- Cross, Mary (2007). Madonna: A Biography. Greenwood Publishing Group. ISBN 978-0-313-33811-3.
- Feldman, Christopher (2000). Billboard book of number 2 singles. Watson-Guptill. ISBN 0-8230-7695-4.
- Guilbert, Georges-Claude (2002). Madonna as postmodern myth. McFarland. ISBN 0-7864-1408-1.
- Metz, Allen; Benson, Carol (1999). The Madonna Companion: Two Decades of Commentary. Music Sales Group. ISBN 0-8256-7194-9.
- Michael, Mick St. (2004). Madonna 'talking': Madonna in Her Own Words. Omnibus Press. ISBN 1-84449-418-7.
- Morton, Andrew (2002). Madonna. Macmillan Publishers. ISBN 0-312-98310-7.
- Rooksby, Rikky (2004). The Complete Guide to the Music of Madonna. Omnibus Press. ISBN 0-7119-9883-3.
- Taraborrelli, Randy J. (2002). Madonna: An Intimate Biography. Simon & Schuster. ISBN 978-1-4165-8346-2.
- Voller, Debbi (1999). Madonna: The Style Book. Omnibus Press. ISBN 0-7119-7511-6.
