= Causing a Commotion =

1987 single by Madonna

Single by Madonna

from the album Who's That Girl
- B-side: "Jimmy Jimmy"
- Released: August 25, 1987
- Recorded: March–April 1987
- Studio: Larrabee Sound
- Genre: Dance-pop
- Length: 4:20
- Label: Sire; Warner Bros.
- Songwriters: Madonna; Stephen Bray
- Producers: Madonna; Stephen Bray

Madonna singles chronology
"Who's That Girl" (1987)	"Causing a Commotion" (1987)	"The Look of Love" (1987)

Licensed audio
- "Causing a Commotion" on YouTube

"Causing a Commotion" is a song by American singer Madonna from the soundtrack to the 1987 film Who's That Girl. Written and produced by Madonna and Stephen Bray, it is an uptempo dance-pop track with a prominent bassline and layered vocal harmonies. Its lyrics explore romantic tension and media scrutiny, drawing in part on Madonna's marriage to actor Sean Penn and her role in the film, while also referencing her 1985 single "Into the Groove". The song was released as the soundtrack's second single on August 25, 1987, following early airplay on American radio.

Reviews of the song ranged from positive to mixed; critics generally praised its production and dance appeal, though some regarded it as derivative of Madonna's earlier work and not among her strongest singles. Commercially, "Causing a Commotion" was successful, reaching number two on the Billboard Hot 100 and charting within the top ten in several countries, including the United Kingdom, Ireland, and the Netherlands. Madonna performed the song on her Who's That Girl (1987) and Blond Ambition (1990) concert tours, and it has since been covered by a select number of artists. In retrospective assessments, it has been regarded as an underrated entry in Madonna's catalogue and among her strongest work.

== Background and development ==
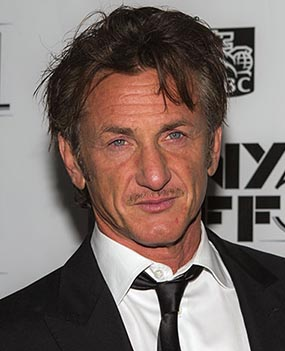
"Causing a Commotion" was inspired by Madonna's marriage to actor Sean Penn (pictured in 2013)

In October 1986, Madonna began filming her third feature film, Who's That Girl, a screwball comedy directed by James Foley—whom she had previously worked with on the music videos for "Live to Tell" and "Papa Don't Preach". The movie stars Madonna as Nikki Finn, a young woman accused of a murder she did not commit; after being released on parole, she sets out to clear her name. Alongside lawyer Loudon Trott (Griffin Dunne), she becomes caught up in "36 hours of high adventure", culminating in a scene where she interrupts a wedding to reveal the real culprit.

Work on the film's soundtrack began in March 1987. Madonna wanted to create songs that would "stand on [their] own as well as support and enhance what was happening on screen". To that end, she enlisted collaborators Patrick Leonard and Stephen Bray, the latter of whom also served as the film's musical director. Together, they wrote and produced four original songs for the soundtrack—the title track, "Causing a Commotion", "The Look of Love", and "Can't Stop". Madonna later noted that the songs "aren't about Nikki, or written to be sung by someone like her", but that they capture "the spirit" of both the film and the character.

"Causing a Commotion" was inspired by Madonna's "tumultuous" relationship with then-husband Sean Penn, whose temper and discomfort with media attention often conflicted with the demands of her public life, including several altercations with paparazzi that drew widespread attention. In a 1987 interview with Rolling Stone magazine, Madonna stated: "I don't like violence. I never condone hitting anyone, and I never thought that any violence should have taken place. But on the other hand, I understood [Sean's] anger [...] I felt like [he] was 'causing a commotion' to purposefully distract me. I wrote this song and vented my frustration in it".

The song plays over the animated opening sequence of Who's That Girl, which depicts the events leading to Nikki Finn's arrest. The sequence, inspired by Looney Tunes, features an animated Madonna emerging from the Warner Bros. logo and was developed by director James Foley and animator Ric Machin.

== Recording and composition ==
'Causing a Commotion'
20-second audio sample of "Causing a Commotion". The excerpt features the refrain, built around a pulsing bassline, layered harmonies, and its central hook.

Madonna and Stephen Bray wrote and produced "Causing a Commotion". It was recorded at Larrabee Sound Studios in Los Angeles between March and April 1987. Personnel included Bray on keyboard and guitar arrangements, audio engineers Taavi Mote and Michael Hutchinson, and assistants Elmer Flores and John Hegedes. The track was mixed by Steve Peck and mastered by Michael Verdick at Futuredisk Studios.

Musically, the song has been described as an upbeat dance-pop track. Its "catchy" refrain and prominent bass hook are supported by Bray's keyboard and guitar arrangements, which reflect the style of his band Breakfast Club, and Madonna's own "Into the Groove" (1985). Annie Zaleski of Consequence characterized it as electropop, while Erika Wolf of Albumism called it "somewhat bubblegum". Michael Freedberg of The Boston Phoenix likened its sound to a modern take on 1950s jump blues, and critics have compared its "pulsing" bassline to Michael Jackson's "Bad" (1987).

Built in common time with a funk-influenced tempo, the song opens with the refrain before moving into verses structured around a descending four-note bassline and sharp, staccato chords. Layered vocal harmonies and a rhythmic pattern echoing the word "commotion" complement Madonna's vocals, which one critic described as combining "alluring [and] unsettling" tones. As the song progresses, the rhythmic pulse becomes increasingly tight and driving, mirroring the central hook, "I've got the moves, baby, you got the motion / If we got together we'd be causing a commotion".

Despite its bright, upbeat sound, the lyrics refer to a turbulent relationship and tensions with the media, a contrast noted by critics such as Samuel R. Murrian, who linked the song to Madonna's difficult encounters with paparazzi. Wolf described the song as an "ode to being sexy and sassy and feeling yourself", adding that it captures the "rough edges" of Nikki Finn's character through lines such as "You met your match when you met me". Other writers interpreted the lyrics as portraying a relationship built on tension and attraction between opposites. References to "Into the Groove" appear in lines such as "It's how you play the game / So get into the groove" and "Quit wasting time / Make up your mind / And get into the groove", which Louis Virtel described as a "mantra" for the singer's fans.

== Release and remixes ==
"Causing a Commotion" was released as the soundtrack's second single on August 25, 1987. Prior to its release, it received airplay on several American CHR radio stations. The song was not released in France in order to avoid undermining the success of "Who's That Girl". As Madonna was on the Who's That Girl World Tour at the time of its release, no official music video was shot. Instead, a promotional clip was assembled from scenes from the film intercut with footage of the song's tour performance. Official remixes were produced by Shep Pettibone and co-edited with Junior Vasquez. These included the extended "Silver Screen Mix", a dub version featuring prominent riff-based arrangements, and the more house-oriented "Movie House Mix". Billboard praised Pettibone's remixes, while German magazine Audio highlighted the "Movie House Mix" as the most effective and energetic version.

In 1991, the "Silver Screen Mix" was included on the four-track extended play (EP) The Holiday Collection, alongside "Holiday" (1983), "True Blue" (1986), and "Who's That Girl". For the soundtrack's 35th anniversary, Rhino Records released Who's That Girl (Super Club Mix) in April 2022, a five-track EP featuring remixes of "Who's That Girl" and the "Movie House Mix" and "Silver Screen Mix" of "Causing a Commotion". Issued as part of Record Store Day, the release was limited to 7,500 copies and pressed on red twelve-inch vinyl.

== Critical reception ==
Upon release, "Causing a Commotion" received positive-to-mixed reviews from music critics. Daniel Brogan of the Chicago Tribune named it the best song on the soundtrack, while Jim Zebora of the Record Journal considered it "almost as good" as "Who's That Girl". A reviewer for Dutch newspaper Zierikzeesche Nieuwsbode felt that, although not markedly different from Madonna's previous work, it benefited from a more danceable rhythm, and Louis Weber later wrote that it, along with the title track, was the principal reason many listeners purchased the soundtrack. Christian Wright of Spin described the song as celebratory, while Tom Breihan of Stereogum called it a "sleek club jam", awarding it an 8 out of 10 rating. The production also drew praise. Oggie Ramos of the Manila Standard highlighted Bray's keyboard and guitar arrangements, while Vince Aletti of Rolling Stone, Robert Matthew-Walker, The Gavin Report, and Billboard commended Madonna's vocal performance, the song's rhythmic drive, bassline, and catchy hook. (Note: Attributed to Billboard, the Gavin Report, the Manila Standard, author Robert Matthew-Walker, and Rolling Stone.)

Other reviews were more critical. Rikky Rooksby deemed the song "perfectly acceptable", though inferior to "Who's That Girl", while Music & Media described it as "speedy [and] cheerful, though a bit clichéd". Entertainment Weekly praised its beat and refrain but found the verses sluggish, and Eric Henderson of Slant Magazine characterized it as "generic and diverting in equal measure". Joe Morgan of Gay Star News described it as a "classic 80s track" but with "not much to it", while Martin C. Strong and Brendon Griffin perceived a "strange monotony". More negative assessments dismissed the song as formulaic or among Madonna's weaker releases. John Rockwell of The New York Times argued that her vocal strengths were not fully evident, Al Walentis of the Reading Eagle found it forgettable, and Sean Piccoli of the Sun Herald ranked it among her worst songs. Comparisons to "Into the Groove" were frequent, with Daryl Easlea, John Milward, Piccoli, and Jude Rogers variously describing it as a retread, rewrite, or lesser imitation.

Billboard ranked "Causing a Commotion" among Madonna's best songs, noting that its "arresting" bassline and "sugary determination" make it "a delight, albeit a relatively slight one", while also calling its chart success a testament to her star power. Paul Grein argued that the song was overlooked by the Academy Awards, while Newsday, Consequence, and Parade described it as underrated and enduringly popular with fans. It has since appeared in rankings of Madonna's catalogue by outlets including 7x7, TheBacklot.com, Gay Star News, PinkNews, and USA Today. Andy Jones of Classic Pop and Garrett Mitchell of The Arizona Republic named it among Madonna's best soundtrack recordings, while Louis Virtel included it among the "10 Greatest Songs from Terrible Movies" and noted that fans often regard it as "the obscurest of [Madonna's] masterpiece singles". The song was also included in Bruce Pollock's Rock Song Index: The 7500 Most Important Songs for the Rock & Roll Era.

== Chart performance ==
In the United States, "Causing a Commotion" entered the Billboard Hot 100 at number 41 on September 12, 1987, marking Madonna's thirteenth consecutive highest debut of the week. It rose to number 11 by October 10, and entered the top ten the following week. On October 24, the song peaked at number two—her second single to reach that position after "Material Girl" (1985)—and remained there for three weeks. It spent eighteen weeks on the chart and ranked at number 46 on the year-end Hot 100. As of August 2024, Billboard ranked it as Madonna's 12th most successful Hot 100 entry, as well as her highest-charting single without an official music video.

The single also performed strongly across other Billboard charts, reaching number one on both the Dance Club Play and Dance Singles Sales charts, marking her sixth chart-topper on the former and the start of a string of consecutive dance hits. Despite this, it was omitted from Finally Enough Love: 50 Number Ones (2022), Madonna's third remix album that compiles her Dance Club Songs number ones. It additionally peaked at number 37 on Billboard's Adult Contemporary chart. In Canada, the song debuted at number 90 on the RPM Top 100 Singles chart dated September 19, 1987, eventually peaking at number two on November 7, where it was barred from the top position for two consecutive weeks by Billy Idol's "Mony Mony". It was later ranked as the 42nd most successful single of 1987 and was certified gold by the Canadian Recording Industry Association (CRIA) for sales of 50,000 copies. The single also reached the top five in Mexico.

"Causing a Commotion" achieved strong commercial success internationally. In the United Kingdom, it debuted at number seven on the UK Singles Chart and rose to a peak of number four, becoming Madonna's seventeenth consecutive top-ten single there. As of August 2008, it had sold over 229,000 copies in the country, and by 2015 ranked as her 32nd best-selling single there. It reached number one in Denmark, and peaked at number two in Belgium (Flanders), Ireland, and Iceland. In the Netherlands, it peaked at number three on both the Dutch Single Top 100 and the Dutch Top 40—behind "Bad" and Rick Astley's "Never Gonna Give You Up". The single reached number five on the European Hot 100 Singles, and charted within the top ten in countries such as Finland, Switzerland, Norway, Australia, and New Zealand.

== Live performances ==
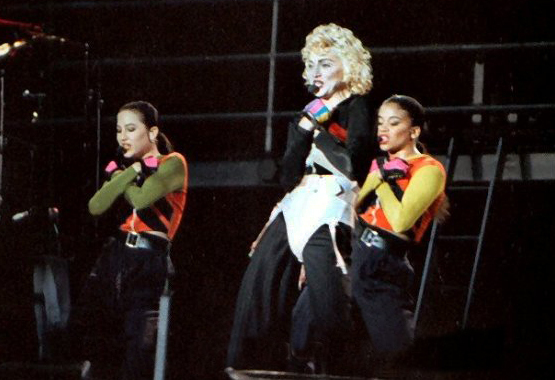
Madonna performing "Causing a Commotion" on the Blond Ambition World Tour (1990), with backing vocalists Donna De Lory (left) and Niki Haris (right)

Madonna performed "Causing a Commotion" on her Who's That Girl and Blond Ambition (1990) tours. On the first, it was performed prior to its commercial release in a more rock-oriented arrangement. The singer appeared in a gold lamé, gangster-style outfit and opened the number with self-aware remarks. Dancer Chris Finch performed a series of flips onstage while Madonna mimed air guitar. Toward the end, she removed parts of her costume while introducing the band. The Houston Chronicle named "Causing a Commotion" one of the concert's highlights, while Richard Harrington of The Washington Post felt it was less effective, noting that the public was still unfamiliar with it. The performance in Turin was broadcast via satellite during the MTV Video Music Awards, and later included on the home video release Ciao Italia: Live from Italy (1988).

The song's performance on the Blond Ambition World Tour saw Madonna dressed in a Jean-Paul Gaultier-designed outfit with a striped boxing blouse over her conical corset. She staged a mock fight with backing vocalists Niki Haris and Donna De Lory, who feigned dancing out of sync and tried to push her offstage, before she knocked them down and mockingly kicked them. The number received mixed reviews from critics. Ralph Kiesel for The Toledo Blade praised its energy, while Harrington criticized its "overly tight choreography", arguing it felt like "busywork" masking the song's shortcomings. Some also took issue with the staged violence. The performance from the tour's final show in Nice, France, was included on the 1991 LaserDisc release Blond Ambition World Tour Live.

Despite not being part of the official set list, Madonna sang a capella snippets of "Causing a Commotion" on some concerts of the Celebration Tour (2023―2024), such as Cologne, Boston, Toronto, Montreal, Pittsburgh, Seattle, and San Francisco.

== Covers and use in popular media ==
Taiwanese singer Su Rui incorporated "Causing a Commotion" into a medley on her English-language album I've Got the Music in Me (1989), while Indie pop duo TeamMate recorded a version for their 2013 extended play The Sequel. Vocalist Dani Buncher, a self-described "huge Madonna fan", said the group wanted to remain "very true to the original", while still adding their "own little spin" to it. Welsh musician Bright Light Bright Light also covered the track for his extended play Cinematography II: Back in the Habit (2017).

Some critics noted similarities between "Causing a Commotion" and Jessica Simpson's 2006 single "A Public Affair". Around 1986–1987, Madonna signed a $3 million endorsement deal with Mitsubishi Motors, which included a television commercial featuring her dancing to the track in stylized, music video–inspired settings. The song was featured in a 2016 episode of the eight season of RuPaul's Drag Race, where contestants Naomi Smalls and Acid Betty performed it in a lip sync challenge—won by Smalls.

== Formats and track listings ==
US 7-inch single

1. "Causing a Commotion" (Silver Screen Single Mix) – 4:00
2. "Jimmy Jimmy" – 3:54

US promotional 7-inch single'

1. "Causing a Commotion" (Silver Screen Single Mix) – 4:00
2. "Causing a Commotion" (Movie House Edit) – 4:12

US 12-inch maxi single

1. "Causing a Commotion" (Silver Screen Mix) – 6:33
2. "Causing a Commotion" (Dub) – 7:04
3. "Causing a Commotion" (Movie House Mix) – 9:40
4. "Jimmy Jimmy" – 3:54

UK 12-inch single

1. "Causing a Commotion" (Silver Screen Mix) – 6:33
2. "Causing a Commotion" (Movie House Mix) – 9:40
3. "Jimmy Jimmy" (Fade) – 3:39

1991 The Holiday Collection EP

1. "Holiday" – 6:09
2. "True Blue" – 4:17
3. "Who's That Girl" – 3:58
4. "Causing a Commotion" (Note: Listed as "Causin' a Commotion"; the version included is the "Silver Screen Single Mix".) – 4:06

1995 European maxi CD

1. "Causing a Commotion" (Dub) – 7:04
2. "Causing a Commotion" (Movie House Mix) – 9:40
3. "Jimmy Jimmy" – 3:5

2022 Record Store Day exclusive red 12-inch vinyl

1. A1 "Who's That Girl" (Extended version) – 6:29
2. A2 "Causing a Commotion" (Movie House Mix) – 9:40
3. B1 "Causing a Commotion" (Silver Screen Mix) – 6:33
4. B2 "Who's That Girl" (Dub version) – 5:05
5. B3 "Causing a Commotion" (Dub) – 7:04

2024 Digital single

1. "Causing a Commotion" (Silver Screen Single Mix) – 4:07
2. "Causing a Commotion" (Silver Screen Mix) – 6:40
3. "Causing a Commotion" (Dub) – 7:04
4. "Causing a Commotion" (Movie House Mix) – 9:46

== Credits and personnel ==
Credits adapted from the Who's That Girl soundtrack liner notes.

- Madonna – vocals, writer, producer
- Stephen Bray – writer, producer, audio mixing
- Shep Pettibone – audio mixing, additional production
- Junior Vasquez – mixing engineer, audio editing
- Steve Peck – mixing engineer
- Jeri Heiden – art direction
- Maura P. McLaughlin – design

== Charts ==
=== Weekly charts ===
1987 weekly chart performance for "Causing a Commotion"
Chart (1987)	Peak position
Australia (Kent Music Report)	7
Austria (Ö3 Austria Top 40)	14
Belgium (Ultratop 50 Flanders)	2
Canada Top Singles (RPM)	2
Denmark (IFPI)	1
European Hot 100 Singles (Music & Media)	5
Finland (Suomen virallinen lista)	5
Iceland (RÚV)	2
Ireland (IRMA)	2
Italy (Musica e dischi)	3
Netherlands (Dutch Top 40)	3
Netherlands (Single Top 100)	3
New Zealand (Recorded Music NZ)	6
Norway (VG-lista)	10
South Africa (Springbok Radio)	16
Sweden (Sverigetopplistan)	13
Switzerland (Schweizer Hitparade)	9
UK Singles (Official Charts)	4
US Billboard Hot 100	2
US Adult Contemporary (Billboard)	37
US Dance Club Songs (Billboard)	1
US Dance Singles Sales (Billboard)	1
West Germany (GfK)	14

2022–2024 weekly chart performance for "Causing a Commotion"
Chart (2022–2024)	Peak position
Hungary (MAHASZ) "Who's That Girl" / "Causing a Commotion"	3
UK Singles (OCC)	70
UK Singles Downloads Chart (OCC)	68

=== Year-end charts ===
1987 year-end chart performance for "Causing a Commotion"
Chart (1987)	Position
Australia (Kent Music Report)	65
Belgium (Ultratop 50 Flanders)	37
Canada Top Singles (RPM)	42
European Hot 100 Singles (Music & Media)	85
Netherlands (Dutch Top 40)	61
Netherlands (Single Top 100)	42
UK Singles (OCC)	72
US Billboard Hot 100	46
US Cash Box Top 100	29

== Literary sources ==
- Bego, Mark (2000). Madonna: Blonde Ambition. Cooper Square Press. ISBN 978-0-8154-1051-5.
- Bronson, Fred (2003). The Billboard Book of Number 1 Hits. Billboard Books. ISBN 978-0-8230-7677-2.
- Clerk, Carol (2012). Madonnastyle. Omnibus Press. ISBN 978-2-909828-89-3.
- Ciuk, Andrzej; Molek-Kozakowska, Katarzyna (2010). Exploring Space: Spatial Notions in Cultural, Literary and Language Studies; Volume 2: Space in Language Studies. Cambridge Scholars Publishing. ISBN 978-1-4438-2144-5.
- Easlea, Daryl (2012). Madonna: Blond Ambition. Backbeat Books. ISBN 978-1-61713-034-2.
- Feldman, Christopher (2000). Billboard book of number 2 singles. Watson-Guptill. ISBN 978-0-8230-7695-6.
- González, Lara; Pazkual, Igor; Viñuela, Eduardo (2018). Bitch She's Madonna: La Reina del Pop en la Cultura Contemporánea (in Spanish). Editorial Dos Bigotes. ISBN 978-84-948871-2-3.
- Gulick, Rebecca (1993). Madonna: Portrait of a Material Girl. Bison Books. ISBN 978-1-56138-236-1.
- Ichbiah, Daniel (2016). Les Chansons de Madonna (in French). CreateSpace. ISBN 978-1-5010-2479-5.
- Matthew-Walker, Robert (1991). Madonna: The Biography. Sidgwick & Jackson. ISBN 978-0-330-31482-4.
- Morton, Andrew (2001). Madonna. St. Martin's Press. ISBN 978-1-854-79888-6.
- Pollock, Bruce (2005). Rock Song Index: The 7500 Most Important Songs for the Rock & Roll Era. Routledge. ISBN 978-0-415-97073-0.
- Rachlin, Harvey (2020). Song and System: The Making of American Pop Music. Rowman & Littlefield. ISBN 978-1-5381-1213-7.
- Rettenmund, Matthew (1995). Encyclopedia Madonnica. St. Martin's Press. ISBN 978-0-312-11782-5.
- Rooksby, Rikky (2004). The Complete Guide to the Music of Madonna. Omnibus Press. ISBN 978-0-7119-9883-4.
- Madonna: The Rolling Stone Files. Hyperion Press. 1997. ISBN 978-0-7868-8154-3.
- Strong, Martin C.; Griffin, Brendon (2008). Lights, Camera, Soundtracks: The Ultimate Guide to Popular Music in the Movies. Canongate Books. ISBN 978-184767-003-8.
- Sullivan, Caroline (2014). Madonna: Her Story. Seven Oaks Publishing. ISBN 978-1-78177-179-2.
- Weber, Louis (2007). The Extraordinary Book of Lists: A Colossal Collection of Fascinating Facts and Intriguing Information. West Side Publishing. ISBN 978-1-4127-1420-4.
