= Ciao Italia: Live from Italy =

Video by Madonna
- Released: May 24, 1988
- Recorded: June 22, 1987; September 4, 1987; September 6, 1987
- Venues: Korakuen Stadium (Tokyo, Japan); Stadio Comunale (Turin and Florence, Italy)
- Genre: Live
- Length: 101 mins
- Labels: Warner Reprise Video; Sire
- Director: Egbert van Hees
- Producer: Riccardo Mario Corato

Madonna video chronology
Madonna Live: The Virgin Tour (1985)	Ciao Italia: Live from Italy (1988)	The Immaculate Collection (1990)

Ciao Italia: Live from Italy (credited as Madonna: Ciao, Italia! Live from Italy in the video sequence) is a video album by American singer-songwriter Madonna and was released by Warner Reprise Video and Sire Records on May 24, 1988. It contained footage from a previous TV special of the Who's That Girl World Tour, Madonna in Concerto, broadcast in Europe in 1987, filmed at the Stadio Comunale in Turin, Italy. The video release also contained footage from shows recorded in Florence, Italy and Tokyo, Japan, the latter having previously been released as a Japanese TV special and home video release, Who's That Girl: Live in Japan. The decision to release Ciao Italia was spurred by the fact that this previous release became a commercial success in Japan. A re-release of the video took place in 1999, when it was released in DVD format, with a stereo soundtrack containing the songs only.

The video received positive reviews from critics, who noted Madonna's showmanship and her skills as a performer. They also complimented the camera work in the video, for enhancing the visual aspects of the tour. Ciao Italia topped the Music Video sales chart of Billboard, and became the second best-selling music video cassette of 1988. It was certified platinum by the Recording Industry Association of America (RIAA) for shipment of 100,000 copies.

== Background ==
Madonna's 1987 Who's That Girl World Tour was a critical and commercial success, earning US $25 million and playing in front of an audience of 1.5 million. When the time came for the video release of the tour, Warner Bros. decided to release it only in Japan, where Madonna's previous video albums had not been released. This decision was also backed by the profit that the Who's That Girl World Tour had achieved from its Japanese leg. Named as Who's That Girl: Live in Japan, the video contained a live date from the tour, filmed at Korakuen Stadium in Tokyo, Japan on June 22, 1987. It was also aired as a television special in Japan only and was the first television broadcast there using Dolby Surround sound. The release was a commercial success, prompting Warner to release a different version of the tour video, for the rest of the world. Although the Japanese concert was released on VHS and LaserDisc, Warner Music Japan has never officially made it available on DVD.

The video was released on May 24, 1988, and contained video compilation of two different dates from the tour, Turin and from Florence, as well as clips from her concert in Tokyo, Japan. The video had an introduction, where Madonna was shown practicing with her troupe on the stage, rehearsing the songs and the dance moves. Madonna, who had gone through rigorous exercises and aerobics to prepare herself for the tour, demanded from director Egbert van Hees that the shape of her body be given prominence in the footage to be used for the video. She believed that her new shape and figure would make her appear highly attractive. In 1999, Warner Bros. re-released the video in DVD format, along with some of Madonna's other video albums. The music video appears in an aspect ratio of 1.33:1 (4:3) on the single-sided, single-layered DVD. The concert relied heavily on magenta tones; from the lighting to Madonna’s outfits. A stereo soundtrack accompanied the DVD release, where the songs were mixed without having a surround sound effect.

== Reception ==
=== Critical response ===
Professional ratings
Review scores
Source	Rating
AllMusic	3/5 stars
Entertainment Weekly	B+
Los Angeles Times	3/4 stars

Andrew Perala from Anchorage Daily News complimented the video, saying "If you have a secret fondness for pop singer Madonna, you would want to check out her Ciao Italia, the singer's concert film from Italy. You can be pleasantly surprised at how amazing she is." Heather Phares from Allmusic said: "Madonna's Ciao Italia: Live From Italy captures a performance from her 1988 world tour and features hits like 'Lucky Star', 'True Blue', 'La Isla Bonita', 'Like a Virgin', and 'Material Girl'. A much simpler, less choreographed performance than her later extravaganzas like The Girlie Show World Tour, Ciao Italia is still entertaining in its own right, and will definitely please fans nostalgic for some old-school Madonna hits." Dennis Hunt from Los Angeles Times gave a positive review, saying "A festive Italian stadium show featuring the Material Girl, who's turned into a first-rate entertainer, strutting and singing in flashy production-number renditions of her recent most Billboard topping songs, is indeed a delight. The video captures the enormity of Madonna as a performer, and her theatrics, oomph and chutzpah."

Tom Shales from The Washington Post said that "Ciao Italia works wonderful because it makes Madonna look like she's at home, with her Italian family all around her. [...] A Turin soccer stadium became the sexual center of the universe last year when Madonna, one of our naughtiest superstars, taped this concert there before 75,000 gyrating Italians. Ebullient and insouciant, Madonna sings her hits-including the darkly beautiful 'Live to Tell'—in cavernous stereo; dances engagingly with 14-year-old Chris Finch, the quintessential Lucky Little Boy; and crowns herself queen of teases, bending over to reveal 'Kiss' printed on her underpants [...] Sheer showmanship is present in her performances as well as the camera work of this video." Jim Farber from Rolling Stone said that "this version of Madonna's Who's That Girl Tour returns the star to the medium where she excels best. On videocassette, however, Madonna makes manipulation seem like an exciting message indeed." Colin Jacobson from the DVD Movie Guide however, gave a negative review of the album, saying "Possibly the biggest problem with Ciao Italia regarded the sloppy manner in which the program was assembled. I can’t recall if Italia appeared as a TV special that aired live or if it was taped and edited specifically for future broadcast screenings, but it certainly looked like something that was created on the fly. Sloppy camerawork and editing abound, as those two factors don’t flow together terribly well. It felt as though they tried their best to get appropriate material at the time but that they failed to massage it after the fact."

=== Commercial performance ===
The release debuted at number 17 on Billboard's Top Music Video chart, on June 4, 1988 and reached number eight the next week. The video started a steady climb on the chart, and on the issue dated August 20, 1988, it reached number three on the chart. Ciao Italia ultimately reached the top of the chart, remaining there for eight weeks. It was the 27th top selling videocassette for 1988. The video was certified platinum by the Recording Industry Association of America (RIAA) for shipment of 100,000 copies. By 1992, the release sold 35,000 copies of laserdiscs in the United States according to The Hollywood Reporter. Ciao Italia debuted and peaked at number three on the Canadian RPM Top 10 Video chart on June 9, 1990. It was present for a total of eight weeks on the chart. It also charted at number three on the Finnish DVD chart in 2009.

The concert itself on RAI remains one of Italian television's most-watched broadcasts, with estimates putting ratings between 30 and 35 million viewers, around 61.83% of the Italian population at the time.

== Track listing ==
No.	Title	Writer(s)	Length
1.	"Open Your Heart"	Madonna; Gardner Cole; Peter Rafelson	5:04
2.	"Lucky Star"	Madonna	4:19
3.	"True Blue"	Madonna; Stephen Bray	4:45
4.	"Papa Don't Preach"	Brian Elliot; additional lyrics by Madonna	6:08
5.	"White Heat"	Madonna; Patrick Leonard	7:12
6.	"Causing a Commotion"	Madonna; Bray	4:45
7.	"The Look of Love"	Madonna; Leonard	5:02
8.	"Dress You Up"	Andrea LaRusso; Peggy Stanziale	3:51
9.	"Material Girl"	Peter Brown; Roberta Rans	3:57
10.	"Like a Virgin"	Tom Kelly; Billy Steinberg	4:51
11.	"Where's the Party"	Madonna; Bray; Leonard	5:20
12.	"Live to Tell"	Madonna; Leonard	8:51
13.	"Into the Groove"	Madonna; Bray	6:11
14.	"La Isla Bonita"	Madonna; Leonard; Bruce Gaitsch	4:33
15.	"Who's That Girl"	Madonna; Leonard	4:02
16.	"Holiday"	Curtis Hudson; Lisa Stevens	6:34

Notes

- "White Heat" contains elements from the theme of Perry Mason.
- "Like a Virgin" contains an excerpt from "I Can't Help Myself (Sugar Pie Honey Bunch)."

=== Formats ===
It was released on VHS, Laserdisc and later DVD, in an aspect ratio of 1.33:1 on the single-sided, single-layered DVD.

== Credits and personnel ==
- Egbert van Hees – director
- Riccardo Mario Corato – producer
- Madonna – singer, performer, dancer
- Shabba Doo – choreographer, dancer
- Patrick Leonard – keyboards
- Jai Winding – keyboards
- Jonathan Moffett – drums
- David Williams – guitar
- James Harrah – guitar
- Kerry Hatch – bass
- Luis Conte – percussion
- Donna De Lory – background vocals
- Niki Haris – background vocals
- Debra Parsons – background vocals
- Ángel Ferreira – dancer
- Chris Finch – dancer

Credits and personnel adapted from Ciao Italia: Live from Italy video liner notes.

== Charts ==
=== Weekly charts ===
Chart (1987–1990)	Peak position
Canada Top Videos (RPM)	3
UK Top Music Video (Music Week)	1
US Top Music Videos (Billboard)	1
US Top Videocassette Sales (Billboard)	3

Chart (2000–2010)	Peak position
Danish Music DVD (Tracklisten)	6
Finnish Music DVD (IFPI Finland)	3
Hungarian Music DVD (Mahasz)	17
Portuguese Music DVD (AFP)	16
Spanish Music DVD (PROMUSICAE)	9
UK Music Videos (Official Charts)	28

=== Year-end charts ===
Chart (1988)	Peak position
UK Top Music Video (Music Week)	7
US Top Videocassette Sales (Billboard)	27

Chart (1989)	Peak position
US Top Music Videos (Billboard)	7

== Certifications and sales ==
Region	Certification	Certified units/sales
Japan For Who's That Girl: Live In Japan	—	400,000
United States (RIAA)	Platinum	100,000^{^}
^{^} Shipments figures based on certification alone.
