= The Look of Love (Madonna song) =

1987 single by Madonna

Single by Madonna

from the album Who's That Girl
- B-side: "I Know It"
- Released: November 30, 1987
- Recorded: 1987
- Genre: Synth-pop
- Length: 4:03
- Label: Sire; Warner Bros.
- Songwriters: Madonna; Patrick Leonard
- Producers: Madonna; Patrick Leonard

Madonna singles chronology
"Causing a Commotion" (1987)	"The Look of Love" (1987)	"Spotlight" (1988)

Music video
- "The Look of Love" on YouTube

"The Look of Love" is a song by American singer Madonna from the soundtrack to the 1987 film Who's That Girl. During the film's production, Madonna contacted collaborator Patrick Leonard and the pair wrote and produced the song in roughly two days. The singer stated that the inspiration came from the way James Stewart looks at Grace Kelly in Rear Window (1954), which she described as one of her favorite cinematic moments. A moody synth-pop ballad, "The Look of Love" has been noted for its atmospheric production, drawing comparisons to Madonna's earlier single "Live to Tell" (1986). Its lyrics focus on regret and emotional reflection.

It was released on November 30, 1987, as the third and final single from the soundtrack in Europe, with a later release in Japan; it was not issued in the United States or Australia. Critical reception was generally positive-to-mixed, with reviewers praising its atmospheric composition and Madonna's vocal delivery, while others criticized it as forgettable. Commercially, the song reached the top ten in several European countries, including Belgium, Ireland, Italy, the Netherlands, and the United Kingdom, where its number-nine peak tied Madonna with the Pet Shop Boys for the most top-ten singles in a single year at the time. Madonna performed the song only once on tour, during 1987's Who's That Girl World Tour. In later years, the song was covered by Patrick Leonard and Darren Hayes.

== Background and development ==
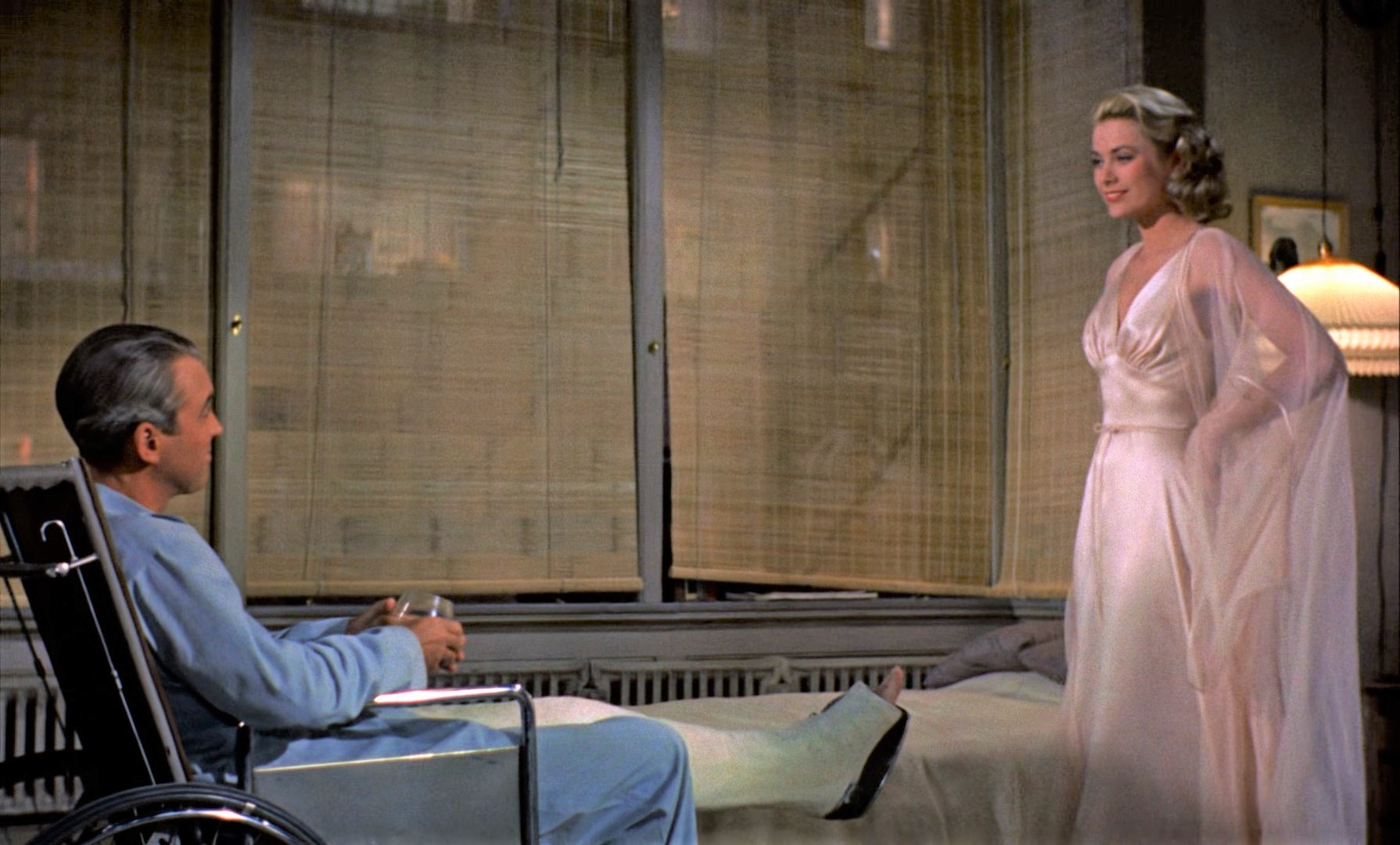
A scene from Rear Window (1954) inspired "The Look of Love", specifically the way James Stewart's (left) character looks at Grace Kelly's (right).

In October 1986, Madonna began filming her third feature film, Who's That Girl, a screwball comedy directed by James Foley—whom she had previously worked with on the music videos for "Live to Tell" and "Papa Don't Preach". The movie stars Madonna as Nikki Finn, a young woman accused of a murder she did not commit; after being released on parole, she sets out to clear her name. Alongside lawyer Loudon Trott (Griffin Dunne), she becomes caught up in "36 hours of high adventure", culminating in a scene where she interrupts a wedding to reveal the real culprit.

Work on the film's soundtrack began in March 1987. Madonna wanted to create songs that would "stand on [their] own as well as support and enhance what was happening on screen". To that end, she enlisted collaborators Patrick Leonard and Stephen Bray, the latter of whom also served as the film's musical director. Together, they wrote and produced four original songs for the soundtrack—the title track, "Causing a Commotion", "The Look of Love", and "Can't Stop". According to the singer, the songs "aren't about Nikki, or written to be sung by someone like her", but that they capture "the spirit" of both the film and the character.

Madonna and Leonard wrote "The Look of Love" while Leonard was simultaneously working on Bryan Ferry's seventh studio album Bête Noire. After completing title track "Who's That Girl", the pair composed "The Look of Love" using a similar collaborative process, with Leonard developing the musical framework and Madonna completing the melody and lyrics. According to Leonard, both songs were written and recorded in approximately two days because "we didn't have any more time". The singer stated that the track's inspiration came from the way James Stewart looked at Grace Kelly in Alfred Hitchcock's Rear Window (1954), a moment she identified as one of her favorites; "I can't describe it, but that is the way I want someone to look at me when he loves me. It's the most pure look of love and adoration. Like surrender. It's devastating".

== Composition and release ==
"The Look of Love"
A 21-second sample of "The Look of Love", showcasing its atmospheric synth-pop arrangement and Madonna's restrained vocal delivery.

"The Look of Love" has been described as a moody synth-pop "rainy grey-day kind of ballad" with an "aqueous production and mysterious melody". Its "atmospheric" composition has drawn comparisons to Madonna's 1986 single "Live to Tell", while Jude Rogers of The Guardian noted its "interesting tide of tropical sounds". The track opens with a low bass synthesizer line and a slow backing track, gradually joined by percussion and high register notes that contrast with the underlying bass, while the final verse incorporates acoustic guitar. Authors Thatiana Aquino and José Fontes Netto identified elements of new-age music in the song, anticipating the musical direction Madonna would later explore in the second half of the 1990s.

It is a song of regret rather than romance, with the narrator calmly reflecting on the departure of a loved one rather than expressing bitterness. In Who's That Girl, the song appears during a montage depicting the uncertain romance between Nikki and Loudon, reflected in lines such as "Should have left you standing right where you stood / Should have let you go, should have had the sense to know". Other lyrics include "My conscience is clear, I know right from wrong". Barry Walters suggested the lyrics hinted at the turbulence of Madonna's marriage to actor Sean Penn, while Albumism's Erika Wolf noted the song evokes a "pang of sadness" when viewed through that lens. John E. Seery later interpreted it as part of a group of Madonna songs concerned with themes of "disciplines of the gaze".

In Europe, "The Look of Love" was released on November 30, 1987 as the soundtrack's third single. It was not issued in the United States or Australia. In France, it was the soundtrack's second single, as "Causing a Commotion" was not released there in order to avoid undermining the success of "Who's That Girl". In Japan, the song was released later, on January 25, 1988. Like its predecessor "Causing a Commotion", no music video was produced for "The Look of Love"; instead, a promotional clip consisting of scenes from Who's That Girl was assembled.

== Critical reception ==
Upon release, "The Look of Love" received generally positive-to-mixed reviews from music critics. Among the more favorable responses, author Debbie Voller described it as "beautiful" while Daryl Easlea called it a "touching" ballad. Author Rikky Rooksby characterized it as "expressive [and] understated", and "the other gem" of the soundtrack alongside "Who's That Girl", while Matthew Rettenmund described it as one of Madonna's "sweeping" ballads. J. Randy Taraborrelli similarly referred to it as an "exotic" ballad. Robert Matthew-Walker praised the track as a "superbly atmospheric" number, likening it to a "half-remembered folk song" and highlighting its understated, serene quality. Vince Aletti of Rolling Stone wrote that its "hypnotically liquid" quality and Madonna's "soft, aching vocals" create the soundtrack's "one poignant moment, an emotional anchor in otherwise cheery, choppy seas".

J. D. Considine for Musician magazine wrote that the song's "carefully controlled passion" demonstrated that Madonna "may well be the savviest woman—singer and producer—in pop", while Andrew Unterberger of Billboard noted that its "eerie quality" befitted its Rear Window inspiration, calling it one of the singer's "most bewitching" soundtrack compositions. Comparisons to "Live to Tell" drew both praise and criticism. Aletti felt that "The Look of Love" "obviously reprises ['Live to Tell']" but "clicks just as surely", while Stephen Holden of The New York Times considered it "as memorable a ballad" as "Live to Tell". By contrast, Joe Brown of The Washington Post was more critical, arguing that the song recycled elements of Madonna's earlier work, writing that it "swallows" "Live to Tell".

In more unfavorable reviews, Caroline Sullivan described "The Look of Live" as a "dreamy" ballad, though she considered it "more filler than killer". Connie Johnson of the Los Angeles Times said it was bland, while Martin C. Strong and Brendon Griffin dismissed it as a song "forgotten as soon as it fade[s] out". Al Walentis of the Reading Eagle similarly called it "so nondescript that [it goes] in one ear and out the other". Eric Henderson of Slant Magazine wrote that if "The Look of Live" was indeed intended as a tribute to Rear Window, he wished Madonna had instead written a "lilting ode to Norman Bates's mother", while Peter Piatkowski of Yahoo! criticized it as a "clunky, loud, overproduced affair" that suffered from a dated production, though he acknowledged Madonna's vocal performance.

In 2012, Billboard named "The Look of Love" one of Madonna's songs that should have been released as a single in the United States, citing its similarity to her successful ballads "Crazy for You" and "Live to Tell", while the Dallas Observer included it among "The 20 Best Madonna Songs You Won't Hear at the Super Bowl". Author Marc Andrews said it was "unjustifiably" excluded from Madonna's 1995 compilation Something to Remember. Billboard additionally ranked it as her 95th greatest song. Andy Jones of Classic Pop magazine wrote in 2025 that "The Look of Love" was among Madonna's best soundtrack work.

== Chart performance ==
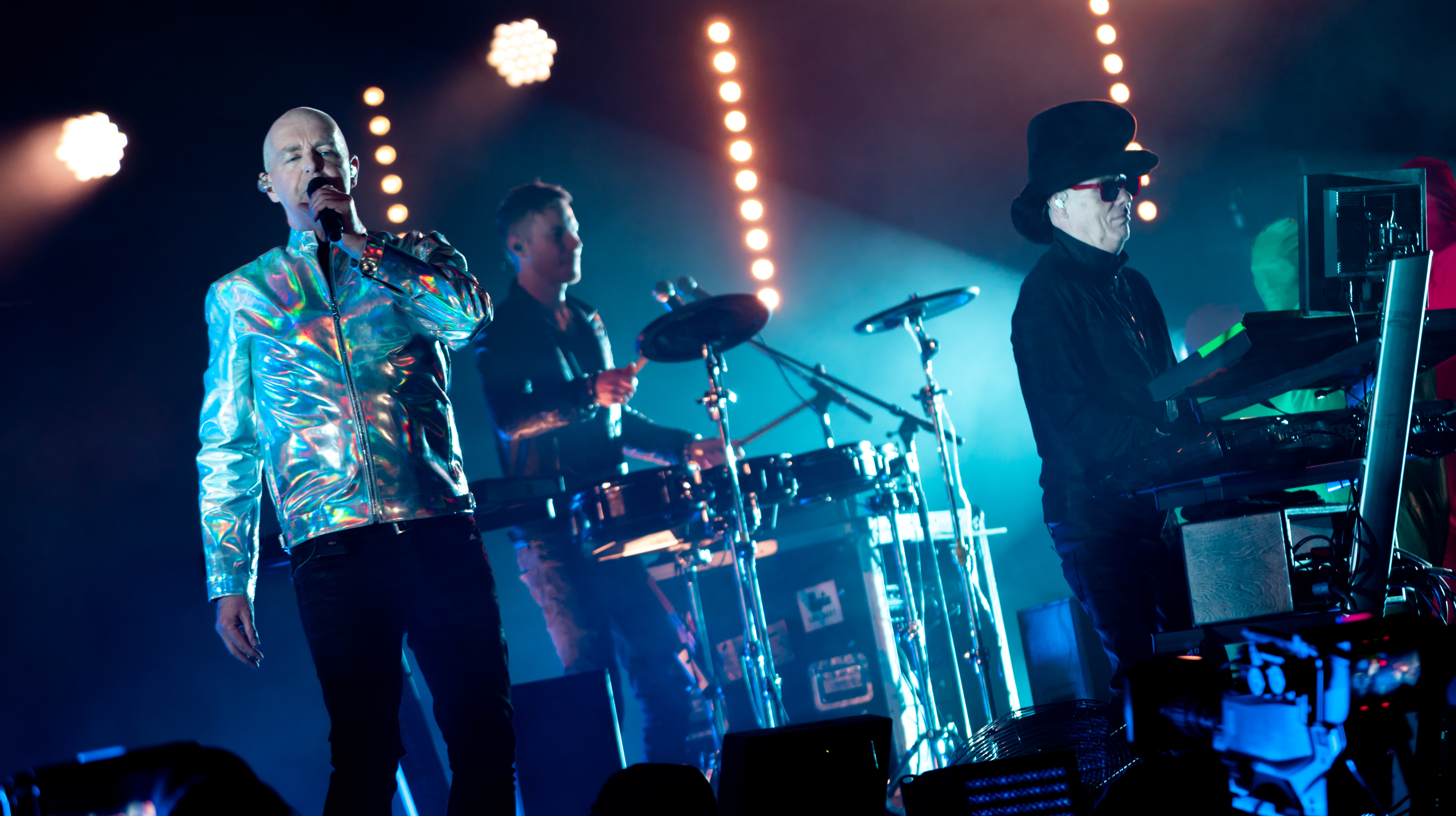
With "The Look of Love", Madonna matched the Pet Shop Boys's (pictured in 2019) record for the most UK top-ten singles.

Days after its release in the United Kingdom, Record Mirror and Music & Media reported that bookmakers William Hill had listed "The Look of Love" as the favorite to reach number one during the 1987 Christmas week, ahead of releases by Rick Astley, Pet Shop Boys, Paul McCartney, The Christians, and Des O'Connor. The song debuted at number 15 on the singles chart on December 12. It peaked at number nine the following week, becoming Madonna's fourth top-ten single there that year, tying the record previously set by the Pet Shop Boys, and her eighteenth overall. It remained on the chart for seven weeks, and had sold 121,439 copies in the country by August 2008. The song also peaked at number five on both the UK 12-inch singles and dance charts, and became the second most-played song on British radio during the week of December 12, behind Michael Jackson's "The Way You Make Me Feel".

Elsewhere, the song peaked at number five in Italy, number six in Ireland, number eight in the Netherlands, number 10 in Belgium's Flemish region, number 18 in Finland and Switzerland, number 23 on France's sales chart, and number 34 on Germany. On the European Hot 100 Singles chart, "The Look of Love" peaked at number 17 and remained for fifteen weeks, marking Madonna's lowest placement there since "Borderline" in 1986. It also reached number 76 on Japan's Oricon chart, where it sold 4,960 copies.

== Live performance and covers ==
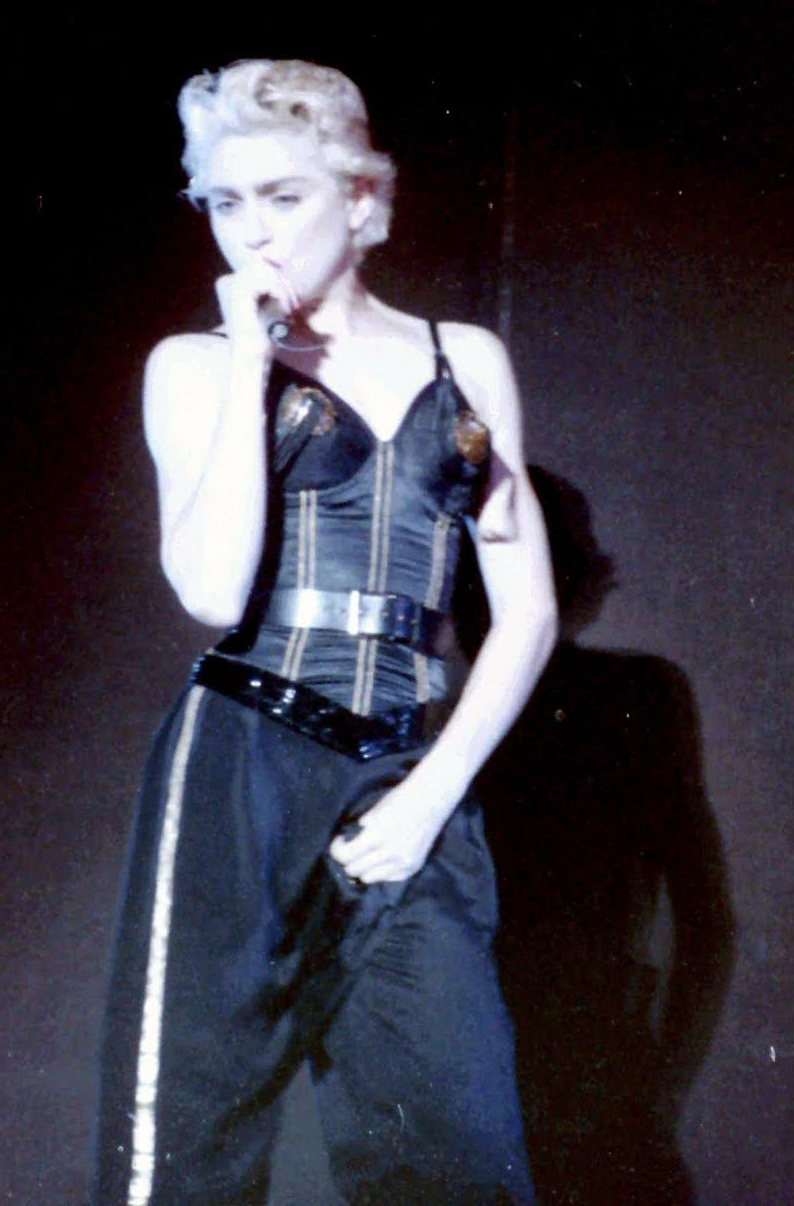
Madonna singing "The Look of Love" on the Who's That Girl World Tour (1987).

Madonna sang "The Look of Love" on her Who's That Girl World Tour (1987), prior to its single release. For the performance, she wore a Marlene Stewart-designed outfit consisting of a fringed bustier, gold side-striped trousers, and fishnet stockings. She sang on a under a spotlight and, at the end, mimed walking forward while being carried backward offstage on a conveyor belt. Italian magazine Ultima Voce praised the number, describing Madonna as singing with "extreme passion" and noting that her eyes seemed "ready to pierce the hearts of many fans". By his part, Richard Harrington of The Washington Post felt it was less effective, noting that the public was still unfamiliar with the track. A performance from this tour was included on the video release Ciao Italia: Live from Italy (1988).

Patrick Leonard performed an instrumental version of "The Look of Love" during An Evening with Patrick Leonard, an acoustic concert held at Joe's Pub in New York City in September 2017, which featured reinterpretations of songs he had co-written with Madonna in the 1980s and 90s. Introduced with a Kraftwerk-inspired modular synthesizer arrangement, the performance blended into "Skin", a track from Madonna's seventh studio album Ray of Light (1998). Australian singer Darren Hayes, who has cited Madonna as one of his "musical heroes", recorded a cover of "The Look of Love" that was released in 2022 as the B-side to the extended twelve-inch remix of his single "Let's Try Being in Love".

== Formats and track listings ==
European 7-inch single

1. "The Look of Love" – 4:01
2. "I Know It" – 4:12

12-inch and CD single

1. "The Look of Love" – 4:01
2. "Love Don't Live Here Anymore" – 4:12
3. "I Know It" – 4:47

== Credits and personnel ==
Credits adapted from the Who's That Girl soundtrack liner notes.

- Madonna – vocals, writer, producer
- Patrick Leonard – writer, producer
- Michael Verdick – mastering
- Alberto Tolot – art direction

== Charts ==
=== Weekly charts ===
1987 Weekly chart performance for "The Look of Love"
Chart (1987)	Peak position
Belgium (Ultratop 50 Flanders)	10
European Hot 100 Singles (Music & Media)	17
Finland (Suomen virallinen lista)	18
France (SNEP)	23
Germany (GfK)	34
Iceland (RÚV).	15
Ireland (IRMA)	6
Italy Airplay (RAI)	5
Netherlands (Dutch Top 40)	12
Netherlands (Single Top 100)	8
Switzerland (Schweizer Hitparade)	20
UK Singles (Official Charts)	9

== Literary sources ==
- Andrews, Marc (2022). Madonna: Song by Song. Fonthill Media. ISBN 978-1-78155-844-7.
- Aquino, Thatiana; Fontes Netto, José (2024). Madonna: 40 Anos de Vanguarda (in Brazilian Portuguese). Editora Dialética. ISBN 978-65-270-1372-3.
- Bordo, Susan R.; Heywood, Leslie (2004). Unbearable Weight: Feminism, Western culture, and the Body. University of California Press. ISBN 0-520-24054-5.
- Bronson, Fred (2003). The Billboard Book of Number 1 Hits. Billboard Books. ISBN 978-0-8230-7677-2.
- Clerk, Carol (2012). Madonnastyle. Omnibus Press. ISBN 978-2-909828-89-3.
- Easlea, Daryl (2012). Madonna: Blond Ambition. Backbeat Books. ISBN 978-1-61713-034-2.
- González, Lara; Pazkual, Igor; Viñuela, Eduardo (2018). Bitch She's Madonna: La Reina del Pop en la Cultura Contemporánea (in Spanish). Editorial Dos Bigotes. ISBN 978-84-948871-2-3.
- Ichbiah, Daniel (2016). Les Chansons de Madonna (in French). CreateSpace. ISBN 978-1-5010-2479-5.
- Matthew-Walker, Robert (1991). Madonna: The Biography. Sidgwick & Jackson. ISBN 978-0-330-31482-4.
- Morton, Andrew (2001). Madonna. St. Martin's Press. ISBN 978-1-854-79888-6.
- Rettenmund, Matthew (1995). Encyclopedia Madonnica. St. Martin's Press. ISBN 978-0-312-11782-5.
- Madonna: The Rolling Stone Files. Hyperion Press. 1997. ISBN 978-0-7868-8154-3.
- Rooksby, Rikky (2004). The Complete Guide to the Music of Madonna. Omnibus Press. ISBN 978-0-7119-9883-4.
- Seery, John Evan (1996). Political Theory for Mortals: Shades of Justice, Images of Death. Cornell University Press. ISBN 978-0-8014-3259-0.
- Strong, Martin C.; Griffin, Brendon (2008). Lights, Camera, Soundtracks: The Ultimate Guide to Popular Music in the Movies. Canongate Books. ISBN 978-184767-003-8.
- Sullivan, Caroline (2014). Madonna: Her Story. Seven Oaks Publishing. ISBN 978-1-78177-179-2.
- Taraborrelli, Randy J. (2001). Madonna: An Intimate Biography. Simon & Schuster. ISBN 978-0-283-07289-5.
- Voller, Debbie (1990). Madonna: The Illustrated Biography. Omnibus Press. ISBN 978-0-7119-2185-6.
