= Trashy Lingerie =

Lingerie store in Los Angeles, California

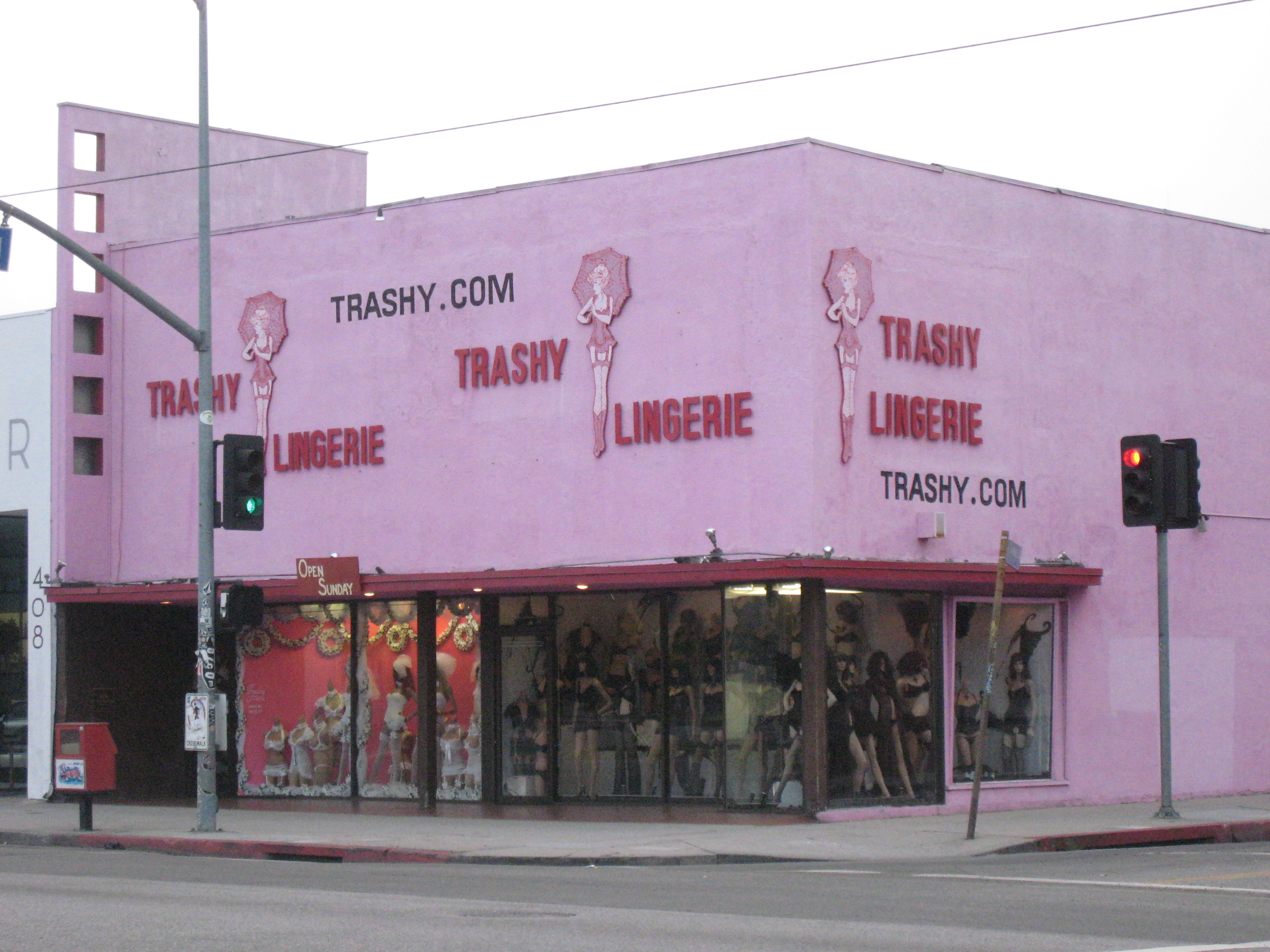
- Trashy Lingerie store on La Cienega Boulevard in Los Angeles, California
- Address: 402 N La Cienega Boulevard, Los Angeles, CA 90048
- Location: Los Angeles, United States
- Owner: Mitch Shrier

Construction
- Opened: 1973

Website
- Trashy Lingerie

Trashy Lingerie is a custom-made lingerie apparel store based in Los Angeles known for its unique designs and its association with Hollywood celebrities. It is well-known for requiring an annual $2 USD membership fee to shop in the store.

== History ==
Trashy Lingerie was founded in 1973 by a local shoe designer, Mitch Shrier, and his wife, Tracy. The store was named after a slingback shoe called the "Trashy", and although the company initially specialized in footwear, by the late 1970s, there was a demand from clientele to provide accompanying hosiery. The Shriers entered the lingerie business by hand-dying stockings in bright colors and by 1979, the store exclusively specialized in selling lingerie. The company went on to develop a full line of lingerie, offering of over 8,000 products consisting of lingerie, costumes, and bathing suits.

Trashy Lingerie went online in 1998. Trashy Lingerie and its sister companies, Trashy.com and Trashy Girls are owned and operated by Mitch Shrier, Randy Shrier, and Mary Loomis-Shrier respectively.

== Media ==
The company's designs can be seen in over 500 films, television shows, commercials, concert tours, music videos and magazine features.

Madonna wore a custom-made, fitted black bustier with golden tassels from Trashy Lingerie while performing "Open Your Heart" during her Who's That Girl world tour in 1987. The bustier was sold at auction for $72,000 in 2011.

The exterior of the store was featured in The Go-Go's music video for "Our Lips Are Sealed". Gene Simmons selected it as the shooting location for his interviews in the documentary film The Decline of Western Civilization Part II: The Metal Years.

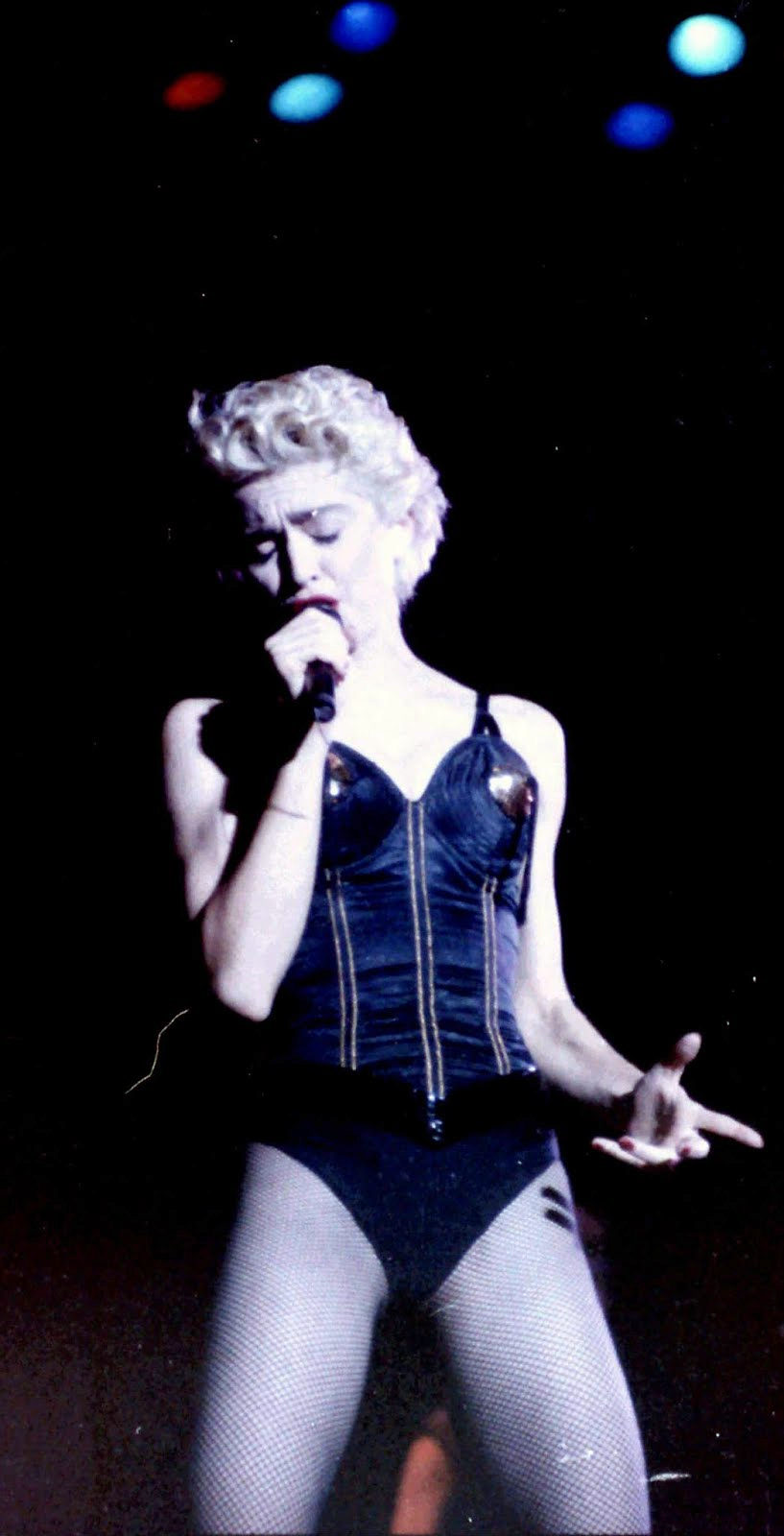
Madonna wearing a Trashy Lingerie bustier on the Who's That Girl Tour

The glamour and erotic photographer Ken Marcus featured Trashy Lingerie's designs in many of his centerfold shoots for Playboy and Penthouse magazines. The shop has also been featured several times in the hit show The Girls Next Door where Hugh Hefner's then girlfriends bought their costumes for numerous Playboy Mansion parties.

Media personality and retired decathlete Caitlyn Jenner wore a Trashy Lingerie corset on the June 2016 issue of Vanity Fair shot by Annie Liebowitz. This was her first media appearance after her gender transition.
