= Michael Davidson (singer) =

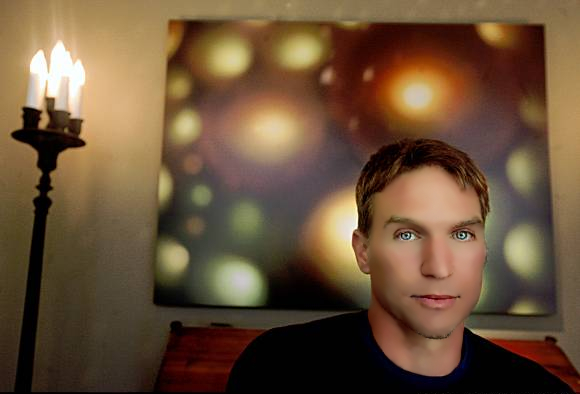
- Michael Davidson in 2009

Background information
- Also known as: Michael Davidson
- Born: Michael Jay Davidson; July 20, 1963 (age 62); New Jersey, United States
- Genres: Pop
- Occupations: Singer-songwriter, fine art photographer
- Instrument: Vocals
- Years active: 1987–1989 (as a singer)
- Label: Sire
- Website: www.youtube.com/user/MichaelDavidsonVEVO

Michael Davidson (born July 20, 1963, as Michael Jay Davidson in New Jersey) is a singer and songwriter.

== Career ==
American-born Michael Davidson was signed to Sire Records on the recommendation of Andy Warhol, after the pair became acquainted during a mutual visit to France. Davidson won the record deal after presenting a number of songs he'd cowritten, including his most well known track, "Turn It Up".

"Turn It Up" was produced by Stock Aitken Waterman and Phil Harding and became a dance hit in 1987. The song was featured in the Madonna movie Who's That Girl. Unlike the movie, the soundtrack to Who's That Girl became a big international success, spending many weeks in the Top Ten Album Chart in the United States, Europe and Asia. Released on July 21, 1987, the album sold almost 5 million copies worldwide, of which 1 million in the US (Platinum). The Washington Post described the song as "gratingly banal" and its singer as "one of Madonna's photogenic protegés" Jerry Smith of British magazine Music Week presented "Turn It Up" an "insistent but rather one-dimensional dance track".

A second single, "Warehouse", was released in 1989, but Davidson was dropped by Warner Bros. during a period of cost cutting at the label, and his album was never released. He went on to a career in fine art photography.

== Discography ==
- Michael Davidson: 'Turn it up', 1987, 12-inch single. Sire Records.

Warner Music: 0–20671. Track list:

1. Turn It Up (In Full Cry mix)
2. Turn It Up (instrumental)
3. Turn It Up (dub mix)
4. Turn It Up (7" remix)
- Michael Davidson: 'Warehouse', 1989, 12-inch single. Sire Records.

Warner Music: 21288. Track list:

1. Warehouse (real club mix)
2. Warehouse (radio mix)
3. Warehouse (groove mix)
4. Warehouse (instrumental mix)
