= Keep It Together (song) =

1990 single by Madonna

Single by Madonna

from the album Like a Prayer
- Released: January 30, 1990
- Recorded: 1988
- Studio: Johnny Yuma Recording (Burbank, CA); Saturn Sound Studios (Sherman Oaks, CA); Ocean Way Recording (Hollywood, CA)
- Genre: Pop; funk; deep funk; R&B
- Length: 5:03 (album); 4:35 (single)
- Label: Sire; Warner Bros.
- Songwriters: Madonna; Stephen Bray
- Producers: Madonna; Stephen Bray

Madonna singles chronology
"Dear Jessie" (1989)	"Keep It Together" (1990)	"Vogue" (1990)

Licensed audio
- "Keep It Together" on YouTube

"Keep It Together" is a song by American singer Madonna from her fourth studio album, Like a Prayer (1989). It was released as the fifth (sixth overall) and final single from the album in the United States, Canada and Japan on January 30, 1990, by Sire Records. Written and produced by Madonna and Stephen Bray, the main inspiration behind "Keep It Together" was Madonna's relationship with her family—whom she dearly missed during her divorce from Sean Penn. The song was dedicated to the American band Sly and the Family Stone. The lyrics deal with the realization of how important Madonna's family has been to her life. A pop, funk and deep funk song consisting of an upbeat rhythm and groove, "Keep It Together" features instrumentation from percussion, banjo and a conga.

In United Kingdom and Europe, "Dear Jessie" served as the final single from Like a Prayer and "Keep It Together" was not released there. Some critics alluded that "Keep It Together" was simply Madonna's version of Sister Sledge's hit song "We Are Family". "Keep It Together" was a commercial success, reaching a peak of number eight on the US Billboard Hot 100 and the Canada chart, while topping the Billboard Dance Club Play chart. In Australia, the song reached the top of the charts as a double A-side single with "Vogue". "Keep It Together" was performed as the closing song of the 1990 Blond Ambition World Tour. The performances were inspired by the 1971 Stanley Kubrick film A Clockwork Orange and during the introduction, Madonna sang a verse from "Family Affair" by Sly and the Family Stone.

== Background and release ==
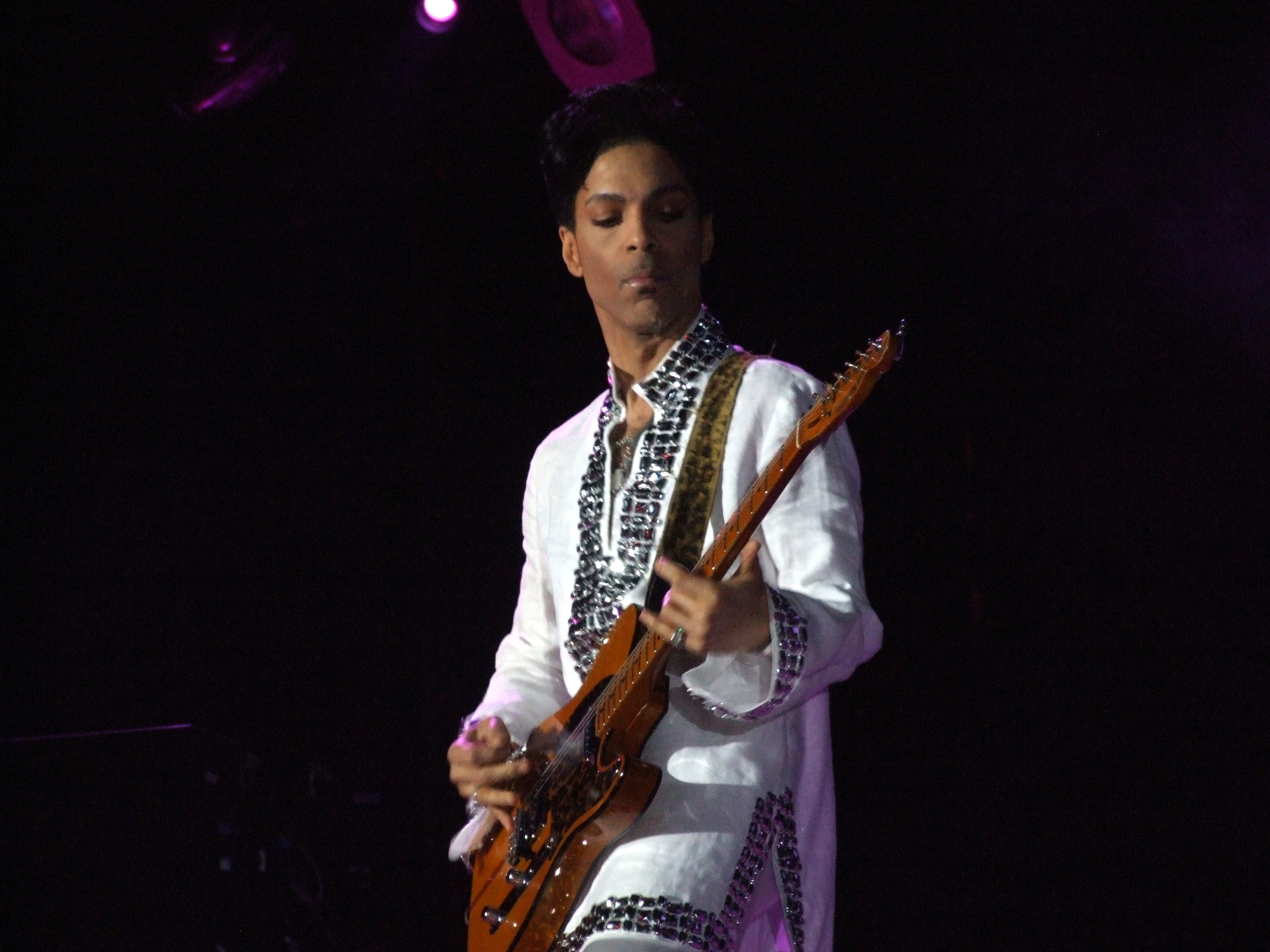
Prince (pictured) played guitar on "Keep It Together", though he remained uncredited.

When Madonna started work on her fourth studio album, Like a Prayer, she was already in an emotional state of mind, following her split with then-husband Sean Penn, her thirtieth birthday, and unfavorable reviews for her acting endeavors. She had certain personal matters on her mind that she thought could be the musical direction of the album. But she understood that as she was growing up, so was her core audience. Feeling the need to try something different, Madonna wanted the sound of her new album to indicate what could be popular in music. However, being raised as a Catholic, Madonna felt guilty about the failure of her marriage. She said, "Because in Catholicism you are a born sinner and you are a sinner all your life. ... I could not escape my past, nor could I relax". Saddened by what was happening with her, Madonna missed her family, her father and her siblings. She confessed to Becky Johnston for Interview magazine:

I didn't feel close to anybody in my family when I was growing up. [...] I didn't feel close to my older brothers, they were just typical older brothers who tortured me all the time. And I didn't feel close to my sisters. There was a lot of competition in our family, [...] so, I worked really hard in school. I was a straight-A student, and they all hated me for it because I did it more for the position I was going to have in my father's eyes that for whatever I was going to learn by studying. Then when I got a little older—when I was in high school and started dancing really seriously—I'd say I got closer to my brothers. My oldest brother opened my eyes to lots of things [...].

The song was released as the fifth (sixth overall) and final single from the album on January 30, 1990, by Sire Records. "Keep It Together" was one of the first singles to be released in a CD maxi format, accompanied by an assortment of remixes. The radio mix stripped the track of its original instrumentation and added an R&B-House beat with the 12" mixes following this style. In Australia, it was released as a B-side with "Vogue" and charted as so; however it was distributed as a standalone 12" single by WEA Records International and later released as a standalone CD Maxi single in 1993. It was not released in the United Kingdom at all, where "Dear Jessie" served as the album's fourth single instead of "Oh Father" and "Keep It Together" respectively.

== Recording and composition ==
'Keep It Together'
A 30 second sample of "Keep It Together", which illustrates the chorus of the song, where in instruments like percussion and banjo accompany Madonna's voice on the track. Near the end of the sample, the percussion sound is thinned out and a mixture of the sound from a live drummer and conga comes into the picture.

"Keep It Together" is a pop, funk and deep funk song with an upbeat rhythm and groove. It was produced by Madonna and Bray, and features Paulinho da Costa on percussion, brass playing by David Boruff and Steven Madaio, Bill Bottrell as the audio engineer and guitars by Chester Kamen. Prince also played guitar on the song according to Madonna, though he was not credited.

Sal Cinquemani of Slant Magazine noted that the song is influenced by the Sly and the Family Stone track "Family Affair" (1971). It starts as the sound of slap bass plays along with sequenced synth bass, as Madonna sings the opening lines, "Keep, keep it together, keep people together forever and ever". As the first verse starts, a guitar comes into play with Madonna's voice being backed by percussion and banjo. After the second chorus comes near the end, Madonna utters the line "Brothers and sisters, They hold the key, To your heart and your soul, Don't forget that your family is gold", the percussion sound is thinned out and a mixture of the sound from a live drummer and conga comes into the picture. The song ends with the main groove sound gradually fading out.

According to Rikky Rooksby, author of The Complete Guide to the Music of Madonna, although "Keep It Together" sonically pays tribute to Sly and the Family Stone, the lyrics talk about the realization of how important Madonna's family has been as a form of stability in her life, especially in the line "Brothers and sisters, They've always been there for me, We have a connection, Home is where the heart should be". The lyrics follow the course of Madonna's rise from figuratively being a "hungry sibling" ("I'm gonna leave this place, So I can forget every single hungry face") to being a superstar ("I hit the big time but I still get the blues, Everyone's a stranger, City life can get to you").

== Critical reception ==
Sly and the Family Stone was one of the major inspirations behind "Keep It Together", which was even compared to the band's own song, "Family Affair".

Mark C. Taylor, author of Nots: Religion and Postmodernism, felt that "Keep It Together" was a "striking instance of her repeated invocation of family values". He believed that Madonna's fascination for family was reflected in the song. Carol Benz, one of the authors of The Madonna Connection, believed that the song was successful in asserting the necessity of family ties. J. Randy Taraborrelli, author of Madonna: An Intimate Biography described the track as "an uptempo romp about the trials and tribulations, and the joys of having a family." Martha Bayles, author of Hole In Our Soul, felt that "Keep It Together" failed to become an anthem for emotional commitment, because of the funk nature of the song. Madonna, Unauthorized's writer Christopher Anderson proclaimed the track as a worthy number-one single, and complimented the song's theme of allegiance to one's family, despite the turmoil and dissensions that occur. Lucy O'Brien, author of Madonna: Like an Icon, described it as an "upbeat meditation on sibling power" and believed that the purpose behind the song was to present a homey image of brothers and sisters happy and together, and Madonna's need to restore bonds and relationships that had become fraught or distant in her life then. Bill Coleman from Billboard stated that "the Material Girl rises above the beat and unveils a most riveting vocal performance." Hadley Freeman from The Guardian described "Keep It Together" as "amazing, purely for being Madonna's take on Sister Sledge's 'We Are Family', a concept no one foresaw, and the fact that she later disowned various members of her family gives it, shall we say, an interesting tinge of irony."

USA Today's Edna Gunderson wrote that "Keep It Together" evoked an "R&B groove" that was successful in adding more variation to Like a Prayer. Conversely, Ian Blair of the Chicago Tribune thought that the different funk tempo of the song distracted from the emotional quotient of the album. Blair added that the song "hits a groove that is one of the funkiest things Madonna has ever done." Scott Benarde from The Palm Beach Post listed the song as one of the album's "downpour" moments. Writing for The Jerusalem Post, Andy Goldberg from the newspaper listed the song as one of the highlights of the album, and complimented the family oriented lyrics. Bruce Britt from Boca Raton News believed that "Keep It Together" was one of the songs from the album, that exemplified the personal approach to songwriting by Madonna.

Spin's Joe Levy named the song the only "great" dance record on Like a Prayer, and also observed that "Keep It Together" was a "girly-disco" song that drew influences from Sister Sledge's "We Are Family" and Madonna's own "Into the Groove". Stephen Holden from The New York Times believed that the song brought the pop-funk style and hippie happiness of Sly and the Family Stone. Journalist J. D. Considine, while reviewing Like a Prayer for Rolling Stone, felt that "Keep It Together" portrayed "an impressive invocation of the importance of family". Considine was concerned that since the confessional nature of the songs on Like a Prayer evoked strong emotions from the listener, "Keep It Together" would probably seem almost trivial by comparison to them. Stephen Thomas Erlewine from AllMusic believed that the song constituted of deep funk music. Jose F. Promis from the same website complimented the single mix of the track, calling it one of Madonna's "best and funkiest tunes, and a prime example of late-'80s/early-'90s dance/house/R&B music". Louis Virtel of The Backlot gave the song a positive review, calling it a "rollicking family reunion" that is the "sunny side of “Oh Father’s” grim familial reckoning." Kenneth Partridge from Billboard described the song as a mid-tempo synth-funk tune with a "tense" groove, on which Madonna offers an olive branch to her estranged father and siblings.

== Chart performance ==
In the United States, "Keep It Together" debuted on the Billboard Hot 100 at number 56, on the issue dated February 3, 1990. The next week, "Keep It Together" jumped to number 41, becoming one of the greatest gaining songs. It eventually peaked at number eight on the Hot 100, on the issue dated March 31, 1990. It became Madonna's 18th top-ten hit in the United States, breaking the record previously held by Aretha Franklin as the female solo artist with the most top-ten hits in history. During the next few weeks, the song fell quickly from its peak as Madonna's next single, "Vogue", began to get massive radio airplay. Its final appearance on the Hot 100 was at number 83 on the issue dated April 28, 1990. "Keep It Together" topped the Dance Club Play chart, and peaked at number 66 on the Hot Black Singles chart. Three months since its release, it was certified gold by the Recording Industry Association of America (RIAA) for shipment of 500,000 copies of the single. In Canada, the song debuted at number 85 on the RPM 100 Singles chart on February 10, 1990, and after eight weeks, it peaked at number eight. "Keep It Together" was present on the chart for 15 weeks and placed at number 86 on the RPM year-end chart for 1990.

In Australia, "Keep It Together" charted on the ARIA Singles Chart along with "Vogue". It debuted on the chart at number 19 and reached the top the next week, remaining there for five consecutive weeks. The song was present for a total of 35 weeks on the chart and reached number three on the Australian year-end chart for 1990. It was certified double-platinum by the Australian Recording Industry Association (ARIA) for shipment of 140,000 copies of the single. After its release in Japan, "Keep It Together" appeared for two weeks on the Oricon Singles Chart, and reached number five. The single was not released in the United Kingdom, where "Dear Jessie" was the final single from Like a Prayer instead.

== Live performance ==
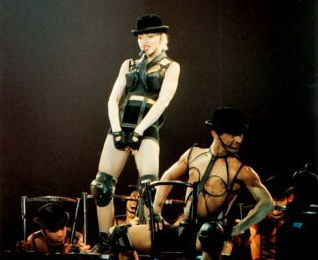
Madonna performing "Keep It Together" as the final song of the 1990 Blond Ambition World Tour

Madonna has performed the song only on her 1990 Blond Ambition World Tour, where it was the closing song of the set list. The staging of the performances was inspired by the 1971 science fiction film, A Clockwork Orange. The shows featured an introductory verse from "Family Affair" by Sly and the Family Stone. Madonna wore an all-black ensemble involving a cage vest, the longline bra, skintight shorts, knee-pads and a bowler hat. Her getup was a nod to actress Liza Minnelli in the film Cabaret. The performance started with her dancers appearing on the stage, with chairs on their back. Madonna appeared in their middle and started doing push-ups on the stage. She started singing "Family Affair", then midway through the song, changed to "Keep It Together". During the intermediate music, Madonna and her dancers performed an intricate choreography with the chairs. At the end, all the musicians, dancers and collaborators came to say good-bye to Madonna. The singer was left alone on stage to finish with a powerful repeat of her line "Keep people together forever and ever".

In an interview with Stephen Holden from The New York Times, Madonna explained the significance of the performance: "Finally, right when you think I'll end [the concert] on a happy note, I come out with my family to do a Bob Fosse-meets-'Clockwork Orange' rendition of 'Keep It Together'. It's the show's ultimate statement about the family, because we're absolutely brutalizing with each other, while there's also no mistaking that we love each other deeply." Author Lynne Layton complimented the performance, saying that "as in her double attitude to materialism, femininity, and everything else, what marks the performance is not that Madonna is in control, but that she is open about the pros and cons of family life and obviously echoes the experience of many." Her thoughts were shared by John LeLand from Newsday, who complimented the aerobics performed onstage by Madonna and her dancers. Conversely, author Allen Metz commented that although the performance was tightly choreographed, the overall feel was marred due to the song's own "shortcomings". Greg Kot from Chicago Tribune felt that the addition of lines from "Family Affair" underlined the "home-is-where-the-heart-is" theme of "Keep It Together". Louis Virtel from The Backlot praised the performance of the song, stating that it served as the "perfect concluding performance." Two different performances were recorded and released on video: the Blond Ambition – Japan Tour 90, filmed in Yokohama, Japan, on April 27, 1990, and the Blond Ambition World Tour Live, filmed in Nice, France, on August 5, 1990. It was also shown on the HBO special titled Madonna Live! – Blond Ambition World Tour, and was added in her 1991 documentary, Truth or Dare.

== Track listings and formats ==
- US and Canada 12-inch vinyl single
1. "Keep It Together" (12" Remix) – 7:50
2. "Keep It Together" (Dub version) – 7:00
3. "Keep It Together" (12" Extended Mix) – 7:20
4. "Keep It Together" (12" Mix) – 6:50
5. "Keep It Together" (Bonus Beats) – 3:27
6. "Keep It Together" (Instrumental) – 5:52
- US CD maxi-single; Digital EP (2024)
1. "Keep It Together" (Single Remix) – 4:32
2. "Keep It Together" (12" Remix) – 7:50
3. "Keep It Together" (12" Mix) – 6:50
4. "Keep It Together" (12" Extended Mix) – 7:20
5. "Keep It Together" (Instrumental) – 5:52
- US and Canada cassette single and 7" single
1. "Keep It Together" (Single Remix) – 4:32
2. "Keep It Together" (Instrumental) – 5:52
- Japanese CD maxi-single
1. "Cherish" (Extended Version) – 6:21
2. "Keep It Together" (12" Remix) – 7:50
3. "Keep It Together" (Dub version) – 7:00
4. "Keep It Together" (12" Extended Mix) – 7:20
5. "Keep It Together" (12" Mix) – 6:50
6. "Keep It Together" (Bonus Beats) – 3:27
7. "Keep It Together" (Instrumental) – 5:52

== Credits and personnel ==
- Madonna – songwriter, producer, vocals
- Stephen Bray – songwriter, producer
- Paulinho da Costa – percussion
- David Boruff – brass, strings
- Steven Madaio – brass
- Bill Bottrell – audio engineer, mixing
- Chester Kamen – guitar
- Herb Ritts – photography
- Jeri Heiden – design
- Prince - guitar (uncredited)

Credits and personnel adapted from the Like a Prayer album and 12" single liner notes.

== Charts and certifications ==
=== Weekly charts ===
Chart (1990–91)	Peak position
Australia (ARIA) with "Vogue"	1
Canada Top Singles (RPM)	8
Canada Retail Singles (The Record)	22
Canada Dance/Urban (RPM)	3
Canada Contemporary Hit Radio (The Record)	8
Italy (Musica e dischi)	16
Japan (Oricon Singles Chart)	96
Japan International (Oricon)	5
UK Dance (Music Week) with "Into the Groove"	28
US Billboard Hot 100	8
US Adult Contemporary (Billboard)	32
US Dance Club Songs (Billboard)	1
US Dance Singles Sales (Billboard)	1
US Hot R&B/Hip-Hop Songs (Billboard)	66
US Cash Box Top 100	8
US CHR & Pop (Radio & Records)	4

=== Year-end charts ===
Chart (1990)	Position
Australia (ARIA) with "Vogue"	3
Canada Top Singles (RPM)	86
Canada Adult Contemporary (RPM)	78
Canada Dance (RPM)	26
US Dance Club Play (Billboard)	28

=== Certifications and sales ===
Region	Certification	Certified units/sales
Australia (ARIA) with "Vogue"	2× Platinum	140,000^{^}
United States (RIAA)	Gold	500,000^{^}
^{^} Shipments figures based on certification alone.

== See also ==
- List of Billboard number-one dance singles of 1990 (US)
- List of number-one singles of 1990 (Australia)

== Bibliography ==
- Anderson, Christopher (1992), Madonna, Unauthorized, Island Books, ISBN 0-440-21318-5
- Bayles, Martha (1996), Hole In Our Soul: The Loss of Beauty and Meaning in American Popular Music, University of Chicago Press, ISBN 0-226-03959-5
- Bego, Mark (2000), Madonna: Blonde Ambition, Cooper Square Press, ISBN 0-8154-1051-4
- Clerk, Carol (2002), Madonnastyle, Omnibus Press, ISBN 0-7119-8874-9
- Layton, Lynn (2004), Who's That Girl? Who's That Boy?: Clinical Practice Meets Postmodern Gender Theory, Routledge Publications, ISBN 0-88163-422-0
- Metz, Allen; Benson, Carol (1999), The Madonna Companion: Two Decades of Commentary, Music Sales Group, ISBN 0-8256-7194-9
- O'Brien, Lucy (2007), Madonna: Like an Icon, Bantam Press, ISBN 978-0-593-05547-2
- Okamoto, Satoshi (2006), Oricon Single Chart Book: Complete Edition 1968–2005, Roppongi, Tokyo: Oricon Entertainment, ISBN 4-87131-076-0
- Rooksby, Rikky (2004), The Complete Guide to the Music of Madonna, Omnibus Press, ISBN 0-7119-9883-3
- Ryan, Gavin (2011). Australia's Music Charts 1988–2010. Mt. Martha, VIC, Australia: Moonlight Publishing.
- Taraborrelli, Randy J. (2002), Madonna: An Intimate Biography, Simon & Schuster, ISBN 978-1-4165-8346-2
- Taylor, Mark C. (1993), Nots: Religion and Postmodernism, University of Chicago Press, ISBN 0-226-79130-0
- Whitburn, Joel (1990), Top Pop Singles 1955–1990, Record Research, ISBN 978-0-89820-089-8
- Zollo, Paul (2003), Songwriters on Songwriting, Da Capo Press, ISBN 0-306-81265-7
