= Blond Ambition World Tour Live =

Video by Madonna
- Released: December 13, 1990
- Recorded: August 5, 1990
- Venues: Stade Charles-Ehrmann (Nice, France)
- Length: 112 mins
- Label: Pioneer Artists
- Director: David Mallet
- Producer: Anthony Eaton

Madonna video chronology
The Immaculate Collection (1990)	Blond Ambition World Tour Live (1990)	The Girlie Show: Live Down Under (1994)

Blond Ambition World Tour Live is a video album by American singer-songwriter Madonna released exclusively on LaserDisc by Pioneer Artists on December 13, 1990. It contained the Blond Ambition World Tour's final show, filmed at the Stade Charles-Ehrmann in Nice, France, on August 5, 1990.

The concert had previously been broadcast on American network HBO as Live! Madonna: Blond Ambition World Tour 90, and became one of its highest rated specials. The decision to release it exclusively on Laserdisc grew when Pioneer Artists signed up to sponsor the tour; the company also wanted to use Madonna to reach a new demographic and increase Laserdisc sales. It received positive reviews, with some critics saying it captured the concert better than the documentary Madonna: Truth or Dare (1991) and the HBO broadcast.

At the 34th Annual Grammy Awards, it won for Best Music Video-Long Form, becoming the first Grammy award Madonna received in her career. With over 100,000 copies sold, Blond Ambition World Tour Live was one of the highest selling laserdiscs of its time.

== Background ==
The Blond Ambition World Tour was Madonna's third concert tour. It supported her fourth studio album Like a Prayer and the Dick Tracy soundtrack I'm Breathless. Contemporary critics praised its fashion and theatricals and it grossed over US$62.7 million ($154.51 million in 2025 dollars) from 57 concerts. It was subject to controversy due to its sexual and Catholic imagery. In Italy, a private association of Roman Catholics called for a boycott of the shows in Rome and Turin; Pope John Paul II urged the general public and the Christian community not to attend the tour. During the first show in Toronto, on May 27, local police threatened to arrest Madonna for "lewd and indecent display", specifically the masturbation scene during the performance of "Like a Virgin" (1984).

In May 1990, Jonathan Takiff from The Pittsburgh Press reported that the first Japanese shows from the tour were recorded and set to be released on Laserdisc by Pioneer Artists, one of the tour's main sponsors. Takiff also reported that the final show on Nice, France, would be broadcast on MTV. Two months later, HBO confirmed they had signed on Madonna and would broadcast the tour's final show in what would be her first television special. HBO spokesperson Betty Bitterman stated that "it's a very hot item that attracted all major players. We're not concerned about any negative feedback. We decided to do the show and that was that". When asked if the network would edit or censor the singer's "lewd" behavior, Bitterman responded that "if she's doing it, the audience will see it. We're not editing anything out. [...] We want it to feel live - as if you were there". During the concert Madonna told the cameras: "You know what I have to say to America? Get a fucking sense of humor, okay?".

It was not a pay-per-view special, as the channel wanted to distinguish itself from its pay-TV rival, Showtime, and it was predicted to be HBO's highest rated special since Mike Tyson and Frank Bruno's heavyweight fight, which aired in February 1989. Advertised as "America's No. 1 female pop star in a live-by-satellite performance of one of the summer's biggest pop music events", Live! Madonna: Blond Ambition World Tour 90 aired on Sunday August 5, 1990, at 9 p.m. and gave HBO a record for the highest ratings ever for an entertainment special at the time; around 4.5 million people tuned in.

== Release and reception ==
The special was released exclusively on Laserdisc under the title Blond Ambition World Tour Live on December 13, 1990. Steven Galloway, president of Pioneer Artists, said that the idea of an exclusive came about when the company signed up to sponsor the tour; they also wanted to use the singer to increase Laserdisc sales and reach a demographic of 18–35 year olds. Billboard called this "the marketing coup of the year". Laserdisc sales were reported to have increased 285%; due to the overwhelmingly strong sales, the concert was not released on VHS until the end of 1991. Although Madonna's then manager Caresse Henry said in 2002 that a DVD was on the works, no release date was ever given. In addition to HBO, other concerts from the tour were also recorded and broadcast; one of the Yokohama dates was recorded and released exclusively in Japan under the title Blond Ambition - Japan Tour 90. Spanish broadcaster TVE aired the Barcelona concert in 30 countries. One of the shows at London's Wembley Stadium was broadcast on BBC Radio 1, which led to controversy over the profanity Madonna used live on air.

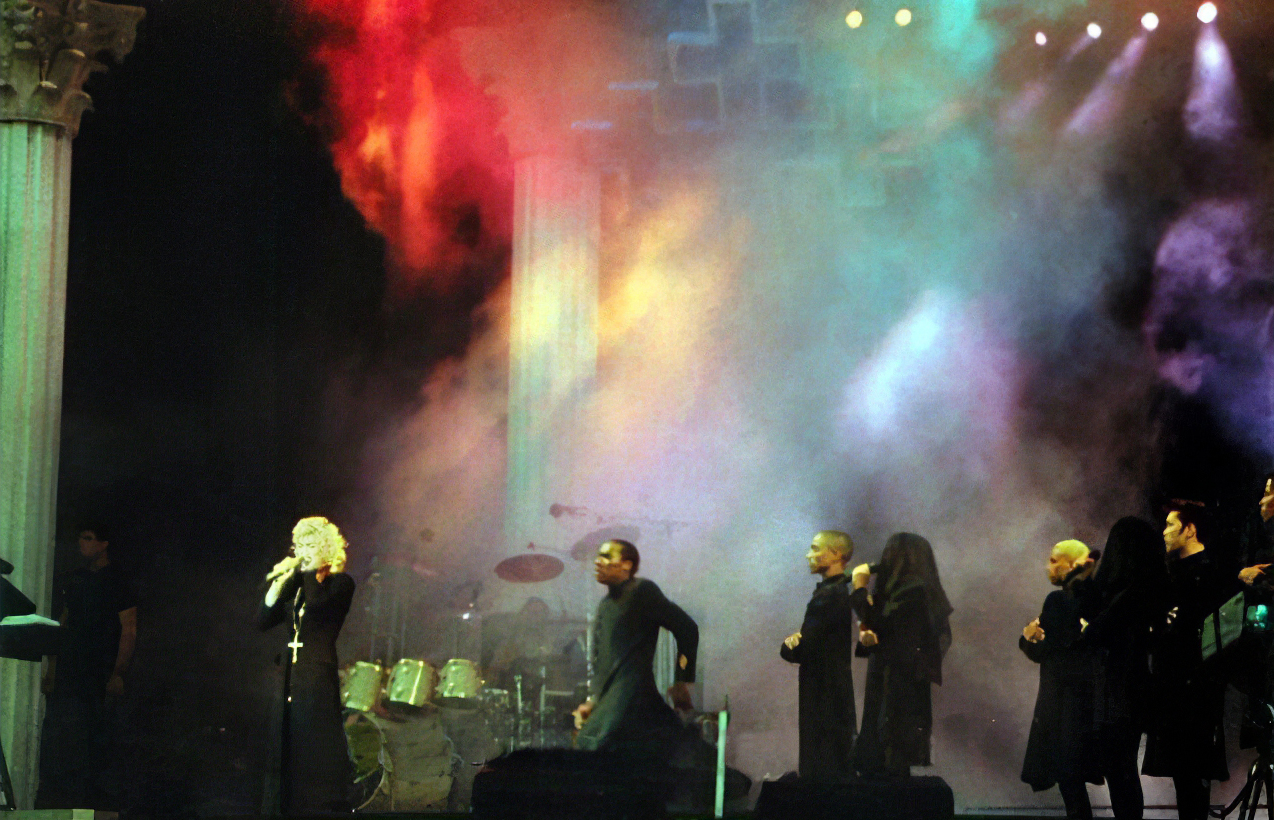
The performance of "Like a Prayer" was praised by Entertainment Weekly's Ty Burr.

The Los Angeles Times gave the original broadcast a negative review, saying that the show didn't work as a television experience because it was "less a concert than an unfolding passion play" that was "rendered ponderous by distracting camera angles". Ty Burr, from Entertainment Weekly, gave the release an A and felt that it captured the Blond Ambition show better than Madonna: Truth or Dare, "because it's a laserdisc with digital sound, the music is re-created with startling fidelity. You get this two-hour spectacle as it was meant to be: uninterrupted and over the top". Burr also praised the "gymnastic dance productions" of numbers such as "Where's the Party" and "Like a Prayer". Los Angeles Times' Robert Hilburn felt that "the new, edited laser version offers much more of the vitality and charm of the show itself than the HBO special". Allmusic gave a rating of three out of five stars.

Blond Ambition World Tour Live debuted on the fourth position of the Top Videodisc Sales chart the week of January 9, 1991, eventually peaking at number two three weeks later. In April 1991, Pioneer applied for an RIAA gold certification, indicating that the release had sold, at least, 25,000 units. Later that year, the compilation sold 40,000 copies of laserdiscs worldwide. By May 1992, it was the top US selling laserdisc release up at the time, with 60,000 copies sold. Two years later, sales exceeded 100,000 units and it was awarded a "five-star" designation by the Laserdisc Association. In the United Kingdom, the laserdisc sold 1,000 copies by 1992, and nearly 10,000 units as of 1993.

== Impact ==
Blond Ambition World Tour Live was released exclusively on LaserDisc by Pioneer in order to boost both format and device sales for CD Videos in the United States. Music critic Robert Hilburn from Los Angeles Times called it a move "virtually unprecedented in the video industry". Pioneer's president, Steven Galloway, stated: "Madonna is the ideal artist to reach the new demographics". Ultimately, the release reportedly helped boost the CD video market up to that point in the U.S. The title "brought much-needed publicity to the laser format", commented Chris McGowan from Billboard. Complimenting Madonna's release, CD Review's Tim Riley said "launching a laserdisc collection is an exercise in frustration".

Blond Ambition World Tour Live earned Madonna her first Grammy win for Best Long Form Music Video at the 34th ceremony. Of this win, Galloway said that "we couldn't be more thrilled [...] Hopefully it will bring an even higher level of awareness and attention to the laserdisc format, and music videos in particular on laserdisc". The HBO broadcast also won a category at the CableACE Awards.

== Track listing ==
Side one
No.	Title	Writer(s)	Length
1.	"Express Yourself"	Madonna; Stephen Bray	7:53
2.	"Open Your Heart"	Madonna; Gardner Cole; Peter Rafelson	4:33
3.	"Causing a Commotion"	Madonna; Bray	4:10
4.	"Where's the Party"	Madonna; Bray; Patrick Leonard	5:18
5.	"Like a Virgin"	Tom Kelly; Billy Steinberg	5:10
6.	"Like a Prayer"	Madonna; Leonard	7:47
7.	"Live to Tell" / "Oh Father"	Madonna; Leonard	5:51
8.	"Papa Don't Preach"	Madonna; Brian Elliot	4:46
9.	"Sooner or Later"	Stephen Sondheim	3:33
10.	"Hanky Panky"	Madonna; Leonard	3:56
Total length:			57:50

Side two
No.	Title	Writer(s)	Length
1.	"Now I'm Following You"	Andy Paley; Jeff Lass; Ned Claflin; Jonathan Paley	7:09
2.	"Material Girl"	Peter Brown; Robert Rans	4:35
3.	"Cherish"	Madonna; Leonard	6:45
4.	"Into the Groove"	Madonna; Bray	8:11
5.	"Vogue"	Madonna; Shep Pettibone	7:48
6.	"Holiday"	Curtis Hudson; Lisa Stevens	7:22
7.	"Family Affair"	Sly Stone	2:33
8.	"Keep It Together"	Madonna; Bray	13:06
Total length:			54:10

Notes

- "Express Yourself" contains an excerpt from "Everybody".
- "Like a Prayer" contains an excerpt from "Act of Contrition".
- "Into the Groove" contains an excerpt from "Ain't Nobody Better".
- "Holiday" contains an excerpt from "Do the Bus Stop".

== Credits and personnel ==
- David Mallet – director
- Anthony Eaton – producer
- Freddy De Mann – executive producer
- Christopher Ciccone – art direction
- Vince Patterson – choreographer
- Kevin Alexander Stea – assistant choreographer

Credits per the notes of Blond Ambition World Tour Live

== Charts ==
=== Weekly charts ===
Chart (1991)	Peak position
US Top Videodisc Sales (Billboard)	2

Chart (2013)	Peak position
Swedish Music DVD (Sverigetopplistan)	17

=== Year-end chart ===
Chart (1991)	Peak position
Top Laserdisc Sales (Billboard)	6

== Sales ==
Region	Certification	Certified units/sales
United Kingdom	—	1,000
United States	—	100,000
