= Oh Father =

1989 single by Madonna

- French vinyl single picture sleeve

Single by Madonna

from the album Like a Prayer
- B-side: "Pray for Spanish Eyes"
- Released: October 24, 1989
- Studio: Garment District (New York City, New York)
- Genre: Baroque pop
- Length: 4:57
- Label: Sire; Warner Bros.
- Songwriters: Madonna; Patrick Leonard
- Producers: Madonna; Patrick Leonard

Madonna singles chronology
"Cherish" (1989)	"Oh Father" (1989)	"Dear Jessie" (1989)

Music video
- "Oh Father" on YouTube

"Oh Father" is a song recorded by American singer Madonna for her fourth studio album Like a Prayer (1989). It was released as the fourth single from the album on October 24, 1989, by Sire Records. The song was not released as a single in most European territories until December 27, 1995, when it appeared on the 1995 ballads compilation Something to Remember. Written and produced by Madonna and Patrick Leonard, "Oh Father" concerns the presence of male authoritative figures in Madonna's life, most prominently her father, Tony Ciccone. Madonna's relationship with her father had soured after her mother's death in 1963 and his remarriage three years later. While developing the Like a Prayer album, Madonna was in an emotional state of mind due to her personal problems, which is reflected in "Oh Father".

"Oh Father" is a baroque pop ballad. It was recorded at a studio in the Garment District of New York City. Leonard put together different types of chord progression and created the basic outline of a melody, which Madonna shaped and then wrote a lyric to fit the melody. She used a contrast of timbre while singing the song, which also featured instrumentation from strings, piano, violin and drums. "Oh Father" received positive reviews from critics and authors, but commercially was less successful than Madonna's previous singles. In most of the countries where it was released, the song failed to attain top-ten positions, except in Finland, where it peaked at number six. It ended Madonna's string of 16 consecutive top-five singles in the United States.

The music video of the song was Madonna's attempt to embrace and accept her mother's death. Directed by David Fincher and shot in black-and-white, it shows a little girl playing in the snow as her mother dies. A grown-up Madonna follows the child and sings the song as the child runs away from her abusive father. Described by reviewers as "autobiographical", the video was listed by Rolling Stone as one of "The 100 Top Music Videos". Scholars noted how Madonna's persona was split into the child and adult in the video, and one writer described a scene, involving the dead mother shown at her wake with her lips sewn shut, as one of the most disturbing scenes in the history of mainstream music videos; the scene was inspired by Madonna's memory of her mother from her funeral. "Oh Father" was performed only on the Blond Ambition World Tour in 1990, where Madonna portrayed a woman trying to find her religion and her battle for it.

== Background ==
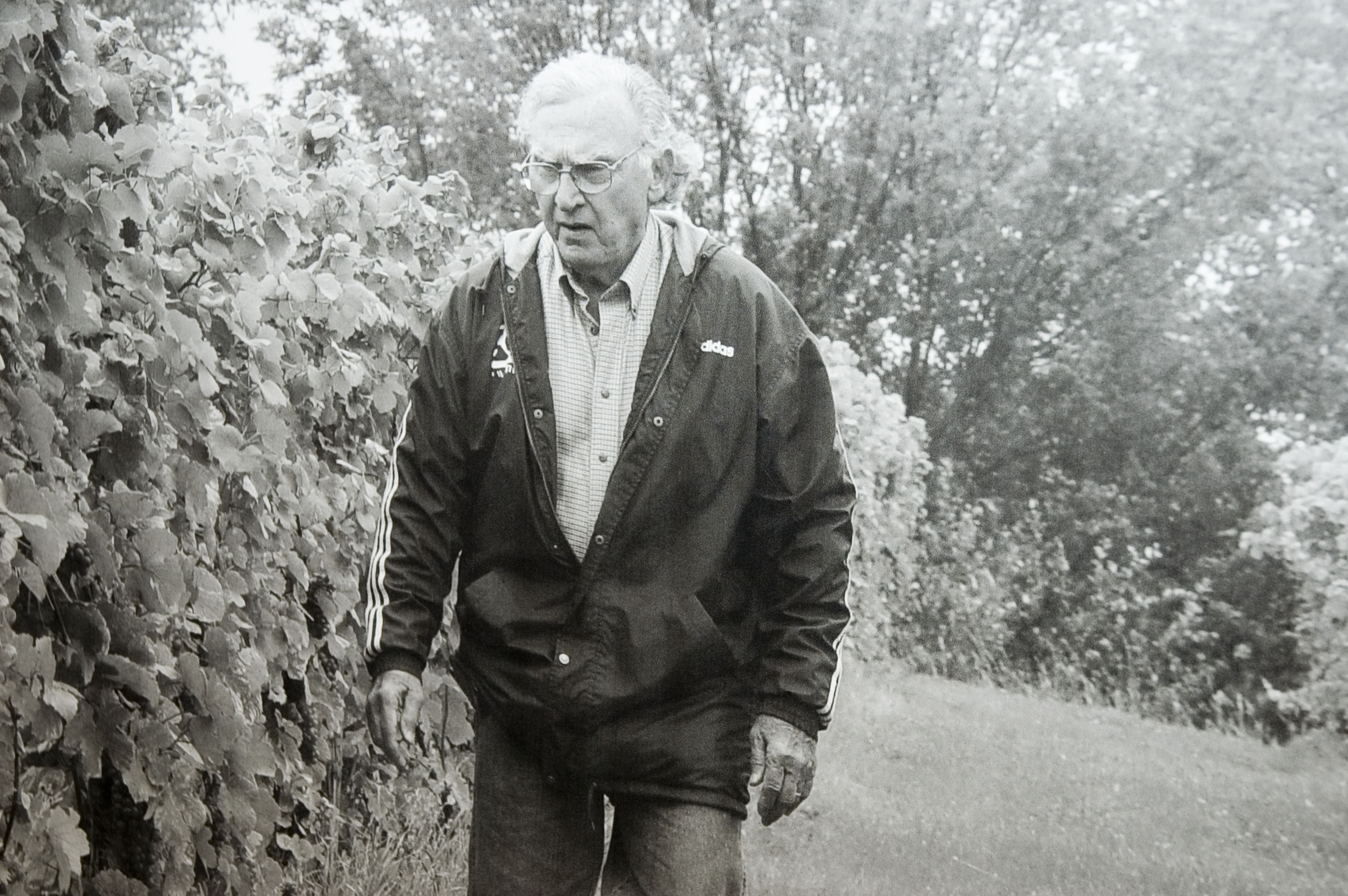
Madonna's father, Tony Ciccone, in 2009. Madonna's relationship with him following her mother's death inspired "Oh Father".

When Madonna was five years old, in 1963, her mother, Madonna Ciccone (whom Madonna was named after), died of breast cancer at the age of 30. Months before this, Madonna noticed changes in her mother's behavior and personality from the attentive homemaker she was, but did not understand the reasons. Mrs. Ciccone, at a loss to explain her dire medical condition, would often begin to cry when questioned by Madonna, at which point Madonna would respond by wrapping her arms around her mother tenderly. "I remember feeling stronger than she was," Madonna recalled. "I was so little and yet I felt like she was the child." Madonna later acknowledged that she had not grasped the concept of her mother dying. "There was so much left unsaid, so many untangled and unresolved emotions, of remorse, guilt, loss, anger, confusion. ... I saw my mother, looking very beautiful and lying as if she were asleep in an open casket. Then I noticed that my mother's mouth looked funny. It took me some time to realize that it had been sewn up. In that awful moment, I began to understand what I had lost forever. The final image of my mother, at once peaceful yet grotesque, haunts me today also."

Madonna eventually learned to take care of herself and her siblings, and she turned to her paternal grandmother in the hope of finding some solace and some form of her mother in her. The Ciccone siblings resented housekeepers and invariably rebelled against anyone brought into their home ostensibly to take the place of their beloved mother. In an interview with Vanity Fair, Madonna commented that she saw herself in her youth as a "lonely girl who was searching for something. I wasn't rebellious in a certain way. I cared about being good at something. I didn't shave my underarms and I didn't wear make-up like normal girls do. But I studied and I got good grades.... I wanted to be somebody." Terrified that her father, Tony Ciccone, could be taken from her as well, Madonna was often unable to sleep unless she was near him. Two years after her mother's death, her father married the family's housekeeper, Joan Gustafson. It was at this point that Madonna began to express unresolved feelings of anger towards her father that lasted for decades, and developed a rebellious attitude. She explained in interviews that "Like all young girls, I was in love with my father and I didn't want to lose him. I lost my mother, but then I was my mother... and my father was mine... When he married my stepmother, it was, 'OK, I don't need anybody.' I hated my father for a long, long time."

== Writing and inspiration ==
"'Oh Father' is like the second half of 'Live to Tell', in a way. It was a combo package—it was about my father and my husband. I was dealing with male authority figures once again. That is a great source of inspiration in my writing.

— Madonna talking about the song to Craig Rosen, author of The Billboard Book of Number One Albums.

When Madonna started work on her fourth studio album, Like a Prayer, she was already in an emotional state of mind, following her split with then-husband, Sean Penn, her thirtieth birthday, and unfavorable reviews for her acting endeavors. She had certain personal matters on her mind that she thought could be the musical direction of the album. While writing the songs for Like a Prayer, Madonna also acted in a Broadway production called Speed-the-Plow. In the play, she portrayed Karen, a secretary to a movie producer who bedded her on a bet with his friends. Karen later gets revenge, but is depicted as just as seedy and conniving as the men who had partaken in this bet and exploited her. Madonna was frustrated with the role and the negative reception, which she vented into her lyrics. The result was a set of three songs—"Till Death Do Us Part", "Promise to Try" and "Oh Father"—where she sought to purge herself from her personal paranoia and demons.

Written with producer Patrick Leonard, in "Oh Father" the singer wanted to revisit the pain and confusion that had characterized her relationship with her father. Generally accepted by critics and academics as a love letter to Tony Ciccone or as an indictment, Madonna never explained her inspiration behind "Oh Father", except saying that the song was about her father and a tribute to Simon & Garfunkel, her favorite band at that time. She wanted to leave it open for interpretation.

Although the singer has never mentioned physical abuse in her family, she had mentioned that her father was a disciplinarian and her stepmother was hard on her. Author Lucy O'Brien wrote in her book Madonna: Like an Icon that the song stemmed more from the emotional neglect that Madonna faced, with her father locked up in grief after Mrs. Ciccone died. When he married again, his new wife was wrapped up with her own children, so the older kids were often left to their own devices. O'Brien believed that for this reason, Madonna's girlhood would have been without much joy, and that "Oh Father" was a potent example of the singer using her imagination to escape from her troubled childhood, while blaming it on her father. Tony later said, "Maybe I'm not the greatest father in the world, but life wasn't easy for us, and Nonni [Madonna's nickname] knows all of this."

== Recording and composition ==
When Madonna went to record "Oh Father", her troubled role in Speed-the-Plow was on her mind, with the result being that she vented her emotions in the recording of the song. Bill Meyers, who did the string arrangement for most of the songs on Like a Prayer, including "Oh Father", recalled that Madonna worked on the song with Leonard in "this really dingy, awful little studio in the Garment District in New York. It was grotesquely dirty and cramped, and that's what came out of it."

"Oh Father"
A 30-second sample of Madonna's "Oh Father", where she sings the chorus, backed by drums, string arrangement and piano. The instruments and the chorus appear on top of the sound of violins, which changes its pitch constantly.

According to him, Madonna was moved while singing the song, since the theme suggested incest and the controversial topic of closet beatings. However, her insecurities about her childhood showed up in anxieties during her vocal performance. Meyers said that if Madonna bended a note or sang flat in a certain spot, she would go on doing that consistently as she did not like to vary her voice or change the tone. Madonna recalled that Leonard thought of the melody for the song. After the mixing was over, Meyers complimented Madonna by saying that it was her "strongest" vocal performance.

For the baroque pop ballad, Madonna uses a contrast of timbre, her higher smoother voice with her lower one. The song begins with the sound of violins for about 20 seconds. After this, drums, string arrangement and piano ushers on top of the violins, as Madonna sings the chorus line "You can't hurt me now, I got away from you, I never thought I would." The violins and the drum beats drop after the chorus, but come back again during the next bridge. As Madonna sings the verse "Oh father I have sinned", the violins change their pitch to a higher one. After the second chorus, there is an instrumental break where she sings about the realization that her father did not want to hurt her but she still ran away. The song ends with the guitar and violins fading out with Madonna's voice. In an interview with Paul Zollo, Madonna commented that the "Father" can refer to Tony, God or all the "authorities in her life". In a 2014 interview with Billboard celebrating the 25th anniversary of Like a Prayer, Leonard explained the recording process of the song:

"My favorite thing that we ever recorded, ever—or wrote—is 'Oh Father'... because we knew when we did it, that there was something about this that was in a way kind of the most *real* thing. [For] that song, the 'record' button was only pressed three times. That's it. So it's real. It's something that I really wanted to do and she was kind enough to say 'let's try this,' and it was not easy."

== Critical reception ==
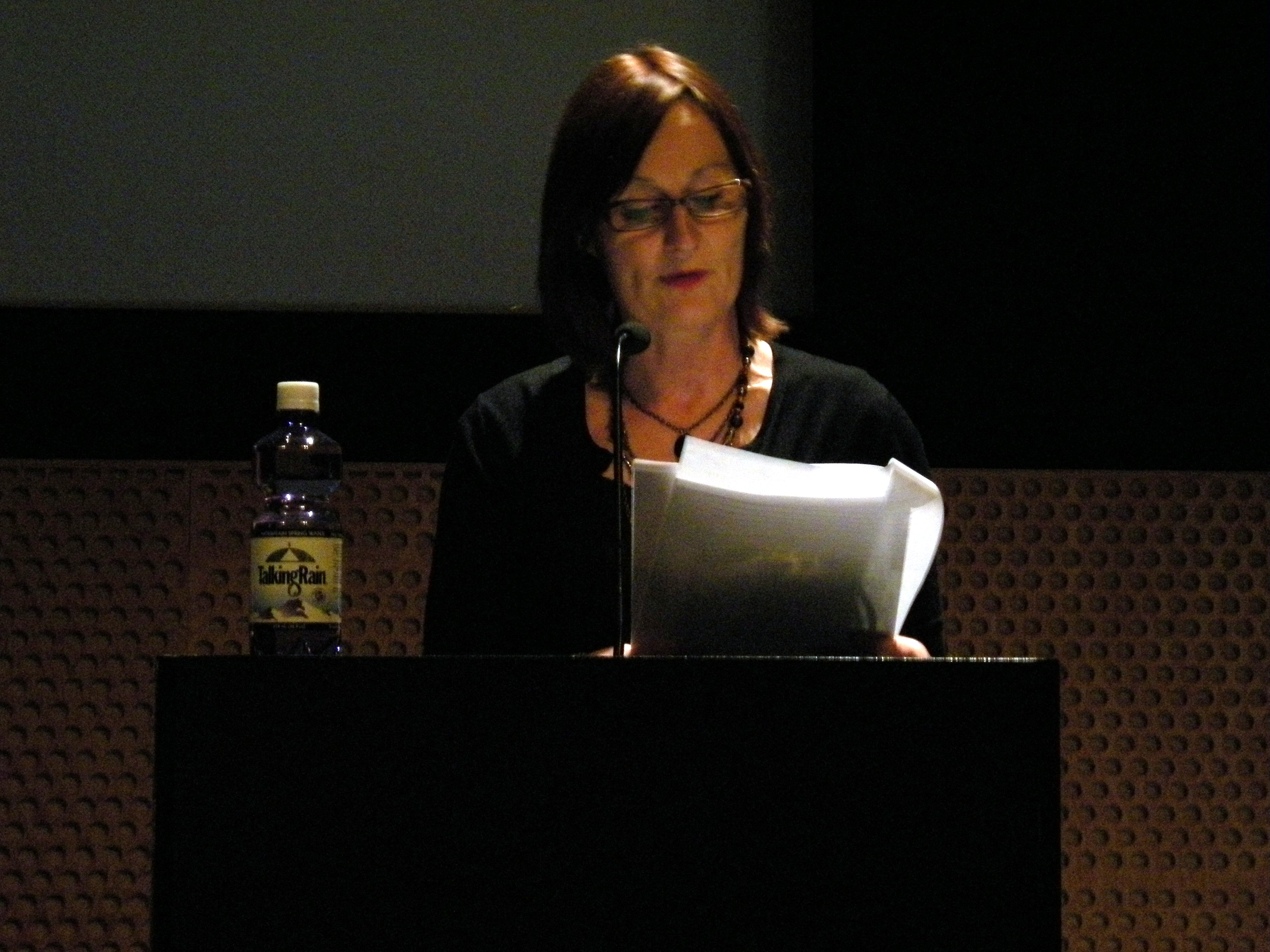
Author Lucy O'Brien referred to "Oh Father" as a dramatic, pretentious ballad, while comparing Madonna's singing to that of Courtney Love.

Critical response for "Oh Father" was generally positive. J. Randy Taraborrelli, author of Madonna: An Intimate Biography, commented that with the track, Madonna exposed herself by transforming her personal experience into art, making it clear to anyone how she felt about her relationship with Tony. Rooksby believed that the "psychobabble" phrases of feeling good about oneself in the song, would have made it extremely popular in the early Eighties. He added that "Oh Father" was the most compassionate and generous moment in Madonna's musical career and the track might have inspired the exploration of childhood in the music of contemporary artists like Kate Bush and Tori Amos, in particular Bush's song "The Fog" from her 1989 studio album, The Sensual World, and Amos' "Winter" from the 1992 effort, Little Earthquakes. Author Leslie C. Dunn wrote in her book Embodied Voices, that the autobiographical nature of the song brought forth a new side of Madonna. Sharing the same view, Freya Jarman-Ivens, one of the authors of Madonna's Drowned Worlds, declared "Oh Father" as a powerful statement regarding father-daughter relationships. Allen Metz, author of The Madonna Companion, described the song as a "stark ballad with a serious string arrangement". O'Brien felt that the strings were dramatic and pretentious. She described Madonna's singing as consisting of "Courtney Love-style rasp" and adding that Madonna "attacks the song with personal passion".

Lennox Samuels from The Dallas Morning News felt that the "great sense of being hurt that is present in 'Oh Father' is far more relatable than any other Madonna song." Kevin Phinney from the Austin American-Statesman called it the strongest and the most shocking song on Like a Prayer. Alan Jones from Music Week said, "It's a complex piece, not her easiest to love, with constantly shifting tempo, pseudo-classical interludes and a strong vocal." Jordan Paramor from Smash Hits gave it four out of five, adding, "It's a rather melancholy, sorrowful affair concerning someone trying to escape the clutches of her strict father. [...] Pleasing enough, despite being a little heavy at times." Stephen Holden from The New York Times wrote that the orchestration of the song was "grandiloquent", while describing Madonna's delivery of the lines as an "angry triumph". Stewart Mason from AllMusic shared Holden's opinion, and described "Oh Father" as "[Madonna's] finest ballad performance ever". He added that the "upward modulation of the chorus, accompanied by some overdubbed self-harmonies that feature a very controlled and effective use of Madonna's highest register, is sheer brilliance, giving the song a steely resolve that removes any taint of self-pity from the verses." Music journalist J. D. Considine, while reviewing Like a Prayer for Rolling Stone, believed that despite the song's "lush" string arrangement, some of the lyrics contain a disquieting degree of pain. Hadley Freeman from The Guardian commented that the confessional nature of the lyrics of "Oh Father" was what appealed to her the most in the song. Negative reception for the song was given by Mark Browning, author of David Fincher: Films That Scar, who called it one of Madonna's weakest efforts, due to the verses sounding more like musical theater than a pop song. Entertainment Weekly's Chuck Arnold wrote that "[Madonna] has done other songs that deal with her family issues, but rarely better than this"; he listed "Oh Father" as the singer's 40th best single. Jude Rogers from The Guardian placed the track at number 28 of her ranking of Madonna's singles, in honor of her 60th birthday, writing: "Lush strings and bassy pianos on this classy 1989 primal scream. Hugely emo, parent-baiting lyrics, but gorgeous in its execution". In August 2018, Billboard picked it as the singer's 64th greatest single, writing that "['Oh Father'] not only set the tone for Madonna's more contemplative, downtempo decade to come, it also provided an early model for the piano-led power balladry of '90s singer-songwriters like Tori Amos and Jewel".

== Chart performance ==
In the United States, "Oh Father" was released on October 24, 1989, and debuted at number 55 on the Billboard Hot 100, during the week of November 11, 1989. The song became Madonna's first single since "Holiday" in 1984 not to enter the top ten in the United States, peaking at number 20 on the week of January 6, 1990. This ended her streak of 16 consecutive top five singles and 17 consecutive top ten singles. It was present on the Hot 100 for a total of 13 weeks. In Canada, "Oh Father" debuted at number 84 on the RPM Singles Chart on November 11, 1989. After nine weeks, the song reached a peak of number 14 on the chart, ending her streak of 16 consecutive top 10 singles, but maintaining her run of 19 consecutive top 40 singles. The track was present on the charts for a total of 15 weeks. "Oh Father" was also Madonna's lowest charting single in Australia at the time, where it peaked at number 59, breaking a run of 20 consecutive top 40 singles.

"Oh Father" was not released as a single in most European territories until December 24, 1995, when it appeared on Madonna's 1995 compilation album Something to Remember. The 1995 single was released with different track listing and artwork which included a photography still from the 1989 music video. The song debuted and peaked at number 16 on the UK Singles Chart on January 6, 1996. It became the third single of her career to miss the top-ten position in the United Kingdom, after "Lucky Star" (1984) and "Take a Bow" (1994). According to The Official Charts Company, "Oh Father" has sold 58,730 copies in the UK as of August 2008. The song also appeared on the Irish Singles Chart for one week at number 25 on January 4, 1996. The song was more commercially successful in Finland, where it reached number six. On the European Hot 100 Singles, the song debuted at number 73 on January 13, 1996. The next week, it reached its peak position at number 62 and became her lowest-charting single on the chart up to that point.

== Music video ==
=== Synopsis ===
The scene showing the little girl's mother in her wake, with her lips sewn shut. Author Leslie C. Dunn declared it as one of the most troubling shots in the history of mainstream music videos.

The music video was filmed during the last week of October 1989 at Culver Studios in Culver City, California, and was directed by David Fincher, who also directed Madonna's "Express Yourself" and Bad Girl videos. Described by Carol Clerk, author of Madonnastyle, as "harrowingly autobiographical", the video was shot entirely in black-and-white and recreates the death scene of a young woman, exploring the tempestuous relationship that ensues between the husband and the daughter she has left behind. The singer recalled in a 1991 interview with Vanity Fair, that she remembered that her mother's lips looked funny in the funeral. When she got closer, she saw that Madonna Sr's lips had been sewn together. This image of her mother had haunted Madonna for many years, and led her to comment that she never could resolve her Electra complex.

I had to deal with the loss of my mother and then had to deal with the guilt of her being gone and then I had to deal with the loss of my father when he married my stepmother. So I was just one angry abandoned girl. I'm still angry. The part of me that goes around saying "Fuck you! Fuck you!" is the part that's covering up the part that's saying "I'm hurt!" I guess all of this came through in the video.

The clip begins with a young girl playing in the backyard as snow falls on the ground. The scene shifts to that of a bedside, where a young woman who has died, lies. Her husband covers her with a white sheet as a priest prays. Madonna, wearing a long, black coat, sings the song underneath a snow-covered, dead tree, as the young girl plays with her dead mother's jewelry. The husband comes and shouts at the girl, tearing away the woman's pearl necklace which drop at the little girl's feet. The adult Madonna is shown lying beside another man singing the song as the little girl visits her mother's grave. The man gets up and slaps Madonna in the face, as the little girl cries in front of the grave. She is taken away from the graveyard by her father, as interspersed scenes show the girl being kissed by her mother, her trying to reach the knob of a door, and Madonna powdering the bruise mark on her face.

As the singer walks through a forest, the father is shown resorting to drinking in grief. A funeral scene follows, showing the girl walking up to her mother's wake. When she sees her mother's lips sealed with thread, she runs away from the wake. Madonna walks through a house, where shadows show the girl being scolded and shouted at by the father. Ultimately she walks to the graveyard and stands beside an old man, implying that she herself is the little girl portrayed. The video ends with the little girl dancing in front of her mother's grave as snow falls around her.

=== Reception and analysis ===
"Typical Fincher features are present: black and white, shadows, leisurely camera movement, extreme high angles, and some slow motion. A black and white setting dissolves between shots, creating a sense of fluidity between scenes and images, and many scenes are shot in snow, particularly the reverse-tracking shot in the opening from the snowscape into the house."

— Browning talking about the music video in his book, David Fincher: Films That Scar

Madonna later said that the end of the video was "my attempt to embrace and accept my mother's death". According to feminist writer E. Ann Kaplan, the video is said to have taken stylistic inspiration from the 1941 Orson Welles film, Citizen Kane. She described the video as a "typical adolescent story in Western cultural terms". It foregrounds Madonna's repressive Catholic upbringing and her conflicted relationship not only to her literal father in the video, but also a symbolic one—the Holy Father, the Law and the Patriarchy.

Bruce David Forbes, author of Religion and Popular Culture in America, felt that the video drew on Madonna's childhood experiences and dramatized her efforts to renegotiate these relationships, in her daily interactions with her lover and father, and in relation to Catholicism, which the singer referred to in the line "Oh father I have sinned". Dunn noticed that like the Pepsi commercial shot for her earlier single "Like a Prayer", Madonna's persona is split into a child and adult, who repeatedly fuse and separate. Leslie C. Dunn commented that as the narrative developed, the child is shown singing, but the adult Madonna's voice is heard, and when the adult Madonna appears in a hallway, her shadow is that of a child. Madonna responded to these observations by saying: "I think the biggest reason I was able to express myself and not be intimidated was not having a mother."

Dunn then moved onto the scene during the funeral, when the child trembled from seeing her mother's lips sewn shut. Described by her as one of the most troubling shots in mainstream music videos, the scene was inspired by Madonna's memory of her mother lying in her wake. In the 1990 MTV special hosted by Kurt Loder titled Breakfast with Madonna, Loder described the video as "amazing", then asked Madonna if her father had seen it. Madonna responded, "To tell you the truth, I don't know if he's seen it. I'm sort of afraid to ask." After MTV world-premiered the video on November 11, 1989, they wanted to pull it off broadcast until the scene with the lips shut was removed. Madonna disagreed and told them that she would cancel future deals with the channel, prompting MTV to air the video again. The music video has been honored by Rolling Stone as one of "The 100 Top Music Videos", placed at number 66. In 1991, the video received a nomination at the 33rd Grammy Awards, in the category of Best Short Form Music Video. Madonna's vision of reconciliation in the music videos of both "Oh Father" and her 1986 single "Papa Don't Preach" was later included in the third level of Madonna Studies, a controversial development of a field in media studies during the 1990s. The music video for "Oh Father" is commercially available on Madonna's The Immaculate Collection (1990) DVD/VHS compilation.

== Live performance and covers ==
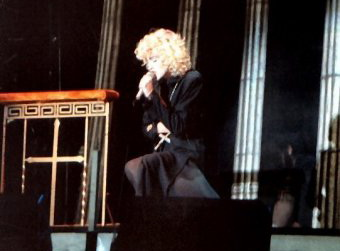
Madonna performing a medley of "Live to Tell" and "Oh Father" during the Blond Ambition World Tour (1990), while kneeling on an altar

Madonna performed "Oh Father" on her 1990 Blond Ambition World Tour in a medley with "Live to Tell", during the second segment of the show. As the performance of "Like a Prayer" ended, Madonna, who was dressed in a clergyman's robe with a crucifix around her neck, and a veil around her head, knelt on a church nave, while incense fumes wafted around her. She started singing "Live to Tell" from a confession bench, with Roman columns and a platform full of votive candles in the background. In the middle of the song, she started singing "Oh Father" while a dancer in a black frock played the role of a priest. The dancer, Carlton Wilborn, recalled that this performance required a lot of rehearsal time, since the dance portrayed Madonna as a woman trying to find her religion. He explained: "One side knew she needed it, another side was resistant, and our dance represented that battle inside." At the end of the performance, Wilborn pushed down Madonna's head before pulling her back up again, thus portraying his role as the priest, trying to wake up Madonna to the importance of religion. Two different performances were taped and released on video, the Blond Ambition – Japan Tour 90, taped in Yokohama, Japan, on April 27, 1990, and the Blond Ambition World Tour Live, taped in Nice, France, on August 5, 1990.

British alternative band My Vitriol released a rock version of the song on their 2001 album, Finelines. A cover version by Giant Drag done in folk rock style was included on the 2007 Madonna tribute compilation Through the Wilderness. Sia covered the song on her 2010 album, We Are Born. K. Ross Hoffman from AllMusic praised this version, saying that Sia's voice sounded throaty and it "recalled any number of tortured '90s alt-rock songstresses". Caryn Ganz of Rolling Stone said that Sia's cover "finds the sweetness in [the original song], brightening it into an airy, blippy closer."

== Track listing and formats ==
- 7" / Cassette Single (US)
1. "Oh Father" (7" Edit) – 4:20
2. "Spanish Eyes" (LP Version) – 5:15
- UK Cassette Single (1995)
1. "Oh Father" (LP Version) – 4:58
2. "Live to Tell" (Live Edit from Ciao Italia) – 6:22
- UK CD Single (1995)
1. "Oh Father" (LP Version) – 4:58
2. "Live to Tell" (Live Edit from Ciao Italia) – 6:22
3. "Why's It So Hard" (Live from The Girlie Show) – 5:12

== Credits and personnel ==
- Madonna – vocals, songwriter, producer
- Patrick Leonard – songwriter, producer, arranger
- Bill Meyers – arranger
- Bruce Gaitsch – acoustic guitar
- Chester Kamen – guitar
- Guy Pratt – bass guitar
- Chuck Findley – arranger, brass
- Jonathan Moffett – drums
- Camille – violin, background vocals
- Donna De Lory – background vocals
- Niki Haris – background vocals
- Paulinho da Costa – percussion
- Herb Ritts – cover art photographer

Credits and personnel adapted from Like a Prayer album liner notes.

== Charts ==
1989–1990 weekly chart performance for "Oh Father"
Chart (1989–1990)	Peak position
Australia (ARIA)	59
Canada Top Singles (RPM)	14
France (SNEP)	26
Italy (Musica e dischi)	6
US Billboard Hot 100	20
US Cash Box Top 100	15
US Radio & Records CHR & Pop Charts	18

1996 weekly chart performance for "Oh Father"
Chart (1996)	Peak position
Europe (European Hot 100)	62
Finland (Suomen virallinen lista)	6
Ireland (IRMA)	25
Italy (Musica e dischi)	6
UK Singles (Official Charts)	16
