= Like a Prayer (album) =

1989 studio album by Madonna

Studio album by Madonna
- Released: March 20, 1989
- Recorded: September 1988 – January 1989
- Studios: Johnny Yuma Recording, Burbank; Saturn Sound, Sherman Oaks; Ocean Way, Hollywood; Paisley Park, Chanhassen
- Genre: Pop
- Length: 51:16
- Labels: Sire; Warner Bros.
- Producers: Madonna; Patrick Leonard; Stephen Bray; Prince

Madonna chronology
You Can Dance (1987)	Like a Prayer (1989)	I'm Breathless (1990)

Singles from Like a Prayer
- 1. "Like a Prayer" Released: March 3, 1989; 2. "Express Yourself" Released: May 9, 1989; 3. "Cherish" Released: August 1, 1989; 4. "Oh Father" Released: October 24, 1989; 5. "Dear Jessie" Released: December 4, 1989; 6. "Keep It Together" Released: January 30, 1990

Like a Prayer is the fourth studio album by American singer and songwriter Madonna. It was released on March 20, 1989, by Sire Records. It saw Madonna continue to work with the producers Patrick Leonard and Stephen Bray, with whom she had collaborated on her previous album True Blue (1986), and the soundtrack for the 1987 film Who's That Girl. The musician Prince also collaborated on the record, co-writing and co-producing one of the tracks alongside Madonna. Her most introspective release at the time, Like a Prayer is a pop record with elements of rock and dance-pop. Its lyrics deal with personal themes she had been too afraid to approach on previous albums: her Catholic upbringing, her troubled marriage to actor Sean Penn, the death of her mother, and her relationship with her father.

Upon its release, Like a Prayer received universal acclaim from music critics, who praised its introspective tone, cohesiveness, and Madonna's increased artistic maturity. Commercially, it was an international success, reaching the top of the charts in 20 countries. Certified quadruple platinum by the Recording Industry Association of America, Like a Prayer has sold over five million copies in the US and 15 million copies worldwide. Six singles were released from the album: the title track, "Like a Prayer", became Madonna's seventh number-one hit on the US Billboard Hot 100, while "Express Yourself" and "Cherish" both peaked at number two, and "Keep It Together" became a top-ten hit.

The album was promoted on Madonna's third concert tour, 1990's Blond Ambition World Tour, which visited cities in Asia, North America, and Europe. In retrospective reviews, Like a Prayer has been noted as a turning point in Madonna's career; she began to be seen as a serious artist rather than a mere pop star. Critics and authors also noted the album's influence on the subsequent work of female singers. Often referred to as one of the greatest albums of all time, Like a Prayer has been included in several musical reference books and best-of lists, including Rolling Stone's 500 Greatest Albums of All Time and Apple Music's 100 Best Albums.

== Background ==
"Because in Catholicism you are a born sinner and you're a sinner all your life. No matter how you try to get away from it, the sin is within you all the time. It was this fear that haunted me; it taunted and pained me every moment. My music was probably the only distraction I had".

— Madonna talking about her Catholic upbringing, one of the themes that shaped Like a Prayer.

1988 was a quiet year on the recording front for Madonna. Following the lack of critical and commercial success of her 1987 film Who's That Girl, she acted in the Broadway production Speed-the-Plow. However, unfavorable reviews once again caused her discomfort. Her marriage to actor Sean Penn ended and the couple filed for divorce in January 1989. Madonna had also turned 30, the same age at which her mother had died, and thus experienced more emotional turmoil. "I wouldn't say [turning 30] was traumatic [...] [but] [it] was the age my mother was [when she died]. I just flipped because I kept thinking, 'I'm now outliving my mother'", she recalled.

As the new decade was approaching, the "greed is good" mentality of the mid-1980s was starting to fade away because of Black Monday. The rise of rap acts like Public Enemy and Run-DMC, and alternative rock bands like Faith No More and Jane's Addiction, changed the public mood; Madonna came to the conclusion that she had to move away from teen appeal and the "commercial gloss" of her previous works if she wanted to reach more mature audiences and secure longevity in the music industry. She wanted her new sound to be "instinctive rather than calculating", and knew her next record had to be "vibrant, challenging, and different".

Realizing that it was time to show a "darker, more spiritual side" of her, Madonna took a "more sophisticated approach"; she revealed that, "in the past I wrote a lot of songs that [revealed my inner self], but I felt they were too honest or too frightening or too scary and I decided not to record them". Thoughtfully, she sifted through her personal journals and diaries, and began considering her options. She had certain matters on her mind, including her troubled relationship with Penn, her family, the loss of her mother, and even her belief in God; "What was it I wanted to say? I wanted [the album] to speak to things on my mind", she explained.

== Development ==
"I would go [to the studio] in the morning [...] She would come in about 11 and I would have the musical idea on whatever piece of gear I was using [...] [She'd] write the lyrics in an hour, the same amount of time it took me to write the music. And then she'd sing it. We'd do some harmonies, she'd sing some harmony parts, and usually by three or four in the afternoon, she was gone".

— Patrick Leonard on working with Madonna.

According to author Mark Bego, a lot of the "somberness" on Like a Prayer stemmed from what Madonna was experiencing while she was in New York working on Speed-the-Plow. The role, which she described as "incredibly draining and spiritually depressing", as well as the play's introspective themes, caused her to feel "frustration and despair". She was upset and dealing with a lot of sadness that she had not felt in a long time. She went on to say that, whereas her previous albums came from the "little girl" in her, interested only in "being entertaining and charming and frivolous", Like a Prayer is the "adult side [of me], which is concerned with being brutally honest". The record drew its title from Catholicism's influence on Madonna's early life, as well as her struggles with religion; "the theme [of Catholicism] runs rampant [on the album] [...] It's me struggling with the mystery and magic that surrounds it. My own Catholicism is in constant upheaval", she said.

For the album, Madonna chose to work with Stephen Bray and Patrick Leonard, with whom she had collaborated on her previous studio album True Blue (1986), and the Who's That Girl soundtrack (1987). Both Bray and Leonard wanted to bring their unique style to the project, and developed different musical ideas to present to Madonna; Bray's approach was more "kinetic" and dance pop-oriented, while Leonard's focused more on melodies. Madonna was aware of the contrast between the producers' work, but never did anything to deter them, as she felt tension was "good for creativity and business". It was Leonard who convinced Madonna to create songs that were "intensely emotional experiences". His working style was "completely intellectual", whereas Madonna relied more on instinct. He would create the music while she worked on the lyrics; "[Pat] puts together these really strange chord progressions and these really great time signatures [...] I'd start singing words to it and making them fit", the singer explained. All the songs had one common theme: Madonna's Catholicism, her family and relationships.

Title track "Like a Prayer" was the first song Madonna and Leonard worked on; once she had conceptualized how she would combine her ideas with Leonard's music, she wrote the lyrics in about three hours. "Promise to Try" followed the same dynamic: Madonna sang as Leonard played piano. In just two weeks, they had created "Like a Prayer", "Till Death Do Us Part", "Promise to Try", "Cherish", "Dear Jessie", and "Spanish Eyes". Leonard recalled that they only wrote songs that would be included on the final track listing; "[we] wrote a song a day, and we didn't change them [...] that's it. A few hours and they were done". Despite this mentality, they created other songs: "Supernatural" ―issued as a B-side on the "Cherish" single―, "Just a Dream" ―given to Madonna's backup singer Donna De Lory for her debut album―, and "Angels with Dirty Faces"; In 2019, Leonard uploaded some of the demos he worked on with Madonna to YouTube.

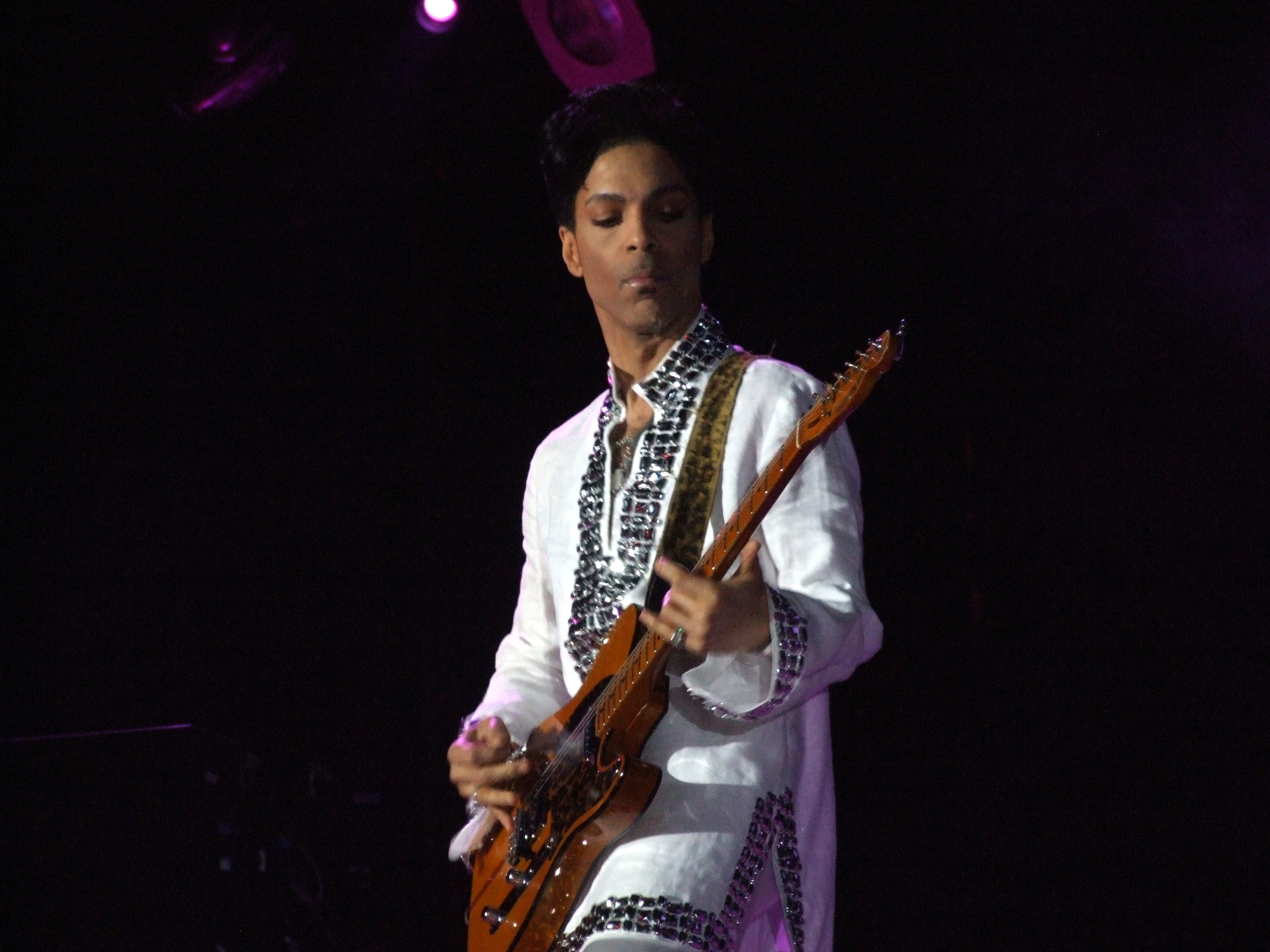
Prince (pictured) collaborated with Madonna on the composition and production of "Love Song".

Madonna's sessions with Bray were similar; he would send her demos and they would get together and work on the ones she would approve. Bray would come up with a verse or chorus and, alongside Madonna, created the bridge. As with Leonard, the singer was in charge of the lyrics and intervened in the final touches; "I've always done the ribcage and the skeleton of the songs, she's there for the last things like the eyebrows and the haircut", noted Bray. The songs they came up with were "Express Yourself", "Keep It Together", "First is a Kiss", and "Love Attack"; these last two, however, were scrapped from the track list as they did not align with the album's "confessional" mood.

Prince also worked on the album. He and Madonna met at the 1985 American Music Awards and quickly became friends. They talked about collaborating multiple times, and even considered writing a musical together. Madonna flew to Prince's Paisley Park studios where they created several songs, but none were ever completed. Sessions were messy, as the two artists had different personalities: Madonna was more organized while Prince liked things "mercurial and improvisational". Madonna then returned to Los Angeles to start rehearsals for Speed-the-Plow; some time later, Prince went to New York to see a performance of the play and gave the singer a rough tape with the songs they had recorded over the phone. "Love Song" was one of the songs on the tape and the only one Madonna liked. Despite wanting to get together to complete the track, Madonna and Prince ended up working long-distance, sending each other tapes back and forth; "it was great. It was a completely different way to work", recalled Madonna. Prince also played guitar on "Like a Prayer", "Keep It Together", and "Act of Contrition", though he remained uncredited.

== Recording ==
"I've worked with live musicians before, but this is the first time we were all together in one room [...] It made it different, because, obviously, when the musicians are playing with you, you respond differently from when the track is already done".

— Madonna on working with live musicians for the first time.

Recording took place at Los Angeles' Johnny Yuma, Saturn Sound and Ocean Way Recording studios, and Prince's Paisley Park, from September 1988 to January 1989. As it was an album with "so bleak an outlook", sessions were generally very focused; they took place mainly at Johnny Yuma, the studio Madonna and Leonard built with the income from True Blue. According to author Lucy O'Brien, Madonna was a "new woman in the studio"; she had clear knowledge not only of the instrumentation, but knew how to articulate and achieve the sounds she heard in her head. Leonard recalled that Madonna usually worked fast, but due to its emotional tone, it took her "maybe three or four times as long to make [Like a Prayer] because she kept breaking down". As it was the second time she produced an album, Madonna felt she had to "prove to everyone [it] wasn't a fluke", and would get into fights with Leonard. The producer recalled that during one of their arguments, the singer held up the True Blue cover and shouted at him, 'Whose picture is that?'; the fights stopped from there on.

Unlike her previous albums, Like a Prayer was recorded in the studio with live musicians, rather than overdubbing the vocals on top of the finished music. It also used a "greater proportion" of live first takes. Madonna recalled that it was the first time she had been in the same room as the musicians, which she considered a "more integral" approach to the music, and resulted in "more emotional [and] spontaneous" vocals. Leonard, who had experience recording with live musicians, explained the recording process: He and Madonna would write the songs, record the demos, and replace the drum machines and percussion with real musicians; they then would add background singers and guitar players. He described the process as "personal, not the product of big songwriting teams".

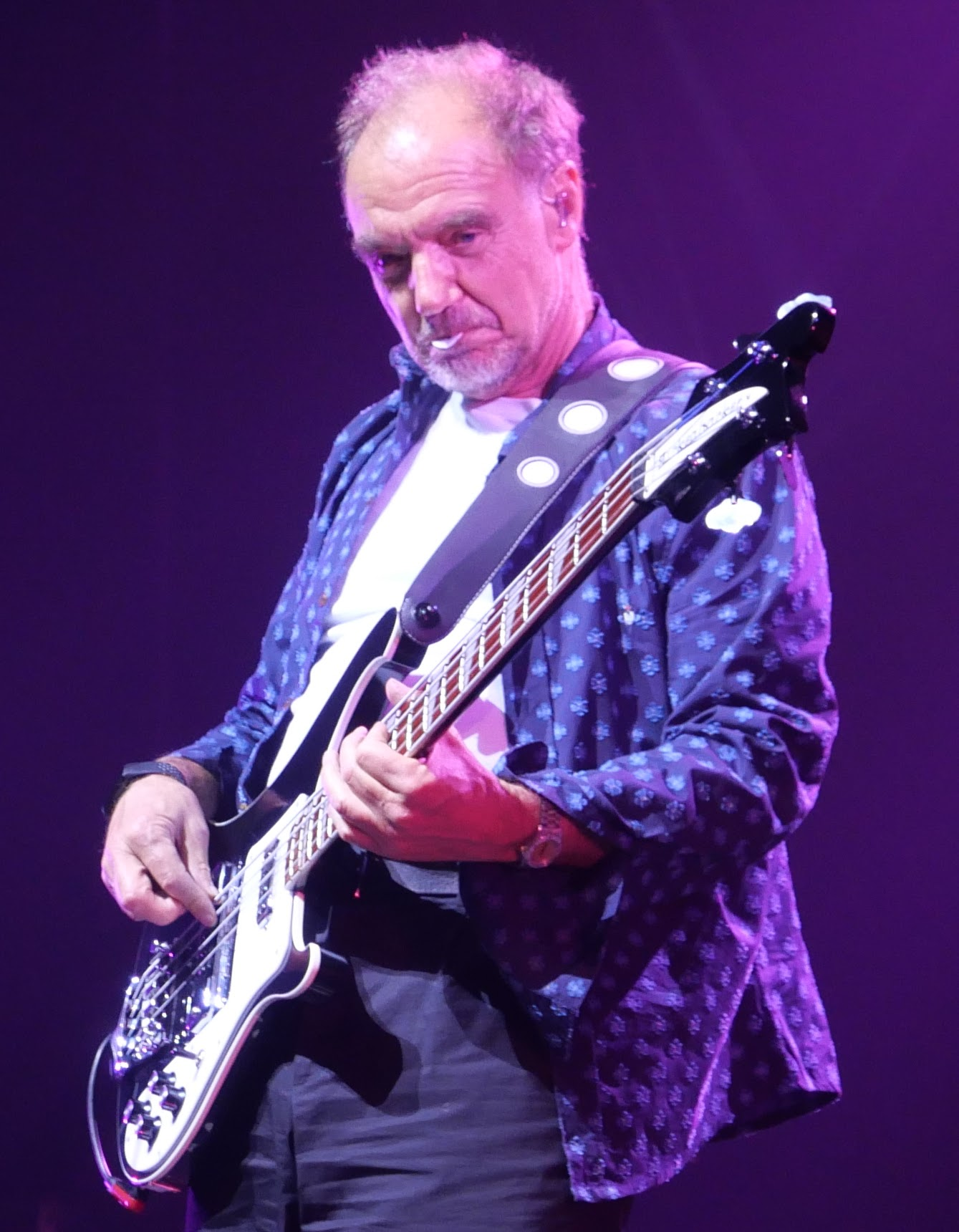
British bassist Guy Pratt (pictured in 2022) played on the title track, and other album tracks. The year before he had toured with British band Pink Floyd.

Musicians working on Like a Prayer included Bruce Gaitsch, Jonathan Moffett, Jeff Porcaro, Jain Winding, and Guy Pratt; the latter had met Leonard through his work with Bryan Ferry. The title track originally featured bongos and Latin percussion, but were quickly discarded; Madonna then decided to add a church organ and a choir. Andraé Crouch and his gospel choir, who had worked with artists like Stevie Wonder, Chaka Khan, and Quincy Jones, were hired. They accepted the offer after analyzing the lyrics; "we're very particular in choosing what we work with, and we liked what we heard", recalled Crouch. When recording, Madonna encouraged all present in the studio to "surrender themselves to passionate abandon". Leonard was asked to work on "Love Song" but, being a Prince fan, found himself shaken and "overawed"; nonetheless, he was happy to work on "Keep It Together". "Cherish" reunited Madonna with backup singers Donna De Lory and Niki Haris, with whom she worked on 1987's Who's That Girl World Tour. De Lory recalled the sessions: "[We] worked on it until we were really tight [...] [Madonna] knew exactly what she wanted and how to break it down”.

Initially planned with an orchestra, "Promise to Try" was recorded with piano and a quartet, and Madonna's "naked" voice. The orchestra was used for "Oh Father"; the singer and Leonard worked on the track in "this really dingy awful little studio" in New York's Garment District. First, they recorded Madonna's vocals; then the orchestra, and finished with double-tracking.

== Composition ==
Like a Prayer is an album that bends "classic psychedelic rock with then-current synth-pop sounds". It has been described as a pop record with rock and dance elements, with influence from acts from the 1960s and 70s such as the Beatles, Simon & Garfunkel, and Sly and the Family Stone. As Madonna's most personal and introspective album up to that point, its lyrics address, in her own words, "the influence of Catholicism on my life, and the passion it provokes in me [...] They're about an assimilation of experiences I had in my life and in relationships. They're about my mother, my father, and bonds with my family, about the pain of dying, of growing up and letting go".

Opener "Like a Prayer" is a song about a young woman "so in love with God that it is almost as though he were the male figure in her life". It is a pop rock song with elements of gospel music; a choir provides background vocals that heighten the song's spiritual nature, and a rock guitar keeps the music "dark and mysterious". The second track, "Express Yourself", is one of the album's two tributes to Sly and the Family Stone. It talks about rejecting material pleasures and only accepting the best for oneself; throughout the song, subtexts are employed. "Love Song" is a duet with Prince that begins with Madonna asking in French, "I'm ready, are you ready?". The track has been compared to the work of Eddie Kendricks and the Temptations; Prince provides "Jimmy Nolen funk guitar[s] and falsetto vocals", singing both in his upper and lower registers. Originally titled "State of Matrimony", fourth track "Till Death Do Us Part" is an "autobiographical account of [Madonna's] ill-fated marriage to Penn". It is a fast tempo track that expresses the conflict of being in love with someone who does not love themselves, and ends with the sound of wah-wah guitars and broken glass.

"Cherish"
A 30 second sample of sixth track "Cherish". As Madonna sings, drum machines, percussion and guitars back her voice.

"Promise to Try" is a moody ballad that talks about the death of Madonna's mother. The piano arrangement in the song is reminiscent of the work of Elton John, and has a cello solo toward the Bridge. In one part of the song, Madonna specifically asks: Does she hear my voice in the night when I call? Later, an adult seems to admonish a child with the lyrics, Little girl, don't you forget her face/Don't let memory play games with your mind/She's a faded smile frozen in time. The sixth track is "Cherish". Built around the themes of love and relationship, with William Shakespeare's Romeo and Juliet being one of the major inspirations, the song includes a line from "Cherish" (1966) by the Association. The lyrics present it as a simple love song, where Madonna talks about devotion and having her lover by her side, whom she would never leave. Following "Cherish" is "Dear Jessie"; according to Rikky Rooksby, the song sounds more like a children's lullaby than a pop song. The lyrics encourage the little girl Jessie to use her imagination; it summons up a psychedelic landscape, where pink elephants roam with dancing moons and mermaids. It references fairy-tale characters and creates an image of children playing with each other.

"Oh Father" is a baroque pop ballad that talks about Madonna's troubled relationship with her father Tony during her childhood. She described it as the "second half" of True Blue's "Live to Tell", and is her tribute to Simon & Garfunkel. She uses a contrast of timbre, pairing her higher, smoother voice with a lower one. In the vocal bridge, Madonna talks about the realization that her father never meant to hurt her, and why she runs away. Described as Madonna's take on Sister Sledge's "We Are Family" (1979), "Keep It Together" is the other tribute to Sly and the Family Stone; a funk-inspired number with double-tracked vocals on the refrain, she sings about the importance of family, and mentions that "blood is thicker than any circumstance". "Spanish Eyes" is a slow, somber track that features instrumentation from castanets, and revisits the Spanish vibe of 1987's "La Isla Bonita". It has been described as a "cross between Ben E. King's 'Spanish Harlem' and something by Billy Joel". Its lyrics are ambiguous and have been subject to various interpretations: AIDS, a Hispanic mother's lament over the death of her son due to gang violence, or someone going off to fight in a war. Closer "Act of Contrition" is an experimental song with psychedelic tones; it begins with a "whispered invocation" and features distorted guitar and backward tracking of a gospel choir. It has Madonna reciting the Catholic prayer of the same name, before the vocals dissolve into a monologue in which she grows obstreperous over being denied a restaurant reservation.

== Artwork and release ==
"I love blond hair, but it really does something different to you. I feel more grounded when I have dark hair, and I feel more ethereal when I have light hair. It's unexplainable. I also feel more Italian when my hair is dark".

— Madonna on dying her blonde hair dark for Like a Prayer.

For Like a Prayer, Madonna adopted a new image; she dyed her blonde hair dark, wore well-worn jeans, multiple rings on her fingers, garnet-encrusted crucifixes, a string of colored beads and glass gems around her neck. This new look was described as "very sixties" and a "cross between [a] gypsy and [a] hippie" by Mark Bego and Adam Sexton, respectively. It was Madonna's first studio album not to feature her face on the front cover. Shot by Herb Ritts, it depicts a close-up of the singer's crotch and hands; the first two buttons of her fly are undone and her fingers, adorned with rings and beads, hold down the top of her jeans. According to O'Brien, the cover was inspired by Madonna's mother, who used to cover up her Sacred Heart statue with zip-up jeans each time a woman came to visit.

Critics have compared the artwork to that of Sticky Fingers (1971) by the Rolling Stones, which shows a close-up of a male model's crotch, and Born in the U.S.A. (1984) by Bruce Springsteen. Writing for the San Francisco Examiner, Barry Walters noted that the artwork sees Madonna "virtually exposing herself", while for Attitude's Matthew Burton, "for a woman whose album and single artwork had been so inextricably linked with her face, [Like a Prayer] announced a new kind of Madonna". On CD editions, the album's back cover shows a black-and-white image of Madonna dancing with a flowing purple chiffon top, while the photograph used on the inner sleeve shows a dark-haired Madonna in a praying pose. The vinyl editions used the "praying" picture as the back cover, and the "dancing" one on the inner sleeve.

On January 24, 1989, Billboard reported that Like a Prayer would be released on February 28; The Albany Herald, however, reported the release date would be March 15. Billboard then reported on February 11 that the album would be sent to radio stations on March 17, and released four days later. Bray told The Lewiston Journal that the public would be "very surprised" at the album's personal tone; "anyone expecting to get up and boogie will be most disappointed". There were reports that label executives were "biting their nails" at how Like a Prayer would be received, but these claims were soon refuted; "it's going to be a significant album [...] sure it's deep stuff, but it's not obscure or gratuitously arty", declared Bob Merlis, publicity chief for Warner Bros. On March 2, Spain's Cadena SER managed to play three of the album's tracks: "Like a Prayer", "Love Song", and "Act of Contrition". Rafael Revert, SER's music manager, explained that the leaks did not come from WEA. Bettina Bose, general manager to WEA Spain, revealed that SER got a reel-to-reel recording from Mexico, which was copied from a raw factory tape. A similar situation occurred in Chicago: On March 15, two days before radio distribution, Ric Lippincott from Z-95 radio station began airing the album in its entirety. Warner Bros. sent the station a cease and desist and tried unsuccessfully to contact Lippincott, who revealed that he did not think it was a legitimate court order, but a "strong request" from the label. The source of the leak remained unknown.

Like a Prayer was officially released in the US on March 21, 1989, though was released a day earlier on March 20 in Europe. Initial pressings were scented with patchouli oil to give the album a "church-type feel". "[Madonna] wanted to create a flavor of the '60s and the church. She wanted to create a sensual feeling you could hear and smell", a spokesperson for Warner Bros. explained. The "final serious component" to the album was a fact sheet about safe sex and HIV/AIDS. Noting that it is an "equal opportunity disease", and that "people with AIDS – regardless of their sexual orientation – deserve compassion and support", it marked the first time a mainstream artist had ever included AIDS-related information with a commercial release. Attitude's Matthew Barton saw this as "further proof of Madonna's commitment to, and understanding of, LGBT issues". To commemorate the album's 30th anniversary, a "dedicated playlist" was made available on March 21, 2019; it included the original track list ―with the exception of "Promise to Try" and "Act of Contrition"―, remixed versions of the singles, and the previously unreleased "Supernatural".

== Promotion ==
To market the album, WEA spent over $2 million, its most expensive campaign up to that point. Promotional items included different-sized posters of the cover and the photograph of Madonna used on the inner sleeve, and badges depicting the logo. Three days before the official release, custom-made press kits with a promotional pre-release CD were sent to the media. A patchouli-scented photograph of Madonna's bare midriff with the slogans "It Shall Be Released" and "Lead Us Into Temptation" was featured in a spread in Billboard magazine. In August 1989, to promote Like a Prayer in Japan, Warner Music released an extended play titled Remixed Prayers, which included several remixes of "Like a Prayer" and "Express Yourself"; it peaked at number 24 on the Oricon chart. The EP was exclusively for Japan until December 1993, when it was released in Australia to coincide with Madonna's visit to the country with the Girlie Show concert tour. Remixed Prayers reached number 92 on the ARIA Albums Chart, where it remained for three weeks.

=== Live performance and tour ===
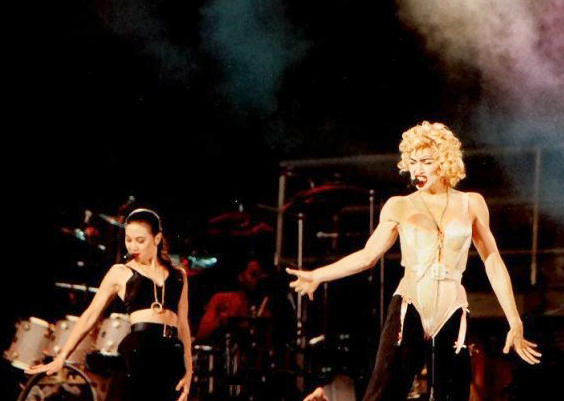
Madonna opening the Blond Ambition World Tour with a performance of the second single "Express Yourself".

On September 6, 1989, Madonna opened the MTV Video Music Awards with a performance of the second single "Express Yourself". She wore an ensemble consisting of baggy pants, a bustier and a monocle, and was joined by Donna De Lory and Niki Haris. The number began with the singer descending from a flight of stairs; she then removed her coat to reveal the bustier and, together with Haris and De Lory, performed a dance routine called voguing. The performance received positive reviews from critics; Rolling Stone named it Madonna's best, and placed it among the best opening numbers in the show's history. Author Ian Inglis singled out the "provocatively choreographed, dance production number" that went on to "highlight the 'TV' part of MTV, and in a way heralded [Madonna] and the network as a cultural arbiter".

Like a Prayer was further promoted on 1990's Blond Ambition World Tour, Madonna's third concert tour. Originally planned as the Like a Prayer World Tour, it kicked off on April 13 in Chiba, Japan, and concluded on August 5 in Nice, France. The concert was divided into five different thematic segments: Metropolis, Religious, Dick Tracy, Art Deco, and finally, an encore. The art direction was by Madonna's brother Christopher Ciccone, while the costumes were created by French fashion designer Jean-Paul Gaultier. Blond Ambition was awarded "Most Creative Stage Production award at the Pollstar Concert Industry Awards, and grossed US$62.7 million ($154.51 million in 2025 dollars). The tour was subject to controversy due to its sexual and Catholic imagery; Pope John Paul II urged the general public and the Christian community not to attend the concerts, referring to the tour as "one of the most satanic shows in the history of humanity". In Toronto, the police threatened to arrest Madonna over the performance of "Like a Virgin" (1984), which featured her simulating masturbation. Nevertheless, the show went on unaltered.

=== Singles ===
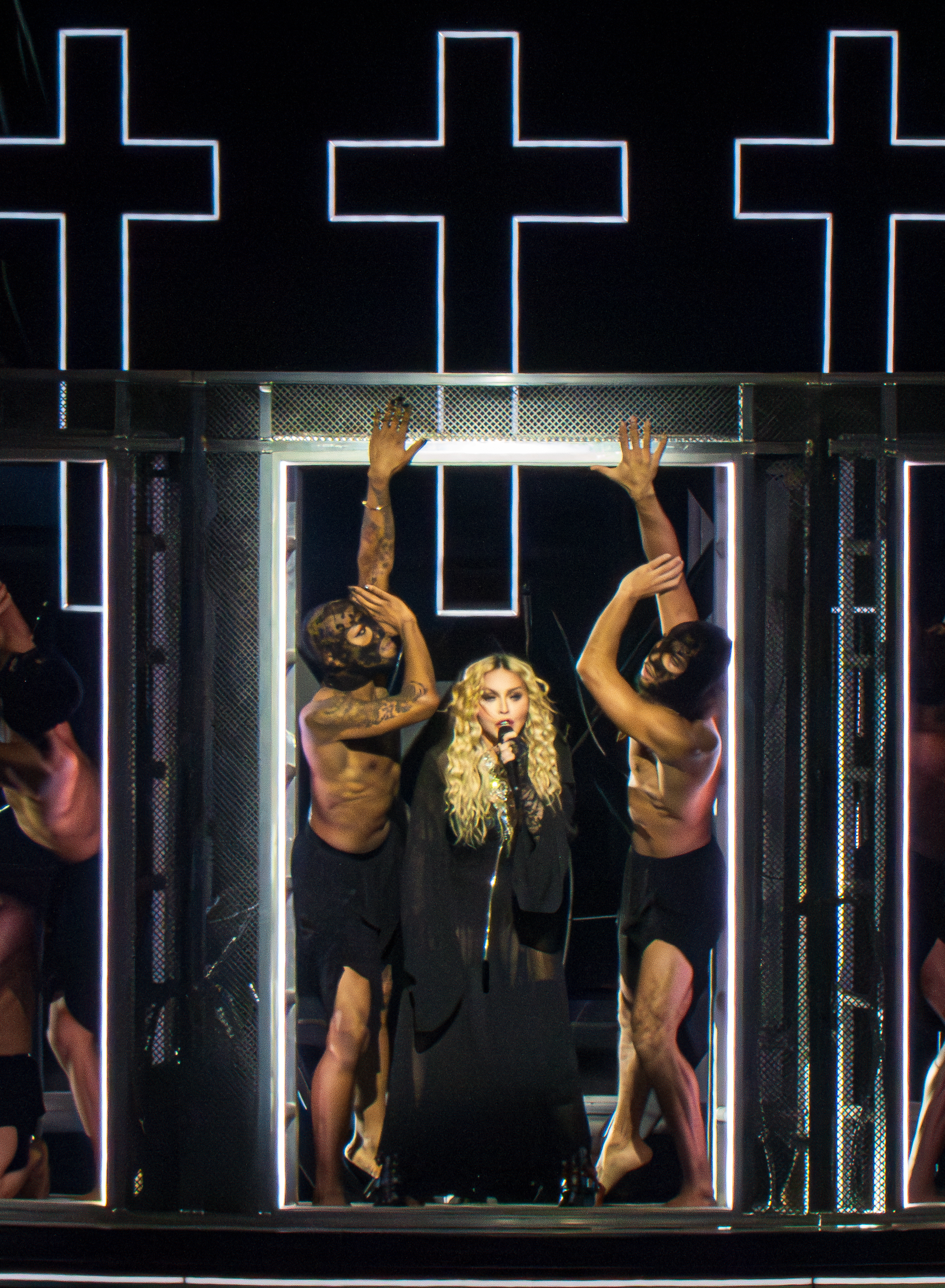
Madonna singing title track and lead single "Like a Prayer" on the Celebration Tour (2023–2024). It reached the top of the Billboard Hot 100, becoming her seventh number one there.

The title track "Like a Prayer" was released as lead single on March 3, 1989. Acclaimed by music critics, who deemed it one of Madonna's best, it became her seventh number-one single on the US Billboard Hot 100, remaining there for three consecutive weeks. It was a global success, reaching number one in Canada, Australia, Belgium, Denmark, Spain, Finland, Iceland, Ireland, Italy, Japan, Netherlands, Norway, New Zealand, Poland, Portugal, United Kingdom, Sweden and Switzerland. The accompanying music video, directed by Mary Lambert, sees Madonna with stigmata on her palms, dancing in front of burning crucifixes and praying to a crying statue of a black saint, who comes to life and seduces her. The Vatican condemned the visual, while family and religious groups protested against its broadcast.

Released on May 9, second single "Express Yourself" received positive reviews from critics, who applauded its gender equality message and deemed it a hymn to freedom and encouragement to women and oppressed minorities. Commercially, the song peaked at number 2 on the Hot 100 and topped the European Hot 100 Singles chart. David Fincher directed the music video, which was inspired by the Fritz Lang classic film Metropolis (1927). With a budget of $5 million ($12.99 million in 2025 dollars), it was the most expensive music video made at the time. The visual shows a city full of tall skyscrapers and railway lines; Madonna plays two characters: a masculine Marlene Dietrich-like persona, and a submissive wife chained half-naked to a bed. Critics noted that the video's depiction of female sexuality and Madonna's masculine image was gender-bending.

"Cherish" was released as Like a Prayer's third single on August 1, 1989. It was well received by critics, who were surprised by the change of content and the music's lighter tone in contrast to the previous singles. In the United States, the single peaked at number 2 on the Hot 100, giving Madonna the record for the most consecutive top-five singles by any act, with 16. "Cherish" topped the Adult Contemporary chart. Herb Ritts directed the music video, which depicts the singer on a beach interacting with mermen. "Oh Father" was released on October 24. It was less successful than its predecessors, peaking at number 20 on the Hot 100 and ending Madonna's streak of 16 consecutive top-five singles and 17 consecutive top-ten singles. Critics reacted positively to the track, highlighting its confessional nature. The music video, directed by Fincher, was reportedly inspired by Madonna's memories of her own mother's funeral and shows a little girl stepping up to view her mother's coffin only to find the dead woman's lips have been sewn shut.

Released on December 4, "Dear Jessie" reached the top five in the United Kingdom and Ireland; it was not released in America. Critics compared the track to the work of the Beatles. The music video combines live action and animation, portraying a young girl waking up in bed and interacting with fantasy characters. "Keep It Together" was the final single from Like a Prayer, released on January 31, 1990. In Australia, it was released on March 20 as a double A-side with "Vogue". It peaked at number 8 on the Billboard Hot 100, becoming Madonna's 18th top-ten hit in the United States, breaking the record previously held by Aretha Franklin as the female solo artist with the most top-tens in history.

== Critical reception ==
Contemporaneous reviews
Review scores
Source	Rating
Chicago Sun-Times	3.5/4 stars
Los Angeles Times	3/5 stars
NME	10/10
Q	5/5 stars
Rolling Stone	3.5/5 stars
The Village Voice	B+

Retrospective reviews and music guides
Review scores
Source	Rating
AllMusic	5/5 stars
Blender	4/5 stars
Entertainment Weekly	A
MusicHound Rock	4/5 stars
Pitchfork	9.0/10
The Rolling Stone Album Guide	5/5 stars
Spin Alternative Record Guide	10/10
Tom Hull – on the Web	A−
The Virgin Encyclopedia of Nineties Music	4/5 stars

Like a Prayer received universal acclaim from critics. AllMusic's Stephen Thomas Erlewine deemed it Madonna's "best and most consistent album", and applauded its "kaleidoscopic variety of pop styles". Barry Walters also named it the singer's best and most consistent; the author noted the record covers "more stylistic and emotional grounds" than Madonna's previous works, and goes beyond "being merely a great assembly of future singles". Walters concluded that, unlike other records from the time, Like a Prayer "truly holds together [as an album]" by "deliberately and quite effectively juxtapos[ing] moods and messages". He ended his review on a glowing note: "[This] is the album where Madonna crossed the boundary between craft and inspiration. From the start, she's had an intuitive grasp of how to put on a good show. Now she's got the guts to show us what she has inside". For Don McCleesee from the Chicago Sun-Times, "this is Madonna's best album, and for those who think that such an assertion is damning with faint praise, it's a very good album by the standards of any popular artist". In Billboard's review, Like a Prayer was named "less accessible than [Madonna's] previous efforts, but [is] ultimately her most satisfying, lyrically and musically". In the same vein, Rikky Rooksby said it was her "most engaging [and] listenable". For Blender's Tony Power, Like a Prayer is Madonna's "most touching, least strident record".

Daryl Easlea, author of Madonna: Blond Ambition, described it as a "personal work of great beauty, and one that delves deep into Madonna's soul. [It is] her most accomplished and audacious [album]". In a similar note, J. D. Considine from Rolling Stone expressed: "Daring in its lyrics, ambitious in its sonics, this is far and away the most self-consciously serious album she's made". He went on to hail Like a Prayer, "as close to art as pop music gets [...] proof not only that Madonna should be taken seriously as an artist but that hers is one of the most compelling voices of the Eighties". Slant Magazine's Sal Cinquemani said it was one of the "quintessential pop albums of all time", and highlighted its "sophisticated arrangements, deeply felt lyrics, and [Madonna]'s stronger, more assured vocals". The staff of The New York Times noted that, "[she] has never sung with more feeling". USA Today's Edna Gundersen elaborated: "Madonna's voice will never be brilliant, but she summons so much emotional intensity on Like a Prayer that the calculated come-on in Like a Virgin sounds like a disembodied chirp". In Encyclopedia Madonnica, Matthew Rettenmund singled out the "intensely personal lyrics and mature vocals".

Writing for Billboard, Kenneth Partridge considered it Madonna's "most introspective and eclectic album to date [...] funky, poignant [...] [it's] one of her most fully realized collection of songs". Jonathan Takiff from The Philadelphia Inquirer praised the album for being "serious and reflective, [and] at times heavily laden with psychic trauma. You might consider Like a Prayer to be [Madonna]'s Misfits... or her hour in the confessional box". Nick Levine from Vice referred to it as the singer's "first undisputed masterpiece", that proved she was a "meaningful artist, not just an uncommonly savvy and driven pop star. She bared her navel on the album's cover, and her soul in its songs". From Spin, John Leland perceived a "strong sense of independence" throughout the album, comparing its tracks to advice columns and adding: "Within [Like a Prayer] [...] there's a basic sense of triumph and self worth. [Madonna] expresses herself musically in ways that aren't commercial or what people would want from her [...] You won't find this sort of breadth in a Janet Jackson record". Joseph Earp from Australian website Junkee compared Like a Prayer to the work of Prince; "his purple shadow is all over [...] That's not to take [it] away from Madonna, mind you. At the end of the day, this is the kind of album that only she could release — full of sweet, gasping life, from start to finish. Who else releases a record this smart?". Maura Johnston, writing for Pitchfork, classified it as a "spectacular" album that proves "just how grand, artistic, and personal a pop star could be at the very height of her fame". Johnston also noted: "Like a Prayer showcase[s] her growth as a pop artist [...] [Madonna] takes more chances lyrically and musically, and while they don't always work, they do give a glimpse at her restlessness and increased willingness to take musical chances".

To the Los Angeles Times' Chris Willman, "her first real entry as a student in the 'confessional' school of singer/songwriters [...] Madonna's fourth is also quite a leap musically--though not always quite as great a leap as you might hope for. [...] The easy admonition of 'You can dance' has given way to 'Let the choir sing', and if [Like a Prayer] is far from a perfectly crafted transition in her development, it's a perfectly honest one". More critical was Chaz Repak from The Cavalier Daily; he applauded the "improved" songwriting, but was not convinced with the idea of a "mature Madonna", concluding: "Like a Prayer constitutes [her] best work to date. But after such work as 'Material Girl', 'Burning Up' and 'Open Your Heart', that's not saying much". From Spin, Christian Logan Wright felt that, "talking about stuff that doesn't sit well in pop music [...] [On Like a Prayer] your relationship to Madonna changes from to song to song, and it makes you uncomfortable. It's like sitting on a table with a friend who's telling too much about herself to people she doesn't know". One negative review came from The Pittsburgh Press. Peter B. King criticized the singer's vocals, lamented the lack of "catchy" songs, and wrote: "Isn't this supposed to be Madonna's much-hyped 'confessional' album? [...] As usual with [her], Like a Prayer is a lot more image than substance [...] uninspired dance-floor fodder [...] [that] goes down like flat Pepsi".

== Commercial performance ==
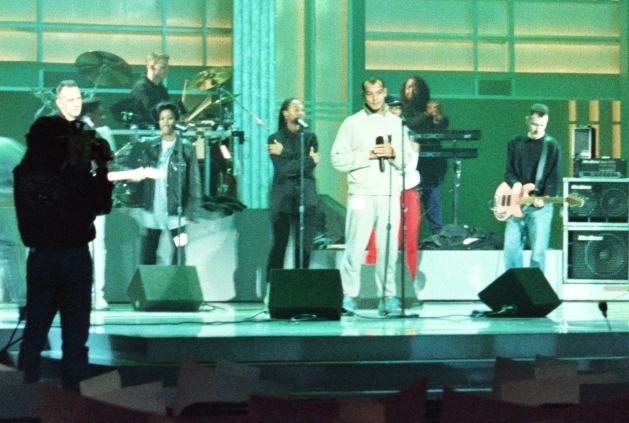
Fine Young Cannibals' The Raw & the Cooked kept Like a Prayer from reaching the first position of RPM's Albums chart.

On April 8, 1989, Like a Prayer entered the Billboard 200 at number 11. It was Madonna's third studio album in a row to enter the top ten in just two weeks. On April 22, it topped the chart. As her third consecutive number-one album after Like a Virgin and True Blue, Madonna became the first artist to top the chart with three studio albums in a row since the Rolling Stones. It took Like a Prayer just three weeks to reach number one, compared to the five weeks for True Blue and eleven weeks for Like a Virgin. It spent six weeks at the top, becoming her longest-running number-one album, and spent a total of 77 weeks on the chart. Like a Prayer was eventually certified quadruple Platinum by the Recording Industry Association of America (RIAA) for shipments of four million units in the US, and sold five million copies by March 2015. In Canada, Like a Prayer debuted at number 11 on the RPM Albums Chart on April 1. Almost one month later, it peaked at number 2 behind The Raw & the Cooked by Fine Young Cannibals. Like a Prayer was the fourth best-selling album of 1989 in Canada, and was certified five times Platinum by the Canadian Recording Industry Association (CRIA) for shipments of 500,000 copies. It reached number one in Argentina and became one of the best-selling international albums in Brazil, with over 700,000 units sold as of October 1993.

In the United Kingdom, the album debuted at number one on the Albums chart on April 1, 1989; it remained there for two weeks and spent a total of 73 weeks on the chart. It was certified quadruple Platinum by the British Phonographic Industry (BPI) for shipments of 1.2 million copies and, as of June 2019, was Madonna's fourth best-seller in the country. Like a Prayer also topped the albums chart in France; in July 1989, it was certified Platinum by the Syndicat National de l'Édition Phonographique (SNEP) for shipments of 300,000 copies, and once again in 2001 for shipments of 600,000 copies. Across Europe, Like a Prayer topped the charts in Belgium, Finland, Denmark, Switzerland, Portugal and Spain. In Belgium, it ended as one of the top five best-selling international albums of 1989. In Germany, the album was certified three times Gold by the Bundesverband Musikindustrie (BVMI) for having shipped over 750,000 copies. Over 800,000 copies have been sold in Italy as of 2019. Like a Prayer topped the European Top 100 Albums chart; by May 1990, it had sold 5 million copies in Europe, with 3 million sold in its first four months of release.

In Japan, Like a Prayer reached number one on the Oricon Albums Chart, and remained on the chart for 22 weeks. At the 1990 Japan Gold Disc Awards held by the Recording Industry Association of Japan (RIAJ), Madonna won three awards for Best Album of the Year – Pops Solo, Grand Prix Album of the Year, and Grand Prix Artist of the Year; the last two were given for the best-selling international album and the best-selling international artist of the year, respectively. Like a Prayer was Madonna's sixth Platinum album in Hong Kong. In Malaysia, it sold 23,000 units on its first day alone. With 60,000 copies sold in three months, Like a Prayer is one of WEA Singapore's all-time best-sellers. In Australia, the album debuted and peaked at number 4 on April 2, 1989, spending a total of 49 weeks on the ARIA albums chart. It was the sixth best-selling album of the year, and was certified quadruple Platinum by the Australian Recording Industry Association (ARIA) for shipments of 280,000 copies. In New Zealand, the album peaked at number 2 behind Watermark by Enya, and was certified double Platinum by the Recorded Music NZ for shipments of 30,000 copies. Like a Prayer has sold over 15 million copies worldwide.

== Legacy ==
"The critical and commercial reception of Like a Prayer made it clear that Madonna was now working on a different level than back when she was merely a pop superstar. She now had the 'serious' critics on her side, and the crossover potential not only to sell millions but to create some lasting cultural impact".

— Author Daryl Easlea on Like a Prayer.

According to Entertainment Weekly's Nicholas Fonseca, Like a Prayer marked an "official turning point" in Madonna's career, as it earned her "a long-awaited, substantive dose of critical acclaim". Similarly, the BBC's Mark Savage noted that it was the moment when critics first began to consider Madonna "an artist, rather than a mere pop singer", and VH1's Christopher Rosa said the album helped the singer evolve from "bubbly pop act to a serious artist", earning universal acclaim for arguably the first time in her career. According to author Julia Holt, Like a Prayer "made [Madonna's] critics eat their words". Kenneth G. Bielen, in The Lyrics of Civility: Biblical Images and Popular Music Lyrics in American Culture, wrote: "Five years earlier, [Madonna] was a dance-pop 'Boy-Toy'. With Like a Prayer, she proved she was an artist who could think with more than her body". For Annie Zaleski, it is the singer's "first truly substantial" album that separated her "chirpy club-kid days" from the "mature sounds and themes" she would go on to explore in the 1990s. She concluded that, "the album's themes of religious and sexual oppression still feel all too relevant. Madonna dictated pop's future direction while also being firmly in control of her own fortunes". In the same vein, Thomas Harrison documented that Madonna "pushed boundaries" by addressing "uncomfortable song topics" in Like a Prayer.

Writing for The Guardian, Lucy O'Brien expressed that, by "dismantling old Catholic patriarchal messages [Madonna] created a concept album, moving from pop stardom to artistry". To the staff of The Advocate, "True Blue started changing minds about Madonna, but [Like a Prayer] confirmed [she] was here to stay". Pitchfork's Cameron Cook wrote that Madonna "reshaped the role of "pop star"" with Like a Prayer, also adding that it is the record where she "not only earned her crown as the Queen of Pop, but rightfully established herself as the Mother of Reinvention". Sal Cinquemani concluded: "By the late '80s, Madonna was already one of the biggest pop stars of all time, but with Like a Prayer, she became one of the most important". From NPR, Laura Rydell said the album led the way for a new generation of female pop singers to "express themselves", to which Liza Lentino from Spin added that, "[Madonna] lit a blowtorch and poured taboo-based gasoline on restrictions for women in music". VH1's Christopher Rossa held that Like a Prayer was the first record to "evoke what female artists explore today: sexuality, religion, gender equality and independence".

"The magnum opus of her first decade and arguably her defining creative statement [...] with Like a Prayer, Madonna established that she was a pop star who happened to come from the '80s, not a product of the '80s — and that she would remain relevant long after her peers faded into memory like a Rubik's Cube or Teddy Ruxpin".

— Joe Lynch from Billboard commenting on Like a Prayer and its impact.

Writing for NME, El Hunt noted influence of Like a Prayer in the work of contemporary female artists such as Christine and the Queens, Rihanna, and Ariana Grande. Singer Taylor Swift stated that with the album, Madonna made "the most incredible, bold, risky, decisions as far as pop music goes", calling the title track "legitimately one of the greatest pop songs of all time". Rossa went on to say that, "[Like a Prayer] was pioneering, and no woman in music has come close to doing something as groundbreaking", and will always be "more influential" than other "iconic" female albums like Blackout (2007), The Fame Monster (2009), and Beyoncé (2013). Nick Levine added:

"[Like a Prayer] is a rare beast: an iconic pop album that retains its ability to surprise you, using richly evocative songcraft to explore deeply personal themes—sometimes spiritual, sometimes socially conscious—from a woman's perspective. With it, Madonna had once again remodeled people's expectations of what a female pop singer could achieve. Decades before Beyoncé's Lemonade and Ariana Grande's Thank U, Next, it laid the foundation for the deeply personal pop blockbuster, auteured by a strong woman at the peak of her creative powers".

Like a Prayer is often referred to as one of the greatest albums of the 1980s and of all time. In 2003, Rolling Stone named it the 237th greatest of all time; nine years later, it dropped to the 239th position on the magazine's revisited list. Finally, in 2020, it was placed at number 331. Slant Magazine included it on their 2003 list of 50 Essential Pop Albums. In a 2005 poll conducted by Channel 4, Like a Prayer was voted the eighth-greatest album in music history. That same year, it was included among the 1001 Albums You Must Hear Before You Die, where it was named the "most spectacular" pop album since the Beatles' Revolver (1966). Time deemed it one of the 100 "greatest and most influential musical compilations since 1954". In 2024, Apple Music ranked Like a Prayer 77th on their 100 Best Albums list. Like a Prayer was featured in the book Spin Alternative Record Guide, where it was given a perfect score of 10/10 by reviewer Rob Sheffield; this score is given to albums considered "unimpeachable" masterpieces or "flawed record[s] of crucial historical significance". It is also considered one of the greatest albums ever made by a woman. In 2015, Billboard named it Madonna's best studio album that "continues to inspire decades later, and remains [her] thrilling high-water mark". From The National, Saeed Saeed also named it the singer's best, adding that, although "[Madonna] went on to release more adventurous material, nothing beats the pure thrills found in this landmark release". Taraborrelli wrote that, "every important artist has at least one album in his or her career whose critical and commercial success becomes the artist's magic moment", for Madonna, it was Like a Prayer.

== Track listing ==
=== Original version ===
All tracks are written by and produced by Madonna and Patrick Leonard, except where noted.

Like a Prayer track listing
No.	Title	Writer(s)	Producer(s)	Length
1.	"Like a Prayer"			5:41
2.	"Express Yourself"	Madonna; Stephen Bray	Madonna; Bray	4:39
3.	"Love Song" (duet with Prince)	Madonna; Prince	Madonna; Prince	4:52
4.	"Till Death Do Us Part"			5:16
5.	"Promise to Try"			4:21
6.	"Cherish"			5:03
7.	"Dear Jessie"			4:20
8.	"Oh Father"			4:57
9.	"Keep It Together"	Madonna; Bray	Madonna; Bray	5:03
10.	"Spanish Eyes"			5:15
11.	"Act of Contrition"			2:19
Total length:				51:16

=== 30th anniversary version ===
Like a Prayer track listing
No.	Title	Length
1.	"Like a Prayer" (12" Dance Mix; remixed by Shep Pettibone)	7:52
2.	"Express Yourself" (Non-stop Express Remix; remixed by Pettibone)	8:00
3.	"Love Song" (duet with Prince)	4:42
4.	"Till Death Do Us Part"	5:18
5.	"Cherish" (extended version)	6:16
6.	"Dear Jessie"	4:21
7.	"Oh Father" (single version)	4:27
8.	"Keep It Together" (12" remix; remixed by Pettibone)	7:48
9.	"Spanish Eyes"	5:17
10.	"Supernatural"	5:12
Total length:		59:23

Notes

- On certain editions of the album, "Spanish Eyes" is listed as "Pray for Spanish Eyes".

== Personnel ==
Credits adapted from the album's liner notes.

Musicians

- Madonna – lead vocals, backing vocals, additional synthesizers
- Patrick Leonard – acoustic piano, Hammond B3 organ, clavinet, synthesizers
- Stephen Bray – synthesizers
- Jai Winding – synthesizers
- Geary Lanier – clavinet
- Prince – guitars, vocals
- Bruce Gaitsch – guitars, acoustic guitar
- Dann Huff – guitars
- Chester Kamen – guitars
- David Williams – guitars
- Russ Powell - guitars
- Marcos Loya – requinto guitar, backing vocals
- Randy Jackson – bass
- Guy Pratt – bass
- Jonathan Moffett – drums
- Jeff Porcaro – drums
- John Robinson – drums
- Luis Conte – percussion
- Paulinho da Costa – percussion
- Joe Porcaro – marimba
- Sandra Crouch – tambourine
- David Boruff – brass section
- Dick Hyde – brass section
- Chuck Findley – brass section, horn arrangements
- Steven Madaio – brass section
- Joe Mayer – French horn
- Richard Todd – French horn
- Larry Corbett – concertmaster
- Bill Meyers – string arrangements and conductor
- Suzie Katayama – cello
- The Andraé Crouch Choir – backing vocals
- Rose Banks – backing vocals
- Donna De Lory – backing vocals
- Lynne Fiddmont – backing vocals
- Niki Haris – backing vocals
- Marilyn Martin – backing vocals
- Ali Nadirah – backing vocals

Production and design

- Madonna – producer
- Patrick Leonard – producer
- Stephen Bray – producer
- Prince – producer
- Bill Bottrell – sound engineer, mixing
- Heidi Hanschu – sound engineer
- Eddie Miller – sound engineer
- Stephen Shelton – sound engineer
- Michael Vail Blum – additional engineer
- Stacy Baird – assistant engineer
- Robert Salcedo – assistant engineer
- Joe Schiff – assistant engineer
- Bob Ludwig – mastering at Masterdisk (New York City, New York)
- John Good – drum technician
- Harry McCarthy – drum technician
- Ivy Skoff – production coordinator
- Herb Ritts – photography
- Jeri Heiden – art direction
- Margo Chase – logo design
- Freddy DeMann – management
- Melissa Crow – management
- Elisa Lane – management

== Charts ==
=== Weekly charts ===
Weekly chart performance for Like a Prayer
Chart (1989)	Peak position
Argentine Albums (CAPIF)	1
Australian Albums (ARIA)	4
Austrian Albums (Ö3 Austria)	1
Belgian Albums (IFPI – SIBESA)	1
Brazil Albums	3
Canada Top Albums/CDs (RPM)	2
Canadian Albums (The Record)	1
Danish Albums (IFPI)	1
Dutch Albums (Album Top 100)	1
European Top 100 Albums (Music & Media)	1
Finnish Albums (Suomen virallinen lista)	1
French Albums (SNEP)	1
German Albums (Offizielle Top 100)	1
Greek Albums (IFPI Greece)	1
Icelandic Albums (Tónlist)	1
Irish Albums (IFPI)	2
Italian Albums (Musica e dischi)	1
Japanese Albums (Oricon)	1
New Zealand Albums (RMNZ)	2
Norwegian Albums (VG-lista)	1
Portuguese Albums (AFP)	1
Spanish Albums (PROMUSICAE)	1
Swedish Albums (Sverigetopplistan)	1
Swiss Albums (Schweizer Hitparade)	1
UK Albums (Official Charts)	1
US Billboard 200	1
US Top R&B/Hip-Hop Albums (Billboard)	55

Chart (1995)	Peak position
Scottish Albums (Official Charts)	63

Chart (2021–2026)	Peak position
Croatian International Albums (HDU)	10
Hungarian Albums (MAHASZ)	25
Japanese Top Albums Sales (Billboard Japan)	81

Chart performance for Remixed Prayers
Chart (1989–1993)	Peak position
Australian Albums (ARIA)	92
Japanese Albums (Oricon)	24

=== Year-end charts ===
Year-end chart performance for Like a Prayer
Chart (1989)	Position
Australian Albums (ARIA)	6
Austrian Albums (Ö3 Austria)	7
Belgian Albums (IFPI – SIBESA)	4
Canada Top Albums/CDs (RPM)	4
Dutch Albums (Album Top 100)	7
European Top 100 Albums (Music & Media)	4
French Albums (SNEP)	19
German Albums (Offizielle Top 100)	5
Italian Albums (Musica e dischi)	5
Japanese Albums (Oricon)	25
New Zealand Albums (RMNZ)	14
Norwegian Albums (VG-lista)	10
Spanish Albums (PROMUSICAE)	3
Swiss Albums (Schweizer Hitparade)	5
UK Albums (OCC)	9
US Billboard 200	12

Chart (1990)	Position
US Billboard 200	94

== Certifications and sales ==
Certifications for Like a Prayer, with pure sales where available
Region	Certification	Certified units/sales
Argentina (CAPIF)	Platinum	270,000
Australia (ARIA)	4× Platinum	280,000^{^}
Austria (IFPI Austria)	Platinum	50,000^{*}
Brazil (Pro-Música Brasil)	2× Platinum	710,000
Canada (Music Canada)	5× Platinum	500,000^{^}
Finland (Musiikkituottajat)	Platinum	70,818
France (SNEP)	2× Platinum	800,000
Germany (BVMI)	3× Gold	750,000^{^}
Hong Kong (IFPI Hong Kong)	Platinum	20,000^{*}
India	—	41,000
Israel	—	20,000
Italy	—	800,000
Japan (RIAJ)	2× Platinum	414,390
Malaysia	—	30,000
Netherlands (NVPI)	Platinum	100,000^{^}
New Zealand (RMNZ)	2× Platinum	30,000^{^}
Norway	—	74,206
Portugal (AFP)	Gold	20,000^{^}
Singapore	—	82,000<
Spain (Promusicae)	4× Platinum	400,000^{^}
Switzerland (IFPI Switzerland)	2× Platinum	100,000^{^}
Turkey	—	151,000
United Kingdom (BPI)	4× Platinum	1,200,000^{^}
United States (RIAA)	4× Platinum	5,000,000
Summaries
Europe Sales as of 1990	—	5,000,000
Worldwide	—	15,000,000
^{*} Sales figures based on certification alone.^{^} Shipments figures based on certification alone.

== See also ==
- List of best-selling albums by women
- List of best-selling albums in Brazil
- List of best-selling albums in Europe
- List of best-selling albums in Turkey
- List of Australian chart achievements and milestones
- List of Billboard 200 number-one albums of 1989
- List of UK Albums Chart number ones of the 1980s
- List of number-one hits of 1989 (Germany)

== Bibliography ==
- Andersen, Christian (1991). Madonna: Unauthorized. Simon & Schuster. ISBN 0-671-73532-2.
- Bego, Mark (2000). Madonna: Blonde Ambition. Cooper Square Press. ISBN 978-0-8154-1051-5.
- Bernard, James; Marsh, Dave (1994). The New Book of Rock Lists. Touchstone. ISBN 978-0-671-78700-4.
- Bielen, Kenneth G. (1999). The Lyrics of Civility: Biblical Images and Popular Music Lyrics in American Culture. Routledge. ISBN 0-8153-3193-2.
- Bronson, Fred (2003). The Billboard Book of Number 1 Hits. Billboard Books. ISBN 0-8230-7677-6.
- Ciccone, Christopher; Leigh, Wendy (2008). Life with My Sister Madonna. Simon & Schuster. ISBN 978-1-4165-8762-0.
- Clerk, Carol (2002). Madonnastyle. Music Sales Group. ISBN 0-7119-8874-9.
- Cross, Mary (2007). Madonna: A Biography. Greenwood Publishing Group. ISBN 978-0-313-33811-3.
- Dimery, Robert (2005). 1001 Albums You Must Hear Before You Die. Cassell. ISBN 1-84403-392-9.
- Dunn, Leslie C.; Jones, Nancy A. (1994). Embodied Voices: Representing Female Vocality in Western Culture. Cambridge University Press. ISBN 0-521-46012-3.
- Easlea, Daryl (2012). Madonna: Blond Ambition. Backbeat Books. ISBN 978-1-61713-034-2.
- Fouz-Hernández, Santiago; Jarman-Ivens, Freeya (2004). Madonna's Drowned Worlds. Ashgate Publishing. ISBN 0-7546-3372-1.
- Gnojewski, Carol (2008). Madonna: Express Yourself. Enslow Publishing. ISBN 978-0-7660-2442-7.
- Guilbert, Georges-Claude (2002). Madonna as Postmodern Myth. McFarland. ISBN 0-7864-1408-1.
- Harrison, Thomas (2011). Music of the 1980s: American History Through Music. Greenwood Publishing Group. ISBN 978-0-313-36599-7.
- Holt, Julia (1998). Madonna. Hodder & Stoughton. ISBN 0-340-71150-7.
- Inglis, Ian (2006). Performance and Popular Music: History, Place and Time. Ashgate Publishing. ISBN 978-1-4094-9354-9.
- James, David (1991). Madonna: Her Complete Story: An Unauthorized Biography. Publications International, Ltd. ISBN 0-451-82240-4.
- Metz, Allen; Benson, Carol (1999). The Madonna Companion: Two Decades of Commentary. Music Sales Group. ISBN 978-0-8256-7194-4.
- O'Brien, Lucy (2007). Madonna: Like an Icon. Bantam Press. ISBN 978-0-593-05547-2.
- Rettenmund, Matthew (1995). Encyclopedia Madonnica. St. Martin's Press. ISBN 0-312-11782-5.
- Rooksby, Rikky (2004). The Complete Guide to the Music of Madonna. Omnibus Press. ISBN 0-7119-9883-3.
- Sexton, Adam (1993). Desperately Seeking Madonna: In Search of the Meaning of the World's Most Famous Woman. Random Penguin. ISBN 0-307-48374-6.
- Taraborrelli, Randy J. (2002). Madonna: An Intimate Biography. Simon & Schuster. ISBN 0-7432-2880-4.
- Voller, Debbi (1991). Madonna: The Style Book. Omnibus Press. ISBN 0-7119-7511-6.
- Weisbard, Eric; Marks, Craig (1995). "Madonna". Spin Alternative Record Guide. Vintage Books. ISBN 0-679-75574-8.
- Zollo, Paul (1991). Songwriters on Songwriting. Writer's Digest Books. ISBN 0-89879-451-X.
- Madonna: The Rolling Stone Files. Hyperion Press. 1997. ISBN 0-7868-8154-2.
