= Dear Jessie =

1989 single by Madonna

Single by Madonna

from the album Like a Prayer
- B-side: "Till Death Do Us Part"
- Released: December 4, 1989
- Recorded: 1988
- Studio: Johnny Yuma (Burbank, California)
- Genre: Baroque pop; psychedelic pop
- Length: 4:20
- Label: Sire; Warner Bros.
- Songwriters: Madonna; Patrick Leonard
- Producers: Madonna; Patrick Leonard

Madonna singles chronology
"Oh Father" (1989)	"Dear Jessie" (1989)	"Keep It Together" (1990)

Music video
- "Dear Jessie" on YouTube

"Dear Jessie" is a song by American singer Madonna from her fourth studio album Like a Prayer (1989). It was released as the fifth single from the album on December 4, 1989, by Sire Records. Written and produced by Madonna and Patrick Leonard, the song was inspired by Leonard's daughter Jessie. The release of "Dear Jessie" was limited to the United Kingdom, certain other European countries, Australia and Japan. The track is composed more like a children's lullaby rather than a pop song, and features strings, synthesizer and strummed acoustics. A change in tempo occurs during the breakdown, where instrumentation from trumpets is included. Lyrically, the song evokes a psychedelic fantasy landscape, in which pink elephants roam with dancing moons and mermaids.

Upon its release, "Dear Jessie" received mixed reviews from critics, who felt that the fantasy imagery of the song was overdone, but complimented its composition. Other reviewers likened the song to the music of the Beatles. The track was a moderate success commercially, reaching the top 5 in the United Kingdom and Ireland and the top 20 in Germany, Spain and Switzerland. The music video of "Dear Jessie" combines live action and animation, portraying a young girl waking up in bed and interacting with fantasy characters. Madonna appears in the video only as an animated, Tinker Bell-type fairy.

== Background ==
When Madonna started work on her fourth studio album, Like a Prayer in 1988, she was in an emotional state of mind following her split from Sean Penn, her 30th birthday and unfavorable reviews for her acting endeavors. She had certain personal matters on her mind that she thought could be the musical direction of the album. As Madonna considered her alternatives, producers Patrick Leonard and Stephen Bray experimented with instrumental tracks and musical ideas for her consideration.

One day, while recording of the title track was going on at Johnny Yuma Studios, Leonard went to pick up his daughter Jessie from school. Since his wife was out of town, he brought Jessie to the studio. Madonna, who was initially angry with Leonard for his late arrival, struck up a rapport with Jessie. She commented: "It was like as if I was my mother and [she] was me. We were playing in our backyard again." Witnessing their connection, Leonard approached Madonna with a song he had written for his daughter, titled "Dear Jessie". Madonna changed some of the lyrics and agreed to record the track for Like a Prayer; it was finished within the next three days.

"Dear Jessie" was released as the fourth single from Like a Prayer in Europe, while it served as the fifth single from the album in Australia and Japan; it was never released in the United States. The single cover used a photo from 1987, taken by Herb Ritts. It showed Madonna in bed, clutching a bed sheet to her bosom and sporting a pair of Minnie Mouse ears. The photo was a reference to the early criticism of Madonna's work, when reviewers had described her voice as "Minnie Mouse on helium".

== Composition ==
Dear Jessie
A 26–second sample of "Dear Jessie" where Madonna sings the chorus. It illustrates the string arrangement, and the second set of vocals interwoven with those of Madonna's, singing the words "La-la" in repetition. The sample ends with the strummed acoustics starting in the second verse.

According to Rikky Rooksby, author of The Complete Guide to the Music of Madonna, "Dear Jessie" sounds more like a children's lullaby than a pop song. A baroque pop and psychedelic pop song, it begins with the sound of strings, ushering a joyous melody, with Madonna singing in a full voice. The verses are sung without any background vocals to accompany Madonna's voice. However, in the chorus, when she sings the lines, "Pink elephants and lemonades, Dear Jessie hear the laughter raining on your love-parade", a different set of vocals are interwoven with hers, continuously chanting the words "La-la". Synthesizer and strummed acoustics are added during the second verse, followed by the repetition of the chorus, when a change in tempo and time signature occurs, followed by the sound of a child's laughter.

As Madonna finishes singing the intermediate lines, "Close your eyes, sleepy-head, It is time for your bed, Never forget what I said, Hang on...", a trumpet starts playing alongside the main rhythm. The breakdown has the feel of Spanish music, with the glissando evoking the string arrangements. This is followed by the bridge and the chorus being repeated twice. "Dear Jessie" ends with all instrumentation and vocals fading out, except the orchestra, which is equalized to make it sound very thin and trebly, as if coming out from a distorted radio. The lyrics encourage the young girl Jessie to use her imagination. It summons up a psychedelic landscape, where pink elephants roam with dancing moons and mermaids. It references fairy-tale characters and creates an image of children playing with each other.

According to the sheet music published by Warner/Chappell Music, "Dear Jessie" is written in the time signature of common time, with a tempo of 120 beats per minute. Normally written in 4/4, the song has a change in time signature after the second chorus, changing it to 3/4. It is composed in the key of D major, with Madonna's voice ranging from C_{3} to D_{5}. The song's chord progression follows a sequence of Bm–A–Bm–D–A in the verses and changes to D–Bm–G–A–D in the chorus.

== Critical reception ==
Author Santiago Fouz-Hernández commented in his book Madonna's Drowned Worlds that to him the song felt like a trepiditation of Madonna's thoughts about what might be termed "girlhood" and on a broadscale, on femininity. Christopher P. Andersen, author of Madonna: Unauthorized, described "Dear Jessie" as "a wistfully psychedelic confection of carousels and pink elephants", adding that "the song harkens back to the lullabies your mother must have sang to you". Robin Anne Reid, author of Women in Science Fiction and Fantasy: Overviews, complimented the fact that "although the sort of fantasies that [Madonna] conjures might trend towards the kinky and sexual, she can also delve into a world of mermaids, fountains of youth, leprechauns and magic lanterns as is evident by 'Dear Jessie'."

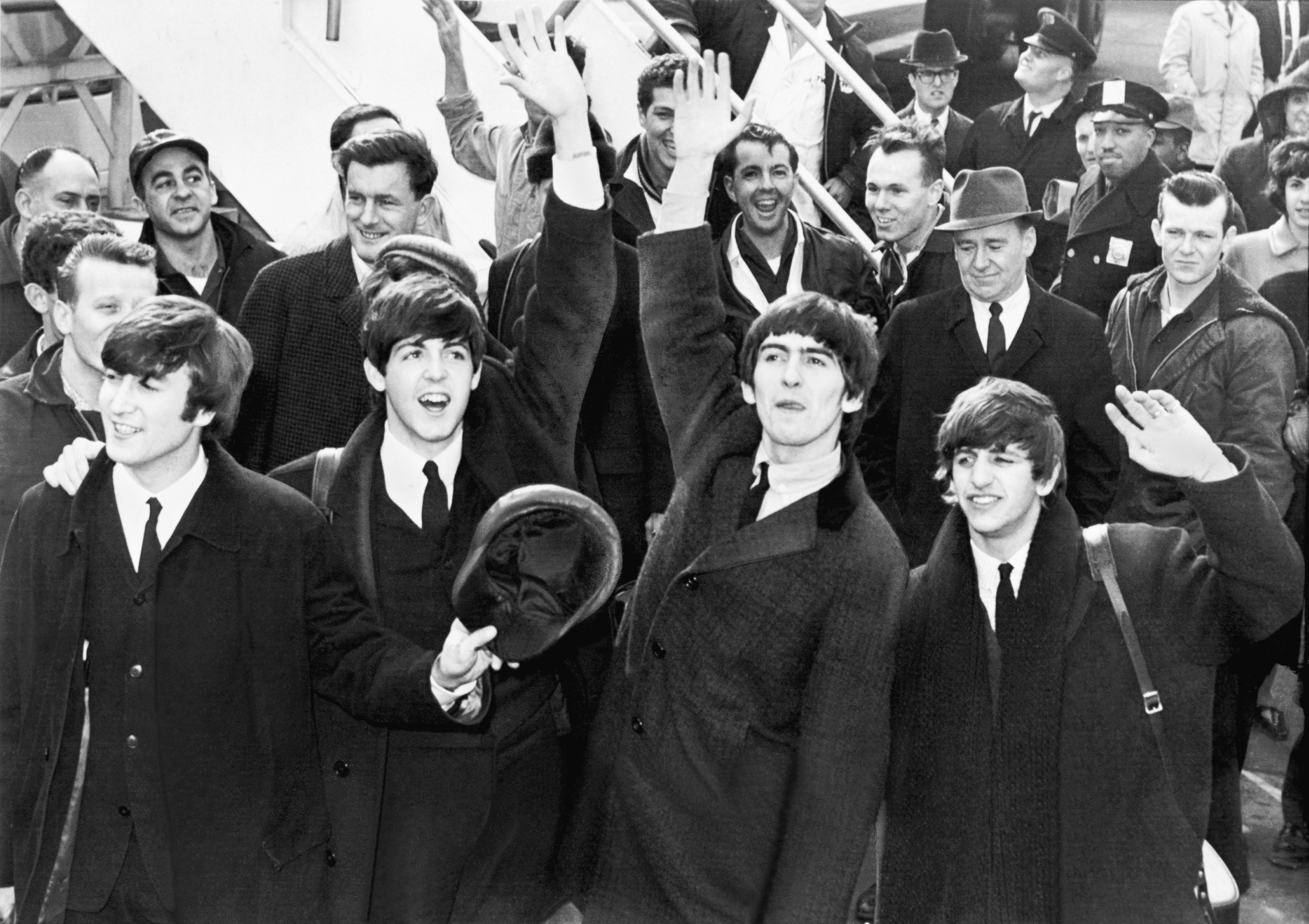
"Dear Jessie" has been compared by reviewers to work of the Beatles.

Lucy O'Brien, author of Madonna: Like an Icon, characterized the song as "harkening back to a childlike innocence", but felt that Madonna overdid the elaborate fantasy imagery. O'Brien preferred Madonna's later attempts to sing lullaby-like songs on her albums Bedtime Stories (1994) and American Life (2003). Edna Gunderson from USA Today called the song a "sugary lullaby", while opining that it would not go down as one of Madonna's well-remembered songs. The Chicago Tribune's Ian Blair described the track as "bouncy" and praised the soothing quality of the music's composition. Richard Harrington from The Washington Post deduced that with the song, Madonna was harkening back to her own maternal emotions, the feelings she could not receive from her own mother, due to her untimely death. Reviewing the Like a Prayer album, Mike Mentos from Los Angeles Daily News was not impressed with "Dear Jessie" and commented that "Madonna's voice possesses neither the control, power nor emotion to carry neo-baroque experiments like 'Dear Jessie' and 'Oh Father'." Sal Cinquemani from Slant Magazine called it a "bittersweet reminder of the ephemerality of our innocence and imagination [...] this non-U.S. single is a testament to the magic of Madonna’s collaboration with composer/producer Patrick Leonard".

A number of reviewers have compared "Dear Jessie" to the work of the Beatles. Allen Metz, one of the authors of The Madonna Companion: Two Decades of Commentary, described the composition of the song as "pastel-pretty, [and] richly orchestrated". He felt that the song would have fit better on the Beatles' 1969 soundtrack album, Yellow Submarine. The Beatles' influence was also noted by Stephen Holden from The New York Times, who labeled "Dear Jessie" a "stylish swatch of late Beatles-style psychedelia". Joey Levy from Spin characterized "Dear Jessie" as "amazing", describing his reaction to the song as "Wow! This is neat!" He added that the song sounded like Prince singing for the Beatles' 1967 album Sgt. Pepper's Lonely Hearts Club Band. Kevin Phinney from the Austin American-Statesman compared the song to the solo work that Beatles' member John Lennon did later in his career. Phinney wondered how Madonna was able to come up with the song, since most of the tracks from Like a Prayer are full of innuendo and double meanings.

== Chart performance ==
In the United Kingdom, "Dear Jessie" debuted at number nine on the UK Singles Chart, for the issue dated December 16, 1989. After two weeks, it reached a peak position of number five on the chart, staying there for another two weeks. It was present on the UK Singles Chart for a total of nine weeks, and was certified silver by the British Phonographic Industry (BPI) for shipment of 200,000 copies of the single. According to Official Charts Company, the song has sold 255,000 copies in the UK as of August 2008. In Australia, the song reached number 51 on the ARIA Singles Chart, remaining there for two consecutive weeks. On the international chart for Japan, "Dear Jessie" reached the top 40, but could not move up above number 25. In Germany, the song reached a peak of number 19 on the chart, but it remained within the German Top 100 for a total of 19 weeks. In Ireland, the song reached a peak of number three, remaining on the chart for a total of six weeks. The song failed to reach the top 20 in Austria, and was present on the chart for two weeks. It also failed to reach the top ten in Spain and Switzerland, reaching a peak of number 17 and number 16, respectively. "Dear Jessie" entered the Dutch Top 40 at number 37, ultimately reaching a peak of number 25. On the Pan-Eurochart Hot 100 Singles, compiled by Music & Media, "Dear Jessie" peaked at number nine.

== Music video ==
The music video was produced by Animation City, an animation company in London, England, and was directed by Derek Hayes. The video is mainly animated and does not feature Madonna, except as the cartoon fairy Tinker Bell. Along with Hayes, there were six animators who worked on creating the fantasy imagery. It was included on the 1990 promotional-only video compilation She's Breathless.

The video opens with a shot of a young girl sleeping in her bed. As the music starts, rays of light emanate from the bedside radio with cartoon violins playing the music. The sun rises inside a picture on the wall and the girl wakes and starts playing with her doll. A fairy goes around tapping all her toys on the floor and a large, golden teapot comes alive and shoots a rainbow from its spout. A cartoon version of the girl then slides along the rainbow and, interpreting the lyrics of the song, catches a falling star and rides over the moon.

By the second verse, pink elephants float over the girl's bed and an animated fairy version of Madonna emerges from the picture and winks. She takes the girl through another picture, displaying mythological and fairytale beings such as dragons, princes and unicorns as well as a castle where Madonna dances with the moon. An underwater scene with mermaids and fish follows, then a parade of all the girl's toys around her room. As the song wraps, the fairy taps on the girl and causes her to yawn. She falls asleep again and her toys go back to being as they were. The violins and the instruments gradually fade inside the radio and the song ends.

== Track listing and formats ==
- UK 7-inch single and 7-inch picture disc
1. "Dear Jessie" (LP version) – 4:20
2. "Till Death Do Us Part" (LP version) – 5:09
- UK 12-inch and CD single
1. "Dear Jessie" (LP version) – 4:20
2. "Till Death Do Us Part" (LP version) – 5:09
3. "Holiday" (12-inch version) – 6:20

== Credits and personnel ==
- Madonna – lead vocals, songwriter, producer
- Patrick Leonard – songwriter, producer, arranger, mixing
- Bill Meyers – arranger, mixing
- Chuck Findley – arranger, trumpet
- Nadirah Ali – background vocals
- Rose Banks – background vocals
- Guy Pratt – drum programming, synthesizer
- Camille – strings, background vocals
- Paulinho da Costa – percussion
- Herb Ritts – cover art photographer

Credits and personnel adapted from Like a Prayer album liner notes.

== Charts ==
=== Weekly charts ===
Weekly chart performance for "Dear Jessie"
Chart (1989–1990)	Peak position
Australia (ARIA)	51
Austria (Ö3 Austria Top 40)	21
Europe (European Hot 100 Singles)	9
Finland (Suomen virallinen lista)	8
Ireland (IRMA)	3
Netherlands (Dutch Top 40)	25
Netherlands (Single Top 100)	17
Spain (AFYVE)	17
Switzerland (Schweizer Hitparade)	16
UK Singles (Official Charts)	5
West Germany (GfK)	19

=== Year-end charts ===
Year-end chart performance for "Dear Jessie"
Chart (1989)	Position
UK Singles (OCC)	97
Chart (1990)	Position
Germany (Media Control)	94

== Certifications and sales ==
Certifications and sales for "Dear Jessie"
Region	Certification	Certified units/sales
United Kingdom (BPI)	Silver	255,000

== See also ==
- List of European number-one airplay songs of the 1990s

== Bibliography ==
- Anderson, Christopher P. (1992), Madonna: Unauthorized, Island Books, ISBN 0-440-21318-5
- Bego, Mark (2000), Madonna: Blonde Ambition, Cooper Square Press, ISBN 0-8154-1051-4
- Clerk, Carol (2002), Madonnastyle, Omnibus Press, ISBN 0-7119-8874-9
- Fouz-Hernández, Santiago; Jarman-Ivens, Freya (2004), Madonna's Drowned Worlds, Ashgate Publishing, Ltd, ISBN 0-7546-3372-1
- Metz, Allen; Benson, Carol (1999), The Madonna Companion: Two Decades of Commentary, Music Sales Group, ISBN 0-8256-7194-9
- O'Brien, Lucy (2007), Madonna: Like an Icon, Bantam Press, ISBN 978-0-593-05547-2
- Okamoto, Satoshi (2006), Oricon Single Chart Book: Complete Edition 1968–2005, Roppongi, Tokyo: Oricon Entertainment, ISBN 4-87131-076-0
- Reid, Robin Anne (2009), Women in Science Fiction and Fantasy: Overviews, American Bibliographic Company – CLIO Press, ISBN 978-0-313-33591-4
- Rooksby, Rikky (2004), The Complete Guide to the Music of Madonna, Omnibus Press, ISBN 0-7119-9883-3
- Ryan, Gavin (2011). Australia's Music Charts 1988–2010 (PDF ed.). Mt Martha, Victoria, Australia: Moonlight Publishing. p. 174.
- Salaverri, Fernando (2005), Sólo éxitos: año a año, 1959–2002, Fundación Autor-SGAE, ISBN 84-8048-639-2
- Taraborrelli, Randy J. (2002), Madonna: An Intimate Biography, Simon & Schuster, ISBN 978-1-4165-8346-2
