= Paul Zollo =

American writer and singer

- Born: Paul Steven Zollo; Chicago, Illinois, U.S.
- Occupations: Author; journalist; musician; photographer

Paul Steven Zollo (born August 9, 1958) is a songwriter, singer and recording artist for Trough Records. He has also authored many books, is a photographer and music journalist. He was the senior editor of American Songwriter magazine for 24 years.

He wrote "Songwriters On Songwriting," "More Songwriters On Songwriting," "Conversations with Tom Petty, Expanded Edition," "Hollywood Remembered," "Schirmer's Complete Rhyming Dictionary" and "The Beginning Songwriter's Answer Book."

He is the leader of the L.A. band the Ghosters, with whom he made one self-titled album of his original songs in 1984. He also made two solo albums, Orange Avenue (which features a duet with Art Garfunkel on the song "Being in this World") and Universal Cure.

He has written songs with many songwriters and artists, including Darryl Purpose, Steve Allen, Dan Bern, Bob Malone, Stephen Kalinich, and Severin Browne.

== Journalist ==
Zollo was the editor of SongTalk magazine for many years, and went on to become Senior Editor of American Songwriter magazine and Managing Editor of Performing Songwriter magazine. He has also contributed articles to many magazines including Variety, Billboard, Rolling Stone, Musician, Oxford Press, Playback, Gorgeous, Boulevard, Music Connection, and Campus Circle.

== Father ==
His father, Burt Zollo, was also a writer, the author of three books (The Dollars & Sense of Public Relations [McGraw Hill], Prisoners, A Novel [Chicago Academy Press], and State & Wacker, A Novel [iUniverse]) and many magazine essays and articles. A former colleague of Hugh Hefner at Esquire magazine, he contributed to the first issues of Playboy magazine, including the inaugural Marilyn Monroe issue, under the pseudonym "Bob Norman".

== Bibliography ==
- The Beginning Songwriter's Answer Book (1990)
- Songwriters on Songwriting
- Songwriters on Songwriting (Expanded Edition) (2003)
- Hollywood Remembered (An Oral History of Its Golden Age) (2002)
- Conversations with Tom Petty (2005)
- Sunset & Cahuenga (A Novel)
- The Schirmer's Complete Rhyming Dictionary. (2007)
- More Songwriters on Songwriting (2016)
- Conversations with Tom Petty, Expanded Edition' (2020)
