= List of Madonna records and achievements =

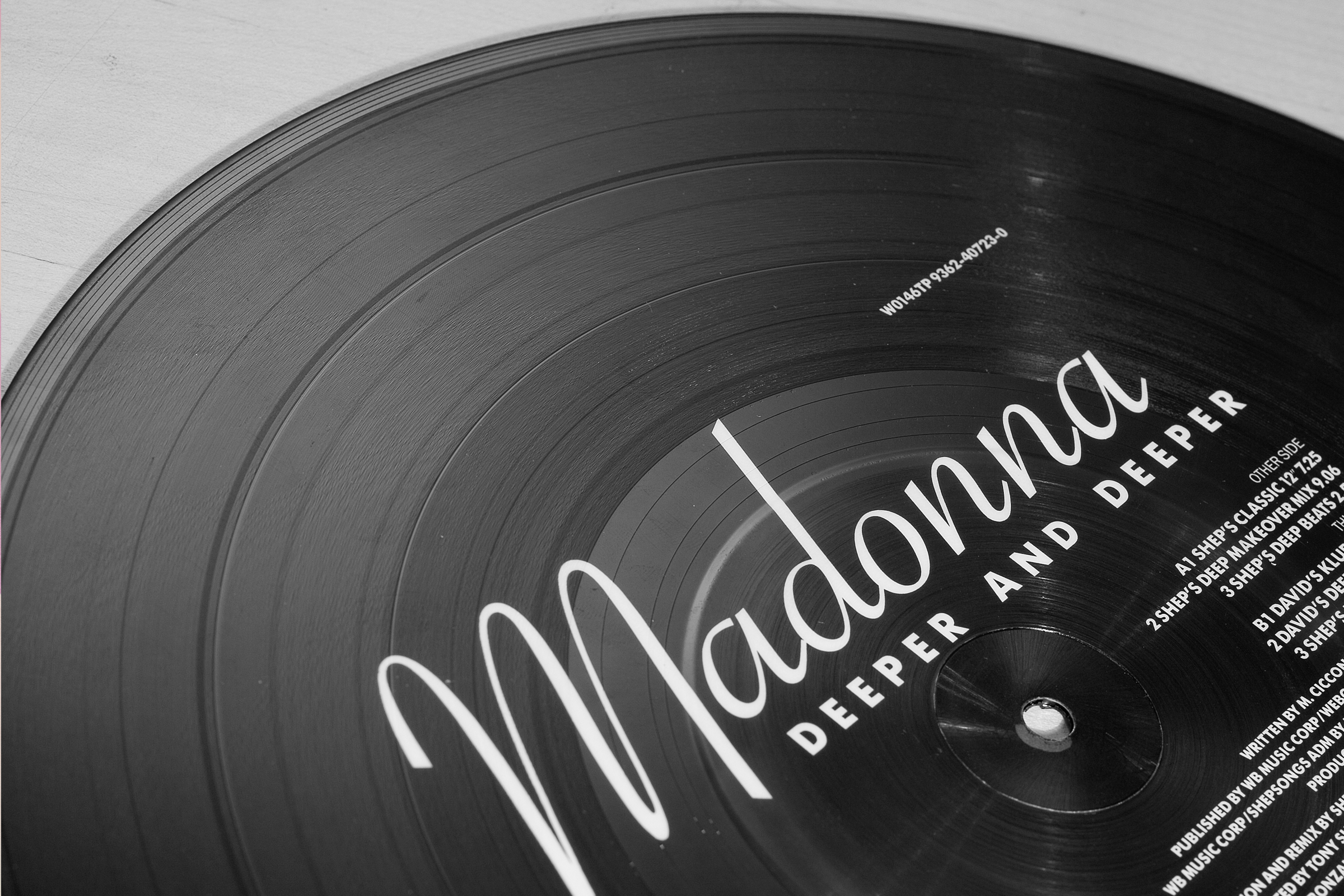
Madonna remains as the world's best-selling woman in music.

Throughout her career spanning five decades, American singer-songwriter Madonna has obtained a series of statistical achievements during the album era, setting and breaking several world records with her participation in entrepreneurial activities, of acting and her performance in the musical scene for her videos, singles, albums, and tours.

Her first appearance in the Guinness Book of World Records was in 1986 with her third studio album, True Blue. Thereafter she has earned multiple appearances, including her title as the world's best-selling female recording artist, recognized since the 20th century. As of February 2012, she retained 20 entries at the same time in the Guinness World Records, a very similar figure obtained by Paul McCartney in 2003; the highest number of record holding at same time by a musician with 26.

In a multiple-decades long period, her statistics and numbers achieved scrutiny beyond music industry, including business and marketing communities. In 1992, Bob Tannenbaum from The New York Times called to her as "the most statistically significant artist of the 80s". Madonna was also nicknamed variously for her success in different formats and charts, including from Billboard staffers. However, she also scored some less favorable records, such as the most Golden Raspberry won by a woman or then the largest drop by a number-one album in the Nielsen SoundScan period during its second week.

Madonna made appearance at various anniversaries of record charts, including some of major music markets, where attained notable high positions. In Germany, she was named "the most successful singles artist" by GfK Entertainment charts and in the United States, she was called "the most successful solo artist of the Billboard Hot 100", as well "the most successful act of the Dance Club Songs" and fifth "Greatest Chart All-Stars" (all charts combined). The Guinness also recognized her as the most successful US DVD chart artist. Madonna was named by Official Charts Company (OCC) as "the most successful female artist in UK charts history". She was named the most successful female artist in the history of RPM charts, in Canada, and by Music & Media in continental Europe.

== Critical commentaries ==
In a multiple decades-long period, her records, achievements and statistics were relatively often commented by press, and other observers, including business community. Roger Blackwell is an example. In 1992, Bob Tannenbaum from The New York Times called her "the most statistically significant artist of the 80s", while in 2019, Vanessa Grigoriadis from the same publication called her the "world's highest-charting female musician". In 2008, Damian Corless from Irish Independent referred to her "stunning vital statistics", while rock music journalist John Tobler, complimented her records compared to other male artists in 1991. Nina Simosko from American business magazine Fast Company made a similar comparative in 2008, and in 2013, The Cut editor Rebecca Harrington paraphrasing said, "Madonna's actual accomplishments are too much for the modern human to even contemplate". Greg Seigworth, complimented her numbers overseas, and both Ray B. Browne and William Labov referred to her "unprecedented regularity" to reach the top of the pop charts for decades.

Music writer Dave McAleer, made the question in Chart Beats (1991): "Does Madonna cherish all the records she has broken?". Madonna herself has responded to various journalists including Simon Garfield and Howard Stern, when they asked about her numbers, sales, awards and records. She often expressed that awards "are overrated" and admits she pays no heed to her accolades, accomplishments or chart positions, claiming "I'd rather be distantly aware of it than putting too much importance to it" and "I don't focus on my accomplishments, I focus on things I haven't done yet". Carrie Havranek, wrote in Women Icons of Popular Music (2009), that she "is not necessarily interested when her manager tells her how quickly a concert has sold out; she is more interested in whether she is satisfied with it as an artistic achievement". Some media outlets have reported in various opportunities how she was "nonchalant" for receiving some honors, including United Press International in 1987, and also for declining her Hollywood Walk of Fame in 1990.

== Definitions ==
Key
×	Denotes record broken by another individual
+	Denotes record broken by another individual, while she holds a next category
±	Denotes record tied by another individual
◆	Included or mentioned by Guinness

== Selected global and regional records and achievements ==
Record title/Achievements	Notes
Best-selling female artist ◆	Madonna is the record-holder in the Guinness World Records since the 20th century. Listed also in the past as "most successful female artist", the 1999 edition says: "No female artist has sold more records around the world than Madonna". At some point of her career, the Guinness have mentioned that Madonna was only beaten by Elvis Presley, the Beatles and Michael Jackson in terms of record sales, but recognized that record sales are hard to known.
Most Successful Female Solo Artist ◆	A title given by the Guinness at least since 1989. Updated in the following years from 1990 to 2002. With the 2002 edition saying: "Her total sales are more than any other female music star".
Most successful artist of 1986 ◆	A title given by the Guinness.
Best-selling album by a woman × ◆	According to the 1992 edition of Guinness Book of World Records, True Blue was the best-selling album of all time by a woman, with sales of more than 17 million until October 1990.
Best-selling compilation (or greatest-hits) album by a solo artist	According to some sources, The Immaculate Collection has sold over 30 million copies worldwide, the most by other compilations by female or male performers.
Best-selling remix album by a female artist	With You Can Dance and is reportedly to be the second best-selling overall, with 5 million copies globally. She originally held the title of best-selling remix album of all time, until being surpassed by Michael Jackson with Blood on the Dancefloor.
Most tickets sold by a female artist	According to a 2022 report from Pollstar, Madonna sold 11,672,443 tickets worldwide; the highest amount recorded for any female music in their list.
First pop female artist to gross USD one million from a concert	According to Billboard, Madonna became the first female pop artist ever to gross more than $1 million from a single performance. She achieved that feat with her gig at Miami Orange Bowl during the Who's That Girl World Tour.
First female artist to gross USD one billion from tours	Depending on the measure, diverse outlets have reported Madonna to be the first female to cross the billion-mark from her concert tours. As it was reported, she was among the first sixth acts that scored the mark since 1990.
Highest-grossing solo touring artist +	In 2006, Madonna became the first woman in history to surpass $500 million in concert revenue. In 2012, she became the first woman with touring gross of $1 billion. In 2016, Madonna generated $1.31 billion tickets sales to become the highest-grossing solo touring artist, overtaking Bruce Springsteen's $1.25 billion. Springsteen previously overtook Madonna's record in 2012. As of February 2022, Madonna remains with the title with over $1.5 billion tickets sales. She also remains the highest-female touring artist, a feat including in the Billboard Boxscore database, as well for Pollstar as of 2022.
Highest-grossing female touring artist
Highest-grossing tour by a solo artist +	Madonna set the record in solo general category with Sticky & Sweet Tour, which was, shortly after its culmination, the second highest-grossing tour of all time, just behind A Bigger Bang Tour. In 2006, she set the record for females with Confessions Tour, which was surpassed soon after by Madonna's own Sticky & Sweet Tour,. It remains the all-time highest-grossing tour by a female artist.
Highest-grossing tour by a female artist ◆	Madonna set the record in solo general category with Sticky & Sweet Tour, which was, shortly after its culmination, the second highest-grossing tour of all time, just behind A Bigger Bang Tour. In 2006, she set the record for females with Confessions Tour, which was surpassed soon after by Madonna's own Sticky & Sweet Tour,. It remains the all-time highest-grossing tour by a female artist.
Highest-grossing music tour per concert by a female artist ◆	Confessions Tour is recognized as the highest-grossing music tour per concert with $3.2 million grossed per concert.
Highest-grossing documentary of all time ×	Madonna: Truth or Dare held the title during 11 years.
Largest simultaneous publication in multiple languages for a book	The English Roses was released in 100 countries and translated into 30 languages at the first day of publication.
Largest first-edition published for a book	Sex set the record for the largest first printing of an illustrated book in publishing history.
Best-selling coffee-table book	Sex is the best-selling as well the fastest-selling coffee-table book in publishing history.
Most costume changes in a film for a character ◆	In Evita Madonna changed costume 85 times.
Most expensive music video ×	Madonna held the record for a while with "Express Yourself".
Most remixed act ◆	Madonna's music has been remixed and sampled more than any other performer in history.
Song topping charts in the most countries ◆	"Hung Up" topped the charts of 41 countries.
Album topping charts in the most countries ◆	Madonna set this record with True Blue when topped the lists of 28 countries. She broke again the record with Confessions on a Dance Floor, a project that topped the album charts of 40 countries.
Biggest Pajama Party ×	In 1995, Madonna launched the "Madonna's Pajama Party" to promote the video "Bedtime Story" at the Webster Hall in front of 2,000 people. However, in 2014 the Guinness listed a British held in Girlguiding North West England that was attended by 2,004 participants as the largest sleepover/pyjama party.
Biggest live webcast ◆	Her performance in London's Brixton Academy in 2000 attracted more than 11 million users, smashing the previous record of 3 million held by Paul McCartney. It was featured in the Guinness as the "Largest internet pop concert".
Largest day of pre-orders in iTunes history	The MDNA was pre-ordered on iTunes in 50 countries across the world, the largest ever for the platform.
Largest audience ever for a stand-alone concert ×	The final show of the Celebration Tour, held on May 4, 2024 on Copacabana Beach in Rio de Janeiro, organized as the inaugurational edition of Todo Mundo no Rio, attracted 1.6 million viewers. A year later the record was surprassed by Lady Gaga, whose show on Todo Mundo no Rio drew 2.1 million viewers.
Best debut day on Spotify for an album by a solo female artist who debuted in the 1980s at the latest	On its first day of release, Confessions II (2026) received 13,068,922 streams on Spotify. Moreover, it was the second-best album debut for any solo artist who debuted before 2000.
Largest audience on a standalone TikTok live stream	Madonna' live stream event for Confessions II release on July 2, 2026 drew over 2.1 million viewers worldwide.

=== Europe ===
Record title/Achievements	Notes
Highest-grossing concert in Scandinavia	After selling 85,000 tickets from her Sticky & Sweet Tour in Helsinki, Finland, it became the biggest single show by an artist in history for all of Scandinavia.
Largest paid ever for an event in Nordic countries	According to Yle, her concert at Finland as part of her Sticky & Sweet Tour, was the largest concert ever in Nordic countries, as well the largest paid event ever seen with 85,000 tickets sold. Although, actual crowd that converged on the concert area were close to 100,000.
Largest music concert at Iberian Peninsula	75,000 people in Lisbon, Portugal attended her gig of the Sticky & Sweet Tour in 2008, the largest crowd recorded in the area.
Longest stay at number one on the European Top 100 Albums	Her album True Blue spent 34 consecutive weeks at the top of the European album charts, more than any other album.
Longest stay at number-one on the European Hot 100 (female) ×	"Like a Prayer" spent 12 consecutive weeks, only equaled at that time by "I Just Called" of Stevie Wonder. Whitney Houston and Celine Dion spent more weeks.
Most number-one singles on the European Hot 100	In 1994, Madonna scored 10 number-one singles.
Most charted singles in Europe during one year	In 1985, Madonna entered five songs from the album Like a Virgin and another two singles from soundtracks in the Music & Media charts.
Most charted singles on the European Hot 100	In 1989, Madonna had 18 entries, a record for the chart. In the following years, she extended that feat; as of 1994, she entered 33 songs in the European Hot 100 Singles.
Highest entry ever in the European Airplay Top 50	Her single "Who's that Girl" debuted to the number-three in the European Airplay Top 50, the largest entry recorded at that time. She later surpassed this record, with "Like a Prayer" which debuted atop of the chart, and marked the first time a song reached the top in its debut.
Highest entry ever in the European Radio Top 50	"Frozen" scored the highest entry (at number 9) for the European Radio Top 50 chart created in 1997.
Highest entry ever in the European Top 100 Albums (soloist or female)	With True Blue entering at number 8, scored the then second overall debut (behind bands Queen and Genesis) and first for a solo artist. Madonna later scored better debuts in many of her next releases, with American Life being her first to go straight in at number one.
Largest additions to the European radio	"Secret" scored the highest amount of adds ever recorded (48), and the highest new additions to radio as well (31).

Ending the 1980s, Madonna topped the three Music & Media charts of that time during two different years, a feat achieved only before by Michael Jackson (1987 and 1988), thus make the first female singer to reach that feat in Europe. In 1986, Madonna became the first and only female artist to have her entire album catalog charted in the year-end European charts. Madonna is the first artist to dominate the Music & Media Year-End awards in three different years (1985, 1986 and 1987).

== Australia ==
Record title/Achievements	Notes
Best-selling greatest-hits album by a female artist	The Immaculate Collection is the best-selling ever greatest-hits album by a woman in Australia. It is also one of the best-selling albums in the country.
Most number-one albums on the ARIA albums chart +	Madonna has 12 number one albums on ARIA albums charts. However, in the combined two official album charts of Australia (Kent Music Report and ARIA), The Beatles scored a total of 14 number-one albums. Madonna still having the most number-one albums among female artists in Australian albums chart history (all-lists combined).
Most number-one albums by a female artist on the ARIA albums chart	Madonna has 12 number one albums on ARIA albums charts. However, in the combined two official album charts of Australia (Kent Music Report and ARIA), The Beatles scored a total of 14 number-one albums. Madonna still having the most number-one albums among female artists in Australian albums chart history (all-lists combined).
Most number-one singles by a female artist on the ARIA singles chart	Madonna is the female artist with the most number-one songs in Australia, with 11; but 10 of them are from ARIA singles chart period, which is equaled by Kylie Minogue as of 2019, and Taylor Swift as of 2020.
Artists with the most cumulative weeks at number-one (singles chart)	Madonna is the artist with the most weeks spent in the ARIA singles charts, with 38 weeks as of 2013.
First soloist with self-replacement at number one on the ARIA singles chart	In 1985, Madonna's "Crazy for You" replaced her another release "Angel"/"Into the Groove". At least in 1993, was reported that she remained as the only female act to do this feat.
First female act with chart-topper albums in five different decades (ARIA era)	As of 2022, Madonna became the first international act and first female artist to score number-one albums in five different decades: 1980s (one), 1990s (six), 2000s (two), 2010s (two) and 2020s (one), equaling Australians musicians Jimmy Barnes and AC/DC as the only acts to do the feat, since ARIA Charts began in 1988.
Biggest concert ticket sales in Australia +	Madonna set the record for the biggest ticket sales in Australia with over 360,000 tickets sold of her Girlie Show. This feat was later broken by the Rolling Stone's Voodoo Lounge Tour in 1995. Subsequently, record belongs to Madonna in solo and female category.
Biggest concert ticket sales in Australia (solo or female act)	Madonna set the record for the biggest ticket sales in Australia with over 360,000 tickets sold of her Girlie Show. This feat was later broken by the Rolling Stone's Voodoo Lounge Tour in 1995. Subsequently, record belongs to Madonna in solo and female category.
Most tickets sold at Melbourne Cricket Ground	With the Girlie Show sold over 96,663 tickets from two nights, the most by any other tour.
Fastest-selling rock show in Australia	Her opening show of her 1993 tour at Melbourne Cricket Ground, sold 52,000 tickets in 80 minutes, making the fastest-ever selling rock concert in the country.
Highest-attended concert at Melbourne Cricket Ground (female)	In a list published in 2019 by music-related website Noise11.com, Madonna has the largest (and the most entries) attendance ever by a female act in the sport stadium. The only female after her, was Linda Ronstadt.
Highest-attended concert at the Adelaide Oval stadium ×	Madonna's 1993 show at the Adelaide Oval stadium attracted 40,000 people, which remained the biggest crowd on the venue for 17 years until AC/DC's concert in 2010. While she remained as the record-holder female figure, Adele's 2017 concert attracted 60,000 people, the most by any other act.

Her number-one albums (female record) span five decades in Australia (female record): 1980s, 1990s, 2000s, 2010s and 2020s. According to Australian magazine The Music Network, "all her albums have been hits" in the country, "one of the first markets to break her". Based in a Noise11.com article in 2019, until the release of Madame X, all her 14 studios albums entered at the Top-ten in the country, and a total of 20 of her releases (including compilations and soundtracks). In 2022, she attained another top-ten album with Finally Enough Love debuting at number-one position.

Her number-one singles (female record), span three different decades: 1980s, 1990s and 2000s.

== Brazil ==
Record title/Achievements	Notes
Best-selling international album by a female artist	With True Blue having sold more than one million.
Best-selling international female artist	With 3.6 million certified units by Pro-Música Brasil (as of 2021).

== Canada ==
Record title/Achievements	Notes
Most number-one singles at RPM by a woman	In 1991, Madonna had 12 number-one singles (the first female artist to achieve ten number ones), the most by any female artist, then tied with Bee Gees, Elton John and only surpassed by the Beatles (18). In 1994, she surpassed any other act with 13 number-one singles and placed second behind the Beatles, until equalled them before magazine's final issue in 2000. Her single "Music" is also the latest number-one single in the history of RPM singles chart, issued on November 6, 2000.
Most number-one singles at RPM by a solo performer	In 1991, Madonna had 12 number-one singles (the first female artist to achieve ten number ones), the most by any female artist, then tied with Bee Gees, Elton John and only surpassed by the Beatles (18). In 1994, she surpassed any other act with 13 number-one singles and placed second behind the Beatles, until equalled them before magazine's final issue in 2000. Her single "Music" is also the latest number-one single in the history of RPM singles chart, issued on November 6, 2000.
Most number-one singles in Canadian history	With 18 RPM's singles, 4 in Nielsen SoundScan's Canadian Singles Chart between 200 and 2007, and two number ones on Billboard's Canadian Hot 100 since 2007, Madonna has scored the largest amount of number-one singles in Canada.
Most consecutive top-ten singles (general)	Madonna scored the longest string of Top 10 songs, with 16. Starting with "Lucky Star" in 1994, and continuing through to "Cherish" in 1989. The streak was broken when "Oh Father" only reached the number 14.
Fastest-rising single in radio format at BDS history	Achieved with "Hung Up" according to Nielsen when reached the top position in the Canada's Contemporary Hit Radio Chart in two weeks. She later broke her own record with "4 Minutes", which debuted atop of the chart, the first time any song entered at the top in the BDS history that began in 1992.
Fastest-selling concert in Ottawa	In 2012, Madonna sold 15,000 tickets in 21 minutes for the gig of her the MDNA Tour.
Highest opening digital sales of a song ×	"4 Minutes" scored the then largest opening week sales of a digital song, until the release of Lady Gaga's "Just Dance" according to Nielsen Holdings.
First to debut atop of RPM video charts (any release)	With the video compilation The Immaculate Collection, and was also the first longform record to do so.
First video single to debut atop of RPM video charts	"Justify My Love" is the first video single to debut atop of the chart.

Both Madonna number ones albums and singles in Canada (the most by any other act) span four consecutive decades: 1980s, 1990s, 2000s and 2010s. She achieved two diamond albums in the country.

== Chile ==
Record title/Achievements	Notes
Most expensive concert tickets +	Madonna set this record with her Sticky & Sweet Tour, but was later surpassed by Luis Miguel in 2010, and by Paul McCartney in 2011. She holds the title among female artists.
Most expensive concert show	Her gigs of the MDNA Tour are the most expensive show in Chile, with a total cost of $7.5 million, of which $4.5 million was a payment, surprassing previous record-holders U2 ($3 million) and Paul McCartney ($3.7 million).
Highest attendance in Estadio Nacional de Chile for a tour	In 2012, Madonna congregated 140,000 fans with two gigs. More than any other tour.

== France ==
Record title/Achievements	Notes
Best-selling non-Francophone international female artist	She has sold over 18 million records in France as of 2022, only behind the Beatles and Michael Jackson among the international non-Francophone artists.
Largest crowd of any concert in French history	She set this record in the Sceaux, Hauts-de-Seine with her Who's That Girl World Tour, in front of over 130,000 people. It is also the largest Madonna's European crowd.
Highest first-month sales for a book ×	Madonna held the record with Sex for ten years, before being surpassed by Thierry Meyssan with L'Effroyable Imposture in 2002.
First female artist to have occupied first and second place simultaneously	Together with Johnny Clegg, Madonna was the only singer to have occupied first and second place simultaneously in the French LP charts.

All her major album catalog, including compilations and soundtracks, and with the exception of Celebration and Rebel Heart Tour have reached the Top-10 in France, including 7 number-one, 10 number-two and 3 number-three. She also has three albums with a Diamond status in the country.

== Germany ==
Record title/Achievements	Notes
Best-selling international female artist	As of 2017, Madonna was at first place among all-females (and sixth overall) in the best-selling artists in Germany, with over 12.5 million record sold. The next female singer to her, was German artist Helene Fischer with 10.2 million.
Act with the most charts entries (singles)	According to Offizielle Charts from GfK, Madonna has 68 singles entries as of 2018, more than any other act in German charts.
Most number-one albums by a foreign act +	With Rebel Heart topping the album German charts in 2015, Madonna became the foreign act with most number-one albums (12), and only behind at that time of German artists James Last (13) and Peter Maffay (16). In 2019, Robbie Williams tied Madonna after the release of The Christmas Present. However, she remains the female artist with most number-one albums in German charts history.
Most number-one albums by a foreign female artist	With Rebel Heart topping the album German charts in 2015, Madonna became the foreign act with most number-one albums (12), and only behind at that time of German artists James Last (13) and Peter Maffay (16). In 2019, Robbie Williams tied Madonna after the release of The Christmas Present. However, she remains the female artist with most number-one albums in German charts history.

As of 2018, Madonna spent a combinative 1,632 weeks (31 years) at the German charts, divided in 884 weeks for singles and 748 weeks in albums. With her charted songs from 1983 to 2018, she was always a Top 100 singles charter artist. Ray of Light is also one of the best-selling albums in Germany. Her number-one albums (female record) span four decades in Germany: 1980s, 1990s, 2000s and 2010s.

== Italy ==
Record title/Achievements	Notes
Best-selling album by a foreign artist	True Blue is the best-selling album in Italy by an international artist, with over 1.5 million copies sold.
Most number-one singles on the FIMI Italian Singles Chart (female or foreign artist)	Since 1997, Madonna scored a total of 12 number-one singles, the most by any other female or foreign artist.
Most weeks at number-one by a song in the FIMI charts ×	"Hung Up" spent 14 weeks at the top of the charts, the most ever recorded until "Waka Waka" (18 weeks).
Highest attendance at a concert in Turin	Her gig of the Who's That Girl Tour attracted 65,000 people according to Andrew Morton.

== Japan ==
Record title/Achievements	Notes
Most Artist of the Year wins from the Recording Industry Association of Japan (RIAJ) +	Madonna won five times the award, the most by any Japanese or Western act until 2009. In the next decade, she remained for a while in the international category, before being surpassed by the Beatles. She remains the female artist with most awards win and is the first international recipient ever.
Most Artist of the Year wins from the RIAJ (solo or female)	Madonna won five times the award, the most by any Japanese or Western act until 2009. In the next decade, she remained for a while in the international category, before being surpassed by the Beatles. She remains the female artist with most awards win and is the first international recipient ever.
Most top-ten albums by an international artist on the Oricon Albums Chart	She set this record with The Complete Studio Albums (1983–2008), her release number 22 that reached the top-ten. She scored another top-ten album with Rebel Heart.
First foreign female artist with two albums in the top-ten of the Oricon Albums Chart simultaneously	When she released The Complete Studio Albums (1983–2008) and MDNA, she became the first international female artist in Japanese chart history to have two albums in the top ten simultaneously and the first international artist in 20 years to achieve such feat, after Bruce Springsteen.
Oldest woman to reach the top-ten on the Oricon Albums Chart	With Sticky & Sweet Tour (2010), Madonna became the oldest woman to have a top-ten album in Japan at the age of 51. Her latest top-ten album was Rebel Heart (2015) at the age of 56. She is also the first-time ever a foreign act in her fifties entered in the Top-3 in Japan, with Celebration in 2009.

She became the first and only international artist with number-one albums in three consecutive decades: 1980s (Like a Prayer), 1990s (I'm Breathless) and 2000s (Hard Candy). In the 1980s, she scored two of the best-selling albums of that decade, the most by any other foreign act. As of 2019, she is tied with Mariah Carey, and both are behind South Korean female artists Twice and BoA, as the international female artist with most number-one albums on the Oricon Weekly Charts.

== Netherlands ==
Record title/Achievements	Notes
Female artist with most number-ones at Dutch Top 40	Madonna has five number-one singles in the Dutch Top 40 chart, as of 2012.
Act with most entries at Dutch Top 40 ±	Madonna scored 55 entries in the chart, most by any other soloist, female artist or foreign act. And equalled only by local group BZN.
Act with most weeks at Dutch Top 40 ×	Madonna held the record until being surpassed by Rihanna. As of 2012, Madonna had 540 weeks, while the latter singer scored 590 weeks.

== United Kingdom ==
Albums
Record title/Achievements	Notes
Most times for a female artist to simultaneously top the UK singles and albums charts ◆	Three times, the most by any other female artist.
Best-selling album by a female artist × ◆	The Immaculate Collection was listed in both Guinness World Books of Records and the Official Charts Company (OCC) as the UK's biggest-selling album by a woman. As of 2021, its sales have been surprassed by Amy Winehouse's Back to Black and Adele's 21.
Fastest-selling album by a female artist ×	The Immaculate Collection debuted with 330,000 copies in its first-week, the highest ever figure recorded by a female artist and behind only Michael Jackson's Bad at that time.
First woman to score five singles in the Top 5 off one album	According to the book 1,000 UK Number One Hits (2010).
Most UK number-one albums by a solo artist +	With her twelfth number-one album, MDNA (2012), Madonna surpassed Elvis Presley as the solo artist with the most number-one albums ever. Presley reclaimed that record with his posthumous compilation album, The Wonder of You (2016). In 2025, Taylor Swift surprassed Madonna as a female artist with most number-one albums, when Lover (Live from Paris) became her thirteenth chart-topper.
Most UK number-one albums by a female artist +	With her twelfth number-one album, MDNA (2012), Madonna surpassed Elvis Presley as the solo artist with the most number-one albums ever. Presley reclaimed that record with his posthumous compilation album, The Wonder of You (2016). In 2025, Taylor Swift surprassed Madonna as a female artist with most number-one albums, when Lover (Live from Paris) became her thirteenth chart-topper.
Most consecutive number-one albums in the shortest span (female) ×	Madonna had six consecutive number-one albums and took eleven years (between 1997 and 2008) to score that amount. With Evermore, Taylor Swift accumulated her six number-one album as well, achieved in a span of eight years.
First female artist with more than 10 number ones album ◆	Madonna is the first female to collect more than 10 number ones album in the UK.
First female artist to dominate year-end singles and albums charts ◆	In 1986, according to the Guinness, she became the first woman ever to top the annual sales tabulations for both singles and albums, massively outselling all other recording artists.
Most weeks at UK number one by a female × ◆	Madonna scored 30 weeks at the top of UK albums chart as of 2020 with all her chart-toppers. Adele broke that record in 2016.
Album with most consecutive weeks at number-one by a female × ◆	She established the record with The Immaculate Collection (9 weeks) until being broken by Adele's 21.
Oldest artist to simultaneously top the UK singles and album charts ◆	At the age of 47, with "Hung Up" and Confessions on a Dance Floor earning this record on November 26, 2005.
Album with most shipments before release	GHV2 had 750,000 copies shipped, overtaking the previous pre-release high of 650,000 copies achieved by Simply Red's Greatest Hits (1996).
Best-selling compilation album (solo and female artist)	The Immaculate Collection is the biggest-selling compilation album both by a solo or female artist according to OCC.
Female artist with most albums simultaneous topping the Top 40 albums ×	She had three albums in the Top 40 in 1987, but was surprassed in 2014 by English singer Kate Bush, having eight albums in count at the same time. This makes Madonna the first and only foreign female artist with most albums simultaneous in the Top 40.
Female artist with the most consecutive number one albums ×	In 2012, Rihanna equalled Madonna's chart record with Unapologetic, having both 3 number-one albums. Taylor Swift accumulated more consecutive chart-topper albums.
First American female artist to have a number-one album across five decades	With Confessions II reaching number one in 2026, 2020s became the fifth consecutive decade, in with she topped the chart.

She is also the first female singer to have had two albums that both contained five different UK Top 40 singles. In addition, she is the first female to have a studio album that feature the most UK number-one singles, with True Blue (3), a feat later surpassed by Jess Glynne (5) and Spice Girls and Lady Gaga, with four each.

Madonna has scored number-one albums (female record) across four consecutive decades: 1980s, 1990s, 2000s and 2010s. Madonna has never missed the top-ten with a studio album, and only one didn't make the top-five: her self-titled debud which peaked at 6. All of them have been number-one or number-two until the release of Madame X.

Singles
Record title/Achievements	Notes
Most successful songwriters in the UK charts ◆	Included in the Guinness Book of World Records in 1988 and 1989 with 4 singles, and 7 singles in the 1992 edition.
U.K.'s biggest selling female singles artist	In 2012, Official Charts Company revealed the best-selling artists in singles format, with Madonna being the first among females with 17.8 million copies sold and behind of the Beatles, Elvis Presley and Cliff Richard.
Most UK number-one singles by a female artist ◆	She earned this record with "La Isla Bonita" in 1987, her UK fourth number-one single. She remains the female artist with the most number-one singles ever, with 13.
Most UK number-two singles (general)	She's got more number two peaks on the UK chart singles than any other artist, with 12.
Most consecutive top-ten singles (general) ◆	From 1984 to 1994, Madonna amassed a record of 36 consecutive top-ten entries (32 recorded in the Guinness) in the UK. She had another 17 run of top-ten entries from "You Must Love Me" in 1996 until "Me Against the Music" in 2003.
Most top-ten singles by a female ◆	Included in the Guinness World Books of Records at least since 1989 with 15 top five singles at that time. As of 2020, she scored 63 Top 10s, and placed third overall behind Elvis Presley (76) and Cliff Richard (68).
Most top-ten singles in a year	According to Dave McAleer, Madonna entered 8 of her songs in the top-ten in a single year.
Longest chart run in the UK by a solo artist ◆	With a total of 64 singles according to the Guinness and ended with "Miles Away" when peaked at number 39, breaking her run of 64 UK Top 20 entries in a row (59 of which had reached the Top 10).
Most Top-5 singles by a female	She scored 46 singles top five. Only Elvis Presley has more.
Most Top 20 singles in a week ±	Madonna is tied with Elvis Presley and Ruby Murray as each of them have five songs topping the Top 20 in the same week.
Most Top-40 entries by a female	As of 2015, Madonna scored her 71st Top 40 U.K. Single.
Most Top-50 entries by a female at the same time	In 1985, Madonna became the first female with three singles in the chart at the same time.
Highest number of radio plays for a single	Scored with "Beautiful Stranger" with 2,462 plays, beating previous Cher's record with "Believe" and its 2,457 plays in one week.
Highest debuting single for any female ×	"Into the Groove" entered at number four, the highest debuting peak ever recorded by a female artist at the time. She later broke this record with "True Blue" entering at number three. "Frozen" became her first single to debut at the top of the UK Singles Chart.
First female artist to hold the top-two positions of the UK singles chart simultaneously	In 1985, Madonna set this female record with "Into the Groove" topping number one and "Holiday" the second place. A feat that only three British acts had before her: the Beatles, John Lennon and Frankie Goes To Hollywood. A feat that remained unmatched until 2019 with Ariana Grande; while Madonna couldn't replace herself in the top position, Grande did.
First female artist to top year-end singles report	In 1985, Madonna became the first female artist ever to top the yearly end report for singles.
First female artist who have peaked at every position in the Top 10	Madonna has popped up at every Top 10 position, managing it in 11 years, six months and eight days; the first female to do so.
Most number-one singles during the 1980s (general)	She had six number ones, more than any other act during the decade.

During the 2000s, she scored more number-one singles by a female artist, with five. Her UK number-one singles (female record) span three decades: 1980s, 1990s and 2000s.

2007 was the first year since Madonna's career began that she didn't have a single appear on the chart at all. She'd previously had years without any new entries −1988 and 2004– but there had been a couple of songs lingering in the Top 40 from the previous year. Her singles have spent 516 weeks as of 2022, in the Top 40 since her first hit in 1984, nearly 10 years.

Others
Record title/Achievements	Notes
Biggest-selling female album act of the 21st century × ◆	During the period of 2000 to 2009, Madonna sold 6,680,000 units in the UK, the most by any other female artist. However, in 2021, Madonna was placed third by OCC behind Adele and Pink.
Most certified artist in the United Kingdom	With 45 awards from the British Phonographic Industry (BPI) as of April 2013.
Most played artist of the decade (2000–2009)	Figure compiled by Phonographic Performance Limited (PPL) for BBC Radio 2. She received most airplay and public performances of her recordings from 2000 to 2009.
Most searched artist of the decade (2000–2009)	Study was elaborated by Liverpool Lime Street railway station and Madonna has accrued 45,633 mentions over the decade 2000–2009.
Fastest-selling concert at Earls Court Exhibition Centre	She set this record in 2001 with her Drowned World Tour, sold-out her dates at Earls Court Exhibition Centre in a record time – six shows in six hours; a total of 97,000 tickets sold.
Highest-grossing concert in Wembley Stadium +	With her Sticky & Sweet Tour Madonna performed to a sell-out crowd of over 74,000 fans and grossed over US$12 million, surpassing all previous grosses at both the old and the new Wembley Stadiums. Since that date U2 and their 360° Tour has broken the attendance record at Wembley Stadium with a crowd of 88,000 spectators.
Most appearances at Wembley Stadium by a female artist	As of 2009, Madonna offered nine concert at the stadium, the most by any other female and behind Michael Jackson, The Rolling Stones or U2.
First person to be inducted in the Wembley Arena Square of Fame	Madonna is both the first person and female artist to be inducted in the Wembley Arena Square of Fame.
Fastest-selling children picture book	With The English Roses, selling about 10,000 copies in its first-week.

== United States ==
Billboard records
Record title/Achievements	Notes
Most number-ones on all Billboard charts combined	In 2012, Billboard presented Madonna as the individual with most number ones in all charts combined, a record of 156 number-one winning support at pop, dance and adult formats.
Most number-ones on singular Billboard chart	With a total of 50 Dance Club Songs chart-toppers as of 2020, is the largest amount of number-one collected on a singular Billboard chart.
Most number-one singles by a female artist on the Billboard Hot 100 × ◆	With "This Used to Be My Playground" (Madonna's tenth number one single) broke her tie with Whitney Houston as the female artist with the most number one singles on the US Billboard Hot 100. She accumulated a total of 12 number-one singles, but was later surpassed by Mariah Carey in 1997 and Rihanna in 2012.
Most number-one singles by a female songwriter on the Billboard Hot 100 ×	Madonna replaced Carole King when she released "Take a Bow" in 1994, her 11th number-one song in the chart. However, Mariah Carey broke that record.
Most top-ten singles on the Billboard Hot 100 ×	Madonna remains the artist with the most top-ten singles in pre-streaming era. Her 38 top-ten singles span from "Borderline" (1984) to "Give Me All Your Luvin'". Madonna held the record for 18 years, taking it from the Beatles in 2002 and being surpassed by Drake in 2020.
Most top-ten singles on the Billboard Hot 100 by a female ×	She established the record with "Keep It Together" becoming her 18th top-ten on the Billboard Hot 100 in 1990, and breaking her tie with Aretha Franklin. She held the record for 32 years, until being surpassed by Taylor Swift in 2022.
First recording artist that yielded a Top 10 hit with each record	As of 2008, Madonna was the only recording artist for whom every album (except those from which no single was released) has yielded a Top Ten hit according to the Rock and Roll Hall of Fame. That period covers all her catalog from 1983 to 2008.
First female artist with a top-ten album between 1980s—2020s	With Finally Enough Love: 50 Number Ones reaching the number eight in the Billboard 200, Madonna became the first female artist to score a top ten album in the 1980s, 1990s, 2000s, 2010s and 2020s. Only Barbra Streisand has more top-ten albums in six different decades: 1960s, 1970s, 1980s, 1990s, 2000s and 2010s.
Longest string of consecutive Top 5 singles by a female at Billboard Hot 100 ◆	Madonna scored 16 consecutive top-five singles, the second-longest and the most by a female artist. It started with "Lucky Star" (1983) and ended with "Cherish" (1989).
Longest string of consecutive Top 20 singles by a female at Billboard Hot 100 ◆	She scored 27 consecutive Top 20 entries between 1983 and 1992.
Most number-two peaking singles on the Billboard Hot 100 ×	She earned this record with "Frozen" in 1998, surpassing Elvis Presley. Up that point, Madonna scored six number two singles. In 2019, Taylor Swift equalled her record with "You Need to Calm Down" and by 2022, she broke the record after the release of her album Midnights.
Most number-one singles at Billboard Dance Club Songs ◆	As of 1999, she amassed 19 number-one dance singles according to the Guinness. As of 2020, she collected a total of 50 number-one singles, the most ever recorded ever.
Most entries at the Mainstream Top 40 ×	She scored 24 entries as of 2004, the highest amount recorded at that point.
Most debut at the Top-25 in the Mainstream Top 40	With "Give Me All Your Luvin'", Madonna scored her seventh top-25 debut, the most since the survey premiered the week of October 3, 1992.
Most entries on the Billboard Adult Top 40	Madonna has the most entries with 17 songs as of 2011.
First person in chart history to have the top three songs of the year on the dance sales recap	Madonna scored this record in 2005.
First song ever to chart based on Internet sales alone at Billboard	"American Life" debuted with first-week sales of 4,000 downloads, making the first time a song ever to chart based on Internet sales alone.
Fastest climb to the Top 10 in the Billboard Dance Club Songs	"Nothing Really Matters" rocketed 21–9 the week of February 20, 1999.
Most Top-40 entries at Billboard Hot 100 by a female × ◆	She established this record with "Die Another Day", her 44th Top 40 single. She extended her record with "Hung Up", her 46th entry. She accumulated a couple of more Top 40 entries in the following years, but others female singers has amassed more hits.
Most number-one singles on U.S. 12-inch dance singles chart ◆	Formerly known as Dance/Electronic Singles Sales, according to the Guinness, Madonna had 16 singles number-one in this dance format as of 1999. More than double the total of the three joint runners-up (Prince, Janet and Michael Jackson).
Shortest span with most top-ten singles by a female artist on the Billboard Hot 100 ×	In 2011, Rihanna broke her record. She's had 20 songs in the top-ten in six years and four months, beating out Madonna by five months.
First act to collect a number-one single at Billboard Dance Club Songs in five different decades	Madonna is the first act to have at least a number-one in five different decades in this chart: 1980s, 1990s, 2000s, 2010s and 2020s.
Most consecutive number-one albums at Billboard 200 ×	MDNA became her fifth straight studio album to debut at number one, the highest amount recorded at that time. She was later surpassed by Beyoncé and Taylor Swift.
Most number-one on the Billboard Top Music Videos ◆	Her MDNA World Tour DVD topped the US Billboard Top Music Videos, becoming her sixth consecutive and tenth video to top the chart —the most for any artist.
Highest debut in the Billboard Hot 100 for a female ×	"Rescue Me" debuted at 15 in its first day, the highest ever recorded by a female artist at this point, the highest since 1970 with "Let It Be".
First record to earn a "Power Pick /Sales & Airplay" on Billboard Hot 100	A measure created in 1985, "Papa Don't Preach" is the first record to score this combination of sales and airplay.
First woman to sell 3 million singles in a calendar year	Established in 1985.
First artist to rule all four dance charts	She established this record with "Sorry" in 2006. Lady Gaga is second, as she equalled this feat in 2009.
Highest debut at Hot Digital Tracks ×	"Me Against the Music" debuted at number three with 4,500 downloads, then the largest first-week download recorded at that time.

Selected Billboard records (by decade)
Record title/Achievements	Notes
Most consecutive top-ten entries on the Billboard Hot 100 (1980s) ±	Madonna tied with Michael Jackson as the acts with most consecutive top-ten entries in the 1980s.
Most number-ones singles at Billboard Hot 100 (1980s) ±	Madonna scored a total of 7 number-ones singles, tied with Whitney Houston. Only surpassed by Michael Jackson, with 9.
Most physical singles sold during the 2000s	Between 2000 and 2009, Madonna sold more singles in physical format that any other act.

RIAA, Nielsen and sales records
Record title/Achievements	Notes
Best-selling female rock artist of the 20th century	According to a 1999 report from the Recording Industry Association of America (RIAA).
Best-selling album by a female artist ×	For a while, Like a Virgin held the title of the best-selling album by a woman in the States.
Fastest succession of topping The New York Times' children's picture book list	In 2003, Madonna released The English Roses (September) and Mr. Peabody's Apples (November). Both topped the New York Times children's picture book list, and represented a first in publishing history.
Best-selling video single	"Justify My Love" is the best-selling video singles of all time. It sold between 800,000 and one million units.
Best-selling music video in LaserDisc	When Blond Ambition World Tour Live crossed 50,000 it became the best-selling music video in LaserDisc format.
Most multi-platinum album by a female artist ± ◆	Madonna shares this record with Barbra Streisand with 10 multi-platinum albums in the 1998 edition of the Guinness. Both have currently 12, as of 2017.
Most consecutive multi-platinum albums by a female artist	Achieved on or before 1991, according to a Billboard report. Overall, her first 8 studio albums (1983–2000) earned multi-platinum status. She is indeed, the first female artist to score 7 consecutive multi-platinum studio albums when Ray of Light came out. As of 2017, she is tied with Streisand with the most multi-platinum albums: 12 in total.
Biggest first-week sales by a female artist in Nielsen SoundScan era ×	When Ray of Light debuted at number two on the Billboard 200 albums chart on the issue dated March 21, 1998, with 371,000 copies sold.
Best-selling DVD single ◆	Madonna set this record when "Music" moved 4,200 sales in its first-week. She broke her own record with "What It Feels Like for a Girl"; it sold 6,200 copies in its first-week, the greatest ever registered week's sale for any single released on the DVD format according to the Guinness.
Biggest second-week percentage drop for a number-one debuting album in the Nielsen SoundScan era ×	With her 2012 studio album, MDNA. The album slid from No. 1 to No. 8 on the Billboard 200 with an 86.7% sales decline (falling from 359,000 to 48,000 according to SoundScan) Shawn Mendes surpassed the record with her 2015 album Handwritten, which dropped 89% from its number-one debut. For female terms, Celine Dion broke the record with Courage in 2019.
First single by a female artist earning a multi-platinum certification	With "Vogue" and became the third overall single to earn that level since the introduction in 1984.
First video single released in the United States	"Justify My Love" is the first video single commercially released in the U.S.
First video single earning a multi-platinum certification	"Justify My Love" is the first multi-platinum video single in the U.S. history.
First female vocalist to top the 5 million sales mark with more than one album	Madonna is the first female to score and consecutive, the 5-million mark with more than one album: Madonna, Like a Virgin and True Blue in the U.S.
Most gold-certified singles by a female artist ×	With "Don't Tell Me" going gold, Madonna surpassed the Beatles for having most gold certified singles in the United States, and becoming first among females. She had 28th gold certified titles, with "Give Me All Your Luvin'" her latest gold certified single; since then, due streaming figures and album-equivalent units, more female singers have scored higher than Madonna.
Best-selling video single of the SoundScan era	With "Ray of Light" when surpass in June 1998, 7,381 copies.

Television, concerts and awards
Record title/Achievements	Notes
Most MTV Video Music Awards wins × ◆	Included in the Guinness with 20 trophies won (until 1999). Beyoncé broke her record in 2016.
Most MTV Video Music Awards wins in a night by a female artist × ◆	According to the Guinness (2000 edition), Madonna won six MTV Video Music Awards in 1998 out of nine nominations. In 2010, Lady Gaga broke that record with eight trophies won in a single year.
Most MTV Video Music Awards nominations in a single year	Madonna received thirtheen nominations for the 2026 MTV Video Music Awards, tying Lady Gaga's 2010 record.
Highest-grossing music theater tour	With the Madame X Tour, no other artist has billed so much per night on a tour of theaters.
Most Golden Raspberry Awards wins by a female actress	As of 2003, she had 9 trophies.
Highest-grossing concert film in the U.S. ×	Madonna: Truth or Dare made $15 million at U.S. box office, but was later surpassed in 2008 by Hannah Montana & Miley Cyrus: Best of Both Worlds Concert.
Most censored episode in American network television talk-show history	Madonna on Late Show with David Letterman in 1994 when she used the word "fuck" 14 times.
Most-watched Super Bowl halftime show of all time ×	Her performance in 2012 was the most viewed Super Bowl halftime show ever, defeating Michael Jackson's previous record, with 114 million viewers. This record was later broken by Bruno Mars in 2014 and again by Katy Perry in 2015.
Highest-grossing concert in Los Angeles Memorial Sports Arena ×	She set this record with her Blond Ambition World Tour in 1990, grossing $456,720.

Others U.S. music trade magazines
Record title/Achievements	Notes
Highest debut at the American Top 40 (AT40) ±	Both 1992 songs "I'll Be There" by Mariah Carey and "Erotica" debuted at the number two.
Female with most number-one at the American Top 40 (rock era)	Madonna established this record in 1989 with 17 songs.
First charted song in Radio & Records (R&R) lists without any album available	"Into the Groove" entered at the Contemporary hit radio (CHR) of Radio & Records (R&R), and marked the first time a song entered in any R&R charts without any kind of album available.
Most number-one CHR songs during the 1980s (female)	Madonna scored a total of 9 number-one songs in the CHR charts, the most by any female and tied with Michael Jackson.
Most entries in the CHR chart during the 1980s (female or solo artist)	Madonna tied with duo Hall & Oates, with 21 entries each.
Most chart appearances without reaching the number-one (female) in BDS	Madonna scored a total of 16 songs, the most by any female and behind Busta Rhymes, T.I and 2Pac in the BDS period (started in 1992).
Most station adds and highest percentage of the sample in a week for a song	"Like a Prayer" was added by 234 radio stations and also scored the highest percentage of the sample of a song during its first-week (95%) in the CHR list of R&R.
Most station adds for a song during its first-week at Gavin Report charts	"Like a Prayer" was the most added song in the Gaving Report charts.

== United States and United Kingdom (simultaneous) ==
At some point of her career, the Guinness and British Hit Singles & Albums named Madonna the most successful female artist in both United Kingdom and the States. The 1988 edition of the Guinness, named her the "female leading vocalist" that has headed the single charts regularly in Britain and the US since her "Holiday" single in June 1984. Madonna is the first U.S. artist ever to go straight in at the top of the Official Albums Chart; she did it with True Blue.

She is one of the selected female artists to have one or more simultaneous UK and US number-one albums (True Blue and MDNA). She is indeed, the first female artist to have a simultaneous UK and US number-one album, with True Blue. "Like a Prayer" is also a simultaneous UK and US number-one single.

Madonna is the only solo artist, and the second act overall after the Beatles, to score at least ten number-ones on the Billboard 200, the Billboard Hot 100, the UK Albums Chart, and the UK Singles Chart. The table below lists all of her chart-topping albums and singles.

Number	Billboard 200	Billboard Hot 100	UK Albums Chart	UK Singles Chart
1	Like a Virgin (February 9, 1985)	"Like a Virgin" (December 22, 1984)	Like a Virgin (September 21, 1985)	"Into the Groove" (August 3, 1985)
2	True Blue (August 16, 1986)	"Crazy for You" (May 11, 1985)	True Blue (July 12, 1986)	"Papa Don't Preach" (July 12, 1986)
3	Like a Prayer (April 22, 1989)	"Live to Tell" (June 7, 1986)	Like a Prayer (April 1, 1989)	"True Blue" (October 11, 1986)
4	Music (October 7, 2000)	"Papa Don't Preach" (August 16, 1986)	The Immaculate Collection (November 24, 1990)	"La Isla Bonita" (April 25, 1987)
5	American Life (May 10, 2003)	"Open Your Heart" (February 7, 1987)	Evita (February 1, 1997)	"Who's That Girl" (July 25, 1987)
6	Confessions on a Dance Floor (December 3, 2005)	"Who's That Girl" (August 22, 1987)	Ray of Light (March 14, 1998)	"Like a Prayer" (March 25, 1989)
7	Hard Candy (May 17, 2008)	"Like a Prayer" (April 22, 1989)	Music (September 24, 2000)	"Vogue" (April 14, 1990)
8	MDNA (April 14, 2012)	"Vogue" (May 19, 1990)	American Life (April 27, 2003)	"Frozen" (March 7, 1998)
9	Madame X (June 29, 2019)	"Justify My Love" (January 5, 1991)	Confessions on a Dance Floor (November 20, 2005)	"American Pie" (11 March, 2000)
10	Confessions II (July 18, 2026)	"This Used to Be My Playground" (September 2, 2000)	Hard Candy (May 4, 2008)	"Music"
11	—	"Take a Bow" (February 25, 1995)	Celebration (September 27, 2009)	"Hung Up" (November 19, 2005)
12	—	"Music" (September 16, 2000)	MDNA (April 1, 2012)	"Sorry" (March 4, 2006)
13	—	—	Confessions II (July 10, 2026)	"4 Minutes" (April 26, 2008)

== Selected other countries ==
Record title/Achievements	Notes
First North-American film screened in North Korea	In 2002, Evita became the first and only American film to be screened at the Pyongyang International Film Festival.
Most number-one singles at Los 40 (female and foreign act)	Los 40, the largest Spanish radio network has an influential pop chart, where Madonna scored 18 number-one singles, the most by any other female artist. With this number, she tied Camilo Sesto, and was later surpassed by only Alejandro Sanz and Miguel Bose, all of them Spanish artists. This makes also Madonna, the international artist with the most charted songs at number-one.
Most number-one singles in Spain	Madonna reached the sum 21 times, the most by any other act.
Most number-one singles on Irish Singles Chart by a female artist ±	As of October 2020, she is tied with Britney Spears and Rihanna as the female artists with most number-one singles in Ireland, with 8 each of them; with Madonna being the first completing that amount.
Most expensive concert tickets – Mexico	Outlets like Radio Fórmula informed that her VIP tickets for her Rebel Heart Tour at Palacio de los Deportes are the most expensives recorded in the country.
Most expensive concert tickets – Singapore	The Straits Times reported VIP tickets for her Rebel Heart Tour as the most expensives recorded in the country.
Most expensive concert tickets – Taiwan	Her Rebel Heart Tour set this record.
Fastest-selling concert (tour) — Estonia	Madonna sold 70,300 tickets for her Sticky & Sweet Tour in about 24-hours, less time that previous-record holder, Metallica whom took 3 days in 2006.
Fastest-selling concert (tour) — Hong Kong	According to South China Morning Post, it is believed that the Rebel Heart Tour holds the national record for the fastest Hong Kong concert to sell out, which took just 30 minutes and prompted to add a second concert.
Fastest-selling concert (tour) — Mexico	Madonna sold-out in 47 minutes the first of two dates in the Foro Sol for her Sticky & Sweet Tour. It took one-hour and fifteen minutes, to sell more than 100,000 tickets (for her two dates), less than the previous U2 record of 3 hours for the same amount as part of their 2006 concert.
Fastest-selling concert (tour) — Portugal	In 2004, she sold-out in nine hours tickets for her Re-Invention World Tour gig.
Fastest-selling concert (tour) — Romania	According to Vodafone, the Sticky & Sweet Tour received the highest demand for tickets and, at the same time, the fastest sale, compared to any other show organized in Romania.
Largest audience ever recorded in a show – Switzerland	After selling 72,000 tickets for the Zurich's Dübendorf airfield concert as part of the Sticky & Sweet Tour, Madonna registered the biggest audience at any type of show in Switzerland from a single event.
Largest audience ever recorded in O2 Arena — Czech Republic	In 2009, with drawing a crowd of approximately 36,000 for two gigs.
Highest-grossing multiple shows – Sweden	After selling over 119,000 tickets for her two shows in Gothenburg during the Sticky & Sweet Tour, set the record as the highest-grossing multiple shows in the country's history.

== Madonna at chart anniversary-lists ==
Madonna was placed high in record charts of various major musical markets, either as soloist or female artist. Madonna is the first female artist ranked in Billboard's "Greatest Pop Stars" (created in 1981). She is also, the first artist to repeat as a year's "Greatest Pop Star": in 1985 and again in 1989.

In a multiple-decades long period, Madonna was nicknamed variously for her success in different formats, including Billboard staffers calling her as the "Queen of Charts", "Queen of the Hot 100", the "Queen of Dance Clubs", "Queen of Touring", or the first Queen of the Longform videos. Forbes' contributor Hugh McIntyre named Madonna the "Queen of Billboard charts" in 2020, while Music & Media called her an "Airplay queen". Devon Maloney from Spin headlined her as the "Queen of Album sales", and The Daily Telegraph called her a "chart queen".

Record title/Achievements	Region	Notes
Most successful singles artist	Germany	At the 40th anniversary of Germany's GfK Media Control Charts (2017), Madonna was listed as the most successful singles artist in the chart's history.
Most successful solo artist	Canada	At the 30th anniversary of RPM in 1994, RPM said that by far she is the most successful female artist in their history. Priors year, in 1992, they placed second as the most successful artist, behind only the Beatles.
Most successful act at Music & Media charts	Europe	Up to 1986, Music & Media staff named Madonna the most successful artist ever in their history. In their 10th anniversary (1994), Madonna was awarded with Artist of the Decade, and named by far the most successful artist in the Eurochart Hot 100 Singles.
Most successful female artist	United Kingdom	The Official Charts Company has named Madonna "the most successful female artist in UK chart history". In January 2023, they proclaimed: "By any metric, Madonna still ranks as the most successful female pop star on the Official Charts".

Billboard's lists
Record title/Achievements	Notes
Most successful US DVD chart artist ◆	According to the Guinness, all of Madonna's 15 US Music DVD chart entries have entered the Top 5.
Most successful solo artist in the Billboard Hot 100	At the 50th anniversary in 2008, Madonna was placed second behind the Beatles, as the most successful act of the Billboard Hot 100. Same situation with 2013, 2015 and 2018 updates. She remains at the same position as of 2022.
Most successful act of the Dance Club Songs	Madonna was placed atop in their list Greatest of All Time Top Dance Club Artists.
Billboard 200 artists	During the period of August 17, 1963, to October 10, 2015, Madonna was placed at number 17. At that time, she scored 8 topper albums then the seventh largest amount up that point, and second behind Barbra Streisand among the females.
Greatest Chart All-Stars	In 2019, Madonna was placed at number 5 in the Billboard's Top 125 Artists of All Time chart, a combination of success at Billboard 200 and the Hot 100 singles. Among females ranked, Madonna was placed second behind Mariah Carey.
Top 50 Adult Contemporary Artists Ever	In 2011, Madonna was placed at number 30 in their AC'S Top Artists.
Top Mainstream Top 40 Artists	In the period 1992–2012, Madonna was placed at number 10.
Greatest of All Time Pop Songs Artists	Madonna ranks at 16 in this list.

== Critic lists ==
Madonna on selected music critic lists and publications (all-time/century) (Note: Listicles limited to only ten publications.)
Year/era	Publication(s)	List or Work	Rank	Ref.
1999	HMV/Channel 4	Best Female Artist (last 1,000 years)	1	
2002	VH1	100 Greatest Women in Music (Poll)	1	
2012	VH1	100 Greatest Women in Music	1	
2003	VH1	50 Greatest Women of the Video Era	1	
2009	Encyclopædia Britannica, Inc.	The 100 Most Influential Musicians of All Time	n/a	
2015	The Daily Telegraph	Pop's 20 Greatest Female Artists	1	
2018	The Daily Telegraph	The 60 Greatest Female Singer-Songwriters of All Time	13	
2020	Billboard	100 Greatest Music Video Artists of All Time	1	
2020	Spin	The Most Influential Artists	3	
2021	Spin	The 40 Greatest Music Video Artists	4	

Mark Bego said that she appeared in several magazine's lists and mentions of "the biggest, best, and most defining events and creative productions of the century" (xx). In American Icons (2006), associate professor Diane Pecknold also noted how many polls of "the biggest, greatest, or best in popular culture includes her name".

== Records about and inspired in Madonna ==
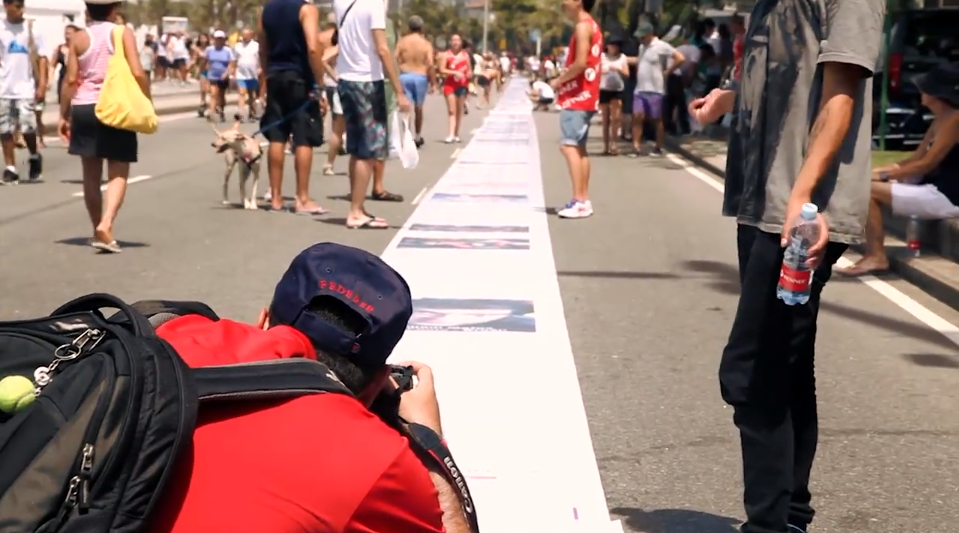
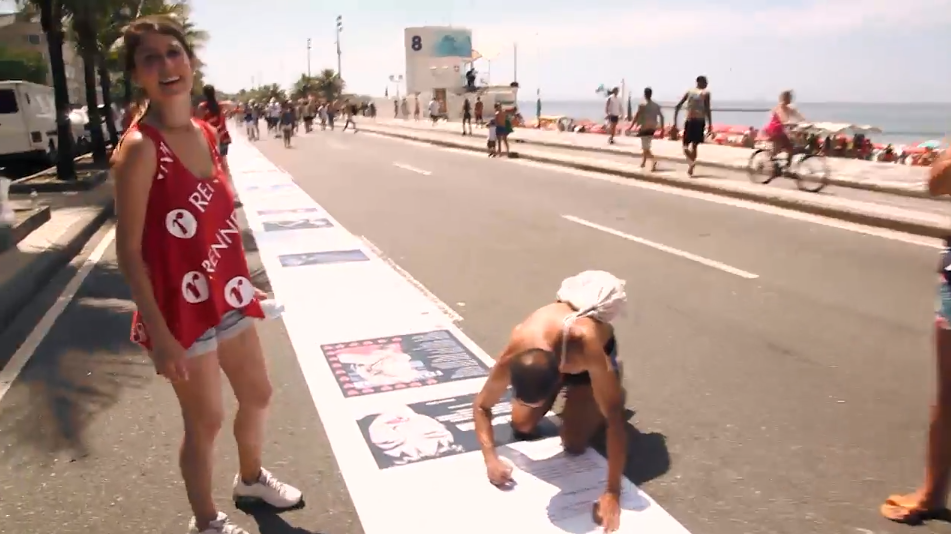
Two perspectives taken from the fan letter written by her Brazilian fans, the largest ever worldwide

Madonna as a subject has generated records titles by others ways in Guinness Book of World Records. They said: "You might not be able to run as fast as Michael Johnson, or sell as many records as Madonna but everyone can set a record".

Record title	Notes
Most valuable piece of Madonna clothing ◆	According to the Guinness, the most ever paid for an item of clothing belonging to Madonna is $19,360, for a corset designed by Jean-Paul Gaultier and sold at Christie's in London, England, in May 1994. Since then, numerous clothing belonging to Madonna achieved larger payments; an example occurred in 2001 during a Sotheby's online auction, for another corset sold almost at $24,000, then an overall record for an online purchase at that time according to ¡Hola!. Also, in 2014 Julien's Auctions grossed $252,000 from the Madonna's jacket worn in Desperately Seeking Susan.
Largest gathering of people dressed as Madonna at a single event ◆	According to the Guinness, 440 people who were dressed as Madonna on August 30, 2014, attended the annual Fool's Paradise Drag Party at the Fire Island Pines, New York.
World's biggest fan letter ever written	Brazilian fashion retail Lojas Renner made with her fandom a one kilometre message in 2012.
Biggest collection of Madonna items ever to come to auction at one time	An auction of 150 items by Julien's Auctions in 2014.
Largest payment for a Madonna photograph sold in an auction	The Times of India reported that Christie's said the largest payment for a Madonna photograph in an auction was a Herb Ritts photo of True Blue's album cover sold at $15,000 in 2006. It was later surpassed in 2009 by a 1979 of a Madonna picture sold in $37,500 according to the same source. However, prior years, Christie's sold a Madonna shoot by Helmut Newton in $96,000 in Oct 2005.

== See also ==
- List of most expensive divorces
- List of highest-attended concerts
- Madonna in media: Records and feats on media formats
- Madonna and business: Records and feats about grossing and earnings
- Fashion of Madonna: Records and feats on magazine covers

== Book sources ==
- Bego, Mark (2000), Madonna: Blonde Ambition, Cooper Square Press, ISBN 978-0-8154-1051-5
- Blackwell, Roger; Stephan, Tina (2004). Brands That Rock. Wiley. ISBN 978-0-471-48344-1.
- Hall, Dennis; Hall, Susan G (2006), American Icons, Greenwood Publishing Group, ISBN 978-0-275-98431-1
- Knauer, Kelly (1998). Time 100: leaders & revolutionaries: artists & entertainers. Time-Life Books. ISBN 9781883013493.
- McAleer, Dave (2004). Hit Singles: Top 20 Charts from 1954 to the Present Day. Hal Leonard Corporation. ISBN 0-87930-808-7.
- Morton, Andrew (2002). Madonna. Macmillan Publishers. ISBN 0-312-98310-7.
- Sexton, Adam (1993). Desperately Seeking Madonna: in search of the meaning of the world's most famous woman. ABC-CLIO. ISBN 0385306881.
- Schönherr, Johannes (2012). North Korean Cinema: A History. McFarland & Company. ISBN 978-0-7864-6526-2.
- Thompson, Clifford (2020). Contemporary World Musicians. Taylor & Francis. ISBN 978-1135939618.
- Whitburn, Joel (1990). Top Pop Singles 1955–1990. Record Research. ISBN 978-0898200898.
