= Girlguiding BGIFC =

Former section of Girlguiding UK for British nationals overseas

- Dissolved: 2024
- Headquarters: Victoria, London, England
- Region served: UK military bases and British Overseas Territories
- Members: 2,600
- Parent organization: Girlguiding UK

British Girlguiding Overseas (BGO) (formerly British Guides in Foreign Countries, BGIFC) was part of Girlguiding UK, operated for British nationals living overseas. With an administrative base in Commonwealth Guide Headquarters in Victoria, London, it had around 2,600 members, in two groupings, one for British Guides in countries outside the UK, including on UK military bases abroad, and one for British Guides in British Overseas Territories (BOT). In April 2023, a change in operations was announced, with the BGO operation to be wound up. The operations in non-UK countries ended by 1 September 2023, while those in British Overseas Territories were to end by 31 December 2023, but have now been continued within Girlguiding North West England Region.

== Purpose and approach ==
Members in this section of Girlguiding UK followed the normal programme very closely, with girls making the same promise as girls in the UK.

Girlguiding BGIFC also supported Lone Guiding. If a British girl living abroad wished to be a member of Girlguiding UK at any age level and had no group, then she could become a lone guide. Girlguiding BGIFC's lone guides interacted by post and email and were encouraged to attend the biennial camps.

=== Galleon badge ===
All Girlguiding BGIFC members wore the galleon badge on their uniform. The badge depicted a galleon sailing across the ocean. The colours of the Union Flag, red, white and blue, are all present. The ship symbolised Guiding overseas. The red cross on the white mainsail is a crusader cross, symbolising the adventurous and crusading spirit of the people who leave their home country to live and work abroad.

Originally the metal Galleon badges were hand-painted, with the country's name displayed on a scroll beneath the blue waves of the sea. Later, as BGIFC spread, individual hand painting was no longer possible and the galleon badges became mass-produced.

== History ==
British Girlguiding Overseas traced its origins back to the 1st Peninsular Guide Company in Porto, Portugal. This company started in 1911, but was not registered until 1913. The majority of Units were registered after 1950, although many went back much further than this. The first Lone Unit was formed in 1985.

On 1 April 1986, BGIFC was established as a Region of Girlguiding UK (now Girlguiding), similar to the nine UK "Countries and Regions"; this move gave BGIFC its own Commissioner, Advisors and Secretary. In July 2017 Girlguiding BGIFC was renamed as British Girlguiding Overseas (BGO).

In April 2023, the Board of Trustees of Girlguiding announced a decision to "change our overseas operations", which involved all units ceasing to be part of the UK girl guide organisation. The decision was primarily attributed to the difficulty of operating in many countries, each with its own laws and rules around child welfare, safety and other matters.

== Counties ==
Girlguiding BGIFC had three "Counties": Benelux and France, Cyprus and Germany. Not all units were organised into one of these groupings.

=== Benelux and France ===
There were seven districts in the Benelux and France county, but not all units were in one of these districts.

=== Cyprus ===
There were three districts in the Cyprus County, based around RAF Akrotiri, Episkopi Army Garrison and Nicosia. Each district had its own District Commissioner. The majority of girls came from British Armed Forces communities, but Leaders were often from the expatriate community.

=== Germany ===
In 2007, Germany had 4 Divisions, 12 Districts, 1 Senior Section, 15 Guide Units, 22 Brownie units and 18 Rainbow units, ranging from Hamburg to Munich.

== Biennial camp ==
British Girlguiding Overseas ran a biennial camp in the UK. It is not yet known whether the continuing Girlguiding Overseas Territories county will run a camp along similar lines.

== See also ==
- Girlguiding UK
