= Scouting on the Isle of Man =

Youth movement in the Isle of Mann

Scouting in the Isle of Man is represented by the Scout Association of the United Kingdom. The association has its own campsite, Mullin ny Carty. Some of the Groups also have their own headquarters.

The Scout Association's Patron is the Lieutenant Governor, Sir John Lorimer, and its President is Peter Kelly.

Manx Scout logo prior to 2018

== History ==
The 1st Malew Group was the first Scout Group in the Isle of Man. Originally called 1st Isle of Man, the group was renamed because other contingents had become active. The Scouts' scarf and name tag are in red and white reflecting the close relations to the Air Scouts that they were originally.

== Close ties with Ireland ==
The Isle of Man has attracted Irish Scouts. This was particularly the case under the patronage of Sir Charles Kerruish who facilitated the use of his own lands for Scout camping. Many groups fostered personal friendships with the Speaker of the House of Keys. In fact in 1979, as part of the Island's celebration of the 1,000th anniversary of Tynwald, Sir Charles invited Irish Scouts to form part of the guard of honour for the arrival of Queen Elizabeth II. All uniformed personnel present, including the Irish guests, received a specially minted medal from the Queen. It was seen a great honour that, on arguably the largest celebration ever on the Island, the close link with Irish Scouting was emphasised, as they stood side by side with Manx Scouts and the large military presence who were there to honour both the Island itself and the Lord of Mann.

== World Scout Jamboree contingents ==
In 2007 ten Manx Scouts and a Leader attended the 21st World Scout Jamboree as part of the Cumbria and Isle of Man Unit.

In 2011 nine Manx Scouts and a Leader attended the 22nd World Scout Jamboree as part of the contingent with Scouts from Cheshire.

In 2015 three Scouts and one Leader attended the 23rd World Scout Jamboree in Japan as part of an Isle of Man/Merseyside contingent.

In 2019 the World Scout Jamboree was hosted by Canada, the United States and Mexico. Nine Scouts and one Leader attended the 24th World Scout Jamboree as part of Unit 41, Isle of Man/Cumbria.

Manx Scout badge with Triskelion

== Three Legs Challenge ==
The Three Legs Challenge is a hiking challenge open to all Scouts and Scout Network members. Those who undertake the challenge must walk 3 of the Island's long distance walkways within 12 months. Its name is derived from the Triskelion, the Island's national symbol. The routes are:

- Leg One - The Heritage Way: distance 10.5 miles.

Start at the Quarterbridge in Douglas and follow the Heritage Way along the disused railway line to Peel. Finish is at the Peel Heritage Centre.

- Leg Two - Bayr ny Skeddan (Way of the Herring): Distance 15 miles.

Start at Castle Rushen in Castletown and follow the Bayr ny Skeddan to Peel. Finish at Peel Castle.

- Leg Three - Millennium Way: Distance 26 miles.

Start at the bottom of Sky Hill, near Ramsey and follow the Millennium Way to Castletown. Finish at Castle Rushen. This hike can be completed in either one day or two consecutive days, camping overnight.

Hikes may be completed in any order, but all must be completed in the twelve-month period. It is possible to complete the hikes either way, e.g. hike from Castletown to Sky Hill to complete the Millennium Way.

Manx neckerchief with National motto

== Explorer Scout units and Scout Network ==
Scout sections for over 14s on Isle of Man include Onchan, Douglas, Northern and Southern District Explorer units, and the Isle of Man Scout Network.

== See also ==
- Bleimor (Scouting)
- Girlguiding North West England
