= High Tide in the Heartland =

Studio album by Phil Pritchett
- Released: 2006
- Recorded: 2006
- Genre: Rock-country
- Length: 32:30
- Label: Spitune Records
- Producer: Phil Pritchett

Professional ratings
Review scores
Source	Rating
Texas Music Times	(Favorable)
Best in Texas Magazine	(Favorable)

High Tide in the Heartland is the fifth studio album released by Texas singer-songwriter Phil Pritchett. This is the first studio album recorded at Phil's very own Trinidad World Recording studios in Fort Worth, Texas. The idea of the album was to capture the power of a live performance in a studio setting. In Phil's words:

If someone wants to set up the drum kit in the kitchen, fine. If you want to put an amp outside and record a guitar track until the police shut us down, okay. It's all about being free to do something you want and the space has a lot to do with that. It's inspiring, and it's much better than having some guy say 'this is how we do it here' or 'stand there and play this'. I have done both, and I much rather have fun and try things than do something 'right'.

The album generated favored reviews from local Texas magazines.

== Track listing ==
All songs written by Phil Pritchett except "Released" (B. Dylan) and "Locks" (Lucinda Williams)

1. Song of the Doorman- 3:18
2. She Don't Even Know the Real Me- 2:59
3. Blood Warm Rain- 3:18
4. High Tide in the Heartland- 3:23
5. Released- 3:30
6. Mary Had a Baby Boy- 4:50
7. Temptation's Gate- 2:43
8. Best Part of a Man- 3:26
9. Locks- 2:45
10. Where Do You Go When You Sleep At Night- 2:20
