= Madonna albums discography =

Albums by American singer

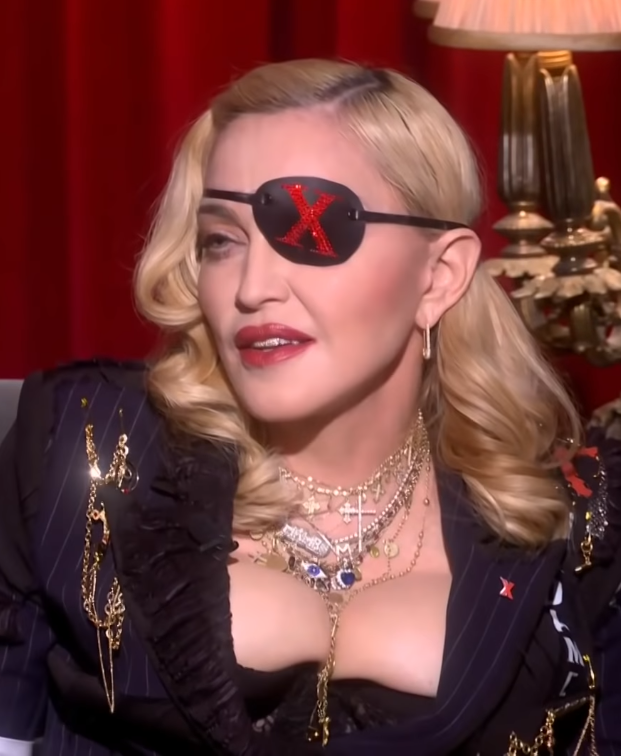
- Madonna during the promotion of Madame X (2019), her ninth number-one album on the Billboard 200.
- Studio albums: 15
- Soundtrack albums: 3
- Live albums: 6
- Compilation albums: 9
- Other charted albums: 12

American singer Madonna has released 15 studio albums, three soundtrack albums, six live albums, nine compilation albums, and 12 other limited releases. Madonna is recognized as the world's best-selling female recording artist of all time by the Guinness World Records, with estimated record sales ranging from 300 million to 400 million. The International Federation of the Phonographic Industry (IFPI) confirmed in 2006, that Madonna's albums alone had sold over 200 million copies worldwide. She is ranked by the RIAA as the best-selling female rock artist of the 20th century and fourth highest-certified female artist in the United States, with 65.5 million album units.

In 1982, Madonna signed a recording contract with Sire Records, a label owned by Warner Bros. Records. The first release under the label was her self-titled debut album, Madonna (1983). It peaked at number eight on the Billboard 200 and was certified five-time platinum by the RIAA. She followed the debut album with Like a Virgin (1984), which became her first chart-topper in various countries and was certified diamond by the RIAA. Her third studio album, True Blue (1986), reached number one in a record-breaking 28 countries and was once named the best-selling album by a woman of all time by the 1992 edition of Guinness World Records. During 1987, she released two albums that reached platinum status in the United States: the Who's That Girl soundtrack and her first remix compilation, You Can Dance. Madonna's fourth studio album, Like a Prayer (1989), made her the woman with most Billboard 200 number-one albums of the 1980s (second overall, behind only Bruce Springsteen).

Madonna entered the 1990s with the release of I'm Breathless (1990), which contained songs from and inspired by the film Dick Tracy, and her first greatest hits compilation, The Immaculate Collection (1990). The latter became her second diamond-certified album in the US and remains the best-selling compilation album by a solo artist with global sales of over 30 million units. In 1992, Madonna founded her own record label, Maverick Records, as a joint venture with Time Warner. She was paid an advance of $60 million and received 20% royalties from the music proceedings. This was one of the highest rates in the industry at the time, and was only surpassed by Michael Jackson who received 25% royalties. Her next releases under Maverick were the studio albums, Erotica (1992) and Bedtime Stories (1994), as well as Something to Remember (1995), a collection of Madonna ballads. All of them reached multi-platinum status in the US. Madonna scored her best-selling studio album of the decade with Ray of Light (1998), which sold over 16 million copies worldwide.

After charting five albums at number two on the Billboard 200 during the 1990s, Madonna returned to the top of the chart with Music (2000). The album sold over 11 million copies worldwide, of which four million were sold within the first ten days. She continued her chart-topping streak with studio albums American Life (2003) and Confessions on a Dance Floor (2005); the latter became a number-one album in 40 countries with global sales of over 10 million copies. In 2007, Madonna signed a 360 deal with Live Nation for $120 million. Her remaining contract with Warner Bros. ended with her eleventh studio album, Hard Candy (2008), and her career-spanning greatest hits compilation, Celebration (2009). Through her Live Nation partnership, Madonna signed a three-album deal with Interscope Records in 2011. MDNA (2012) was her first release with the label, which marked her fifth studio album to debut at number one on the Billboard 200. It was followed with Rebel Heart (2015) and Madame X (2019), the latter being her ninth chart-topper on the Billboard 200. In 2021, Madonna announced her return to Warner Music Group in a global partnership which grants the label her entire recorded music catalog, including the last three Interscope releases. Under the contract, Madonna will launch a series of catalog reissues beginning in 2022, to commemorate the 40th anniversary of her recording career.

== Studio albums ==
Title	Album details	Peak chart positions										Certifications	Sales
Title	Album details	US	AUS	CAN	FRA	GER	ITA	NLD	SPA	SWI	UK	Certifications	Sales
Madonna	Released: July 27, 1983; Label: Sire; Warner Bros.; Formats: Cassette; LP; CD; picture disc	8	10	16	8	28	50	7	35	—	6	US: 5× Platinum; AUS: 3× Platinum; FRA: Platinum; GER: Gold; ITA: Gold; NLD: Platinum; SPA: Gold; UK: Platinum	World: 10,000,000; US: 5,000,000; AUS: 250,000; ITA: 210,000
Like a Virgin	Released: November 12, 1984; Label: Sire; Warner Bros.; Formats: Cassette; LP; CD; picture disc	1	2	3	2	1	1	1	1	3	1	US: Diamond; AUS: 7× Platinum; CAN: Diamond; FRA: 2× Platinum; GER: 3× Gold; ITA: 2× Platinum; SPA: Platinum; SWI: 2× Platinum; UK: 3× Platinum	World: 21,000,000; US: 10,000,000; FRA: 600,000; ITA: 1,000,000 (Note: In Italy, Like a Virgin received a platinum award for the sales of 500,000 copies in 1986. The following year, it received an additional platinum with the same level-requeriments (making a total of 1 million certified units) despite that for new releases, a platinum was equivalent to 200,000 copies at that time.); UK: 1,000,000
True Blue	Released: June 30, 1986; Label: Sire; Warner Bros.; Formats: Cassette; LP; CD; picture disc	1	1	1	1	1	1	1	1	1	1	US: 7× Platinum; AUS: 4× Platinum; CAN: Diamond; FRA: Diamond; GER: 2× Platinum; ITA: 4× Platinum; NLD: Platinum; SPA: 3× Platinum; SWI: 3× Platinum; UK: 7× Platinum	World: 25,000,000; US: 7,000,000; FRA: 1,300,000; CAN: 1,000,000; ITA: 1,500,000; UK: 2,000,000
Like a Prayer	Released: March 20, 1989; Label: Sire; Warner Bros.; Formats: Cassette; CD; LP; picture disc	1	4	2	1	1	1	1	1	1	1	US: 4× Platinum; AUS: 4× Platinum; CAN: 5× Platinum; FRA: 2× Platinum; GER: 3× Gold; NLD: Platinum; SPA: 4× Platinum; SWI: 2× Platinum; UK: 4× Platinum	World: 15,000,000; US: 5,000,000; FRA: 800,000; ITA: 800,000
Erotica	Released: October 19, 1992; Label: Maverick; Sire; Warner Bros.; Formats: Cassette; LP; CD; picture disc	2	1	4	1	5	2	13	5	5	2	US: 2× Platinum; AUS: 3× Platinum; CAN: 2× Platinum; GER: Gold; NLD: Gold; SPA: Platinum; SWI: Gold; UK: 2× Platinum	World: 6,000,000; US: 1,989,000; FRA: 250,000; ITA: 250,000; SPA: 150,000
Bedtime Stories	Released: October 24, 1994; Label: Maverick, Sire; Warner Bros.; Formats: Cassette; LP; CD; picture disc	3	1	4	2	4	2	13	5	7	2	US: 3× Platinum; AUS: 2× Platinum; CAN: 2× Platinum; FRA: 2× Gold; GER: Platinum; ITA: 2× Platinum; SPA: Platinum; SWI: Gold; UK: Platinum	World: 8,000,000; US: 2,531,000; CAN: 250,000; ITA: 210,000
Ray of Light	Released: February 22, 1998; Label: Maverick; Warner Bros.; Formats: Cassette; LP; CD; MiniDisc; digital download	2	1	1	2	1	1	1	1	1	1	US: 4× Platinum; AUS: 3× Platinum; CAN: 7× Platinum; FRA: 3× Platinum; GER: 3× Platinum; NLD: 3× Platinum; ITA: 5× Platinum; SPA: 3× Platinum; SWI: 3× Platinum; UK: 6× Platinum	World: 16,000,000; US: 4,359,000; FRA: 1,000,000; ITA: 600,000; UK: 1,730,000
Music	Released: September 18, 2000; Label: Maverick; Warner Bros.; Formats: Cassette; LP; CD; digital download	1	2	1	1	1	1	1	2	1	1	US: 3× Platinum; AUS: 3× Platinum; CAN: 3× Platinum; FRA: 2× Platinum; GER: 2× Platinum; NLD: 2× Platinum; SPA: 2× Platinum; SWI: 2× Platinum; UK: 5× Platinum	World: 11,000,000; US: 3,031,000; FRA: 900,000; ITA: 250,000; UK: 1,630,000
American Life	Released: April 21, 2003; Label: Maverick; Warner Bros.; Formats: Cassette; LP; box set; digital download	1	3	1	1	1	1	3	2	1	1	US: Platinum; AUS: Platinum; CAN: Platinum; FRA: Platinum; GER: Platinum; NLD: Gold; SPA: Gold; SWI: Platinum; UK: Platinum	World: 5,000,000; US: 680,000; FRA: 600,000; ITA: 150,000; SPA: 70,000; UK: 335,115
Confessions on a Dance Floor	Released: November 9, 2005; Label: Warner Bros.; Formats: LP; CD; box set; digital download	1	1	1	1	1	1	1	1	1	1	US: Platinum; AUS: 2× Platinum; CAN: 5× Platinum; FRA: Diamond; GER: 3× Platinum; ITA: 4× Platinum; NLD: Platinum; SPA: 2× Platinum; SWI: 3× Platinum; UK: 4× Platinum	World: 10,000,000; US: 1,734,000; AUS: 200,000; FRA: 900,000; ITA: 400,000; SPA: 200,000; UK: 1,360,000
Hard Candy	Released: April 18, 2008; Label: Warner Bros.; Formats: LP; CD; box set; digital download	1	1	1	1	1	1	1	1	1	1	US: Gold; AUS: Platinum; CAN: Platinum; FRA: Platinum; GER: Platinum; NLD: Platinum; SPA: Gold; SWI: Platinum; UK: Platinum	World: 4,000,000; US: 751,000; AUS: 70,000; CAN: 169,000; FRA: 240,000; ITA: 175,774; SPA: 43,500; UK: 335,523
MDNA	Released: March 23, 2012; Label: Interscope; Formats: LP; CD; digital download	1	1	1	2	3	1	1	1	2	1	US: Gold; AUS: Gold; FRA: Platinum; GER: Gold; ITA: Platinum; NLD: Gold; SPA: Gold; UK: Gold	World: 2,000,000; US: 539,000; AUS: 35,000; FRA: 150,000; SPA: 30,000; UK: 134,803
Rebel Heart	Released: March 6, 2015; Label: Interscope; Formats: LP; CD; digital download	2	1	1	3	1	1	1	1	1	2	FRA: Gold; ITA: Platinum; UK: Gold	World: 1,000,000; US: 238,000; AUS: 15,000; FRA: 52,000; ITA: 60,000; UK: 76,490 (Note: UK sales figures for Rebel Heart as of June 2015. The album was later certified Gold in 2020, for sales of 100,000 units.)
Madame X	Released: June 14, 2019; Label: Interscope; Formats: Cassette; LP; CD; box set; digital download	1	2	2	4	5	2	2	3	2	2	ITA: Gold; UK: Silver	World: 500,000; US: 169,000; FRA: 29,000 (Note: French sales figures for Madame X as of December 2019.); ITA: 20,000 (Note: Italian sales figures for Madame X as of August 2019.); UK: 62,531
Confessions II	Released: July 3, 2026; Label: Warner; Formats: Cassette; LP; CD; digital download	1	1	1	1	2	1	1	1	1	1	CAN: Gold; ITA: Gold; SPA: Gold; UK: Silver	US: 114,000; UK: 61,624
"—" denotes items which were not released in that country or failed to chart.

== Soundtrack albums ==
Title	Album details	Peak chart positions										Certifications	Sales
Title	Album details	US	AUS	CAN	FRA	GER	ITA	NLD	SPA	SWI	UK	Certifications	Sales
Who's That Girl	Released: July 20, 1987; Label: Sire; Warner Bros.; Formats: Cassette; LP; CD; picture disc	7	24	4	2	1	1	1	4	4	4	US: Platinum; FRA: 2× Platinum; GER: Gold; ITA: 2× Platinum; NLD: Gold; SPA: Platinum; SWI: Gold; UK: Platinum	World: 6,000,000; US: 1,000,000; FRA: 600,000; CAN: 160,000; ITA: 450,000
I'm Breathless	Released: May 21, 1990; Label: Sire; Warner Bros.; Formats: Cassette; LP; CD	2	1	3	3	1	1	5	2	3	2	US: 2× Platinum; AUS: Platinum; CAN: 2× Platinum; FRA: 2× Gold; GER: Gold; NLD: Gold; SPA: 2× Platinum; SWI: Gold; UK: Platinum	World: 7,000,000; US: 3,000,000; ITA: 300,000
Evita	Released: October 28, 1996; Label: Warner Bros.; Formats: Cassette; CD; digital download	2	5	5	2	2	2	6	16	1	1	US: 5× Platinum (Note: The Recording Industry Association of America considers double CD as two different units, resulting in the quintuple platinum certification.); AUS: Platinum; GER: Platinum; NLD: Gold; SPA: Gold; SWI: Platinum; UK: 2× Platinum	World: 7,000,000; US: 2,025,000; CAN: 200,000; UK: 737,000

== Live albums ==
Title	Album details	Peak chart positions										Certifications	Sales
Title	Album details	US	AUS	CAN	FRA	GER	ITA	NLD	SPA	SWI	UK	Certifications	Sales
I'm Going to Tell You a Secret	Released: June 20, 2006; Label: Warner Bros.; Formats: CD+DVD; digital download	33	—	4	8	8	1	4	—	7	18	FRA: Gold	US: 85,000; ITA: 100,000; UK: 39,000
The Confessions Tour	Released: January 26, 2007; Label: Warner Bros.; Formats: CD+DVD; digital download	15	—	2	2	2	1	2	1	2	7	UK: Silver	World: 1,000,000; US: 148,000
Sticky & Sweet Tour	Released: March 26, 2010; Label: Warner Bros.; Formats: CD+DVD; Blu-ray; digital download	10	—	3	6	11	2	4	3	5	17	ITA: Platinum; FRA: Gold	US: 65,000; CAN: 6,000 (Note: Sales figures based in its debut.); UK: 12,405
MDNA World Tour	Released: September 6, 2013; Label: Interscope; Formats: 2CD; DVD; Blu-ray; streaming; digital download	90	—	—	6	—	2	50	4	—	55		US: 18,000; FRA: 8,000; UK: 23,220
Rebel Heart Tour	Released: September 15, 2017; Label: Eagle; Formats: 2CD; DVD+CD; Blu-ray+CD; digital download; streaming	— (Note: Rebel Heart Tour did not enter the Billboard 200, but entered the component sales chart at number 45.)	20	—	20	8	4	14	4	30	42	FRA: Gold	US: 3,840; FRA: 3,000
Madame X: Music from the Theater Xperience	Released: October 8, 2021; Label: Warner; Formats: LP; streaming; digital download	— (Note: Madame X: Music from the Theater Xperience did not enter the Billboard 200, but entered the component sales chart at number 58.)	— (Note: Madame X: Music from the Theater Xperience did not enter the Australian Album Charts, but entered the vinyl chart at number 14.)	—	90	—	— (Note: Madame X: Music from the Theater Xperience did not enter the Italian Album Charts, but entered the vinyl chart at number 5.)	—	67	—	— (Note: Madame X: Music from the Theater Xperience did not enter the UK Albums Chart, but entered the component sales chart at number 48 and the downloads chart at number five.)		
"—" denotes items which were not released in that country or failed to chart.

== Compilation albums ==
Title	Album details	Peak chart positions										Certifications	Sales
Title	Album details	US	AUS	CAN	FRA	GER	ITA	NLD	SPA	SWI	UK	Certifications	Sales
You Can Dance	Released: November 16, 1987; Label: Sire; Warner Bros.; Formats: Cassette; LP; CD; picture disc	14	13	11	2	13	1	3	16	11	5	US: Platinum; AUS: Platinum; FRA: Platinum; GER: Gold; NLD: Gold; SPA: Platinum; SWI: Gold; UK: Platinum	World: 5,000,000; US: 1,500,000; ITA: 450,000
The Immaculate Collection	Released: November 12, 1990; Label: Sire; Warner Bros.; Formats: Cassette; LP; CD; MiniDisc; box set; digital download	2	1	1	2	10	10	10	5	3	1	US: 11× Platinum; AUS: 14× Platinum; CAN: 7× Platinum; FRA: Diamond; GER: 3× Gold; ITA: 5× Platinum; NLD: 3× Platinum; SPA: 3× Platinum; SWI: Platinum; UK: 13× Platinum	World: 30,000,000; US: 10,000,000; AUS: 880,000; FRA: 1,100,000; ITA: 500,000; UK: 3,770,000
Something to Remember	Released: November 3, 1995; Label: Maverick; Warner Bros.; Formats: Cassette; LP; CD	6	1	4	3	2	1	19	6	7	3	US: 3× Platinum; AUS: 4× Platinum; CAN: 2× Platinum; FRA: 2× Gold; GER: Platinum; NLD: Platinum; SPA: Gold; SWI: Platinum; UK: 3× Platinum	World: 10,000,000; US: 2,281,000; ITA: 560,000; UK: 880,000
GHV2	Released: November 13, 2001; Label: Maverick; Warner Bros.; Formats: Cassette; CD; digital download	7	3	11	2	3	7	13	3	3	2	US: Platinum; AUS: 2× Platinum; CAN: Platinum; FRA: Platinum; GER: Platinum; NLD: Platinum; SPA: 2× Platinum; SWI: Platinum; UK: 2× Platinum	World: 7,000,000; US: 1,487,000; UK: 868,500
Remixed & Revisited	Released: November 24, 2003; Label: Maverick; Warner Bros.; Formats: CD; digital download	115	— (Note: Remixed & Revisited did not enter the ARIA Albums Chart, but peaked at number five on the ARIA Dance Albums chart.)	—	—	—	— (Note: Remixed & Revisited did not enter the FIMI albums charts, but charted as a single at number two. In Musica e Dischi album charts, it peaked at the number 16.)	—	—	80	— (Note: Remixed & Revisited did not enter the UK Albums Chart, but peaked at number nine on the UK Dance Chart.)		US: 114,000
Celebration	Released: September 18, 2009; Label: Warner Bros.; Formats: LP; CD; 2×CD; digital download	7	6	1	34	1	1	2	2	3	1	US: Gold; AUS: Gold; FRA: Platinum; GER: 3× Gold; ITA: 3× Platinum; SPA: Gold; SWI: Platinum; UK: 2× Platinum	World: 4,000,000; US: 274,000 (Note: US sales for Celebration as of July 2010.); UK: 666,000
The Complete Studio Albums (1983–2008)	Released: March 26, 2012; Label: Warner Bros.; Formats: 11xCD	—	—	—	26	63	19	48	44	52	70		
Finally Enough Love: 50 Number Ones	Released: August 19, 2022; Label: Warner; Rhino; Formats: CD; 3×CD; 2xLP; 6xLP; digital download	8	1	7	2	2	2	1	2	2	3	UK: Platinum	UK: 361,432
Veronica Electronica	Released: July 25, 2025; Label: Warner; Rhino; Formats: LP; CD; digital download	— (Note: "Veronica Electronica" did not enter the US Billboard Hot 200, but debuted and peaked at number 43 on the US Billboard Top Album Sales chart.)	33	—	44	12	20	20	18	10	23		
Bedtime Stories: The Untold Chapter	Released: November 28, 2025; Label: Warner; Rhino; Formats: LP; CD; digital download	—	20	—	102	—	42	—	12	—	95		
"—" denotes items which were not released in that country or failed to chart.

== Other charted albums ==
The following albums were only released in limited availability (certain territories or formats); do not contain any unreleased material or new recordings; and are not part of Madonna's core discography.

Title	Album details	Peak chart positions									Notes
Title	Album details	US Dance	FRA	GER	ITA	JPN	NLD	SPA	SWI	UK	Notes
Like a Virgin & Other Big Hits!	Type: Remix EP; Released: October 10, 1984; Label: Sire; Warner-Pioneer Japan; Formats: LP; CD	3	—	—	—	—	—	—	—	—	A four-track EP containing "Like a Virgin" (Extended Dance Remix), "Holiday", "Lucky Star" (Extended Dance Remix) and "Borderline" (Extended Dance Remix).
Dance Mix	Type: Remix EP; Released: 1985; Label: WEA; Warner Bros.; Formats: 12"	17	—	—	—	—	—	—	—	—	A four-track EP containing "Into The Groove" (Single Version), "Angel" (Extended Dance Mix), "Material Girl" (Extended Dance Remix), and "Holiday".
La Isla Bonita: Super Mix EP	Type: Remix EP; Released: May 25, 1987; Label: Sire; Warner-Pioneer Japan; Formats: LP; CD	—	—	—	—	7	—	—	—	—	A Japan-only EP containing "La Isla Bonita" (Extended Remix), "Open Your Heart" (Extended Version), "Gambler", "Crazy for You" and "La Isla Bonita" (Instrumental).
Remixed Prayers	Type: Remix EP; Released: August 23, 1989; Label: Sire; Warner Bros.; WEA; Formats: Cassette; CD	—	—	—	—	24	—	—	—	—	An EP containing various remixes of "Like a Prayer" and "Express Yourself" and cover artwork by Christopher Ciccone.
Vogue EP	Type: Remix EP; Released: September 25, 1990; Label: Sire; WEA Japan; Formats: CD	—	—	—	—	72	—	—	—	—	A Japan-only EP containing three remixes of "Vogue", two remixes of "Hanky Panky" and the album version of "More".
The Royal Box	Type: Box set; Released: December 4, 1990; Label: Sire; Warner Bros.; Formats: CD+VHS; Cassette+VHS	8	4	10	10	5	10	5	3	1	Limited edition US/European CD+VHS and US/Canadian cassette+VHS versions were released of The Immaculate Collection album and video which includes a satin cover digipack CD case with a poster and postcards in a 12"x12" box.
Rain EP	Type: Remix EP; Released: October 25, 1993; Label: Maverick; Sire; Warner Music Japan; Formats: CD	—	—	—	—	78	—	—	—	—	A Japan-only EP containing three versions of "Rain", "Waiting" (Remix), "Up Down Suite" (Dub), "Bad Girl" (Extended Mix) and four remixes of "Fever".
Ray of Light / Music / American Life	Type: Box set; Released: 2005; Label: Warner Strategic Marketing; Warner Music France; Formats: 3xCD	—	174	—	—	—	—	—	—	—	A 3-disc box set containing the album release of American Life, the 11-track version of Music (with "American Pie" bonus track) and Ray of Light.
Original Album Series	Type: Box set; Released: March 26, 2012; Label: Warner Bros.; Formats: 5xCD	—	156	—	—	—	—	—	—	194	A US, UK, Europe, Brazil and Japan 5-disc box set containingTrue Blue (remastered), Like a Prayer, Ray of Light, Music and Confessions on a Dance Floor.
The Complete Studio Albums (1983–2008)	Type: Box set; Released: March 26, 2012; Label: Warner Bros.; Formats: 11xCD	—	26	63	19	9	48	44	52	70	A limited edition European 11-disc box set containing all Madonna's studio albums between 1983 and 2008, with the first three being remastered.
American Life Mixshow Mix	Type: Remix EP; Released: April 22, 2023; Label: Warner; Rhino; Formats: 12"	6	—	—	—	—	—	—	—	—	A Record Store Day exclusive limited release for American Life 20th anniversary honoring DJ Peter Rauhofer.
Deadpool & Wolverine: Madonna's "Like a Prayer" EP	Type: Remix EP; Released: August 9, 2024; Label: Warner Music; Formats: Streaming; digital download	—	—	—	—	—	—	—	—	—	Madonna's "Like a Prayer" was used in the 2024 film, Deadpool & Wolverine, and was heavily featured in trailers and promotional material. On August 9, 2024, Warner released an EP containing variations of "Like a Prayer" for streaming and download.
Confessions on a Dance Floor Parts I & II	Type: Box set; Released: March, 2027; Label: Warner Music; Formats: LP	To be released									On November 9, 2026, the 21st anniversary of Confessions on a Dance Floor, Madonna announced a special boxset to be released on clear vinyl, with both 2005 and 2026 albums repackaged together.

== See also ==
- List of artists by number of UK Albums Chart number ones
- List of artists who topped the UK Albums Chart in four or more decades
- List of best-selling music artists in Finland
- List of best-selling Western artists in Japan
- List of highest-certified music artists in Germany
- List of highest-certified music artists in the United States
- List of best-selling female music artists in the United Kingdom
- List of best-selling albums
- List of best-selling albums of the 21st century
- List of best-selling albums by women
- List of best-selling remix albums
- List of best-selling albums in Argentina
- List of best-selling albums in Australia
- List of best-selling albums in Austria
- List of best-selling albums in Belgium
- List of best-selling albums in Brazil
- List of best-selling albums in Chile
- List of best-selling albums in Europe
- List of best-selling albums in France
- List of best-selling albums in Germany
- List of best-selling albums in Italy
- List of best-selling albums in Mexico
- List of best-selling albums in Taiwan
- List of best-selling albums in Turkey
- List of best-selling albums in the United Kingdom
- List of best-selling albums in the United States
- List of diamond-certified albums in Canada

== Bibliography ==
- Cross, Mary (2007). Madonna: A Biography. Greenwood Publishers. ISBN 978-0-313-33811-3.
- Glenday, Craig (2007). Guinness World Records 2007. Bantam Books. ISBN 978-0-553-58992-4.
- Kent, David (1993). Australian Chart Book (1970–1992) (Illustrated ed.). Sydney: Australian Chart Book. ISBN 978-0-646-11917-5.
- McFarlan, Donald (1992). The Guinness Book of Records 1992. Guinness. ISBN 978-0851123783.
- Metz, Andrew; Benson, Carol (1999). The Madonna Companion: Two Decades of Commentary. Music Sales Group. ISBN 978-0-8256-7194-4.
- Morton, Andrew (2002). Madonna. Macmillan Publishers. ISBN 978-0-312-98310-9.
- Rooksby, Rikky (2004). The Complete Guide to the Music of Madonna. Omnibus Press. ISBN 978-0-7119-9883-4.
- Ryan, Gavin (2011). Australia's Music Charts 1988–2010 (pdf ed.). Mt. Martha, VIC, Australia: Moonlight Publishing.
- Salaverri, Fernando (2005). Sólo éxitos: año a año, 1959–2002 (1st ed.). Spain: Fundación Autor-SGAE. ISBN 978-84-8048-639-2.
- Taraborrelli, J. Randy (2002). Madonna: An Intimate Biography. Simon & Schuster. ISBN 978-0-7432-2880-0.
