= Phil Pritchett =

American singer

- Born: Phil Pritchett; September 4, 1971 (age 54)
- Origin: Texas, U.S.
- Genres: Rock, country
- Occupation: Singer-songwriter
- Instruments: Vocals, guitar
- Years active: 1990–present
- Label: Spitune Records
- Website: philpritchett.com

Phil Pritchett (born 1971) is an American rock and roll musician from Texas. Members of his band have varied over the years. The current incarnation of the Full Band includes J.W. "Blu" Marshall on bass and Stu Wiley on drums.

== Biography ==
Pritchett's performance to his eighth grade class of The Beatles "Love Me Do" first inspired him to enter into music. He got his real musical start at age 13 starting a Van Halen-style cover band and started playing local parties. His original high school band the Suburbans was an acclaimed Texas rock trio before breaking up in 1990.

Pritchett graduated from Highland Park High School in 1990, and entered Southwestern University studying history. At Southwestern University in Georgetown, Texas, Pritchett formed the eclectic acoustic duo Romantic Embargo with friend James Dewitt. They played regularly in Austin and surrounding cities and made two recordings, a live tape "Cut Me Some Slacks" and a CD "Central Chilling Station No.5." Pritchett went out on his own in 1996 and spent 5 years living in Austin, Texas and playing his original music to fans all over Texas and the South and building a large regional fan base. He started Spitune Records in 1995 and began recording and releasing his music independently. After a brief stint in Nashville, he moved back to Texas and has been touring consistently since 2002, often playing 150 shows a year or more.

Some of Pritchett's live shows include "Song of the Doorman", "High Tide in the Heartland", "Luke Skywalker and Indiana Jones", "Colorado On Trial," "Tougher Than the Rest" and the all-time fan-favorites: "Maria," "Snuff Machine" (written by ex-Suburbans' member Wes Cunningham), "Antarctica U.S.A." (written by Dewitt now of the Residudes), and "Drink When I Think" and "Rolling" (both co-written with Chip Evans).

In 2006, Pritchett opened Trinidad World Recording in the Fort Worth Stockyards to self-produce his album High Tide in the Heartland. After the release of High Tide, he was asked to produce records for other acts at Trinidad. His producing credits include projects by Texas High Life, Johns Guns, Ty Wick, Magee Payne, Kurt South, J.D. Clark, Kyle Redd, Clay Thrash, Kevin Smith, Slow Rollin' Lows, Zach Huckabee, Mike Mathis, Notorious Gringos, Change of Standard and several of his own albums. Trinidad World Recording is now located in the old Handley post office in Fort Worth.

Pritchett has played with many of the fan favorites in Texas including Jack Ingram, Roger Creager, Honeybrowne and others.

In 2007, Pritchett began selling his albums in MP3 format for $4 each at p2tunes.com.

In 2009, Pritchett launched the P2 Podcast from his website. The weekly, hour long show delves into life as a musician, road stories, and discusses current challenges in the changing music business. He is frequently joined by guests, usually people he knows from his time in the industry including Kurt South, Pat Green, Pete Coatney (from Jack Ingram's band), Zach Huckabee, Buddy Huffman (Macon Greyson), Owen Temple, Wes Cunningham and others.

2011 marked the beginning of the "Trinidad Tribute" series. Pritchett teamed with Rodney Parker to cover five of their favorite R.E.M. songs on the inaugural EP.

== Discography ==
| Year | Album/CD | Record label | Description |
|---|---|---|---|
| 1996 | Philworld | Spitune Records |
| 1998 | Phil Comes Alive | Spitune Records | Live release |
| 1999 | Suburban Legends | Spitune Records |
| 2000 | Heritage Way | Spitune Records |
| 2002 | Bootleg: October Stages 2001 | Spitune Records | Live release |
| 2002 | Tougher Than The Rest | Spitune Records |
| 2004 | Cool and Unusual Punishment: Live | Spitune Records | Live release |
| 2006 | High Tide in the Heartland | Spitune Records |
| 2007 | Blueprint Garage, Volume 1 | Spitune Records |
| 2008 | The Bullfighter Returns | Spitune Records |
| 2008 | Blueprint Garage, Volume 2 | Spitune Records |
| 2009 | Mark of The Human Hand | Spitune Records |
| 2010 | Bootleg: Alive Alone 2009 | Spitune Records | Live release |
| 2010 | Blueprint Garage, Volume 3 | Spitune Records |
| 2011 | Trinidad Tribute: REM EP | Spitune Records | Duet album with Rodney Parker |
| 2012 | Corpus Christi Live | Spitune Records | Live release |
| 2013 | Ah, Yeah | Spitune Records |
