= Heritage Way =

Studio album by Phil Pritchett
- Released: 2000
- Genre: Acoustic-folk
- Length: 37.1
- Label: Spitune Records

Professional ratings
Review scores
Source	Rating
The Austin Chronicle	(Favorable) link

Heritage Way is the fourth album from Texas singer-songwriter Phil Pritchett. The album is noted for having a more personal introspective feel to it, having Pritchett playing most of the instruments and writing all of the songs. It is comparatively more acoustic-folk based than most of Pritchett's more rock-country based albums.

== Track listing ==
All tracks written by Phil Pritchett.

1. "Summertime"– 5:09
2. "Nowhere" – 3:10
3. "Julianne Part II"– 3:32
4. "Song For Keeps" – 4:00
5. "Life of Paul" – 2:39
6. "Guardian Angel" – 3:04
7. "Beautiful Day" – 5:12
8. "Feeling Port Aransas"– 3:34
9. "Stumbling Free" – 3:28
10. "Long Way Gone" – 3:21
