= The Complete Studio Albums (1983–2008) =

The Complete Studio Albums (1983−2008)

Box set by Madonna
- Released: March 26, 2012
- Recorded: 1982–2007
- Genre: Pop
- Length: 10:10:37
- Labels: Warner Bros.; Maverick; Sire

Madonna chronology
MDNA (2012)	The Complete Studio Albums (1983−2008) (2012)	MDNA World Tour (2013)

The Complete Studio Albums (1983–2008) is a box set by American singer-songwriter Madonna. It was released by Warner Bros. Records on March 26, 2012, to coincide with the release of her twelfth studio album, MDNA. The eleven-disc box set was released in Europe and Japan, and included all of Madonna's studio albums from the years 1983 to 2008. The album artwork consisted of a collage of the album covers, housed in a gold box. It also included a Parental Advisory sticker due to the original version of the albums Erotica (1992) and American Life (2003). On the same date, Warner Bros. released and reprinted another box set titled Madonna: Original Album Series which included five discs.

After its release, The Complete Studio Albums (1983–2008) received mixed reception from reviewers, who complimented the overall packaging of the box set, but hoped that the record label would have included Madonna's other popular songs that had not been on the original studio albums. The box set charted in multiple nations including Croatia, Finland, France, Italy, Korea, Mexico, Netherlands, Spain, Sweden and United Kingdom. It entered the top-ten of the Japanese Oricon album chart. The same week, MDNA was also present in the top-ten, making Madonna the first female artist from a Western country to have two albums in the chart's top-ten.

== Background ==
On March 6, 2012, Madonna's official website announced that her former record company, Warner Bros. Records (1982–2009), was to release and reprint the eleven-disc box set. It was released to coincide and on the same date as the 2012 studio album MDNA in the United States. The set includes every previous studio album Madonna had released; the remastered versions of Madonna (1983), Like a Virgin (1984) and True Blue (1986), plus the original versions of Like a Prayer (1989), Erotica (1992), Bedtime Stories (1994), Ray of Light (1998), Music (2000), American Life (2003), Confessions on a Dance Floor (2005) and Hard Candy (2008) with each disc housed in a cardboard sleeve. To complement the release of the box set, iTunes sold every Madonna studio album digitally for £3.95 for a limited time in the UK. On the same day as its release, Warner Bros. released another box set Madonna: Original Album Series which included five discs; the remastered version of True Blue, Like a Prayer, Ray of Light, Music and Confessions on a Dance Floor.

The box set also carries the logos for her other former record companies; Sire Records (1982–1995) and Maverick Records (1992–2004). It is her third greatest hits box set to be released after The Royal Box (1991) which was a limited edition of The Immaculate Collection (1990) and CD Single Collection (1996) which was released exclusively in Japan and included forty 3" CD singles, from "Burning Up" (1983) to "One More Chance" (1996), housed in a deluxe black glossy box.

== Critical reception ==
Professional ratings
Review scores
Source	Rating
AllMusic	3.5/5 stars

Mike Diver from the BBC News gave the box set a positive review, commenting that "this is pop history, a document of the most powerful female force in the music industry as she began her ascent, achieved superstar status, overcame a couple of hiccups, and ultimately landed in the '00s as every fledgling pop idol's ultimate mother figure." He also mentioned the absence of tracks "Into the Groove" (only available on the 1985 reissue of Like a Virgin), "Vogue" (from 1990's I'm Breathless) and "Justify My Love" (from 1990's The Immaculate Collection) may disappoint some fans. Robin Murray from Clash noted that while it traced "the evolution of a pop phenomenon", he felt it needed bonus materials. Andy Kellman from AllMusic was more ambivalent in his reception of the box set, stating that the release is more suitable for "voracious newcomers than longtime followers".

Describing the packaging, Kellman noted that it "was sharp but not elaborate – a clamshell box with each disc packaged in a paper LP-replica sleeve. While the box is a convenient and reasonably priced way to obtain most of Madonna's releases, an investment of that scope should entail all the stray hits from the same era. This really could have used a 12th disc", for adding all the other songs released by Madonna. The BBC described the packaging as a "no-frills affair—CDs are housed in cardboard sleeves that won't stand up to house-party punishment" Clash commented on the packaging more favorably, describing it as "fairly lavish".

== Commercial performance ==
In the United Kingdom, the box set debuted at number 70 on the UK Albums Chart with sales of 2,055 copies. Madonna's total album sales for the 21st century in the United Kingdom stood at 7,279,423, as of April 2012, making her one of the biggest selling acts of this period. It was certified gold in Poland by the Polish Society of the Phonographic Industry (ZPAV) for shipment of 10,000 copies of the box set. In France, the box set debuted at number 26 with 2,838 units.

In Japan it sold 13,000 copies and debuted at number nine (and MDNA at number four) making Madonna the first international female artist in Japanese chart history to have two albums in the top ten simultaneously and the first international artist in 20 years to achieve such feat, after Bruce Springsteen, who occupied two simultaneous top-ten albums in 1992 with Human Touch and Lucky Town. With this feat, Madonna has accumulated 22 top-ten albums in Japan, more than any other international artist. On the South Korean International chart, it debuted and peaked at number 81, selling around 200 copies.

== Track listing ==
The box set consists of Madonna's first eleven studio albums, from her career with Warner Bros. Records (1982–2009) and its divisions Sire Records (1982–1995) and Maverick Records (1992–2003).

Madonna (1983) – 2001 remastered version
No.	Title	Writer(s)	Producer(s)	Length
1.	"Lucky Star"	Madonna	Reggie Lucas	5:38
2.	"Borderline"	Lucas	Lucas	5:18
3.	"Burning Up"	Madonna	Lucas	3:44
4.	"I Know It"	Madonna	Lucas	3:45
5.	"Holiday"	Curtis Hudson; Lisa Stevens	John "Jellybean" Benitez	6:08
6.	"Think of Me"	Madonna	Lucas	4:54
7.	"Physical Attraction"	Lucas	Lucas	6:37
8.	"Everybody" (original version)	Madonna	Kamins	6:02
9.	"Burning Up" (12" version)	Madonna	Lucas	5:59
10.	"Lucky Star" ("new" mix)	Madonna	Lucas	7:15
Total length:				54:01

Like a Virgin (1984) – 2001 remastered version
No.	Title	Writer(s)	Producer(s)	Length
1.	"Material Girl"	Peter Brown; Robert Rans	Nile Rodgers	4:00
2.	"Angel"	Madonna; Stephen Bray	Rodgers	3:56
3.	"Like a Virgin"	Tom Kelly; Billy Steinberg	Rodgers	3:38
4.	"Over and Over"	Madonna; Bray	Rodgers	4:12
5.	"Love Don't Live Here Anymore"	Miles Gregory	Rodgers	4:47
6.	"Dress You Up"	Andrea LaRusso; Peggy Stanziale	Rodgers	4:01
7.	"Shoo-Bee-Doo"	Madonna	Rodgers	5:16
8.	"Pretender"	Madonna; Bray	Rodgers	4:30
9.	"Stay"	Madonna; Bray	Rodgers	4:07
10.	"Like a Virgin" (Extended Dance Remix)	Kelly; Steinberg	Rodgers; Benitez^{[c]}	6:08
11.	"Material Girl" (Extended Dance Remix)	Brown; Rans	Rodgers; Benitez^{[c]}	6:07
Total length:				43:10

True Blue (1986) – 2001 remastered version
No.	Title	Writer(s)	Producer(s)	Length
1.	"Papa Don't Preach"	Brian Elliot; Madonna	Madonna; Bray	4:29
2.	"Open Your Heart"	Madonna; Gardner Cole; Peter Rafelson	Madonna; Patrick Leonard	4:13
3.	"White Heat"	Madonna; Leonard	Madonna; Leonard	4:40
4.	"Live to Tell"	Madonna; Leonard	Madonna; Leonard	5:51
5.	"Where's the Party"	Madonna; Bray; Leonard	Madonna; Leonard; Bray	4:21
6.	"True Blue"	Madonna; Bray	Madonna; Bray	4:18
7.	"La Isla Bonita"	Madonna; Leonard; Bruce Gaitsch	Madonna; Leonard	4:02
8.	"Jimmy Jimmy"	Madonna; Bray	Madonna; Bray	3:55
9.	"Love Makes the World Go Round"	Madonna; Leonard	Madonna; Leonard	4:31
10.	"True Blue" (The Color Mix)	Madonna; Bray	Madonna; Bray; Shep Pettibone^{[c]}	6:40
11.	"La Isla Bonita" (Extended Remix)	Madonna; Leonard; Gaitsch	Madonna; Leonard; Chris Lord-Alge^{[c]}	5:27
Total length:				40:25

Like a Prayer (1989)
No.	Title	Writer(s)	Producer(s)	Length
1.	"Like a Prayer"	Madonna; Leonard	Madonna; Leonard	5:39
2.	"Express Yourself"	Madonna; Bray	Madonna; Bray	4:39
3.	"Love Song" (with Prince)	Madonna; Prince	Madonna; Prince	4:52
4.	"Till Death Do Us Part"	Madonna; Leonard	Madonna; Leonard	5:16
5.	"Promise to Try"	Madonna; Leonard	Madonna; Leonard	3:36
6.	"Cherish"	Madonna; Leonard	Madonna; Leonard	5:03
7.	"Dear Jessie"	Madonna; Leonard	Madonna; Leonard	4:20
8.	"Oh Father"	Madonna; Leonard	Madonna; Leonard	4:57
9.	"Keep It Together"	Madonna; Bray	Madonna; Bray	5:03
10.	"Spanish Eyes"	Madonna; Leonard	Madonna; Leonard	5:15
11.	"Act of Contrition"	Madonna; Leonard	Madonna; Leonard	2:19
Total length:				51:16

Erotica (1992) – Explicit version
No.	Title	Writer(s)	Producer(s)	Length
1.	"Erotica"	Madonna; Shep Pettibone; Anthony Shimkin	Madonna; Pettibone	5:20
2.	"Fever"	Eddie Cooley; John Davenport	Madonna; Pettibone	5:00
3.	"Bye Bye Baby"	Madonna; Pettibone; Shimkin	Madonna; Pettibone	3:56
4.	"Deeper and Deeper"	Madonna; Pettibone; Shimkin	Madonna; Pettibone	5:33
5.	"Where Life Begins"	Madonna; André Betts	Madonna; Betts	5:57
6.	"Bad Girl"	Madonna; Pettibone; Shimkin	Madonna; Pettibone	5:23
7.	"Waiting"	Madonna; Betts	Madonna; Betts	5:46
8.	"Thief of Hearts"	Madonna; Pettibone; Shimkin	Madonna; Pettibone	4:51
9.	"Words"	Madonna; Pettibone; Shimkin	Madonna; Pettibone	5:55
10.	"Rain"	Madonna; Pettibone	Madonna; Pettibone	5:25
11.	"Why's It So Hard"	Madonna; Pettibone; Shimkin	Madonna; Pettibone	5:23
12.	"In This Life"	Madonna; Pettibone	Madonna; Pettibone	6:23
13.	"Did You Do It?" (featuring Mark Goodman and Dave Murphy)	Madonna; Pettibone; Betts	Madonna; Betts	4:54
14.	"Secret Garden"	Madonna; Betts	Madonna; Betts	5:32
Total length:				75:24

Bedtime Stories (1994)
No.	Title	Writer(s)	Producer(s)	Length
1.	"Survival"	Madonna; Dallas Austin	Nellee Hooper; Madonna	3:31
2.	"Secret"	Madonna; Austin	Madonna; Austin	5:03
3.	"I'd Rather Be Your Lover"	Madonna; Dave Hall; Isley Brothers; Christopher Jasper	Madonna; Hall	4:39
4.	"Don't Stop"	Madonna; Austin; Colin Wolfe	Madonna; Austin; Daniel Abraham^{[c]}	4:38
5.	"Inside of Me"	Madonna; Hall; Hooper	Hooper; Madonna	4:11
6.	"Human Nature"	Madonna; Hall; Shawn McKenzie; Kevin McKenzie; Michael Deering	Madonna; Hall	4:54
7.	"Forbidden Love"	Babyface; Madonna	Hooper; Madonna	4:08
8.	"Love Tried to Welcome Me"	Madonna; Hall	Madonna; Hall	5:21
9.	"Sanctuary"	Madonna; Austin; Anne Preven; Scott Cutler; Herbie Hancock	Madonna; Austin; Hooper^{[c]}	5:02
10.	"Bedtime Story"	Hooper; Björk; Marius De Vries	Hooper; Madonna	4:53
11.	"Take a Bow"	Babyface; Madonna	Babyface; Madonna	5:21
Total length:				51:50

Ray of Light (1998)
No.	Title	Writer(s)	Producer(s)	Length
1.	"Drowned World/Substitute for Love"	Madonna; William Orbit; Rod McKuen; Anita Kerr; David Collins	Madonna; Orbit	5:09
2.	"Swim"	Madonna; Orbit	Madonna; Orbit	5:00
3.	"Ray of Light"	Madonna; Orbit; Clive Maldoon; Dave Curtiss; Christine Ann Leach	Madonna; Orbit	5:21
4.	"Candy Perfume Girl"	Madonna; Orbit; Susannah Melvoin	Madonna; Orbit	4:34
5.	"Skin"	Madonna; Leonard	Madonna; Orbit; DeVries	6:22
6.	"Nothing Really Matters"	Madonna; Leonard	Madonna; Orbit; DeVries	4:27
7.	"Sky Fits Heaven"	Madonna; Leonard	Madonna; Orbit; Leonard	4:48
8.	"Shanti/Ashtangi"	Madonna; Orbit	Madonna; Orbit	4:29
9.	"Frozen"	Madonna; Leonard	Madonna; Orbit; Leonard	6:12
10.	"The Power of Good-Bye"	Madonna; Rick Nowels	Madonna; Orbit; Leonard	4:10
11.	"To Have and Not to Hold"	Madonna; Nowels	Madonna; Orbit; Leonard	5:23
12.	"Little Star"	Madonna; Nowels	Madonna; DeVries	5:18
13.	"Mer Girl"	Madonna; Orbit	Madonna; Orbit	5:32
Total length:				66:52

Music (2000) – International version
No.	Title	Writer(s)	Producer(s)	Length
1.	"Music"	Madonna; Mirwais Ahmadzaï	Madonna; Ahmadzaï	3:44
2.	"Impressive Instant"	Madonna; Ahmadzaï	Madonna; Ahmadzaï	3:37
3.	"Runaway Lover"	Madonna; Orbit	Madonna; Orbit	4:46
4.	"I Deserve It"	Madonna; Ahmadzaï	Madonna; Ahmadzaï	4:23
5.	"Amazing"	Madonna; Orbit	Madonna; Orbit	3:43
6.	"Nobody's Perfect"	Madonna; Ahmadzaï	Madonna; Ahmadzaï	4:58
7.	"Don't Tell Me"	Madonna; Ahmadzaï; Joe Henry	Madonna; Ahmadzaï	4:40
8.	"What It Feels Like for a Girl"	Madonna; Guy Sigsworth	Madonna; Sigsworth; Mark "Spike" Stent	4:43
9.	"Paradise (Not for Me)"	Madonna; Ahmadzaï	Madonna; Ahmadzaï	6:33
10.	"Gone"	Madonna; Damian Le Gassick; Nik Young	Madonna; Orbit; Stent	3:24
11.	"American Pie"	Don McLean	Madonna; Orbit	4:33
Total length:				44:40

American Life (2003)
No.	Title	Writer(s)	Producer(s)	Length
1.	"American Life"	Madonna; Ahmadzaï	Madonna; Ahmadzaï	4:58
2.	"Hollywood"	Madonna; Ahmadzaï	Madonna; Ahmadzaï	4:24
3.	"I'm So Stupid"	Madonna; Ahmadzaï	Madonna; Orbit; Stent^{[b]}	4:09
4.	"Love Profusion"	Madonna; Ahmadzaï	Madonna; Ahmadzaï	3:38
5.	"Nobody Knows Me"	Madonna; Ahmadzaï	Madonna; Ahmadzaï	4:39
6.	"Nothing Fails"	Madonna; Sigsworth; Jem Griffiths	Madonna; Orbit; Stent^{[b]}	4:49
7.	"Intervention"	Madonna; Ahmadzaï	Madonna; Ahmadzaï	4:54
8.	"X-Static Process"	Madonna; Stuart Price	Madonna; Ahmadzaï	3:50
9.	"Mother and Father"	Madonna; Ahmadzaï	Madonna; Ahmadzaï	4:33
10.	"Die Another Day"	Madonna; Ahmadzaï	Madonna; Ahmadzaï	4:38
11.	"Easy Ride"	Madonna; Monte Pittman	Madonna; Ahmadzaï	5:05
Total length:				49:39

Confessions on a Dance Floor (2005)
No.	Title	Writer(s)	Producer(s)	Length
1.	"Hung Up"	Madonna; Price; Benny Andersson; Björn Ulvaeus	Madonna; Price	5:36
2.	"Get Together"	Madonna; Anders Bagge; Peer Åström; Price	Madonna; Price	5:30
3.	"Sorry"	Madonna; Price	Madonna; Price	4:43
4.	"Future Lovers"	Madonna; Ahmadzaï	Madonna; Ahmadzaï	4:51
5.	"I Love New York"	Madonna; Price	Madonna; Price	4:11
6.	"Let It Will Be"	Madonna; Ahmadzaï; Price	Madonna; Price	4:18
7.	"Forbidden Love"	Madonna; Price	Madonna; Price	4:22
8.	"Jump"	Madonna; Henry; Price	Madonna; Price	3:46
9.	"How High"	Madonna; Christian Karlsson; Pontus Winnberg; Henrik Jonback	Madonna; Bloodshy & Avant; Price^{[a]}	4:40
10.	"Isaac"	Madonna; Price	Madonna; Price	6:03
11.	"Push"	Madonna; Price	Madonna; Price	3:57
12.	"Like It or Not"	Madonna; Karlsson; Winnberg; Jonback	Madonna; Bloodshy & Avant	4:31
Total length:				56:34

Hard Candy (2008)
No.	Title	Writer(s)	Producer(s)	Length
1.	"Candy Shop"	Pharrell Williams; Madonna	The Neptunes; Madonna^{[a]}	4:16
2.	"4 Minutes" (featuring Justin Timberlake and Timbaland)	Madonna; Tim Mosley; Timberlake; Nate Hills	Timbaland; Timberlake; Danja	4:04
3.	"Give It 2 Me"	Williams; Madonna	The Neptunes; Madonna^{[a]}	4:48
4.	"Heartbeat"	Williams; Madonna	The Neptunes; Madonna^{[a]}	4:04
5.	"Miles Away"	Madonna; Mosley; Timberlake; Hills	Timbaland; Timberlake; Danja	4:49
6.	"She's Not Me"	Williams; Madonna	The Neptunes; Madonna^{[a]}	6:05
7.	"Incredible"	Williams; Madonna	The Neptunes; Madonna^{[a]}	6:20
8.	"Beat Goes On" (featuring Kanye West)	Williams; Madonna; West	The Neptunes; Madonna^{[a]}	4:27
9.	"Dance 2Night"	Madonna; Mosley; Timberlake; Hannon Lane	TimbalandTimberlake; Lane^{[a]}; Demo Castellon^{[b]}	5:03
10.	"Spanish Lesson"	Williams; Madonna	The Neptunes; Madonna^{[a]}	3:38
11.	"Devil Wouldn't Recognize You"	Madonna; Mosley; Timberlake; Hills; Henry	Timbaland; Timberlake; Danja	5:09
12.	"Voices"	Madonna; Mosley; Timberlake; Hills; Lane	Timbaland; Timberlake; Danja; Lane^{[a]}	3:40
Total length:				56:13

Notes

- ^{^a} signifies a co-producer
- ^{^b} signifies an additional producer
- ^{^c} signifies an additional producer and remixer

== Charts ==
=== Weekly charts ===
Chart performance for The Complete Studio Albums (1983–2008)
Chart (2012)	Peak; position
Croatian International Albums (HDU)	8
Czech Albums (ČNS IFPI)	13
Dutch Albums (Album Top 100)	48
Finnish Albums (Suomen virallinen lista)	45
French Albums (SNEP)	26
German Albums (Offizielle Top 100)	63
Italian Albums (FIMI)	19
Japanese Albums (Oricon)	9
South Korean Albums (Circle)	84
Mexican Albums (Top 100 Mexico)	62
Scottish Albums (Official Charts)	91
Spanish Albums (Promusicae)	44
Swiss Albums (Schweizer Hitparade)	52
UK Albums (Official Charts)	70

=== Monthly charts ===
Monthly chart performance for The Complete Studio Albums (1983–2008)
Chart (2020)	Position
Czech Albums (ČNS IFPI)	37

=== Year-end charts ===
Year-end chart performance for The Complete Studio Albums (1983–2008)
Chart (2012)	Position
Polish Albums (ZPAV)	64

== Sales and certification ==
Region	Certification	Certified units/sales
France	—	2,838 (Note: First-week sales)
Japan	—	13,000
Poland (ZPAV)	Gold	10,000^{*}
United Kingdom	—	2,055
^{*} Sales figures based on certification alone.

== Release history ==
Country	Date	Label	Format
Europe	March 26, 2012	Warner Bros.	Box set
United Kingdom	March 26, 2012	Warner Bros.	Box set
Germany	March 30, 2012	Warner Bros.	Box set
