= Girlguiding North West England =

Girlguiding North West England is one of the nine Countries and Regions of Girlguiding UK. It is further subdivided into 17 Girlguiding Counties. These are not the same as the counties defined by the British government. The region was introduced in 1960, covering the counties of Cumberland, Westmorland, Cheshire, Lancashire, and the Isle of Man, with British Overseas Territories added in 2023. Its headquarters are in Preston. It is also known, for example to the Charity Commissioners, as the Guide Association North West England.

In 2010, Girlguiding Isle of Man was the largest voluntary youth organisation on the Island, with 1300 members.

== Counties ==
Girlguiding North West England is subdivided into 18 counties. These are:

- Cheshire Border
- Cheshire Forest
- Cumbria North
- Cumbria South
- Greater Manchester West
- Isle of Man (not part of the UK but considered a county for Girlguiding purposes)
- Lancashire Border
- Lancashire East
- Lancashire North West
- Lancashire South
- Lancashire South East
- Lancashire West
- Manchester
- Merseyside
- Sefton
- Stockport
- Wirral
- Overseas Territories, comprising Anguilla, Bermuda, British Virgin Islands, Cayman Islands, Falkland Islands, Gibraltar, Montserrat, Saint Helena and Ascension Islands, Turks and Caicos Islands (not part of the UK but considered a county for Girlguiding purposes)

== History ==
The Lancaster Guardian reported a meeting in Lancaster in September 1917 to co-ordinate "various troops and companies of Girl Guides". Lady Baden-Powell attended the meeting and gave an address. In this she explained the objects of the Guiding movement, with particular reference to the World War I, at that time in progress.

In 2023, Girlguiding in British Overseas Territories was integrated into the structure of the Girlguiding North West England region.

== Centenary ==
An exhibition was held at Gawthorpe Hall to coincide with the Girl Guides' centenary to celebrate the contribution of Rachel Kay-Shuttleworth. Rachel Kay-Shuttleworth was the first County Commissioner for the Girl Guides in Lancashire and contributed to the movement on a national level. The exhibition displayed many items not usually seen such as Kay-Shuttleworth's hand-drawn designs for banners, guide badges and samplers. Original guide uniforms, badges and standards were also displayed to tell the story of the association of Rachel Kay-Shuttleworth, Gawthorpe Hall and Guiding in Lancashire.

=== Ultimate Isle of Man Challenge ===
One hundred Guides from around the UK walked one hundred miles around the Isle of Man's coast. The walk started on 21 August 2010. Manx Telecom donated SIM packs to the walkers enabling some of the participants to call home on their mobile phones to receive their GCSE exam results without incurring roaming charges.

== Camp sites ==
Waddow Hall Activity Centre is situated in this region in the Ribble Valley near Clitheroe. It has campsites, indoor accommodation, conference facilities, and equipment for a range of activities. It has been owned by Girlguiding UK since 1927 and is also used for training courses. The first training week at Waddow began on 28 September 1927, under the auspices of Alice Behrens, two days before the opening ceremony took place. Waddow is sometimes called the "Foxlease of the North".

In May 2023, Waddow Hall was listed for sale by Girlguiding.

== See also ==
- Scouting in North West England
- Scouting on the Isle of Man
