= Everybody (Madonna song) =

1982 single by Madonna

Single by Madonna

from the album Madonna
- Released: October 6, 1982
- Recorded: April 1982
- Studio: Bob Blank's Blank Tape (New York City)
- Genre: Post-disco; electro
- Length: 4:55
- Label: Sire; Warner Bros.
- Songwriter: Madonna
- Producer: Mark Kamins

Madonna singles chronology
"Everybody" (1982)	"Burning Up" / "Physical Attraction" (1983)

Alternate cover
- Cover used for the 40th anniversary digital and twelve-inch single release

Music video
- "Everybody" on YouTube

"Everybody" is a song written and recorded by American singer Madonna and produced by DJ Mark Kamins. In the early 1980s, while living in New York City and collaborating with former boyfriend Stephen Bray, Madonna recorded a demo containing four dance tracks, including "Everybody". Without a recording contract, she promoted the tape herself by visiting nightclubs and persuading DJs to play it. At Danceteria, she met Kamins, who championed the song after its enthusiastic reception on the dance floor and helped her secure a deal with Sire Records. After being introduced by label president Seymour Stein, Madonna signed with the label shortly after meeting A&R executive Michael Rosenblatt.

Recorded over three days at Bob Blank's Blank Tape Studios, "Everybody" was released on October 6, 1982, as Madonna's debut single and later appeared on her 1983 self-titled debut album. A post-disco song with electro and R&B influences, its lyrics promote dancing, self-expression, and inclusivity. Initial reviews were mixed, with critics praising the song's dancefloor appeal while criticizing its repetitive structure. Retrospectively, however, it has been cited among Madonna's best songs and one of the greatest debut singles of all time. The single reached number three on Billboard's Dance Club Songs chart.

The single's cover omitted Madonna's image, leading some listeners to assume she was black. An accompanying music video directed by Ed Steinberg and filmed at New York's Paradise Garage featured Madonna performing alongside backup dancers and helped expand her profile beyond the city's club scene. Following a series of promotional appearances in late 1982 and early 1983, "Everybody" was performed on three of Madonna's concert tours, the last being the Celebration Tour (2023–2024).

== Background ==
"I liked the hook, I liked Madonna's voice, I liked the feel, and I liked the name Madonna. [...] I reached over and called up Mark [Kamins]. 'Can I meet you and Madonna?'"

— Sire Records president Seymour Stein recalls hearing "Everybody" for the first time.

By late 1980, Madonna was performing with Dan and Ed Gilroy's band Breakfast Club, first as a drummer and later as a guitarist, appearing at downtown Manhattan venues such as CBGB. Although she enjoyed the exposure, tensions arose as her ambitions and growing stage presence increasingly clashed with the group's dynamic, leading her to leave the band. In November, she reunited with Stephen Bray, a former boyfriend and drummer from Ann Arbor, and the pair formed the band Emmy. After securing a showcase at Max's Kansas City in 1981, they attracted the interest of Gotham Records, but negotiations collapsed when the label pushed for a rock-oriented sound while Madonna insisted on pursuing dance music. Immersed in New York's club scene, she studied emerging dance trends to inform her own songwriting and performance style, and with Bray recorded a four-track demo that included "Everybody", "Burning Up", and "Ain't No Big Deal". Madonna promoted the demo herself at local clubs, eventually bringing it to DJ and A&R executive Mark Kamins.

Impressed by "Everybody", Kamins began playing the track at Danceteria, where its enthusiastic reception on the dance floor encouraged him to help Madonna secure a recording contract. To strengthen their pitch to record labels, the pair recorded a new version of the song and agreed that Kamins would produce her first record should he succeed in obtaining a deal. After Island Records president Chris Blackwell passed on the song, Kamins took it to Sire Records president Seymour Stein. Stein subsequently directed him to Sire A&R executive Michael Rosenblatt, who first met Madonna at Danceteria in the spring of 1982 and signed her to the label shortly thereafter. The agreement called for the release of a twelve-inch single and provided a $15,000 recording budget, while Madonna would receive royalties and publishing fees for songs she wrote. Stein later formalized the deal from his hospital bed while recovering from heart surgery. Although the label initially wanted "Ain't No Big Deal" to serve as Madonna's debut single, dissatisfaction with the studio recording ultimately led Sire to abandon those plans in favor of "Everybody". While Bray hoped to produce the release, Stein selected Kamins, who initially declined the role and unsuccessfully attempted to recruit musician Kashif before ultimately producing a 5:56 twelve-inch version, backed by a 9:23 dub version.

== Recording and composition ==
"Everybody" (1982)
A 30-second audio sample of "Everybody" in which Madonna can be heard singing the refrain.

"Everybody" was written by Madonna and produced by Mark Kamins. Recording sessions took place in early April 1982 at Bob's Blank Tape Studios in Chelsea. Kamins recalled: "We did it in three days. We had a very small budget. The musicians were getting paid $300 an hour, but they got it right the first time". The session featured Fred Zarr and Dean Gant on keyboards, Ed Walsh on synthesizers, and backing vocals by Gwen Guthrie, Brenda White, and Chrissy Faith. Although Barry Eastmond was initially hired to arrange the track, his keyboard parts were later replaced by Zarr after disagreements over the song's polished R&B direction, helping give the recording a more club-oriented sound.

Musically, it has been noted a post-disco and electro song with R&B influences. (Note: Attributed to Billboard, OutInPerth, and Rolling Stone.) It features double-tracked vocals described as "gum-chewing" in tone and a distinctive use of reverb before the refrain. Built around a "funky" bassline that Matthew Lindsay of The Quietus likened to the work of Bernard Edwards and Sebastián E. Alonso of Jenesaispop compared to Blondie's "Heart of Glass" (1978), the track gradually expands with swirling synthesizers during its breakdown. Madonna herself described the lyrics as an invitation to dance and let go of inhibitions, conveyed through breathy spoken-word passages and direct appeals to the listener. The song opens with a flirtatious spoken monologue—"I know you've been waiting. Yeah, I've been watching you. Yeah. I know you wanna get up"—before giving way to a refrain urging "everybody" to "come on, dance and sing" and "get up and do your thing". (Note: Attributed to author Elon Green, The Arizona Republic, The Quietus, The Independent, Rolling Stone, and The Ann Arbor News.)

Author Matthew Rettenmund wrote that the song introduced themes of individuality, dancing and singing as forms of self-expression, as well as the optimistic tone that characterized much of Madonna's early work. He also identified it as an early example of her use of a spoken "vocal rap" to establish a direct rapport with listeners. Other writers have similarly viewed "Everybody" as an early blueprint for Madonna's artistic identity, highlighting its themes of inclusivity, self-expression, and the dance-floor ethos that would remain central to her work throughout her career. (Note: Attributed to author Daryl Easlea, Santiago Fouz-Hernández, Billboard, Gay Star News, and Slant Magazine.)

== Release and chart performance ==
"I was living on the Upper West Side, 99th and Riverside, and about 7:00 at night I had the radio on in my bedroom, on WKTU, and I heard 'Everybody'. I said, 'Oh, my God, that's me coming out of that box'. It was an amazing feeling".

— Madonna discussing the first time she heard "Everybody" played on the radio.

The twelve-inch single of "Everybody" was released on October 6, 1982. Its cover artwork, designed by Lou Beach, featured a collage assembled from magazine clippings after Warner Bros. instructed him to create a scene depicting "everyday people in the street". The sleeve omitted Madonna's image as part of a marketing strategy devised by Rosenblatt, who believed the song's R&B influences would appeal to black radio and club audiences. As a result, some listeners assumed Madonna was black, with a contemporary Billboard review mistakenly describing the singer as a "young New York duo". The ambiguity surrounding Madonna's identity contrasted sharply with her later status as what Lindsay of called "the face of the '80s".

The song debuted at number 40 on Billboard's Dance Club Songs chart on November 6, 1982, and reached a peak of number three in January 1983, spending 17 weeks on the survey. It also reached number seven on the Bubbling Under Hot 100 after entering the chart at number nine in the week of December 25, 1982. New York radio station WKTU was the first in the United States to play the track, which had sold more than 150,000 copies by September 1983. Outside the United States, "Everybody" topped a Reykjavík popularity chart published by Icelandic newspaper Dagblaðið Vísir.

To mark the song's 40th anniversary, Rhino Entertainment released a limited-edition twelve-inch reissue on November 25, 2022, featuring updated artwork and both the original and dub versions of the track. This release reached number 22 on the UK Singles Sales Chart and number two on the UK Vinyl Sales Chart. "Everybody" has since appeared on several Madonna compilations, including You Can Dance (1987), Celebration (2009), and Finally Enough Love: 50 Number Ones (2022).

== Critical reception ==
Initial reviews of "Everybody" were mixed. Brian Chin of Billboard described it as a "spare, bright cut", while Barbara O'Dair, writing in The Rolling Stone Files, called it "moody" and "hiccuping". Roger Le Lievre of The Ann Arbor News considered Madonna's voice to be "at its most interesting" on the song, while author Mark Bego highlighted its strong dance beat and high-pitched vocals. Writing in The Man Nobody Killed: Life, Death, and Art in Michael Stewart's New York, Elon Green described "Everybody" as a "thumping but unpolished" debut single. J. Randy Taraborrelli characterized the track as a "rhythmic call-to-party", and Rettenmund regarded it as one of Madonna's enduring staples that established her as a "Disco Queen". Writing for Billboard, Joe Lynch praised the song's darker, more sensuous atmosphere, which he felt set it apart from the rest of the album.

Other writers were more critical. Both Don Shewey of Rolling Stone and Melissa Ruggieri of USA Today praised Madonna's vocals and charisma, but found the song itself unremarkable. Author Daryl Easlea praised its sweetness but felt felt it "already sounded dated" by the time the parent album was released. Marcus Wratten of PinkNews viewed the track as historically significant, though not on par with later dance-oriented releases such as "Into the Groove" (1985) and "Music" (2000), and criticized its repetitive structure. Pete Bishop of The Pittsburgh Press felt it wasn't a "very challenging" song, and criticized Madonna's vocals as lacking character and sounding "nasal", "shrill", and "tinny". In The Complete Guide to the Music of Madonna, Rikky Rooksby offered a negative review, dismissing the song as "artificial, repetitive and uninspired". Larry Nager of the The Cincinnati Post panned its "idiotic" lyrics.

In retrospect, "Everybody" has been reassessed more favorably. Mark Lore of the Portland Mercury praised it along with "Burning Up" as "true gems, gritty New York anthems" that were overshadowed by Madonna's mainstream breakthrough hits, while the Dallas Observer called it one of her "purest, most groove-addled" recordings. Ed Masley of The Arizona Republic highlighted the song's embodiment of early-1980s dance-pop and Madonna's "youthful exuberance", while Stephen Thomas Erlewine observed that although "Everybody" now sounds like a "relic" of the era, it "hasn't lost its potency". Slant Magazine similarly praised its "shiny-and-new-for-'82 synths". Jenesaispop and Entertainment Weekly both regarded "Everybody" as ahead of its time, citing parallels to later songs such as "Justify My Love" (1990), "Erotica" (1992), "Music", and "Hung Up" (2005). "Everybody" has frequently been cited among Madonna's best songs and was named by Rolling Stone as one of the greatest debut singles of all time. (Note: Attributed to multiple sources, including The A.V. Club, The Arizona Republic, Billboard, TheBacklot.com, Entertainment Weekly, Gay Star News, Jenesaispop, Parade, PinkNews, Rolling Stone, and USA Today.)

== Music video ==
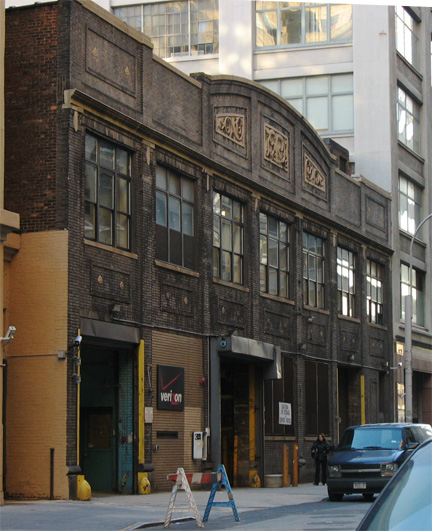
The video was shot at the Paradise Garage.

The music video for "Everybody" was directed by Ed Steinberg and filmed at New York's Paradise Garage. After seeing Madonna perform at Danceteria, Rosenblatt commissioned a promotional video to showcase the singer's music and stage presence to the label's staff and regional promotion teams. Rosenblatt hired Steinberg, who operated the Rock America video service, and allocated a budget of $1,500 for the production. Although the video was initially conceived as a recording of one of Madonna's live performances, Steinberg instead proposed filming at Paradise Garage, as he could secure free access to the venue. The finished clip features Madonna performing alongside dancers Erika Belle and Bags Rilez.

The production relied heavily on Madonna's circle of friends. Actress Debi Mazar provided makeup and also appeared among the dancers in the crowd, while additional friends were recruited as audience extras. Copies of the video were later distributed to clubs across the United States that screened music videos, helping expand the single's exposure beyond New York. Madonna subsequently remarked that videos were crucial to her early promotion because they "take the place of touring" by providing nationwide visibility.

Reception to the video was generally positive. Rettenmund found the video "mesmerizing" despite its modest production values and distinctly early-1980s aesthetic, describing Madonna's appearance as that of a "go-go gone bad". Carol Gnojewski characterized it as a low-budget promotional effort focused primarily on disco culture, while Fab Five Freddy credited it with helping Madonna connect with more urban and diverse audiences. Slant Magazine wrote that "no one could have predicted that the drab, $1,500 performance clip, filmed at New York's Paradise Garage, would herald one of the most influential video artists of all time".

== Live performances ==
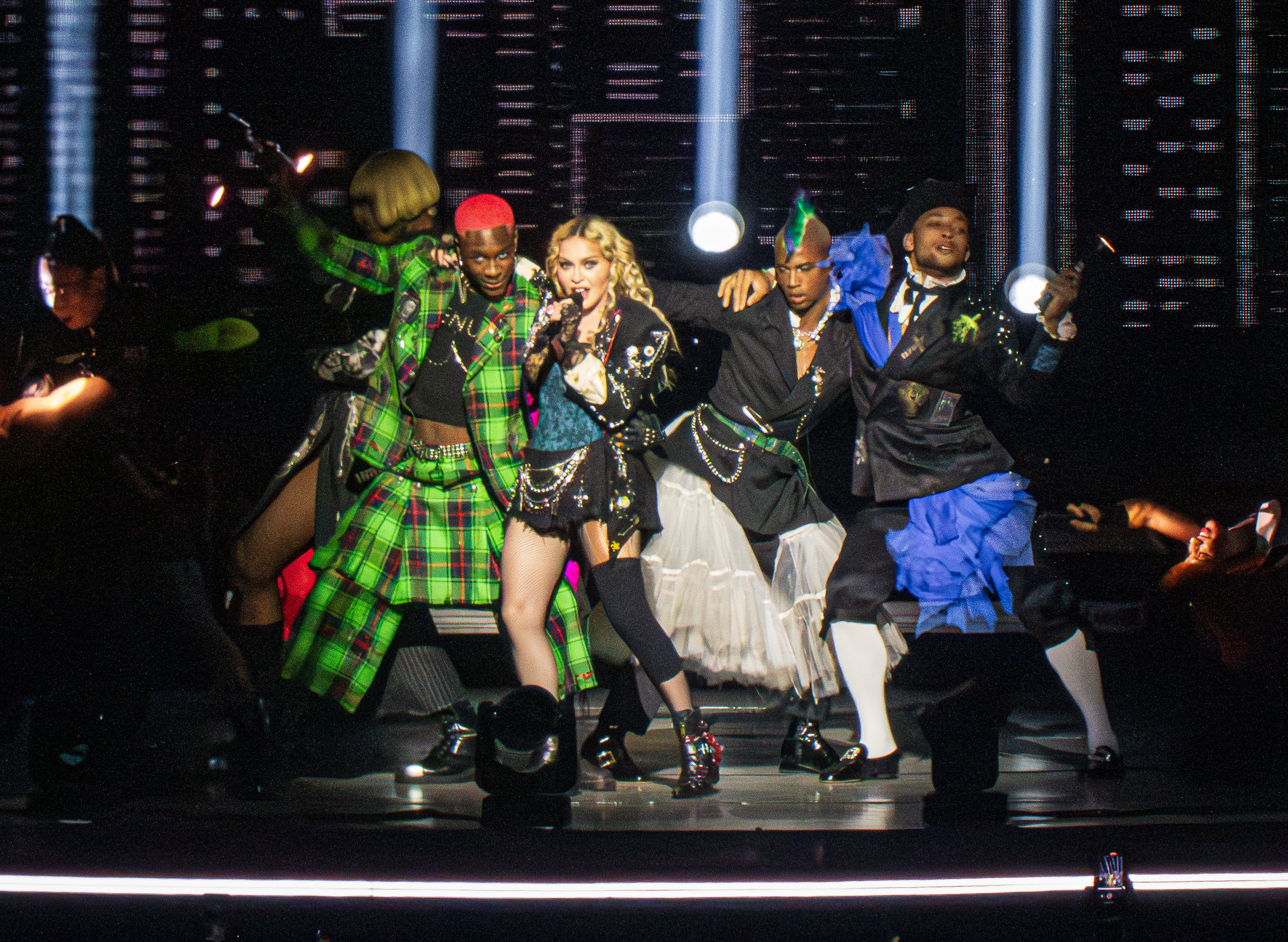
Madonna and her dancers performing "Everybody" on the Celebration Tour (2023–2024)

Madonna first performed "Everybody" on December 18, 1982, during Haoui Montaug's No Entiendes cabaret party at Danceteria. In early 1983, the song featured in her first solo television appearance, on American dance program Dancin' on Air. Additional performances followed at London's Camden Palace and at the Copa nightclub in Fort Lauderdale. "Everybody" went on to feature in three of her concert tours: Virgin (1985), the Girlie Show (1993), and Celebration (2023–2024). On the first one, she performed with two male dancers while playing a tambourine and wearing a fringed micro-top and skirt, a trilby hat, and crucifixes. At one point, she straddled a boombox and quipped, "Every lady has a box. But mine makes music". A recording of the performance at Detroit's Cobo Arena was included in the Madonna Live: The Virgin Tour video release.

While the full song was not part of the Blond Ambition World Tour (1990), the line "Dance and sing, get up and do your thing" was sampled during opening number "Express Yourself" (1989). On the Girlie Show, "Everybody" served as the concert's closing number in a mashup with Sly and the Family Stone's "Everybody Is a Star" (1969). Madonna and her dancers, dressed in denim and white, encouraged audience participation, creating what The Vindicator's Gary Graff described as a display of "joy and innocence" reminiscent of her early years. A rendition from the Sydney concert was featured in The Girlie Show: Live Down Under (1994) video release.

In 2005, Madonna performed "Everybody" at London's Koko Club, a rendition praised by The Daily Telegraph's David Cheal for its energy, and again at the 2006 Coachella Festival, where she appeared wearing a feather boa. Elements of the song were incorporated into the Sticky & Sweet Tour's (2009) performance of "Holiday" (1983).

To commemorate the song's 30th anniversary, Madonna performed it during the San Jose concert of the MDNA Tour (2012), an "off-script moment that inadvertently became the highlight of the show", as noted by the San Francisco Chronicle. During the Rebel Heart Tour (2015–2016), it was performed only at the Washington, D.C. concert as part of a slowed-down, Latin-infused medley with "Dress You Up" (1985), "Into the Groove", and "Lucky Star" (1983), a segment described by the Washington Blade as a "delightful surprise".

"Everybody" was the second number on the Celebration Tour, staged with Madonna and her dancers dressed as early 1980s punk-club patrons, performing beneath a New York City skyline. She wore a tailcoat designed by Dilara Fındıkoğlu, inspired by an outfit from a 1980s performance in Japan. According to the Chicago Tribune, the number evoked a "more buttoned-down era guided by conservative taboos".

== Formats and track listings ==
- US twelve-inch single
1. "Everybody" (Extended version) – 5:56
2. "Everybody" (Dub version) – 9:23
- UK seven-inch single
1. "Everybody" (Remix) – 6:16
2. "Everybody" (Dub version) – 5:59
- 1995 German CD single
1. "Everybody" – 4:55
2. "Everybody" (Dub version) – 8:58
- 40th anniversary twelve-inch single
1. "Everybody" – 5:56
2. "Everybody" (Dub version) – 9:23
- 2022 digital single
1. "Everybody" (7" edit) – 3:58
2. "Everybody" (Instrumental version) – 4:13

== Credits and personnel ==
Credits are adapted from the Madonna album and 12-inch single liner notes.

- Madonna – vocals, writer
- Mark Kamins – producer
- Butch Jones – synthesizer, engineering
- Christine Sauers – art direction, design
- Lou Beach – artwork

== Charts ==
=== Weekly charts ===
1982—1983 chart performance for "Everybody"
Chart (1982–1983)	Peak position
Iceland (Íslenski Listinn)	1
US Bubbling Under Hot 100 (Billboard)	7
US Dance Club Songs (Billboard)	3

2022—2023 chart performance for "Everybody"
Chart (2022–2023)	Peak position
Croatia (HDU)	4
Greece (IFPI Greece)	38
Hungary (Single Top 40)	2
UK Physical Singles	5
UK Singles Sales (OCC)	22
UK Vinyl Singles	2

=== Year-end charts ===
1983 year-end chart performance for "Everybody"
Chart (1983)	Position
Brazil (Brazilian Radio Airplay)	75

2022 year-end chart performance for "Everybody"
Chart (2022)	Position
Hungary (Single Top 40)	90

== Bibliogprahy ==
- Bego, Mark (2000). Madonna: Blonde Ambition. Cooper Square Press. ISBN 978-0-8154-1051-5.
- Clerk, Carol (2012). Madonnastyle. Omnibus Press. ISBN 978-2-909828-89-3.
- Cross, Mary (2007). Madonna: A Biography. Greenwood Publishing Group. ISBN 978-0-313-33811-3.
- Easlea, Daryl (2012). Madonna: Blond Ambition. Backbeat Books. ISBN 978-1-61713-034-2.
- Fouz-Hernández, Santiago; Jarman-Ivens, Freya (2004). Madonna's Drowned Worlds. Ashgate Publishing, Ltd. ISBN 978-0-7546-3371-6.
- Green, Elon (2025). The Man Nobody Killed: Life, Death, and Art in Michael Stewart's New York. Celadon Books. ISBN 978-1-250-89823-4.
- Gnojewski, Carol (2008). Madonna: Express Yourself. Enslow Publishing. ISBN 978-0-7660-2442-7.
- Katz, Mike; Kott, Crispin (2018). Rock and Roll Explorer Guide to New York City. Rowman & Littlefield. ISBN 978-1-4930-3704-9.
- Madonna: The Rolling Stone Files. Hyperion Press. 1997. ISBN 978-0-7868-8154-3.
- Morton, Andrew (2001). Madonna. Macmillan Publishers. ISBN 978-0-312-98310-9.
- Rettenmund, Matthew (1995). Encyclopedia Madonnica. St. Martin's Press. ISBN 978-0-312-11782-5.
- Rooksby, Rikky (2004). The Complete Guide to the Music of Madonna. Omnibus Press. ISBN 978-0-7119-9883-4.
- Taraborrelli, Randy J. (2001). Madonna: An Intimate Biography. Simon & Schuster. ISBN 978-0-283-07289-5.
- Wade, Ian (2024). 1984: The Year Pop Went Queer. Bonnier Books UK. ISBN 978-1-78512-082-4.
