= Madonna Live: The Virgin Tour =

Video by Madonna
- Released: November 13, 1985
- Recorded: May 25–26, 1985
- Venue: Cobo Center (Detroit, Michigan)
- Genre: Live
- Length: 55 mins
- Label: Warner Music Video; Sire; Warner Bros.
- Director: Daniel Kleinman; James Foley (introduction)
- Producer: Simon Fields

Madonna video chronology
Madonna (1984)	Madonna Live: The Virgin Tour (1985)	Ciao Italia: Live from Italy (1987)

Madonna Live: The Virgin Tour is the second video album and the first live release by American singer-songwriter Madonna. It was released by Warner Music Video and Sire Records on November 13, 1985 and contains the concert footage from The Virgin Tour, filmed at Cobo Arena in Detroit, Michigan on May 25, 1985. Director Daniel Kleinman, who presided over the shooting of the tour on video, submitted the footage to Warner Bros. Records, who decided to release it as a video album. Madonna wanted to have a proper introduction added before the concert footage and asked director James Foley to shoot one, which portrayed her with her first image makeover, reciting lines related to how she became famous.

After its release, Madonna Live: The Virgin Tour received mixed reviews from critics, but went on to become a commercial success, topping the Music Video Sales chart of Billboard and becoming the top selling music video cassette of 1986. The video was certified platinum by the Recording Industry Association of America (RIAA) for shipment of 100,000 copies and in September 1986, it received a "Video Software Dealers Award" for the Most Popular Music Video. The live performances of "Like a Virgin" and "Dress You Up" were released as music videos on MTV to promote the video album. Both videos were nominated for "Best Choreography" at the 1986 MTV Video Music Awards.

== Background ==
Madonna's first concert tour, The Virgin Tour, promoted her first two studio albums, Madonna and Like a Virgin. The tour was a commercial success, with Billboard Boxscore reporting a gross of US $3.3 million. After the tour was over, Madonna started recording her third studio album, True Blue. Film director Daniel Kleinman, who presided over the shooting of the tour on video, submitted the footage to Warner Bros. Records, who decided to release it as a video album. Madonna Live: The Virgin Tour chronicled The Virgin Tour as shot at Cobo Arena in Detroit, Michigan on May 25, 1985.

Madonna, who was busy with True Blue and shooting for the comedy film Shanghai Surprise, was contacted by Kleinman to ask about her approval of the shot footage. She felt that the video "needed a proper introduction. I asked [James] Foley darling to shoot me saying something for adding it before the concert starts." Foley, who directed the music video of her song "Live to Tell", shot an introduction which was added at the beginning of the video. It portrayed Madonna in her first image makeover, with platinum blond curls, and conservative wardrobe. Madonna wanted to include a summation of her biography—which was used at the beginning of The Virgin Tour—to be added with the footage. Hence, with the footage, Madonna's voice was heard, declaring,

"I went to New York. I had a dream. I wanted to be a big star, I didn't know anybody, I wanted to dance, I wanted to sing, I wanted to do all those things, I wanted to make people happy, I wanted to be famous, I wanted everybody to love me. I wanted to be a star. I worked really hard, and my dream came true."

This was followed by the concert, beginning with "Dress You Up". The performances of "Angel", "Borderline" and "Burning Up" were removed from the track list of the video, as Kleinman believed that Madonna's performance was not her best in them. While shooting the tour on May 25, during the performance of "Like a Virgin", a fan suddenly came up on the stage and tried to get hold of Madonna, but was swiftly whisked away by security. Kleinman decided to keep the shot, as he felt that it illustrated the fanaticism which had grown around Madonna, and her popularity. The live performances of "Like a Virgin" and "Dress You Up" were released as music video on MTV to promote the video album. Both videos were nominated for "Best Choreography" at the 1986 MTV Video Music Awards. However, Madonna lost the award to Prince and The Revolution with their video "Raspberry Beret."

== Reception ==
=== Critical response ===
Professional ratings
Review scores
Source	Rating
Entertainment Weekly	C−

The video received mixed reviews from critics. Annie Temple from Philadelphia Daily News said that the release was "not so flattering" and "was a sloppy job". Dennis Hunt from Los Angeles Times said that "the video is sometimes distracting and blurry, wonder what went wrong during recording. The angles are awkward, especially when the audience members are shown touching Madonna's hand. Was it really necessary to show a fan coming unannounced on the stage?" Terry Atkinson from the same paper said, "This follows the typical concert video format of putting you in the best seat in the hall and letting the aura of a superior performer encaptivate your senses." Sylvia Chase from The Wichita Eagle said that "seeing Madonna live in an arena and seeing her up, close and personal in the tour cassette is totally different. The energy, the movements, the provocation—all captures you more." Stephen Holden from The New York Times gave it a positive review, stating "filmed with abrupt, swooping camera movements that accentuate the singer's flouncing, slightly ungainly style of dancing, Madonna Live vividly captures the contradictory elements that have made the performer into a cultural icon in spite of a shrill, limited singing voice. In close-up, Madonna's provocative pouts, wiggles and come-hither glances become a more than half-deliberate burlesque of erotic centerfold photography. Both her post-disco music and defiant strut suggest a child's parody of grown-up posturing."

=== Commercial performance ===
The release debuted at 14 on Billboard's Top Music Videocassettes chart, on December 7, 1985 and climbed to number 11, the next week. The video started a slow climb on the chart, and on the issue dated January 18, 1986, it reached the top of the chart, replacing Prince & The Revolution: Live by The Revolution on the chart. On May 24, 1986, the video again climbed back in the top ten of the chart, at position two. It was present on the chart for a total of 65 weeks. Madonna Live: The Virgin Tour was the top selling music videocassette for 1986. The video was certified double platinum by the Recording Industry Association of America (RIAA) for shipment of 100,000 copies and received a "Video Software Dealers Award" for the Most Popular Music Video, in September 1986. By 1992, the release sold 35,000 copies of laserdiscs in the United States according to The Hollywood Reporter.

== Charts ==
=== Weekly charts ===
Chart (1985–1986)	Peak position
UK Top Music Videos (Music Week)	1
US Top Music Videocassettes (Billboard)	1
US Top 15 Music Videocassettes (Cash Box)	1

Chart (1998)	Peak position
UK Music Videos (OCC)	22

=== Year-end charts ===
Chart (1986)	Peak position
US Top Music Videocassettes (Billboard)	1
US Top Videocassettes Sales (Billboard)	28

== Certifications and sales ==
Region	Certification	Certified units/sales
Australia (ARIA)	Platinum	15,000^{^}
Japan	—	60,000
United States (RIAA)	Platinum	100,000^{^}
^{^} Shipments figures based on certification alone.

== Track listing ==
No.	Title	Writer(s)	Length
1.	"Dress You Up"	Andrea LaRusso; Peggy Stanziale	5:36
2.	"Holiday"	Curtis Hudson; Lisa Stevens	6:41
3.	"Into the Groove"	Madonna; Steve Bray	5:08
4.	"Everybody"	Madonna	4:32
5.	"Gambler"	Madonna	2:56
6.	"Lucky Star"	Madonna	4:54
7.	"Crazy for You"	John Bettis; Jon Lind	4:16
8.	"Over and Over"	Madonna; Bray	4:04
9.	"Like a Virgin"	Tom Kelly; Billy Steinberg	5:31
10.	"Material Girl"	Peter Brown; Robert Rans	5:59

Notes

- "Like a Virgin" contains an excerpt from "Billie Jean."

=== Formats ===
It was released on VHS and later on Laserdisc.

== Credits and personnel ==
- Daniel Kleinman – director
- James Foley – director (opening sequence)
- Simon Fields – producer
- Jerry Watson – cinematography
- Jan de Bont – cinematography (opening sequence)
- Mitchell Sinoway – editor
- Kenneth C. Barrows – camera operator
- Brad Jeffries – choreographer
- Rick Uber – online editor
- Limelight Productions – production company
- Steve Carlton – post-production sound supervisor

Credits adapted from the video's liner notes.
