= The Virgin Tour =

1985 concert tour by Madonna

- Tour by Madonna
- Promotional poster for the San Francisco concert
- Location: North America
- Associated albums: Madonna; Like a Virgin
- Start date: April 10, 1985
- End date: June 11, 1985
- Legs: 1
- No. of shows: 40
- Supporting act: Beastie Boys
- Box office: US$5 million (Note: US$14.97 million in 2025 dollars.)

Madonna concert chronology
- The Virgin Tour (1985); Who's That Girl World Tour (1987)

The Virgin Tour was the debut concert tour by American singer-songwriter Madonna. The tour supported her first two studio albums, Madonna (1983) and Like a Virgin (1984). It started on April 10, 1985, at the Paramount Theatre in Seattle, United States, and ended on June 11 of the same year at the Madison Square Garden in New York City. Although initially planned for an international audience, the tour was restricted to the United States and Canada. Warner Bros. Records decided to send Madonna on tour after Like a Virgin became a success. After an official announcement on March 15, 1985, Madonna and her team began production plans. She wanted the tour to be a reflection of her own self and collaborated with designer Maripol for the costumes.

Beastie Boys were signed as the opening act, while record producer Patrick Leonard was the music director. The stage was triangular, with walkways and ramps around it, with lighting arrangements hanging about 30 feet above. Four giant screens lined three sides of the stage's outer perimeter. The setlist consisted of songs from her first two records, Madonna and Like a Virgin. Madonna was backed by two male dancers as she moved energetically across the stage. The show ended with her in a wedding dress, performing "Like a Virgin" and "Material Girl".

The tour received a mixed reception from critics, but was a commercial success, with many newly-obsessed Madonna fans in attendance. As soon as it was announced, tickets were sold out nearly everywhere. Macy's New York department store created a "Madonna department", where shoppers could find not only official tour merchandise, but also clothing, jewelry, and accessories to replicate what was considered (at the time) to be the Madonna "style". The store was flooded with fans, who bought everything from chunky bracelets and bangles, scrunchies and headbands, to pearl necklaces and rings. The store also carried shoes, shirts, denim jackets, large sunglasses, and Madonna's "signature" accessories: rosary-style necklaces, crucifix earrings, fingerless gloves, and even a replica of her iconic belt, with the metal buckle carved to say "BOY" in all capital letters. On its end, the tour was reported to have grossed over $5 million ($14.97 million in 2025 dollars), with Billboard Boxscore reporting a gross of $3.3 million ($9.88 million in 2025 dollars).

The tour was recorded and released on VHS, Betamax and LaserDisc, as Madonna Live: The Virgin Tour, which received a gold certification by the Recording Industry Association of America (RIAA). With the commencement of the Virgin Tour, a wide-ranging audience—especially young women—thronged to attend, all nearly decked-out in Madonna-inspired outfits. This frenzy surrounding Madonna gave rise to a new term called Madonna wannabe—a reference to her obsessive followers (during the mid-1980s) that would be officially recognized by the Webster's Dictionary in May 1991.

== Background ==
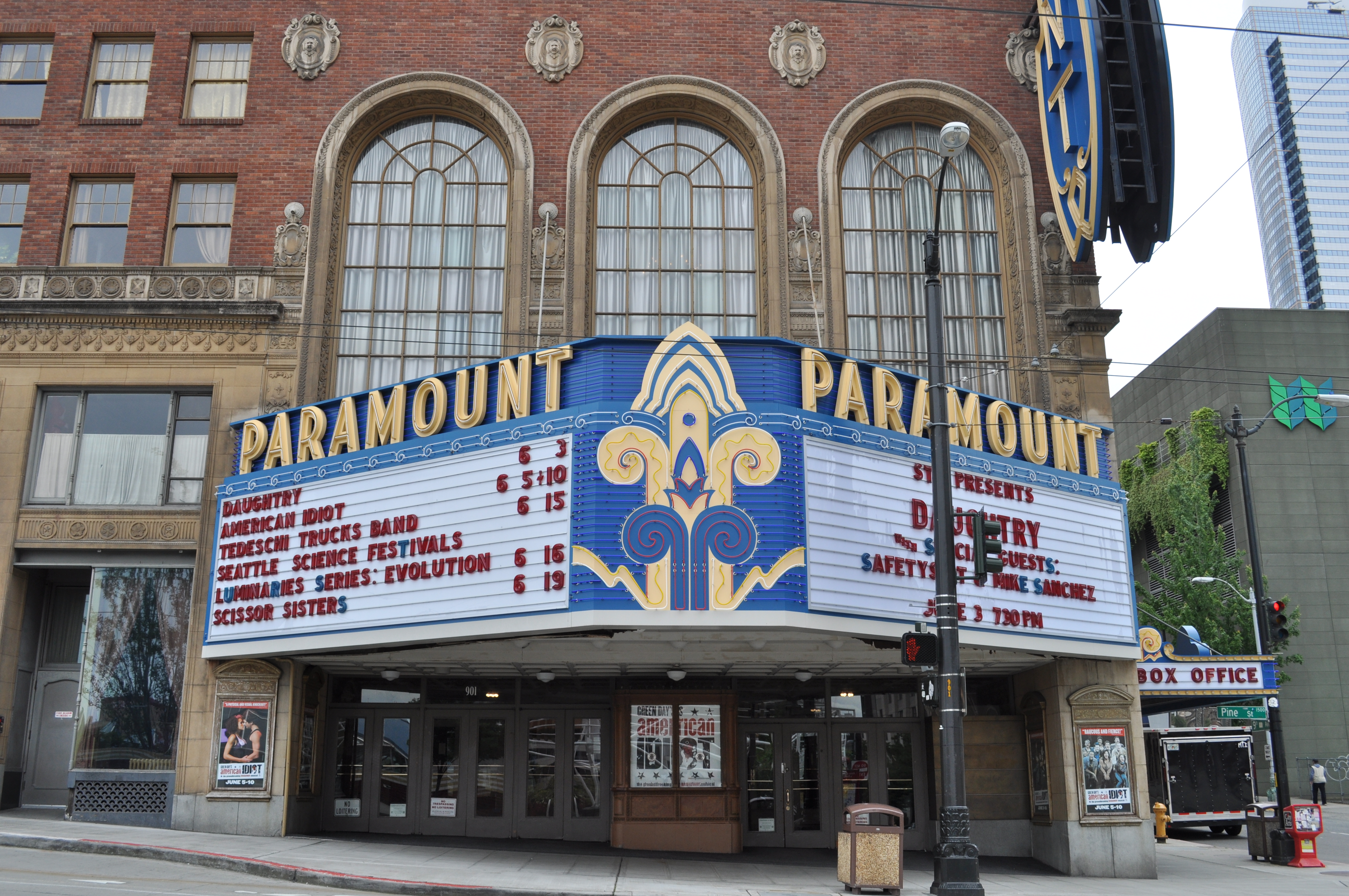
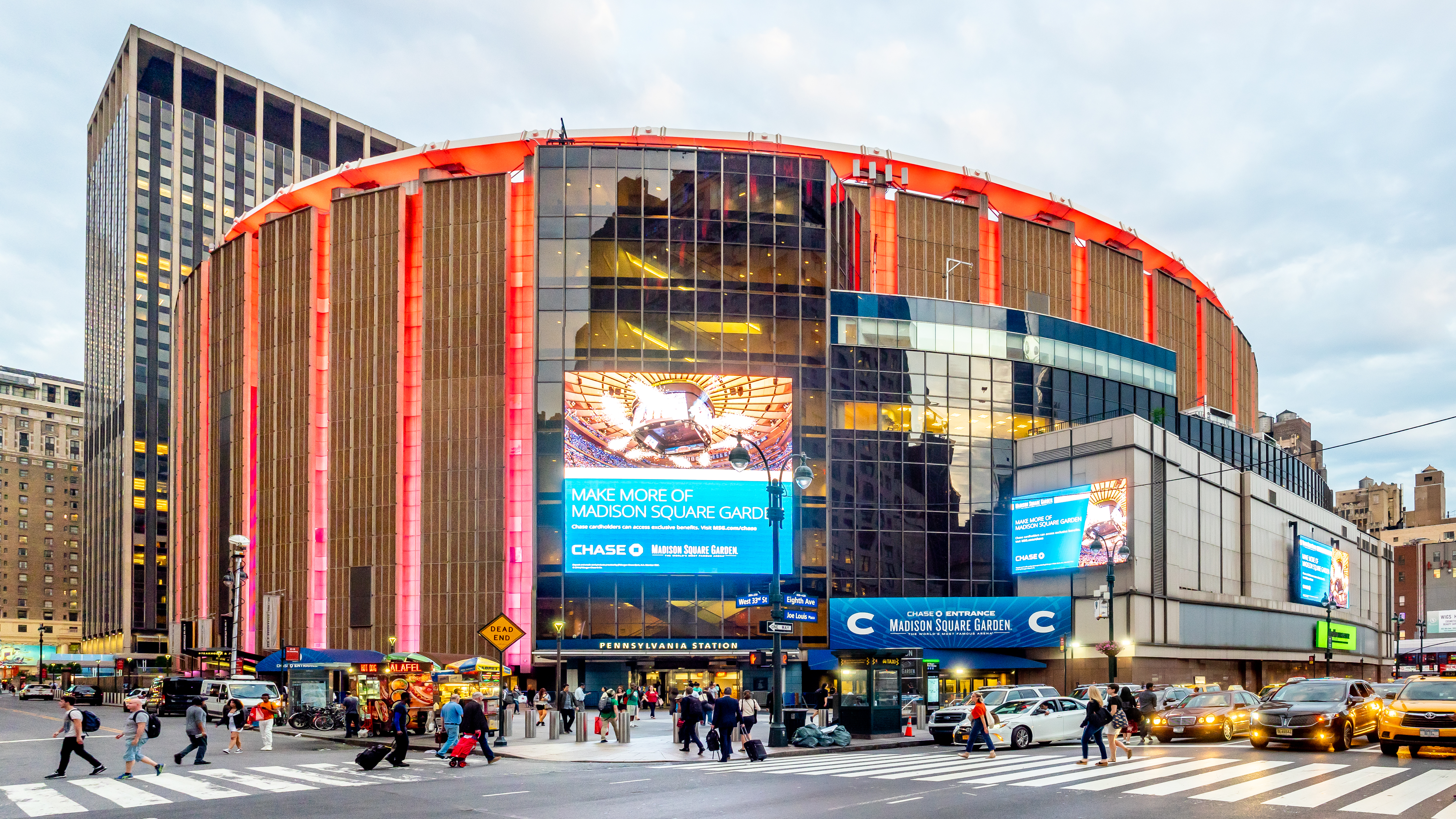
The Virgin Tour began at Seattle's Paramount Theatre (left) and ended at New York City's Madison Square Garden (right).

The Virgin Tour was officially announced on March 15, 1985, by Warner Bros. Records. Prior to the tour, Madonna's only live performances were limited to evening shows at Danceteria, CBGB and Mudd Club, and only the 1984 MTV Video Music Awards, where she performed her song "Like a Virgin". Following the success of the Like a Virgin album, the record label wanted to milk-in the success of the album by sending Madonna on a worldwide tour. However, the tour was restricted within United States and Canada. It did not visit Europe, Asia or other continents. Early on there were plans to schedule dates in Australia and Japan due to Madonna's large fan bases in both countries; however, the final schedule did not reflect the idea. In the end several more U.S. dates were added and the tour was moved to larger concert venues due to overwhelmingly strong ticket sales. Madonna was quite nervous to perform in front of a huge audience, and singing with a live band for the first time. During a 2009 interview with Rolling Stone, interviewer Austin Scaggs asked Madonna regarding her feelings and emotions during the tour, since it was the first time she was playing in arenas. Madonna replied saying

That whole tour was crazy, because I went from playing CBGB and the Mudd Club to playing sporting arenas. I played a small theater in Seattle, and the girls had flap skirts on and the tights cut off below their knees and lace gloves and rosaries and bows in their hair and big hoop earrings. I was like, "This is insane!" After Seattle, all of the shows were moved to arenas. I've never done a bus tour. Everyone says they are really fun[.]

== Development ==
After the tour was confirmed, Madonna and her troupe started working on it. Madonna wanted it to be "loud and brazen, and a reflection of my street-style and DGAF attitude". She wanted a concert where people can enjoy themselves as much as she would enjoy performing. Commenting on the development, Madonna said "I normally hate performances where there is just a singer singing, and a lame-ass band playing in the background; or shows where there is a rocker screaming his lungs out and jumping on the crowd. That just plain sucks! That's why I wanted something different, something that would be memorable". For the show, Madonna collaborated with her designer friend Maripol for the clothes and the fashion. Maripol operated a small fabric boutique called Maripolitan in Greenwich Village, where the designs and the clothes for the tour were decided by her and Madonna. Rehearsals for the show started in late February, with auditions and choosing the dancers going on in-between. Madonna specifically wanted male back-up dancers, citing that the "provocative moves that I do on stage works better with men beside me". To further promote the tour, Warner Bros. Entertainers Merchandise Management Corp. introduced the Boy Toy collection, named after the belt buckle Madonna wore on the Like a Virgin album cover picture. It consisted of a rectangular buckle, with the words "Boy" and "Toy" emblazed on it in gold color. For choosing a music director for the tour, Madonna's manager Freddy DeMann contacted record producer Patrick Leonard, who had just returned from the Victory Tour by The Jacksons. At first Leonard said no, feeling exhausted from the tour, but after he spoke to Madonna on the phone, he found her charming, and agreed to sign for the tour.

They were very bad boys—they said "fuck" all the time on the stage. The audience always booed them and they always told everyone to fuck off. I just loved them for that. I couldn't understand why everyone hated them— I thought they were so adorable.

— Madonna reminiscing her experience with Beastie Boys on the tour.

American hip hop/rap rock group Beastie Boys were signed as the opening act for the tour. In 1998, Adam "MCA" Yauch of the group recollected: "One day, Russell Simmons, co-founder of Def Jam Recordings, came in and said, 'Hey guess what—Madonna's manager called. Do you guys want to go on tour with her?'" DeMann had asked for another group called The Fat Boys, but Simmons did not manage them and lied, saying "Oh, the Fat Boys have another gig that week. What about Run–D.M.C.?" But they were too expensive according to DeMann, and hence ultimately Beastie Boys were chosen. The same year, Adam "Ad-Rock" Horovitz from the band commented: "It's not like any of us knew Madonna that much, but we all used to hang out at Danceteria [club] so we knew about each other. I don't know why she thought it would be a good idea [to open for her tour], though. It was a terrible idea. But it was great for her in a way because we were so awful that by the time she came onstage, the audience had to be happy". In 2024, Michael "Mike D" Diamond admitted in conversation with Conan O'Brien that "it was a huge deal and totally absurd that we got asked to do that tour". However, Ad-Rock noted the pairing was not as crazy as it seemed. "We used to play at the same clubs in New York", the vocalist pointed out. "No one ever talks about that part of the story".

The circular stage for the tour consisted of three ramps around the perimeter, which were connected with each other. A long line of stairs descended to the main stage from the central ramp; it was flanked by the band. About 30 ft (9.1 m) above the stage, the speakers were suspended from a circular beam. Four giant screens lined the outer perimeter of the stage, on three sides.

== Concert synopsis ==
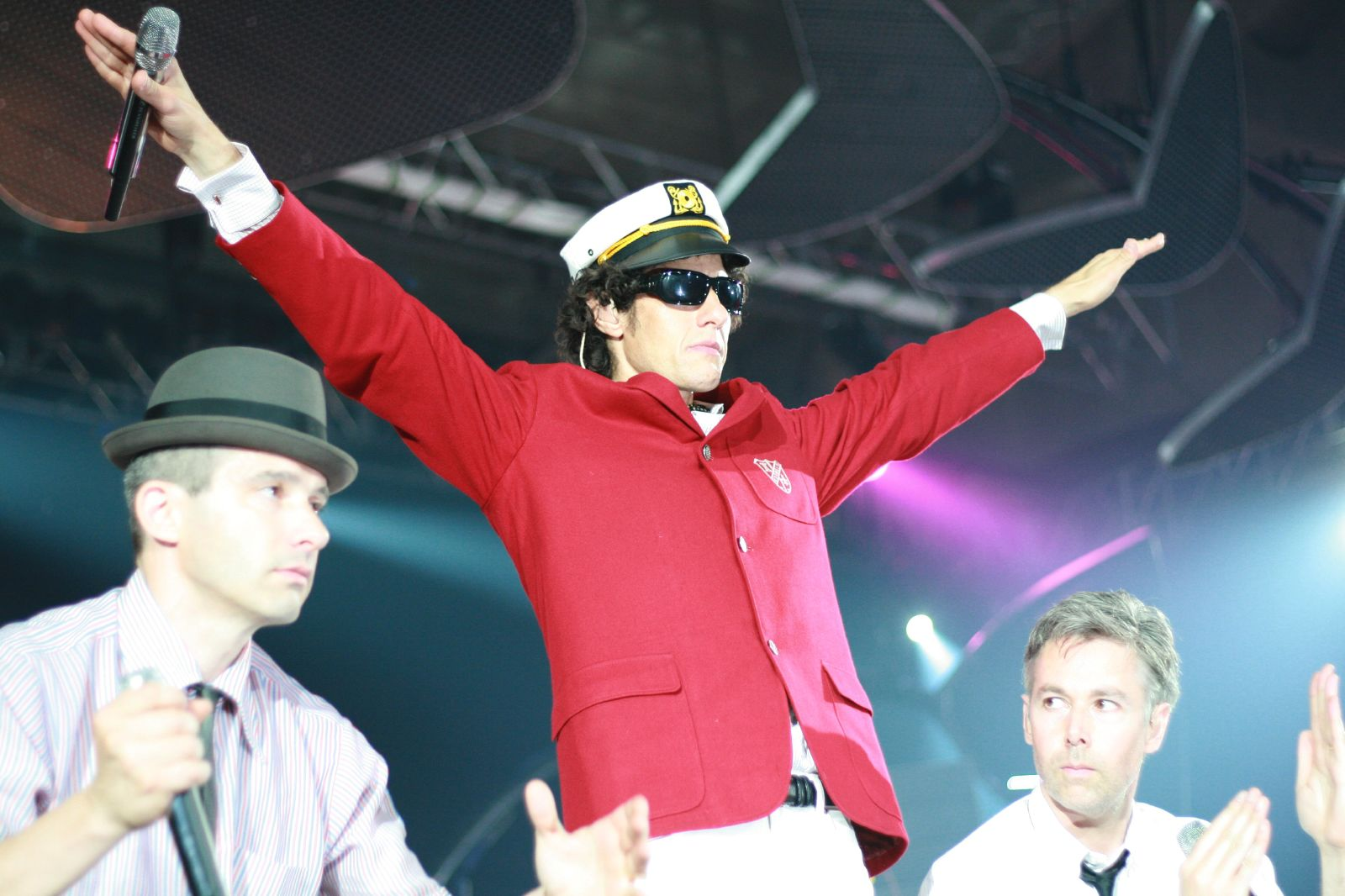
Beastie Boys (pictured in 2007) were the opening act for the tour.

The show opened with Beastie Boys performing six of their songs for 30 minutes. They were accompanied by their DJ, Rick Rubin, who scratched the music, with the Beastie Boys prancing around the stage, making lewd gestures towards the audience. As they finished their performance, the backdrops started displaying Madonna's images from her music videos. The band—consisting of guitarists, bassists, a drummer and three synthesizer players—came into focus, and the music started. Madonna's voice was heard, saying: "Don't be afraid... it's gonna be alright". Then, Madonna's silhouette appeared behind a white screen on top of the stairs as the first beats kicked in. The white screen lifted and she is finally seen, wearing a psychedelic denim jacket, a blue see-through crop-top and her characteristic green bra. She also had lacy leggings and crucifixes around her ear and her neck. She posed on the stairs before reaching the microphone to sing "Dress You Up". After dancing to the last note of the music, Madonna and the two male back-up dancers went to the back of the stage, as the music of "Holiday" began. Taking a moment to ask the audience how they are feeling, Madonna declared, "I was never elected homecoming queen, but I sure feel like one now", and started the performance of "Into the Groove", playing a tambourine. A boombox was present on the stage during the performance, Madonna sitting and playing with it, and addressing it as her "box". She continued with "Everybody", while asking the audience to clap along with her. As she finished the vigorous performance of "Everybody", the lights were dimmed and the introduction music of "Angel" started. Rotating lights fell on the stage. Madonna appeared sitting on top of the stairs and gradually descended. During the intermediate bridge, she and her dancers moved energetically around the whole stage, as white balloons fell on them from above. Madonna continued singing as the lights were dimmed again. She finished the performance and disappeared behind the wings for a costume change. She appeared on the stage wearing a black, fringed micro-top and similar skirt, with her belly-button exposed, and a number of crucifixes in different sizes, hanging from different parts of her body.

As the guitar intro of "Gambler" started, Madonna stood on the side-stage and started dancing energetically, as flashlights fell on her. While singing the song, she sometimes opened her jacket and sometimes straddled a steel structure present on the side of the stage. The performance ended with Madonna jumping off the side stage, onto the main one. She then performed "Borderline", "Lucky Star" and "Crazy for You"—while touching the hands of the audience members. Madonna then returned to the microphone and started singing "Over and Over" from Like a Virgin. It was followed by "Burning Up" during which she caressed one of the guitarist, ultimately disappearing for another costume change. As the music of the song "Like a Virgin" started, Madonna returned on the stage, wearing a wedding dress, holding a bouquet in her hand and a long white veil behind her. Accessorized by a white bow atop her head and lacy, three-quarter length gloves, she also had a crucifix on her waistband and another hanging from a long chain around her neck. Madonna asked the audience "Will you marry me?" When the audience answered affirmatively, she threw the bouquet towards them and started singing the song. Madonna continued singing the song while rolling around the floor, and added a snippet of Michael Jackson's Motown-style single, "Billie Jean". Balloons floated out towards the audience again as she pulled apart her veil and threw it towards the audience. She returned to the stage in the arms of one of the backup dancers, wearing a boob tube and a tight white skirt, carrying a bunch of notes in her left hand, and a number of garlands around her neck. In a self-parodying performance of the song "Material Girl", at the end of the performance Madonna asked the audience "Do you really think I'm a material girl? ... I'm not ... Take it [Throwing fake money] ... I don't need money ... I need love". As she began to strip off more clothes and jewelry, she was apprehended and marched offstage by an extra posing as her father. In Detroit, her father Tony Ciccone himself did the honors. The show ended with Madonna returning onstage once more to take her fur coat and doing a curtsey.

== Critical reception ==
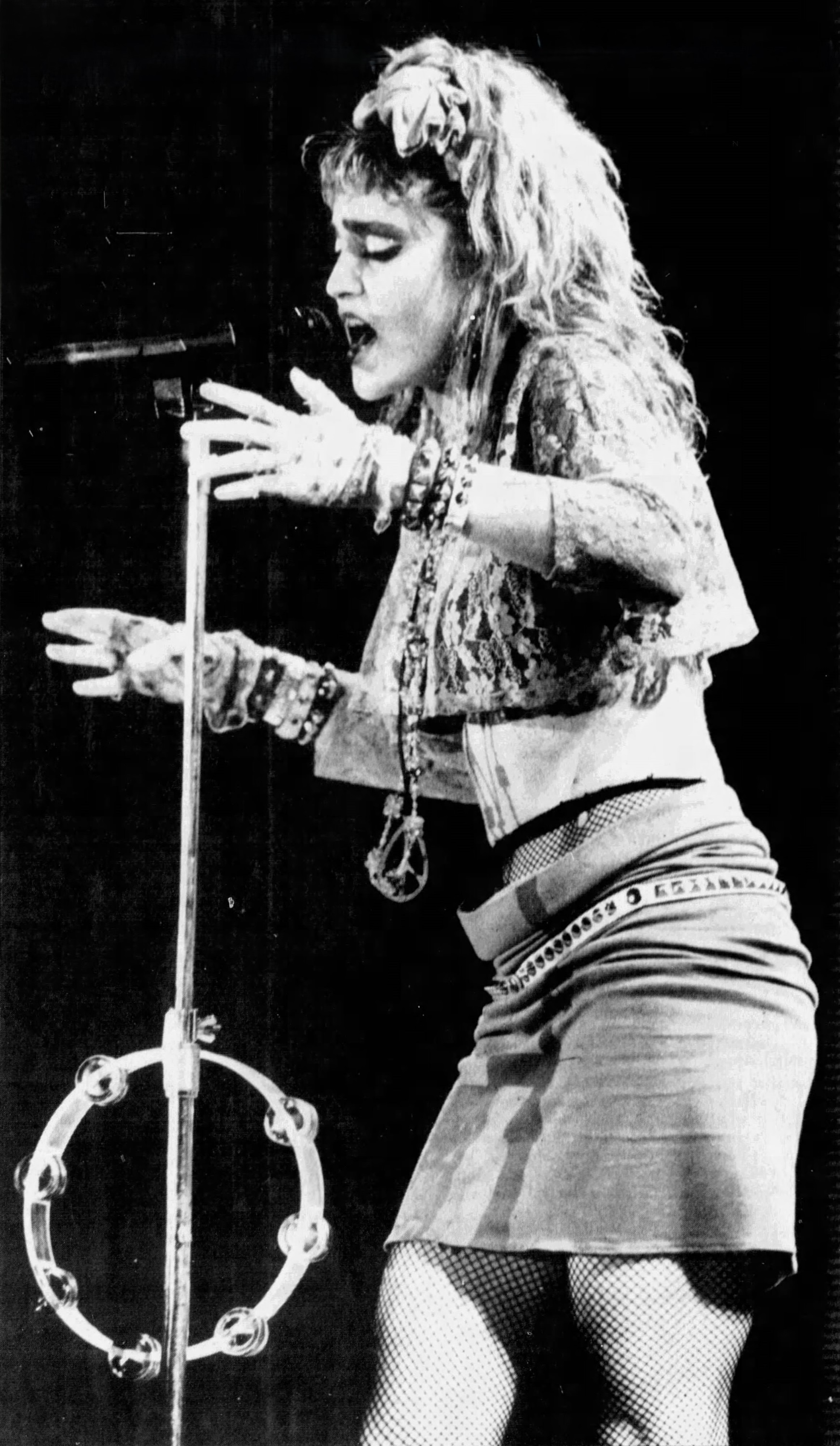
Madonna performing "Into the Groove" in one of the concerts of the tour.

The tour received generally mixed reviews from critics. Jason Stratley from The Philadelphia Inquirer said that "On stage, wiggling and writhing, a rock-video vision of messy, bleached- blond hair, bare skin, sequined paisley and dime store diamonds was the flash-and-trash rock queen Madonna. Behold the Madonna clones—she is turning into one fine legend". Jeff Sewald from the Pittsburgh Post-Gazette felt that "the modus operandi [of the tour] was clear. Madonna was not only selling her music to throngs of teen-agers and adults alike, but she was selling herself and the entire package proved to be a joy for the 14,500 screaming fans. [...] Madonna's 'Virgin Tour' had torn the cover off Pittsburgh's sexuality". Rachel Lee from The Sacramento Bee felt that "more than any pop star in recent memory, even Boy George and Prince, Madonna is an image. Her hour-long concert here Tuesday night, as professionally performed and well-choreographed as it was, did nothing to give her more dimension than the two already bestowed on her". Arthur Daniels from Lexington Herald-Leader felt that "Madonna looked grim, but the fans were delighted when the blond rock star made her first major concert appearance to kick off her 'Virgin Tour'. [...] She looked blank and did not look up as she passed fans who gathered by the stage door before the show".

Robert Hilburn from the Los Angeles Times commented: "Madonna represents a contemporary fantasy figure that revives the glamour, innocence and raw sexuality of many of Madonna's own teen heroes, including Marilyn Monroe and James Dean. Like the early Monroe, Madonna may portray a bimbo, but there she's clearly no pushover. Though the audience was on its feet throughout, it often seemed that Madonna was operating beneath her potential in this pop format. It's important to demonstrate that she can handle herself live, but the simplicity of pop concerts doesn't begin to tax her ambition or talent. In fact, she has so little to do other than express this aggressive, sexy attitude that the show seemed long at just over an hour". Heidi Sherman from Spin commented, "The Virgin Tour was Madonna's first, yet it put her in the same league as Prince and Bruce Springsteen. It proved that Madonna was beyond real. And if her stage presence indicated she was more showgirl than musician, at least she knew how to gussy up her act for the postfeminist MTV age. Boy Toy? Not exactly. She was a bonafide pop star in the process of becoming a cultural icon".

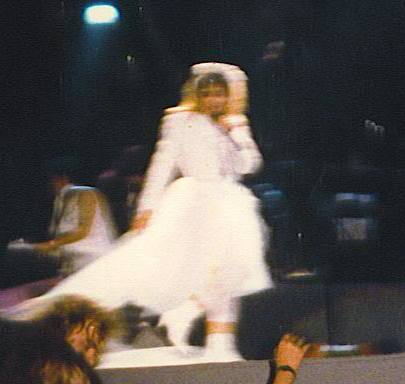
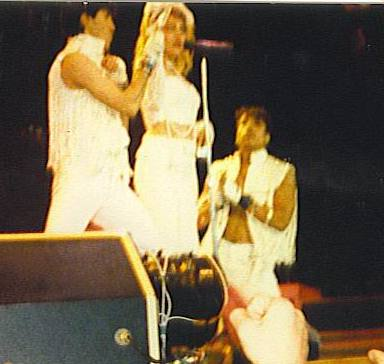
Madonna closing the concert with performances of "Like a Virgin" (top) and "Material Girl" (bottom).

Laura Fissinger from South Florida Sun-Sentinel felt that "'Virgin Tour' establishes Madonna more as a bimbo, rather than the strong, independent woman people think her to be". David O'Reilly from Philadelphia Daily News said that with the concert "Madonna proved once more why she was called a 'talentless bimbo'; it was utter trash". Richard Defendorf of Orlando Sentinel gave a positive review, saying "Madonna's 'Virgin Tour' was very enjoyable and she put her music video charms in her live performances". Maya Hathoray from The Miami Herald said that "We know [Madonna is] sexy, exotically beautiful and her funk/pop songs make us want to dance, but on stage, she is extremely tame compared to her raw persona in her music videos. She is like daddy's little girl".

Mary Edgar Smith from The Atlanta Journal-Constitution observed that "It was obvious from the apparel of the young girls at last week's Virgin Tour concerts in Tampa and Orlando, Fla., that the 26-year-old singer [Madonna] had more to give to the music world than what others suggest. She will be a force to be reckoned with". Stephen Holden from The New York Times commented, "While her pubescent lookalike fans cheer approvingly, the star's manipulation of such symbols as a wedding gown, a cross, furs and jewels becomes a lighthearted communal psychodrama. Madonna has brought traditional little girl's games of dress-up and playing with dolls (using oneself as model) into the television age by turning them into a public spectacle". A review in Variety by John Gleeson said that "Madonna's singing was like a soundtrack to a more visceral display of herself, her persona, her nonstop dancing and her surprisingly explicit sexual dare, which included a visual climax—so to speak—to every other song". Paul Grein from Billboard said that "Madonna's show was stylish, well-paced and consistently entertaining". On their rankings of Madonna's tours, VH1's Christopher Rosa and The Advocate's Gina Vivinetto both placed The Virgin Tour in the ninth position; for the former, "it's definitely energetic and full of '80s teen bombast" but lacks "the style and sophistication of her other tours", while the latter deemed it a "stripped down, sloppy romp".

== Commercial reception ==
As soon as the tour was announced, tickets were sold out almost everywhere. In San Francisco, tour shirts were selling at a clocked rate of one every six seconds. All 17,672 tickets for Madonna's show at New York City's Radio City Music Hall were completely sold out in a record-breaking 34 minutes. Both the shows at Chicago's UIC Pavilion were sold in a single day with a record-breaking 18,000 tickets being sold. In Philadelphia, a record-breaking 31,000 tickets were sold in under four hours. Along with ticket sales, merchandise associated with the tour also sold rapidly. T-shirts, posters and promo-magazines featuring Madonna's image were picked up by the fans, even though most them were overpriced compared to the market value. After its end, the Virgin Tour was reported to have grossed over $5 million ($14.97 million in 2025 dollars), with Billboard Boxscore reporting a gross of $3.3 million ($9.88 million in 2025 dollars).

== Recordings ==
An official video recording of the concert in Detroit was released as Madonna Live: The Virgin Tour, in VHS and LaserDisc, in November 1985. "Angel", "Borderline" and "Burning Up" were part of the tour set list but were not included on the release. It was certified gold by the Recording Industry Association of America (RIAA) for shipment of 50,000 copies and received a "Video Software Dealers Award" for the Most Popular Music Video in September 1986. The video received mixed reviews from critics. Annie Temple from Philadelphia Daily News said that the release was "not so flattering" and "was a sloppy job". Dennis Hunt from the Los Angeles Times said that "the video is sometimes distracting and blurry, wonder what went wrong during recording. The angles are awkward, especially when the audience members are shown touching Madonna's hand. Was it really necessary to show a fan coming unannounced on the stage?" Terry Atkinson from the same paper said, "This follows the typical concert video format of putting you in the best seat in the hall and letting the aura of a superior performer encaptivate your senses". Joe Logan and Gail Shister from The Wichita Eagle said that "seeing Madonna live in an arena and seeing her up, close and personal in the tour cassette is totally different. The energy, the movements, the provocation—all captures you more".

The release debuted at 14 on Billboard's Top Music Videocassettes chart, on December 7, 1985, and reached a peak of 11, the next week. The video started a slow climb on the chart, and on the issue dated January 18, 1986, it reached the top of the chart, replacing Prince & The Revolution: Live by The Revolution. On May 24, 1986, the video again climbed back in the top ten of the chart, at position two. It was present on the chart for a total of 65 weeks. Live – The Virgin Tour was the top selling music videocassette for 1986. The video was certified two-times platinum by the Recording Industry Association of America (RIAA) for shipment of 200,000 copies and received a "Video Software Dealers Award" for the Most Popular Music Video, in September 1986.

== Legacy ==
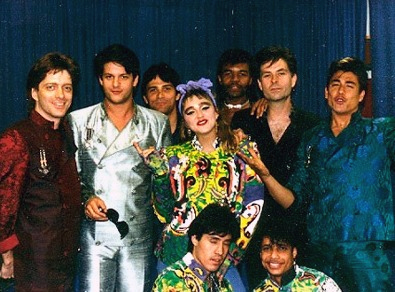
Madonna, at the center, seen with her band members from the tour. Her clothing style inspired women who emulated it.

When the tour first started, people—especially women—thronged to see it wearing clothes inspired by Madonna. Debbi Voller, author of Madonna: The Style Book, observed that "Hundreds of thousands of young girls came to the concert dressed like her, with bleached and tousled hair, see-through tops, bras, fingerless gloves and crucifixes. Magazines and TV shows ran lookalike competitions". This frenzy regarding Madonna gave rise to a new term called Madonna wannabe—a word that was ultimately officially recognized by the Webster's Dictionary in May 1991. Madonna was mystified as to why all the women would want to copy her look. She commented,

"I never set out to be a role model. I am a strong woman, a successful woman, and I don't conform to a stereotype. For so long women have been told that there are certain ways they mustn't look if they want to get ahead in life. And there I was dressing in a forbidden way and yet obviously in charge of my life. It was then I realized why all of them were out there in their seats, dressing like me".

While the tour was going on, the American lingerie industry reported that their turnover was suddenly up by 40 percent and that Madonna's image was responsible for this underwear revival. Sam Gower from Rolling Stone commented, "In the sixties, women burned their bras, now they wear five at a time, and bare their belly buttons. Madonna has done for the corset and crucifix what punk did for the safety pin. Macy's New York department store was flooded with buyers, who bought the tour merchandise like the crucifix earrings and fingerless gloves". The demand was so huge that Macy's had to refill the merchandise time again. Madonna's subversive antics on the tour provoked fiery and antics among the press. Rolling Stone said: "Like Marilyn Monroe, Madonna is bent on epitomizing and championing a vision of female sexuality, and like Monroe she is often dismissed as an artist for doing so". In their 1994 essay On Fashion, authors Shari Benstock and Suzanne Ferriss noted that "on one level, Madonna is a toy for boys, but on another level boys are toys for her, the Boy Toys are there for her toying around and the unchastity belt comes off at her whim and desire. Indeed, 'Material Girl' shows the guys as Madonna's toys and her dance numbers with men during the Virgin Tour concerts shows them as her underlinings, accessories that she toys with and totally dominates".

In 2024, in conversation with Conan O'Brien, surviving Beastie Boys member Michael "Mike D" Diamond commented that "[Madonna] booked the tour and she was playing like theaters. And by the time the tour was actually happening, she was so beyond selling out a theater in terms of stature. Before the tour was finished, I think she was like on the cover of Time magazine or something. She was on her way to being a cultural phenomenon [when the tour started], but then she really was one by the end of that tour". The singer wouldn't tour in theaters and small venues during her career until her Madame X Tour in 2019–2020.

== Set list ==
Set list and samples per Madonna's official website and the notes and track listing of Madonna Live: The Virgin Tour.

1. "Dress You Up"
2. "Holiday"
3. "Into the Groove"
4. "Everybody"
5. "Angel"
6. "Gambler"
7. "Borderline"
8. "Lucky Star"
9. "Crazy for You"
10. "Over and Over"
11. "Burning Up"
12. "Like a Virgin" (Contains an excerpt from "Billie Jean")
13. "Material Girl"

== Tour dates ==
List of 1985 concerts
Date (1985)	City	Country	Venue	Opening act	Attendance	Revenue
April 10	Seattle	United States	Paramount Theatre	Beastie Boys	8,934 / 8,934	—N/a
April 12	Seattle	United States	Paramount Theatre	Beastie Boys	8,934 / 8,934	—N/a
April 13	Seattle	United States	Paramount Theatre	Beastie Boys	8,934 / 8,934	—N/a
April 15	Portland	United States	Arlene Schnitzer Concert Hall	Beastie Boys	—N/a	—N/a
April 16	Portland	United States	Arlene Schnitzer Concert Hall	Beastie Boys	—N/a	—N/a
April 19	San Diego	United States	SDSU Open Air Theatre	Beastie Boys	8,696 / 8,696	$124,773
April 20	San Diego	United States	SDSU Open Air Theatre	Beastie Boys	8,696 / 8,696	$124,773
April 21	Costa Mesa	United States	Pacific Amphitheatre	Beastie Boys	18,765 / 18,765	$297,473
April 23	San Francisco	United States	San Francisco Civic Auditorium	Beastie Boys	8,500 / 8,500	$127,500
April 26	Los Angeles	United States	Universal Amphitheatre	Beastie Boys	—N/a	—N/a
April 27	Los Angeles	United States	Universal Amphitheatre	Beastie Boys	—N/a	—N/a
April 28	Los Angeles	United States	Universal Amphitheatre	Beastie Boys	—N/a	—N/a
April 30	Tempe	United States	ASU Activity Center	Beastie Boys	10,013 / 10,013	$133,427
May 3	Dallas	United States	Dallas Convention Center	Beastie Boys	8,717 / 8,717	$130,735
May 4	Houston	United States	Hofheinz Pavilion	Beastie Boys	7,300 / 7,300	$101,880
May 5	Austin	United States	Frank Erwin Center	Beastie Boys	14,639 / 14,639	$208,005
May 7	New Orleans	United States	UNO Lakefront Arena	Beastie Boys	—N/a	—N/a
May 9	Tampa	United States	USF Sun Dome	Beastie Boys	8,400 / 8,400	$125,415
May 10	Orlando	United States	Orange County Convention Center	Beastie Boys	10,596 / 10,596	$154,275
May 11	Pembroke Pines	United States	Hollywood Sportatorium	Beastie Boys	—N/a	—N/a
May 14	Atlanta	United States	Omni Coliseum	Beastie Boys	14,843 / 14,843	$215,760
May 16	Cleveland	United States	Public Auditorium	Beastie Boys	—N/a	—N/a
May 17	Cincinnati	United States	Cincinnati Gardens	Beastie Boys	9,941 / 9,941	—N/a
May 18	Chicago	United States	UIC Pavilion	Beastie Boys	18,000 / 18,000	—N/a
May 20	Chicago	United States	UIC Pavilion	Beastie Boys	18,000 / 18,000	—N/a
May 21	Saint Paul	United States	St. Paul Civic Center	Beastie Boys	16,799 / 16,799	—N/a
May 23	Toronto	Canada	Maple Leaf Gardens	Beastie Boys	16,000 / 16,000	$238,264
May 25	Detroit	United States	Cobo Hall	Beastie Boys	24,382 / 24,382	$332,780
May 26	Detroit	United States	Cobo Hall	Beastie Boys	24,382 / 24,382	$332,780
May 28	Pittsburgh	United States	Civic Arena	Beastie Boys	15,600 / 15,600	$219,210
May 29	Philadelphia	United States	The Spectrum	Beastie Boys	15,543 / 15,543	$207,547
May 30	Hampton	United States	Hampton Coliseum	Beastie Boys	—N/a	—N/a
June 1	Columbia	United States	Merriweather Post Pavilion	Beastie Boys	—N/a	—N/a
June 2	Worcester	United States	Centrum in Worcester	Beastie Boys	11,981 / 11,981	$177,515
June 3	New Haven	United States	New Haven Coliseum	Beastie Boys	10,190 / 10,190	$153,856
June 6	New York City	United States	Radio City Music Hall	Beastie Boys	17,538 / 17,538	$294,050
June 7	New York City	United States	Radio City Music Hall	Beastie Boys	17,538 / 17,538	$294,050
June 8	New York City	United States	Radio City Music Hall	Beastie Boys	17,538 / 17,538	$294,050
June 10	New York City	United States	Madison Square Garden	Beastie Boys	—N/a	—N/a
June 11	New York City	United States	Madison Square Garden	Beastie Boys	—N/a	—N/a
Total					239,703 / 239,703 (100%)	$3,272,084

== Personnel ==
Adapted from The Virgin Tour program.

- Madonna – creator, vocals, tambourine
- Patrick Leonard – keyboards
- Bill Meyers – keyboards
- Jonathan P. Moffet – drums
- Bill Lanphier – bass guitar, synth bass
- James Harrah – guitars
- Paul Pesco – guitars
- Michael Perea - dancer
- Lyndon B. Johnson - dancer
- Brad Jeffries – choreographer, staging
- Maripol - costume designer
- Ian Knight – set designer
- Freddy DeMann – personal management
- Dave Kob – audio mixer
- Rick Coberly - monitor mixer

== Bibliography ==
- Benstock, Shari; Ferriss, Suzanne (1994), On Fashion, Pages 183–195, Rutgers University Press, ISBN 0-8135-2033-9
- Bronson, Fred (2003), The Billboard Book of Number 1 Hits, Billboard books, ISBN 0-8230-7677-6
- Clerk, Carol (2002), Madonnastyle, Omnibus Press, ISBN 0-7119-8874-9
- Kellner, Douglas (1995), Media Culture: Cultural Studies, Identity, and Politics Between the Modern and the Postmodern, Routledge, ISBN 0-415-10570-6
- Metz, Allen; Benson, Carol (1999), The Madonna Companion: Two Decades of Commentary, Music Sales Group, ISBN 0-8256-7194-9
- Morton, Andrew (2002), Madonna, Macmillan Publishers, ISBN 0-312-98310-7
- Taraborrelli, Randy J. (2002), Madonna: An Intimate Biography, Simon & Schuster, ISBN 0-7432-2709-3
- Voller, Debbi (1999), Madonna: The Style Book, Omnibus Press, ISBN 0-7119-7511-6
