= Dress You Up =

1985 single by Madonna

- Artwork used for most seven-inch releases

Single by Madonna

from the album Like a Virgin
- B-side: "Shoo-Bee-Doo"
- Released: July 31, 1985
- Recorded: 1984
- Studio: Power Station (New York City)
- Genre: Dance-pop
- Length: 4:01
- Label: Sire; Warner Bros.
- Songwriters: Andrea LaRusso; Peggy Stanziale
- Producer: Nile Rodgers

Madonna singles chronology
"Into the Groove" (1985)	"Dress You Up" (1985)	"Gambler" (1985)

Music video
- "Dress You Up" on YouTube

"Dress You Up" is a song by American singer Madonna from her second studio album, Like a Virgin (1984). Written by Andrea LaRusso and Peggy Stanziale and produced by Nile Rodgers, it was released by Sire Records on July 31, 1985, as the album's fourth and final single. A dance-pop track with elements of electropop, the song combines disco-influenced rhythms, synthesizers, and guitars with lyrics that use fashion as a metaphor for romantic desire.

Upon release, "Dress You Up" received generally favorable reviews, with critics commenting on its production, melody, and suggestive lyrics. It also attracted controversy when the Parents Music Resource Center (PMRC) included it on its "Filthy Fifteen" list of songs deemed offensive and sexually explicit. Commercially, the single performed well, becoming Madonna's sixth consecutive top-five single on the Billboard Hot 100. Internationally, it reached the top ten in Australia, Belgium, Canada, Ireland, New Zealand, and the United Kingdom.

Madonna has performed "Dress You Up" on four of her concert tours, the last being the Rebel Heart Tour (2015–2016). A live performance from the Virgin Tour (1985) served as its promotional music video and received a nomination for Best Choreography at the 1986 MTV Video Music Awards. The song has also been covered by artists including Apollo Heights, Reel Big Fish, Zolof the Rock & Roll Destroyer, and Darren Criss, and was featured in a 1999 Gap commercial and a 2013 episode of the television series Glee.

== Background and release ==
Nile Rodgers (pictured in 2023) produced and played guitars on "Dress You Up".

Madonna released her self-titled debut album on July 27, 1983, which achieved commercial success and spawned the hit singles "Holiday" and "Borderline". Despite its success, she was dissatisfied with her limited creative input, particularly regarding her work with producer Reggie Lucas, and sought greater control over her next project. By early 1984, Madonna had begun working on her second album, Like a Virgin, writing songs with longtime collaborator Stephen Bray. After Warner Bros. Records rejected her request to produce the album herself, the singer selected Nile Rodgers, whose work with Chic and on David Bowie's Let's Dance (1983) she admired. Recording sessions took place in mid-1984 at New York's Power Station studios.

"Dress You Up" was the final song recorded for Like a Virgin, having been submitted late in the recording process by Peggy Stanziale, daughter of US congressman Peter W. Rodino, and her longtime collaborator Andrea LaRusso. Although Sire Records initially discouraged its submission, the song caught Madonna's attention, prompting her to personally contact the songwriters and insist on recording it despite Rodgers' concerns over time constraints. Personnel working on the song included Rodgers on guitar, Jimmy Bralower on drum programming, and Robert Sabino on synthesizers and synth bass. Curtis King, Frank Simms, and George Simms provided backing vocals.

Issued as the fourth and final single from Like a Virgin, "Dress You Up" was released on July 31, 1985. The song was later included on the two-disc edition of Madonna's third compilation album, Celebration (2009). In August 2025, to mark the single's 40th anniversary, a digital extended play (EP) was released featuring several remixes. This release was dedicated to Barbie doll designers Mario Paglino and Gianni Grossi, longtime Madonna fans and collaborators, following their deaths earlier that year.

== Composition ==
"Dress You Up"
20-second excerpt of "Dress You Up", highlighting its dance-pop sound and electro elements, with Madonna singing the refrain "Gonna dress you up in my love".

Musically, "Dress You Up" has been described as a dance-pop song with electropop elements. Built around a drum machine–driven beat, it contrasts a simple, fluid verse with a fuller, faster-paced refrain. Author Robert Matthew-Walker described its vocal structure as consisting of two parts: a softer, more intimate opening, followed by a faster, higher-pitched hook sung in double time. The production combines a steady disco rhythm, an "infectious" synthesizer line, Rodgers' sharp, repeating guitar riff, and backing vocals punctuated by exclamations such as "Owww". As the song progresses, the refrain introduces the central hook, "Gonna dress you up in my love", before a rock guitar solo and brief breakdown lead back into the main rhythm.

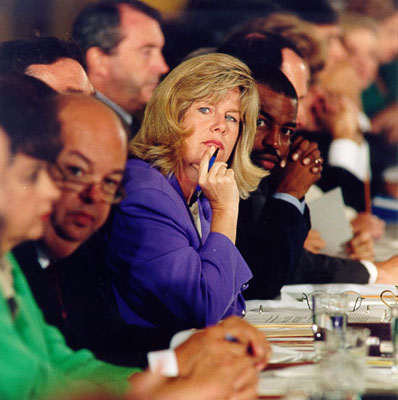
Mary Elizabeth "Tipper" Gore (pictured in 1985), co-founder of the Parents Music Resource Center (PMRC), which included "Dress You Up" on its "Filthy 15" list.

Lyrically, the song blends fashion and intimacy, using clothing as a metaphor for romantic and sexual attraction. Matthew-Walker characterized it as a song of female admiration for a male lover, comparing the opening vocals to a woman gently running her hands over a man's naked body. This sensuality is reflected in lyrics such as "let me cover you with velvet kisses" and "gonna dress you up in my love". Billboard's Kenneth Partridge observed that Rodgers' guitar work, particularly its rhythmic interplay and melodic solo, adds a contrasting edge to the song's sensual lyrics, drawing comparisons to the sound of Purple Rain (1984). The arrangement gradually builds through layers of bass, keyboards, guitar, and male backing vocals, creating a fuller, groove-driven sound.

The nearly six-minute "12" Formal Mix" extends the song's midsection with a prominent bassline and rhythmic bell accents while retaining Rodgers' guitar work. The "Casual Instrumental Mix", running approximately four and a half minutes, omits Madonna's vocals to highlight the underlying melody and groove.

=== Controversy ===
In the summer of 1985, the Parents Music Resource Center (PMRC) included "Dress You Up" on its "Filthy Fifteen" list, which compiled songs by multiple artists considered to be the "most offensive" of the time. Committee co-founder Mary Elizabeth "Tipper" Gore reportedly became concerned after hearing her daughter listen to the song, citing the refrain "Gonna dress you up in my love" as an example of "vulgar music". Gore also described popular culture as "morally bankrupt, flagrantly licentious, and utterly materialistic", singling out Madonna as "the worst of all". The PMRC proposed a content-rating system with four categories: "X" for sexually explicit or profane lyrics, "O" for occult references, "D/A" for drug and alcohol use, and "V" for violence. "Dress You Up" was assigned an "X" designation for its sexually suggestive lyrics. The PMRC's campaign contributed to a broader debate over music censorship that eventually led the Recording Industry Association of America (RIAA) to adopt the Parental Advisory labeling system.

== Critical reception ==
Upon release, "Dress You Up" received generally positive reviews from music critics. Billboard''s Nancy Erlich described Madonna's vocals as "pert" and "saucy", while Cash Box highlighted the song's "bubbling groove" and "irresistible" refrain, a sentiment echoed by Slant Magazine's Sal Cinquemani. AllMusic's Stephen Thomas Erlewine considered it, alongside "Angel", an example of "excellent standard-issue" pop, while author Daryl Easlea described it as "bright and campy". William McKeen noted its "insistently chugging" melody, and The Detroit News' Adam Graham called it a "seductive dance track" that, despite being somewhat underdeveloped, showcased Madonna's "knack for memorable hooks".

Sebastián E. Alonso of Spanish website Jenesaispop praised its lyrics as among the "coolest" ever written, while Justin Myers of the Official Charts Company described them as "smart [and] sexy and very Madonna". Billboard critic Chuck Arnold similarly noted that, despite not being written by the singer, "['Dress You Up'] sounds so much like her". Authors Santiago Fouz-Hernández and Freya Jarman-Ivens likened Madonna's delivery to that of a "sex kitten", while The Guardian's Caroline Sullivan suggested that the track "contrives to make [her] [...] sound, for the first and only time, like a virgin". USA Today's Melissa Ruggieri noted its "girlish charm", while Ed Masley of The Arizona Republic highlighted the sexual innuendo beneath its coy lyrics. More critical reviews came from the Stamford Advocate's David Baude, who called the song a "fine dance tune" but felt it sounded "too much like a rewrite" of "Holiday", and Mandalit Del Barco from The Spokesman-Review, who found it "groovy" but repetitive.

PinkNews' Mayer Nissim and Rolling Stone praised the song's production, with the latter describing it as one of Rodgers' "funkiest" contributions to Like a Virgin. Both Erlewine and Stylus Magazine's Alfred Soto lamented its omission from The Immaculate Collection (1990). In a 2003 reader poll conducted by Q magazine, the song ranked eighth among Madonna's greatest singles. Arnold placed it third among the songs on Like a Virgin, describing it as a "throbbing come-on impossible to resist", while Myers and Nissim identified it among her underrated songs. Revisiting the "Filthy Fifteen" controversy, Rolling Stone's Kory Grow described the song as "largely innocuous by Madonna standards", a sentiment echoed by HuffPost's Matthew Jacobs, who called it "quite mild and quite fun", and The Guardian's Jude Rogers, who found its suggestive references "gently diverting". Scott Kearnan of Boston.com similarly considered the controversy disproportionate, arguing that the song's inclusion reflected "how rebellious even Madonna's less-tawdry tracks once sounded". Critics have cited "Dress You Up" as one of Madonna's best songs. (Note: Attributed to multiple sources, including The A.V. Club, The Arizona Republic, TheBacklot.com, Billboard, Boston.com, Classic Pop, The Detroit News, Entertainment Weekly, Jenesaispop, Parade, PinkNews, Rolling Stone, and USA Today.)

== Chart performance ==
On August 10, 1985, Billboard reported that "Dress You Up" was among the most added songs to radio playlists, causing it to debut at number 36 on the Hot 100. By September 21, it had become Madonna's seventh consecutive top-ten hit, a streak surpassed at the time by only four female artists: Brenda Lee, Aretha Franklin, Connie Francis, and Donna Summer. It was also the fourth single from Like a Virgin to reach the top ten, making the album the second by a female artist to produce four such hits, the other being Cyndi Lauper's She's So Unusual (1983). "Dress You Up" eventually peaked at number five, becoming Madonna's sixth consecutive top-five hit. The single also spent four weeks atop Billboard's Dance Singles Sales chart and reached number 22 on the Adult Contemporary chart. It ranked at numbers 98 and 13 on the year-end Hot 100 and Dance charts, respectively. On August 2024, Billboard ranked "Dress You Up" as Madonna's 32nd most successful Hot 100 entry.

In Canada, the song debuted at number 90 on the RPM Top 100 and climbed to number 10 on October 12, 1985, after eight weeks on the chart. In the UK Singles Chart, "Dress You Up" debuted at number 12 on December 12, 1985, and rose to number five the following week. It remained on the chart for 11 weeks and was certified silver by the British Phonographic Industry (BPI) for shipments of 200,000 copies. According to Music Week magazine, the single had sold more than 204,970 copies in the country by 2008. In Australia, it reached number five in October 1985, becoming Madonna's sixth top-ten single there. In New Zealand, the song debuted at number 28 on September 15 and peaked at number seven. Elsewhere in Europe, "Dress You Up" reached the top ten in Belgium, Ireland, and the Netherlands,, but peaked outside the top 30 in West Germany, France, and Switzerland. On the European Hot 100 Singles, the song peaked at number six.

== Live performances ==
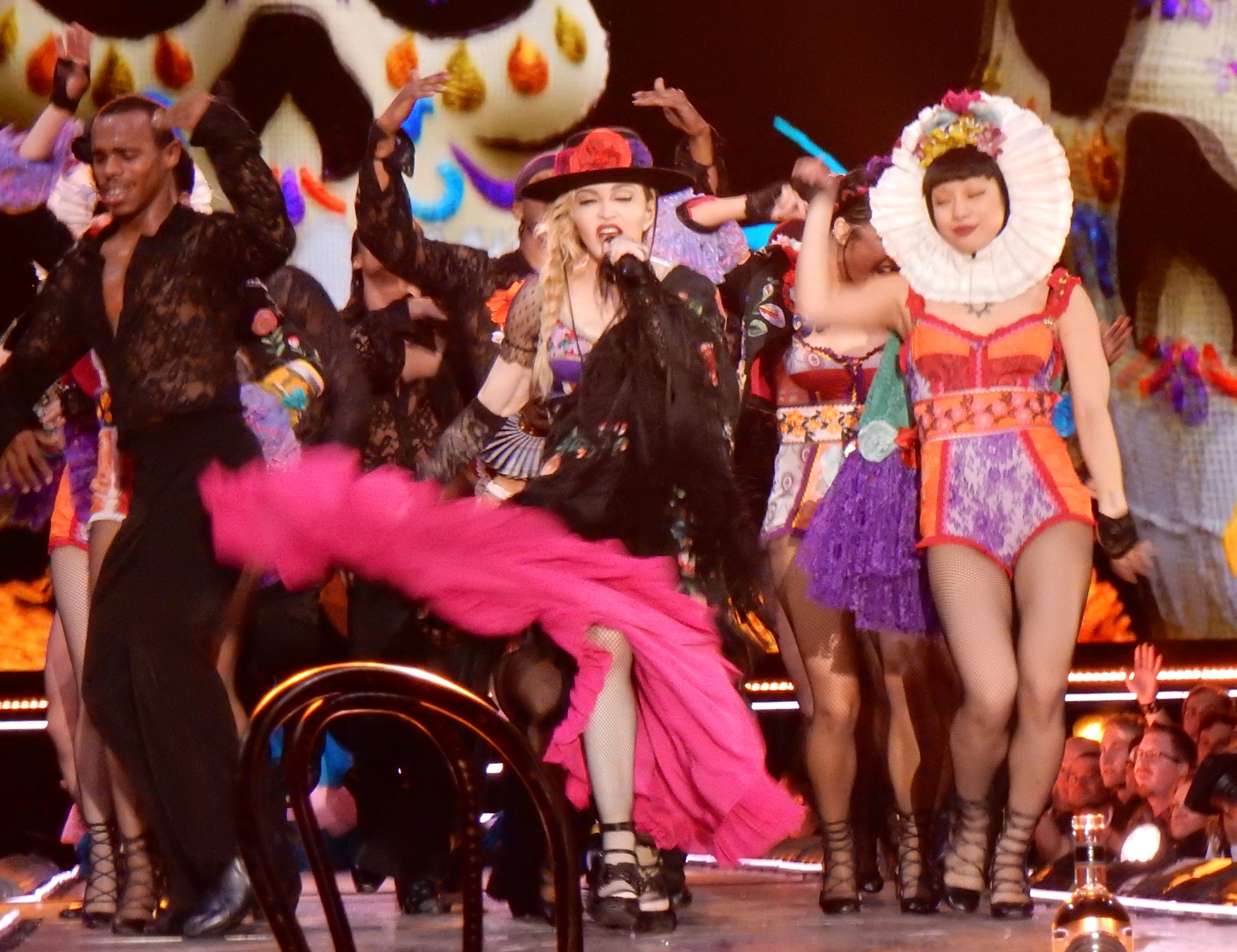
Madonna singing "Dress You Up" on the Rebel Heart Tour (2015–2016), where it was incorporated into a Latin-themed medley with "Lucky Star" and "Into the Groove".

Madonna first performed "Dress You Up" on May 16, 1984, at artist Keith Haring's birthday party at New York City's Paradise Garage, wearing a leather jacket personally painted by Haring. The song was later included on four of her concert tours: Virgin (1985), Who's That Girl (1987), Sticky & Sweet (2009), and Rebel Heart (2015―2016). On the first, it served as opening number, with Madonna descending a staircase in a "trashy chic" outfit consisting of lace tights, a tube top, a colorful miniskirt, and a short jacket. The performance was preceded by a slideshow of photographs of the singer. The number from the concert at Detroit's Cobo Arena was released as a music video to promote the tour's video release and added to MTV's rotation during the week of August 3, 1985. It received a Best Choreography nomination at the 1986 MTV Video Music Awards.

For the Who's That Girl World Tour, the song was performed as part of a medley with "Like a Virgin" and "Material Girl". Madonna sang in a cracked voice that may have parodied jazz singer Mildred Bailey, changed clothes inside an onstage telephone booth, and emerged wearing what author Michelle Morgan described as one of the show's most elaborate costumes: a dress covered in toys, trinkets, and other plastic paraphernalia. At one point, she bent over to reveal a pair of lace panties emblazoned with the word "Kiss", before removing them and throwing them into the crowd. A performance from this tour was included on the video release Ciao Italia: Live from Italy (1988).

On the Confessions Tour (2006), "Dress You Up" was sampled in "The Duke Mixes the Hits", a medley featuring elements of "Holiday", "Borderline", and "Erotica" (1992). During the 2008 leg of the Sticky & Sweet Tour, Madonna performed brief a cappella renditions of the song at the audience's request at the Philadelphia and Los Angeles concerts. "Dress You Up" was subsequently added to the tour's 2009 extension, reworked into a "metal guitar-fest" that incorporated samples of "My Sharona" (1979) by The Knack and "God Save the Queen" (1977) by Sex Pistols. The performance was singled out for praise by The Guardian's Alex Macpherson.

On March 20, 2015, Madonna performed "Dress You Up" with host Ellen DeGeneres on The Ellen DeGeneres Show while promoting her thirteenth studio album, Rebel Heart. Dressed in matching white bathrobes, DeGeneres interjected playful responses to the lyrics while Madonna sang. On the Rebel Heart Tour, it was included in a slow, Latin-inspired medley with "Into the Groove" (1985) and "Lucky Star" (1983), accompanied by Day of the Dead–themed visuals. Madonna performed wearing a black dress, hat, and shawl. Billboard's Joe Lynch praised the Spanish guitar arrangement, though he felt the maracas were "a little much". The number was included on the tour's 2017 video release.

== Covers ==
Darren Criss (pictured in 2011) covered "Dress You Up" in 2012.

In 1999, "Dress You Up" was used in a television commercial for Gap as part of its fall advertising campaign. The advertisement featured Alex Greenwald, Rashida Jones, Monet Mazur, and Jason Thompson performing the song, with music remixed by the Dust Brothers. In 2007, American band Apollo Heights covered "Dress You Up" for the tribute album Through the Wilderness. That same year, Reel Big Fish and Zolof the Rock & Roll Destroyer recorded a collaborative version for Duet All Night Long, which AllMusic's Corey Apar described as an "effervescent" blend of ska and synth-pop.

In 2012, Darren Criss covered "Dress You Up" for a promotional video for Fashion's Night Out. Criss expressed enthusiasm for the opportunity, adding, "I hope Madonna thinks it's cool if she ever hears it". The following year, a mashup of "Dress You Up" and Elton John's "The Bitch Is Back" (1974), performed by Blake Jenner and Alex Newell, was featured in "Feud", an episode of the fourth season of American musical television series Glee; Entertainment Weekly's Erin Strecker called it an "enjoyable mash up" and praised the pairing of the two performers.

== Track listing and formats ==
- Seven-inch single
1. "Dress You Up" – 3:58
2. "Shoo-Bee-Doo" – 5:14
- Special edition British seven-inch picture disc
1. "Dress You Up" – 3:58
2. "I Know It" – 4:36
- Twelve-inch and CD single
1. "Dress You Up" (The 12" formal mix) – 6:15
2. "Dress You Up" (The casual instrumental mix) – 4:36
3. "Shoo-Bee-Doo" – 5:14
- British twelve-inch single
1. "Dress You Up" (The formal mix) – 6:15
2. "Dress You Up" (The casual instrumental mix) – 4:36
3. "I Know It" – 4:36
- Special edition Japanese twelve-inch maxi-single
1. A1 "Dress You Up" (The 12" formal mix) – 6:15
2. A2 "Shoo-Bee-Doo" – 5:14
3. B1 "Ain't No Big Deal" – 4:17
4. B2 "Dress You Up" (The casual instrumental mix) – 4:36
- 2025 digital single
1. "Dress You Up" (remix/edit) – 3:48
2. "Dress You Up" (The 12" formal mix) – 6:16
3. "Dress You Up" (The casual instrumental mix) – 4:37

== Credits and personnel ==
Credits adapted from the Like a Virgin album liner notes.

- Madonna – vocals
- Nile Rodgers – producer, guitars
- Andrea LaRusso – songwriter
- Peggy Stanziale – songwriter
- Jimmy Bralower – LinnDrum and Simmons drum machine programming
- Rob Sabino – synthesizers, synth bass
- Curtis King – backing vocals
- Frank Simms – backing vocals
- George Simms – backing vocals

== Charts ==
=== Weekly charts ===
1985 weekly chart performance for "Dress You Up"
Chart (1985)	Peak position
Australia (Kent Music Report)	5
Belgium (Ultratop 50 Flanders)	5
Canada Top Singles (RPM)	10
European Hot 100 Singles (Music & Media)	6
Finland (Suomen virallinen lista)	23
France (SNEP)	18
Italy (Musica e dischi)	16
Ireland (IRMA)	3
Netherlands (Dutch Top 40)	5
Netherlands (Single Top 100)	7
New Zealand (Recorded Music NZ)	7
Spain (PROMUSICAE)	11
Switzerland (Schweizer Hitparade)	20
UK Singles (Official Charts)	5
US Billboard Hot 100	5
US Adult Contemporary (Billboard)	32
US Dance Club Songs (Billboard)	3
US Dance Singles Sales (Billboard)	1
US Hot R&B/Hip-Hop Songs (Billboard)	64
US Cash Box Top 100	7
US CHR & Pop Charts (Radio & Records)	2
West Germany (GfK)	20

2025 weekly chart performance for "Dress You Up"
Chart (2025)	Peak position
UK Singles Downloads Chart	93

=== Year-end charts ===
1985 year-end chart performance for "Dress You Up"
Chart (1985)	Position
Australia (Kent Music Report)	76
Belgium (Ultratop 50 Flanders)	64
France (SNEP)	77
Netherlands (Dutch Top 40)	83
Netherlands (Single Top 100)	71
UK Singles (Gallup)	100
US Billboard Hot 100	98
US Dance Singles Sales (Billboard)	13
US Cash Box Top 100	61

== Certifications and sales ==
Certifications and sales for "Dress You Up"
Region	Certification	Certified units/sales
Japan (Oricon Charts)	—	11,800
United Kingdom (BPI)	Silver	204,970

== Literary sources ==
- Bego, Mark (2000). Madonna: Blonde Ambition. Cooper Square Press. ISBN 978-0-8154-1051-5.
- Bogdnov, Vladimir; Erlewine, Michael; Erlewine, Stephen Thomas; Woodstra, Chris (2001). AllMusic Guide: The Experts' Guide to the Best CDs, Albus & Tapes. Backbeat Books. ISBN 978-0-87930-423-2.
- Easlea, Daryl (2012). Madonna: Blond Ambition. Backbeat Books. ISBN 978-1-61713-034-2.
- Fouz-Hernández, Santiago; Jarman-Ivens, Freya (2004). Madonna's Drowned Worlds. Ashgate Publishing, Ltd. ISBN 978-0-7546-3371-6.
- Gruen, John Jonas (1991). Keith Haring: The Authorized Biography. Simon & Schuster. ISBN 978-0-13-516113-5.
- Katz, Mike; Kott, Crispin (2018). Rock and Roll Explorer Guide to New York City. Globe Pequot Press. ISBN 978-1-4930-3704-9.
- McKeen, William (2000). Rock and Roll is Here to Stay. W. W. Norton & Company. ISBN 978-0-393-04700-4.
- Matthew-Walker, Robert (1991). Madonna: The Biography. Sidgwick & Jackson. ISBN 978-0-330-31482-4.
- Morgan, Michelle (2015). Madonna. Constable & Robinson. ISBN 978-0-7624-5621-5.
- Rooksby, Rikky (2004). The Complete Guide to the Music of Madonna. Omnibus Press. ISBN 978-0-7119-9883-4.
