= Madonna (album) =

Studio album by Madonna
- Released: July 27, 1983
- Recorded: April 1982 – May 1983
- Studios: Sigma Sound, New York City
- Genres: Synth-pop; electropop; dance-pop; post-disco
- Length: 40:47
- Labels: Sire; Warner Bros.
- Producers: Reggie Lucas; John "Jellybean" Benitez; Mark Kamins

Madonna chronology
Madonna (1983)	Like a Virgin (1984)

Madonna video chronology
Madonna (1984)	Madonna Live: The Virgin Tour (1985)

Singles from Madonna
- 1. "Everybody" Released: October 6, 1982; 2. "Burning Up" / "Physical Attraction" Released: March 9, 1983; 3. "Holiday" Released: September 7, 1983; 4. "Lucky Star" Released: September 9, 1983; 5. "Borderline" Released: February 15, 1984

Madonna is the debut studio album by American singer and songwriter Madonna. It was released on July 27, 1983, by Sire Records. In the late 1970s, Madonna had established herself as a singer in downtown New York City; alongside her Michigan boyfriend Stephen Bray, she put together a demo tape with four dance tracks and began pitching it around local nightclubs. She managed to get Mark Kamins, the resident DJ at Danceteria, to play one of those songs: "Everybody"; it drew positive reception from the crowd, and Kamins took Madonna to Sire Records, where label president Seymour Stein signed her to a deal for three twelve-inch singles. Following its release on October 6, 1982, "Everybody" found success in the dance scene, and the label approved the recording of an album.

For the album, Madonna worked with Warner Bros. producer Reggie Lucas, who had worked with artists such as Roberta Flack and Stephanie Mills, but problems soon arose between her and Lucas, as she was not happy with his production work and she invited John "Jellybean" Benitez, her boyfriend at the time, to work on and remix the rest of the album. Madonna is mostly a dance-pop and post-disco album, and features some of the newest technology of the time, including the LinnDrum drum machine, Moog bass, and Oberheim OB-X synthesizer. The songs mostly address love and partying. Five singles were released from the album: "Everybody" and "Burning Up" were released months before it was completed; neither song made a major impact on the charts. "Holiday" was Madonna's big breakout single, followed by "Lucky Star" and "Borderline".

Upon release, Madonna received generally positive reviews from critics, who highlighted its dance-oriented nature and sound. In the United States, it peaked at number eight on the Billboard 200 and was certified five-times platinum by the Recording Industry Association of America (RIAA). It reached the top ten of the charts in Australia, France, the Netherlands, New Zealand and the United Kingdom, and has sold an estimated 10 million copies worldwide. Between 1983 and 1984, Madonna promoted the album and singles through a series of live appearances in nightclubs and television programs across the United States and Europe. The singles were then performed on the Virgin Tour of 1985, Madonna's first concert tour. In retrospective reviews, Madonna has been referred to as one of the greatest debut albums of all time, and one of the best albums from the 1980s. Critics have also said that it helped to make dance music popular again and "set the standard" of dance-pop for decades afterwards; its influence can be seen in the work of female artists such as Janet Jackson, Debbie Gibson, Kylie Minogue, and Lady Gaga.

== Background ==
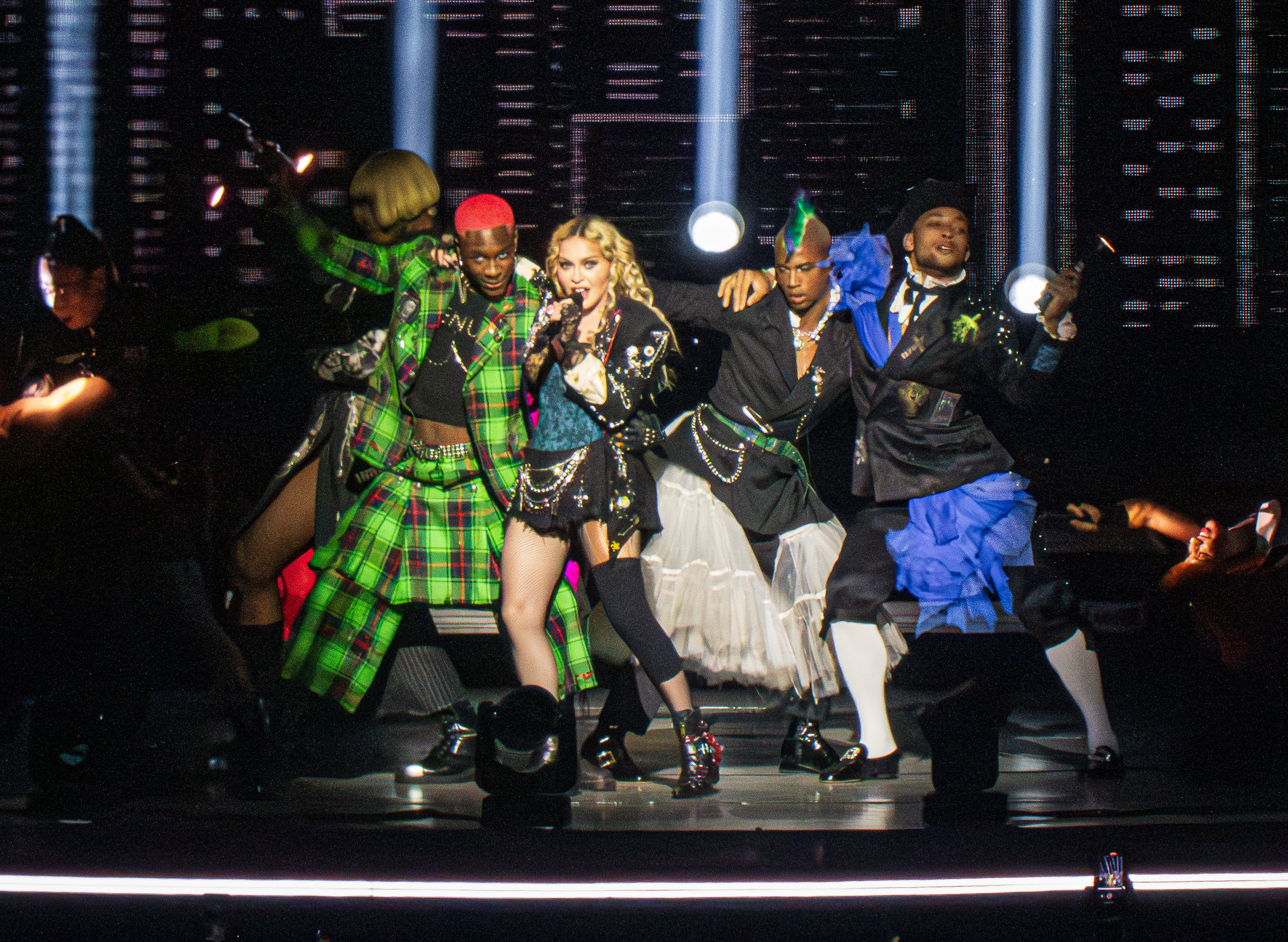
Madonna singing "Everybody" on the Celebration Tour (2023–2024). Released as her debut single, the song's success led her to be signed by Sire Records and offered a record deal.

In 1979, Madonna was trying to establish her music career in New York City. She was the drummer of a band called Breakfast Club, which was led by the Gilroy brothers, Dan and Ed. The following year, after a dispute with Dan, Madonna left the band. She then called her former Michigan boyfriend Stephen Bray, who "readily" agreed to join her in New York. Along with Gary Burke and Brian Syms, they formed a band called The Millionaires. Then, when the Gilroy brothers rejoined the group, they changed their name to Emmy, another of Madonna's many nicknames. In 1981, after attending one of Emmy's gigs at Max's Kansas City, Adam Alter and Camille Barbone from Gotham Records signed a contract with Madonna, who at this point already had a "small downtown cult following in the gay scene". However, the association was short-lived and ended the following year due to creative differences between the label and singer: Gotham was interested in rock and roll whereas Madonna wanted to pursue disco.

By 1982, Madonna was living with Bray in an unused rehearsal studio. After coming to the realization that "funky dance records were in style on the radio and dance floor", they created a demo tape with four dance tracks, including "Everybody", "Burning Up", and "Ain't No Big Deal", which was described as a "bright Michael Jackson/Donna Summer confection". Without a record label backing her, Madonna began pitching the tape on her own, visiting local nightclubs trying to get DJs to play it. She managed to get Mark Kamins, the resident DJ at Danceteria nightclub, to play "Everybody", which was met with a positive reception from the crowd. Kamins promised Madonna he would help her get a record deal on the condition that he would get to produce it. As he was also an A&R scout for Island Records, Kamins took the tape to his boss Chris Blackwell, but he was not impressed and was not interested in signing Madonna.

"Madonna is great. She will do anything to be a star, and that's exactly what I look for in an artist: total co-operation... With Madonna, I knew I had someone hot and co-operative, so I planned to build her career with singles, rather than just release an album right away and run the risk of disaster".

— Sire Records A&R executive Michael Rosenblatt on working with the singer.

Kamins then approached Sire Records president Seymour Stein, who at the time was at Lenox Hill Hospital recovering from heart surgery. Stein had his secretary send the tape to the hospital so he could listen to it; "I liked the hook, I liked Madonna's voice, I liked the feel [...] I liked it all and played it again", the executive recalled. He signed the singer to a deal for three twelve-inch singles with an option for albums; she would get $15,000 for each one, but would also have to pay for all recording costs. Sire A&E executive Michael Rosenblatt, who oversaw the entire process, wanted to release a double-sided single with "Ain't No Big Deal" as A-side and "Everybody" as B-side. "Ain't No Big Deal", however, "did not come out well", so Rosenblatt decided to put "Everybody" on both sides of the record: one version lasted 5:56, while the other was a dub version with a duration of 9:23. Since he had recorded the demo, Bray argued that he should be the producer for the single, but Stein decided to appoint Kamins, "for the sheer interest of seeing where it would go". Kamins, however, wasn't interested in producing, wanting to focus on A&R instead; he approached musician Kashif to see if he was interested in working on the song, but he turned down the offer. "Everybody" was released as Madonna's debut single on October 6, 1982. It failed to enter the Billboard Hot 100, peaking at number 7 on the Bubbling Under Hot 100. It was more successful on Billboard's Dance Club Songs chart, where it reached the third spot. Music promoter Bobby Shaw recalled that, "['Everybody'] made noise enough to earn her an album deal".

== Development and recording ==
According to Michael Rosenblatt, he wanted the album to have an "R&B feel", hence he brought in Warner Bros. producer Reggie Lucas, who had worked with artists such as Roberta Flack and Stephanie Mills. Rosenblatt also felt Madonna needed to work with someone who "could really help her with her vocals. Mark [Kamins]'s strength was grooves, not working with a girl who's never been in the studio before". Upon meeting her, Lucas wasn't impressed with the singer's "boho-punk style", and thought she didn't seem "particularly avant-garde". "Everybody" was recorded at Bob Blank's Blank Tape Recording Studios in April 1982, over three days. Barry Eastmond had been hired as the track's arranger, but left the project after getting into an argument with Madonna; she felt his work was "too slick", and lacked the "edge of the clubland grooves she was hankering after". Rosenblatt made the decision to replace Eastmond's keyboard parts, and it was Arthur Baker, an assistant to Kamins, who brought in Fred Zarr to redo all the keyboards.

"[S]he was unhappy with the whole [album], so I went in and sweetened up a lot of music for her, adding some guitars to 'Lucky Star', some voices, some magic. [...] I just wanted to do the best job I could do for her. When we would playback 'Holiday' or 'Lucky Star', you could see that she was overwhelmed by how great it all sounded."

— John "Jellybean" Benitez talking about working with Madonna on the album.

The remaining songs were recorded at the Sigma Sound Studios in New York. Prior to entering the studio, Madonna wrote three more songs for the album: "Lucky Star", "Think of Me" and "I Know It". The lyrics to "Lucky Star" were written on a yellow legal notepad, while the music was created on a Casiotone keyboard with a cassette player Kamins had given Madonna. She wrote it as a thank you to him, and with the hope that he'd play it in his sets at Danceteria. One of the earliest recorded versions of "Lucky Star" Madonna and Lucas created was described as being very "R&B-leaning", while another was heavy on guitars, but due to a negative experience involving Madonna and a rock guitarist, was quickly discarded. Soon, however, the singer realized there were not enough songs for the album, to which Lucas then brought in two compositions of his own: "Physical Attraction" and "Borderline", written specifically for Madonna. The latter was the first song where Lucas used a drum machine instead of a drummer; he and Madonna worked on the track while she was staying at artist Jean-Michel Basquiat's apartment. Problems arose between Madonna and Lucas, as she felt he was "moving [the songs] away from the sparse form of the original demos", something she did not approve of; the producer ended up leaving the project without altering the tracks. John "Jellybean" Benitez, her boyfriend at the time, remixed three songs that would appear on the album. In the case of "Burning Up" and "Lucky Star", Benitez added extra guitar riffs and additional vocals; for the latter he also added a "synthesized disco beat with soulful flourishes", and elements of New Wave.

Another issue arose after Madonna learned Bray had sold "Ain't No Big Deal" to disco act Barracuda, making it unavailable for her album. Benitez approached Curtis Hudson and Lisa Stevens-Crowder from the band Pure Energy, and asked them for a song. Titled "Holiday", the track was written by Hudson and Stevens-Crowder for Pure Energy, but their label Prism Records decided not to record it. "Holiday" had been previously offered to Mary Wilson of The Supremes, and Phyllis Hyman. After she was given the demo, Madonna quickly recorded the vocals. Benitez assembled the musicians, hummed the music to them, and asked the singer to sing in a "very soulful approach". Hudson played guitar, and his brother Raymond the bass; Madonna herself played the cowbell heard near the beginning, while background vocals were provided by Norma Jean Wright and Tina Baker. Just before it was completed, Benitez and Madonna took the tape to Zarr, so he could add what the singer referred to as "Zarrisms": "creative flourishes" that would provide the "finishing touches", which ended up being a piano solo near the end.

== Composition ==
"Borderline"
16-second sample of second track "Borderline". Lyrically, the song depicts a woman complaining of her lover's chauvinism, while Madonna's vocals were noted as being "more refined" than on her other songs.

AllMusic's Stephen Thomas Erlewine and Sal Cinquemai from Slant Magazine noted that Madonna is a dance-pop post-disco album. Most of its songs address "love, heartbreak and hedonism in general". In his book The Complete Guide to the Music of Madonna, author Rikky Rooksby wrote that the record's overall sound is "dissonant, upbeat synthetic disco". Instrumentation includes Linn drum machine, Moog bass and the OB-X synthesizer, some of the newest technology of the time. Opening track "Lucky Star" begins with the sound of a "shimmering, programmed" glissando, followed by "clanging rhythm guitars, synth atmospherics, and [a] chugging bass"; the lyrics are a double entendre and compare a lover's "heavenly body" with the stars in the sky, while the "simple" refrain refers to the nursery rhyme "Star Light, Star Bright". Second track "Borderline" has Madonna singing in a more "refined and expressive" way, and lyrically depicts a woman complaining of her lover's chauvinism. Its sound has been compared to Stephanie Mills' "Never Knew Love Like This Before" (1980), while the chord progression evokes Bachman–Turner Overdrive's "You Ain't Seen Nothing Yet" (1974); the inversions are similar to the sound of the 1970s, specifically disco, Philadelphia soul, and the work of Elton John.

"Burning Up" is a "yearning" new wave-influenced dance track, with lyrics that conflate sex with ambition. It has a "starker" arrangement brought about by bass, single guitar and drum machine. Also present are tom-tom drum beats—similar to those used in the work of Phil Collins—and electric guitars. The refrain is a repetition of the same three lines of the lyrics, while the bridge consists of a series of double entendres that describe what she is prepared to do for her lover, showcasing that she "has no shame" and is "not like the others". Fourth track "I Know It" features "shades of ’60s girl-group melodrama", with instrumentation from piano and saxophone. In the song, Madonna brushes off a lover who has hurt her. The next song is "Holiday", which talks about the "universal sentiment" that everybody needs a holiday from their everyday lives. It has been noted as being "devoid of any particular structure", and has a chord sequence comparable to that of Cyndi Lauper's "Time After Time" (1984). The refrain is sung by the singer in a "completely deadpan" way, while for the verses, she uses her lower register to give the lyrics a "more positive spin". Present throughout the song are "Chic-styled" guitar flickers, electronic clapping, and synthesized strings.

Sixth track "Think of Me" opens with high staccato piano notes, which are followed by the sound of drums. The R&B influenced song features a "slinky" saxophone solo near the middle, and has Madonna warning her lover to pay attention to her or she will leave him. Lasting almost seven minutes, "Physical Attraction" is the longest song on the album. It is a medium-paced track, in which Madonna "tellingly offer[s]" her permission to take things to the next level" over a "libidinous" bass line. Also present is a spoken section and "Collins-style" drums. Madonna's vocals were doubletracked for album closer "Everybody", which, in her own words, talks about "getting people to dance and lose their inhibitions". Billboard's Joe Lynch pointed out that the track "drops the bright, buoyant vibes that characterized the rest of the album and closes it on a dark, sensuous note".

== Artwork and release ==
According to Mary Cross, Lucky Star was the album's original title, but Madonna decided to change it, sensing a singular name could have more "star power". Her mother was also an inspiration, as she's "the only other person I have ever heard of named Madonna [...] It's pretty glamorous". The original cover was shot by photographer Edo Bertoglio, while the sleeve was designed by Madonna's friend Martin Burgoyne. According to Seymour Stein, however, Madonna dismissed this cover as it "just wasn't iconic enough". The official cover was shot by photographer Gary Heery and directed by Carin Goldberg. The image shows Madonna with short-cropped platinum hair, wearing a number of black rubber bangles on her hands and a dog chain around her throat. A journalist from Radio & Records described the singer as looking like "Marilyn Monroe crossed with Jean Harlow" in the image. The singer's navel is also prominent on the inner sleeve; she commented: "The picture inside the dust sleeve of my first album has me, like, in this Betty Boop pose with my belly button showing. Then when people reviewed the album, they kept talking about my cute belly button. [...] I think there are other unobvious places on the body that are sexy and the stomach is kind of innocent." Regarding the album photo shoot, Heery recalled:

[Madonna] arrived at my Broadway studio in New York with a small bag of clothes and jewelry, and no entourage. Then, in front of the camera she was explosive, like a great model, but with her own unique style. She came over the next day to see some prints and the proofs, and there was shot after shot to choose from. We agreed on every choice and whittled it down to the album cover images. I had no idea what I had just been a party to.

Madonna was released by Sire Records on July 27, 1983. The singer dedicated the album to her father, Tony Ciccone, with whom her relationship had not been good until its release. In an interview with Time magazine, Madonna explained: "My father had never believed that what I was doing here [in New York] was worthwhile, nor did he believe that I was up to any good. [...] It was not until my first album came out and my father started hearing my songs on the radio that he stopped asking questions." In 1985, in the "midst of 'Madonnamania'", the album was re-released in Europe, Australasia and certain Asian and Latin American territories as Madonna: The First Album, with a different cover created by George Holy. This image shows the singer with crucifixes as earrings. Of this, she said that "[wearing a crucifix] is kind of offbeat and interesting. I mean, everything I do is sort of tongue-in-cheek. Besides, [they] seem to go with my name." On May 22, 2001, Warner Bros. released a remastered version of the album with its original artwork and additional remixes of "Burning Up" and "Lucky Star". It was reissued on crystal clear vinyl on November 8, 2019.

== Promotion ==
=== Live performances and tour ===
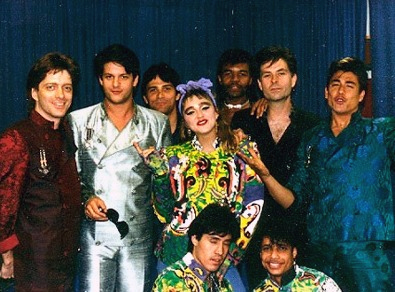
Backstage picture of Madonna and her entourage during the Virgin Tour.

Prior to the album's release, Madonna promoted the singles through a series of live appearances in nightclubs and television programs across the United States and Europe. She performed "Everybody" as part of Haoui Montaug's No Entiendes cabaret revue on December 18, 1982, on the second-floor stage of Danceteria. In 1983, she traveled to the United Kingdom and presented "Everybody" and "Burning Up" at London's Camden Palace, and Manchester's The Haçienda. "Holiday" was performed on June 4 at New York's Studio 54, and on October 13 at the Camden Palace. The following year, Madonna performed "Holiday" on the British television program Top of the Pops, where she was joined by her brother Christopher Ciccone; she also sang it on Discoring, The Tube, The Haçienda, and on American television programs American Bandstand and Solid Gold. (Note: Per multiple sources) Finally, in February 1984, Madonna appeared on The Dance Show and performed "Borderline", joined by her brother and dancer Erika Belle.

The album's singles were included on the Virgin Tour, Madonna's first concert tour, which visited cities in the US and Canada from April to June 1985. Warner Bros. wanted to capitalize on the success of Madonna's second studio album Like a Virgin (1984) and officially announced the tour on April 6. Despite mixed critical reviews, the tour was a commercial success, with Billboard reporting a gross of $3.3 million ($9.88 million in 2025 dollars); all 17,672 tickets for the concert at New York City's Radio City Music Hall sold out in a record-breaking 34 minutes. On top of that, young girls would show up to the concerts dressed in styles similar to Madonna's. One of the Detroit concerts was filmed and released in VHS as Madonna Live: The Virgin Tour.

=== Singles ===
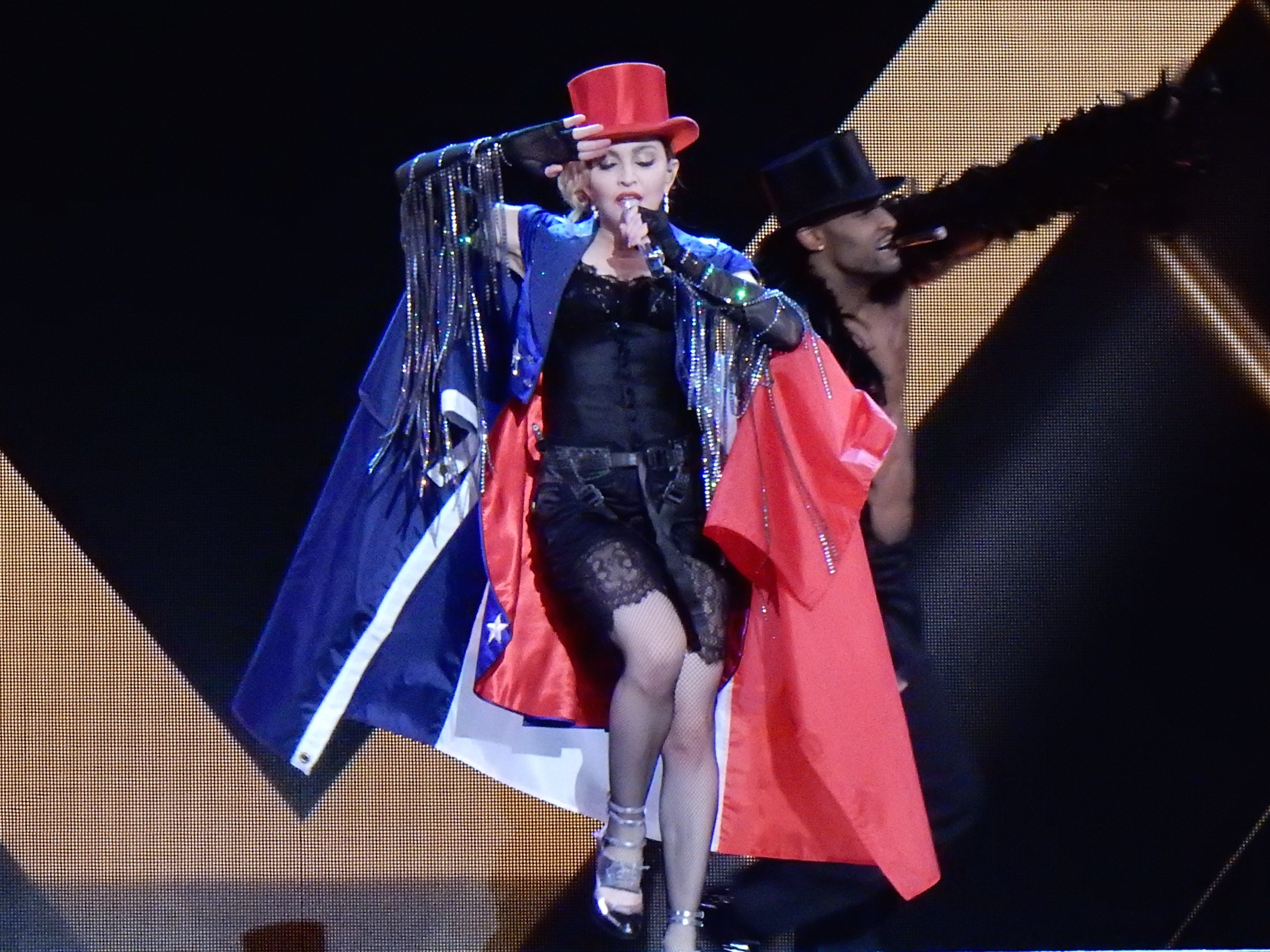
Madonna performing third single "Holiday" on the 2015–2016 Rebel Heart Tour. The song was her first entry on the Billboard Hot 100, peaking at number 16.

The twelve-inch single of "Everybody" was released on October 6, 1982. Due to its R&B elements and not including Madonna's image on the cover artwork, marketing for the song gave the impression that she was a black artist. That misconception was cleared with the song's music video, which was directed by Ed Steinberg, and shows the singer and two backup dancers performing at New York's Paradise Garage. "Burning Up" was released in a double-sided single with "Physical Attraction" on March 9, 1983. It was Madonna's first top-20 hit in Australia and, like its predecessor, peaked at number three on the Dance Club Songs chart. The music video was directed by Steve Barron and shows the singer writhing submissively in the middle of the street. Some authors noted that the visual was an introduction to the singer's "sexual politics". The double-sided single of "Lucky Star" and "Holiday" was issued in mid-August 1983, and became Madonna's first number one on Billboard's Dance Club Songs chart.

On September 7, "Holiday" was released as the album's third stand-alone single. Considered Madonna's breakthrough, it was her first entry on the Hot 100, where it reached number 16. "Holiday" also reached the top ten in the United Kingdom, where it remains one of Madonna's best-selling singles. In Europe and the United Kingdom, "Lucky Star" was first released on September 9, whereas in the United States it was released almost one year later, on August 8, 1984. "Lucky Star" peaked at number four on the Hot 100, becoming the singer's first top-five hit. The music video was directed by Arthur Pierson and shows the singer, her brother Christopher, and Belle dancing in front of a white backdrop. Following the clip's release, the singer's fashion and style became a trend among younger audiences of the time.

In the United States, "Borderline" was released on February 15, 1984, as the fourth single from the album; in the United Kingdom, it was published as the album's fifth single on June 2, 1984. To "keep Madonna mania going", a second European release followed in January 1986. It was commercially successful: in 1984, it gave Madonna her first top-ten hit on the Hot 100. The 1986 release was successful across Europe: it became the singer's second number one in Ireland, and reached the top three in the United Kingdom, Belgium, and the Netherlands. In the music video, which was directed by Mary Lambert, Madonna portrays the girlfriend of a Hispanic man, to whom she returns after being enticed to pose and model for a white British photographer. Author Douglas Kellner pointed out that with the visual, the singer broke the taboo of interracial relationships.

=== Video compilation ===
A VHS video compilation titled Madonna was made available in December 1984; it included the videos for "Borderline", "Burning Up", "Like a Virgin", and a "special extended dance mix" of "Lucky Star". The release topped Billboard's Music Videocassette chart from April 13 to November 9, 1985, and was the year's best-selling music videocassette. Additionally, Madonna was certified platinum by the Recording Industry Association of America (RIAA) for shipments of 100,000 units, and was recognized as the "Best Selling Video Cassette Merchandised as Music Video" by the National Association of Recording Merchandisers. According to The Saturday Evening Post, the video has sold over one million copies. To promote the release, a party was held at Chicago's Cabaret Metro on February 9, 1985. Dubbed "The Virgin Party", it drew a crowd of around 1,200 people; attendees were encouraged to wear white, and for a $5 admission fee, could view the Madonna videocassette and the music video of the then-upcoming "Material Girl". The event was organized as a drive to promote music videos, which did not yet have a large market.

== Critical reception ==
=== Contemporaneous ===
Contemporaneous reviews
Review scores
Source	Rating
Christgau's Record Guide	A−
Music Week	2/5 stars
Orlando Sentinel	3/5 stars
Rolling Stone	3/5 stars
Smash Hits	6/10

Madonna received generally positive reviews. Billboard and Rolling Stone, among other sources, praised Madonna's voice. Critics found it distinctive, saying it made the "pretty standard dance tunes" "a bit special", and included an addictive "distinguishing feature" of a "girlish hiccup".

Jeff Simon, music critic for The Buffalo News, predicted Madonna would overtake Debbie Harry as "blonde dance-rock queen". The production was also considered high-quality and pristine; its dance style was described as "music-and-motion" and as likely to "go down a storm in discos." Explained Simon, "she debuts by veering between the electric and pop sides of electro-pop and sounds good either way." Marcia Smith opened her review for The Boston Globe, "combine Madonna's vocal energy with a strong, driving beat and you have the makings of this hot dance album." Less positively, Dave Rimmer of Smash Hits argued Madonna's music suffered from attempting to be "Madonna Summer". Richard Defendorf, music critic for Orlando Sentinel, opined: "Madonna not only turns out some decent tunes (...) in a straight and clean musical style, but her lyrics – usually simple disco fare – twist neatly around the perpetually gyrating sounds produced by her backup musicians". However, he criticized her "tiny" voice. Music Week felt that Madonna "tends to sound like a different singer on every track" and predicted that the album would only find success "through the dance music market", though opined that the "Rachel Sweet-type pop tracks could attract interest elsewhere".

A strongly unfavorable review came from The Arizona Republic's Woody Wilson. He dismissively categorized the genre as "Chipmunks in Discoland", with a "cross between Brenda Lee and Alvin and the Chipmunks" over an extremely simple drum-machine-and-synth arrangement. Madonna's songwriting and lyrics were frequently criticized.

=== Retrospective ===
Retrospective reviews and music guides
Review scores
Source	Rating
AllMusic	5/5 stars
Blender	3/5 stars
Entertainment Weekly	A
MusicHound Rock	2/5 stars
Pitchfork	8.2/10
The Rolling Stone Album Guide	3.5/5 stars
Slant Magazine	3.5/5 stars
Spin Alternative Record Guide	8/10
Tom Hull – on the Web	A−
The Virgin Encyclopedia of Nineties Music	3/5 stars

For Matthew Rettenmund, author of Encyclopedia Madonnica, Madonna is "one of the most auspicious musical debuts of the 80s". The Quietus' Matthew Lindsay called it one of the singer's best and a "simple soundtrack to complicated times", and Stephen Thomas Erlewine gave it a perfect five-star review for AllMusic. Joseph Earp from Australian website Junkee referred to Madonna as "uneven, but in an exciting rather than disappointing way", "at once endearingly cautious [...] and shockingly self-assured". While the staff of The Advocate highlighted the singles, they felt album cuts such as "I Know It" and "Think of Me", "sound like B-sides for a Lisa Lisa single". The album's overall tone was reported to be energetic and joyful.

Sal Cinquemani said Madonna sounds "just as fresh today as it did almost two decades ago", while some Madonna book authors described its production as a "trifle flat" and said it "now sounds rather harsh". Some reviews from the 2010s found its 1980s synth-pop tropes simultaneously futuristic. Erlewine described its instrumental and vocal elements as "utterly irresistible" combined despite being uninteresting on their own. The album's dance style was also widely discussed and was variously categorized as post-disco, "club-disco", and disco-influenced. Phrases such as "infectiously kinetic" and "really fucking fun" also described it. Jim Farber from Entertainment Weekly wrote that Madonna's ability to mix it with "peerless pop" had been established on the album and set her apart from other post-disco acts. Vice called it "bright, sexy, and unfussy pop [that] doesn't falter once". Some writers considered it a classic but not one of Madonna's most mature works, with little indication of her later groundbreaking work. Rikky Rooksby, author of The Complete Guide to the Music of Madonna, dismissed it as "musical candyfloss, okay in the right spot at the right time".

The vibes of New York City were also felt by critics. One stated it "feels wrenched straight out of Danceteria" and another noticed the "grit" of the city's art scene. According to Daryl Easley, in his book Madonna: Blond Ambition, "[Madonna] represents the heat and rush of a city [New York] and marks the last time [she] would be writing directly at street level". Portland Mercury's Mark Lore also perceived a punk rock attitude and a similarity to Devo and Gary Numan in its synthesizers.

== Commercial performance ==
In the United States, the album debuted on the Billboard 200 chart at number 190 on the week of September 3, 1983. It had a slow and steady climb, ultimately peaking at number eight in the week ending October 20, 1984, more than a year after its release. Madonna also reached number 20 of the Top R&B/Hip-Hop Albums chart. Within a year, the album had sold 2.8 million copies in the United States. By the end of 1985, it ranked 25th on the year-end albums chart. Seventeen years after its release, the album was certified five-times platinum by the Recording Industry Association of America (RIAA) for shipments of five million copies in the United States. With the advent of the Nielsen SoundScan era in 1991, the album had sold a further 450,000 copies as of August 2010. In Canada, the album debuted at number 87 on the RPM chart on March 10, 1984. After six weeks, on April 14, it reached number 57. Madonna re-entered the chart at number 95 on August 4; it reached its peak at number 16 during its 29th week on the chart, and remained on the chart for 47 weeks. Madonna was 1984's 50th best-selling album in Canada.

In the United Kingdom, the record debuted at number 85 on the albums chart in the week ending February 11, 1984; almost two months later, in the week of April 20, it reached number 37. On July 13, 1985, following the Madonna: The First Album re-release, it re-entered the chart at number 91, eventually peaking at number 6 five weeks later. In December, the album was certified Platinum by the British Phonographic Industry (BPI) for shipments of 300,000 copies. Throughout Europe, the record achieved moderate success; in Spain, despite not charting during its initial release, it was certified Gold by the Productores de Música de España (PROMUSICAE) association for shipments of 50,000 copies. It was not until November 2019 that Madonna entered the Spanish album charts at number 35. The album reached the top ten of the charts in the Netherlands and France; it was less successful in Sweden and Italy, barely cracking the top 50. Madonna went on to reach number 14 on the European Top 100 Albums chart.

In Australia, the album peaked at the 10th spot of the Kent Music Report albums chart, and received a Triple Platinum certification by the Australian Recording Industry Association (ARIA). In New Zealand, it reached the chart's sixth spot and was certified Platinum by the Recording Industry Association of New Zealand (RIANZ). In Japan, Madonna reached number 20 of the Oricon albums chart. In Hong Kong, it was granted a Platinum certification for shipments of 20,000 copies. Worldwide, Madonna has sold over 10 million copies.

== Accolades ==
Awards and nominations
Organization	Year	Category	Result	Ref.
Cash Box Year-End Awards	1984	Black Contemporary Album Awards	40th place	
NARM Best Seller Awards	1985	Best-Selling Black Music Album by a Female Artist	Nominated	
NARM Best Seller Awards	1985	Best-Selling Album by a New Artist	Won (Note: Tied with Eddie and the Cruisers by John Cafferty and the Beaver Brown Band and She's So Unusual by Cyndi Lauper.)	

== Legacy ==
"A sexy, forward-thinking record that took pop in a new direction. Its success showed that, with the right diva at the helm, music similar to disco could find a place in the white mainstream—a call to the dance floor answered by everyone from Kylie to Robyn to Gaga to Madonna herself".

— Pitchfork's Jill Mapes commenting on the album.

Madonna has been referred to as one of the greatest debut albums of all time. It has also been mentioned among the best albums from the 1980s. With the album, Madonna has been credited with "revolutionizing" dance music. Stephen Thomas Erlewine wrote: "[Madonna's] eponymous debut isn't simply good, it set the standard for dance-pop for the next 20 years". Erlewine went on to explain that the album was released in an era when disco was seen as an "anathema" to mainstream music; by incorporating "great pop songs with stylish, state-of-the-art beats", Madonna played a "huge role in popularizing dance music as popular music again", Erlewine concluded. Similarly, Spin's Michaelangelo Matos said that it "reinvigorated disco for a generation that wanted nothing to do with polyester suits, ending an era and birthing a new one". Rosenblatt himself went on to explain: "There was disco, and there was new wave. And there was nothing in the middle [...] Madonna was really coming out of the new wave clubs in a way that never really happened before. Nobody was doing the disco/new wave thing, [the] R&B thing the way Madonna did". The staff of Rolling Stone added that, "[Madonna] put downtown New York electro grooves all over the Top 40". In Vice's ranking of the "99 Greatest Dance Albums of All Time"—where Madonna came in at number 26—the staff concluded that with the record, the singer "provided the New York City dance scene a much needed post-disco palate cleanser and drew the blueprint for future dance pop". Joey Guerra from the Houston Chronicle elaborated:

The album's blend of pop, disco, New Wave and R&B is ubiquitous today. But at the time, it was a revelation. Disco had been metaphorically demolished a few years earlier. New Wave was still seen by many as eccentric and weird. Madonna, who came up in New York City's club scene, tempered those sounds with her fierce ambition and desire to be a superstar.

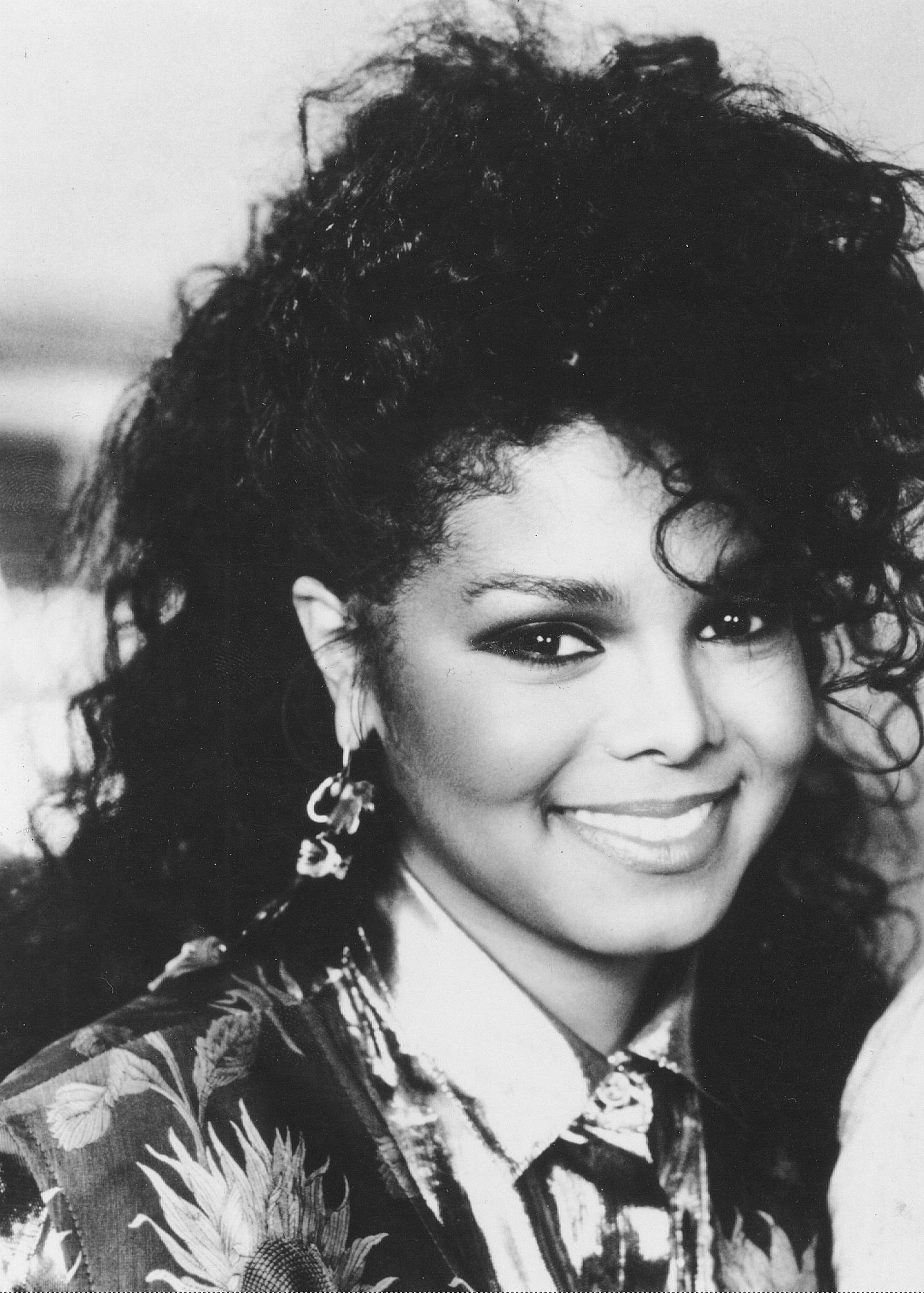
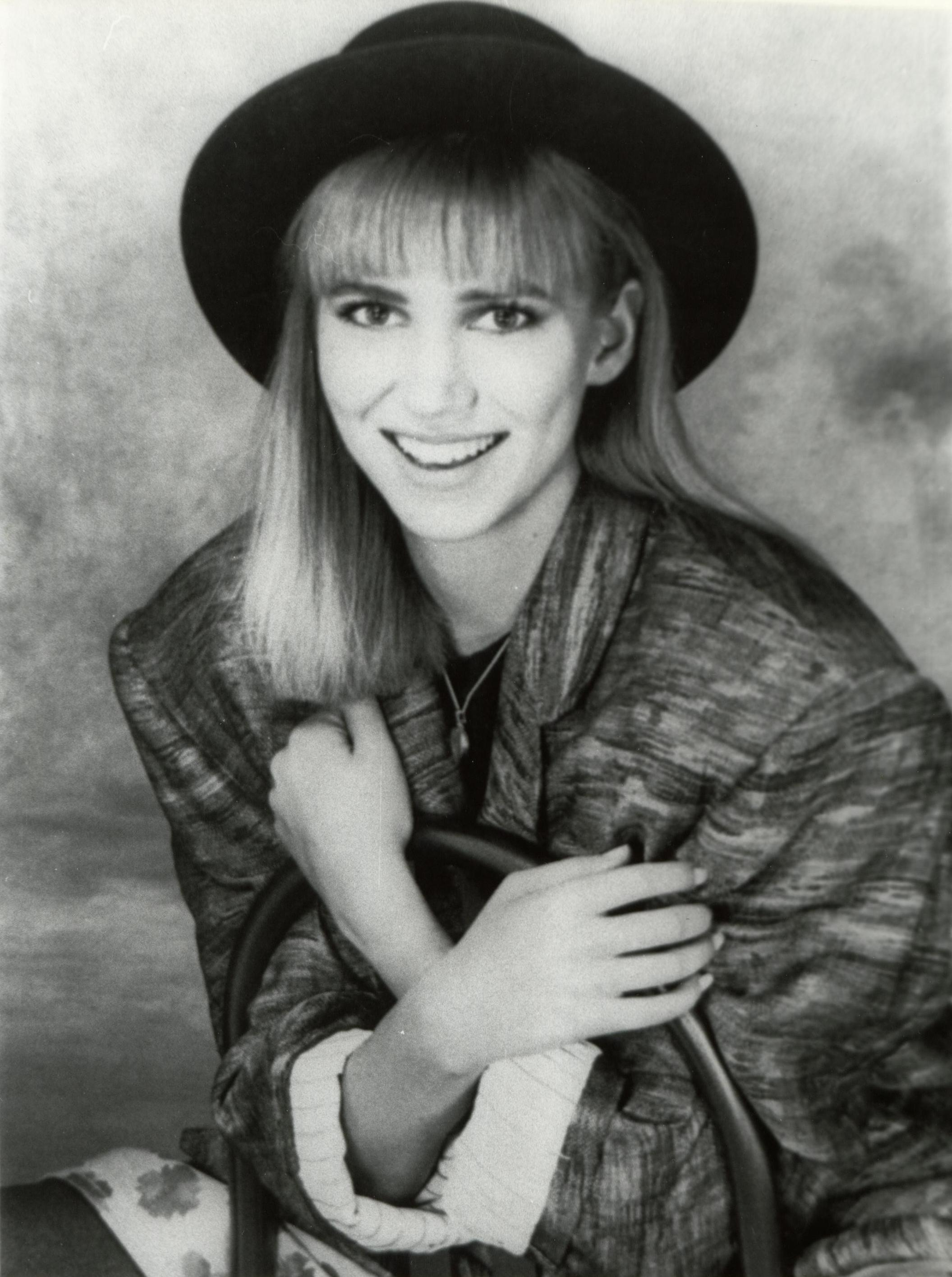
Rolling Stone credited the album for "pointing the direction" for female singers of the time, such as Janet Jackson (left) and Debbie Gibson (right).

Santiago Fouz-Hernández and Freya Jarman-Ivens, authors of Madonna's Drowned Worlds, wrote that the album features "several key trends that have continued to define [Madonna's] success [...] a strong dance-based idiom, catchy hooks [and] highly polished arrangements". They came to the conclusion that the singer introduced a style of "upbeat dance music" that would prove "particularly appealing" to gay audiences. Paste's Matt Michell declared: "Without Madonna, the landscape of dance music suffers greatly. It’s the best debut album of the 1980s by a woman, and, perhaps, one of the greatest debuts of all time". Both Andrew Morton and Martin Charles Strong agreed that the album helped to make Madonna a household name and to establish her base as an artist. The influence of the singer and album can be seen in the work of other female artists such as Janet Jackson, Alisha, Debbie Gibson, Britney Spears, Beyoncé, Lady Gaga and Kylie Minogue. Marcus Wratten from PinkNews added: "Her music is, and always will be, the blueprint for the best pop records of our generation. And it all began with Madonna".

For Entertainment Weekly, Kyle Anderson wrote: "Madonna’s sound, and of course her look would be heavily copied for years to come, but [the album] heralded something much bigger: the arrival of the pop diva as a singular force who put personality above all else". Mark Lore added that, "[Madonna] had a confidence and sexuality that hadn't been captured since Donna Summer. It was just what pop music needed". Finally, for Rolling Stone, the album's biggest achievement was "introducing the most important female voice in the history of modern music".

== Track listing ==
All tracks are written by Madonna, except where noted.

Side one
No.	Title	Writer(s)	Producer(s)	Length
1.	"Lucky Star"		Reggie Lucas; John "Jellybean" Benitez^{[a]}	5:34
2.	"Borderline"	Lucas	Lucas	5:16
3.	"Burning Up"		Lucas; Benitez^{[a]}	3:43
4.	"I Know It"		Lucas	3:44
Total length:				18:17

Side two
No.	Title	Writer(s)	Producer(s)	Length
5.	"Holiday"	Curtis Hudson; Lisa Stevens	Benitez	6:07
6.	"Think of Me"		Lucas	4:52
7.	"Physical Attraction"	Lucas	Lucas; Benitez^{[a]}	6:36
8.	"Everybody"		Mark Kamins	4:55
Total length:				22:30 40:47

Notes

- ^{^a} Signifies a remixer/additional producer.
- The original LP version of "Burning Up", running 4:48, was replaced on later reissues of the album.
- The 2001 remastered edition of the album features the full-length version of "Everybody", running 6:02.
- The 2001 remastered edition of the album features the 12" Version of "Burning Up" as track 9 and the New Mix of "Lucky Star" as track 10.

== Personnel ==
Adapted from the album's liner notes.

Musicians

- Madonna – lead vocals, background vocals, cowbell (5)
- Dean Gant – synthesizers, acoustic piano, electric piano
- Ed Walsh – synthesizers
- Fred Zarr – synthesizers, electric piano, acoustic piano (5), Fender Rhodes (5), Oberheim OB-X (5), Moog bass (5), drums (5), co-arrangements (5)
- Paul Pesco – guitars (1, 3)
- Reggie Lucas – guitars, LinnDrum programming
- Ira Siegel – guitars
- Russ Powell – guitar
- Curtis Hudson – guitars (5), arrangements (5)
- Anthony Jackson – electric bass (2)
- Raymond Hudson – bass (5)
- Leslie Ming – LinnDrum programming
- Bashiri Johnson – percussion (5)
- Bob Malach – tenor saxophone
- Chrissy Faith – background vocals
- Gwen Guthrie – background vocals
- Brenda White – background vocals
- Norma Jean Wright – background vocals
- Tina B. – background vocals (5)

Production

- Reggie Lucas – producer (1–4, 6, 7)
- John "Jellybean" Benitez – producer (5), remixing (1, 3, 7)
- Mark Kamins – producer (8)
- Jim Dougherty – sound engineer (1–4, 6, 7)
- Jay Mark – remix engineer (1, 3, 7), mixing engineer (5)
- Michael Hutchinson – sound engineer (5)
- Butch Jones – sound engineer (8)
- Ted Jensen – audio mastering at Sterling Sound (New York City)
- Freddy DeMann – management
- Ron Weisner – management

Design

- Carin Goldberg – art direction
- Gary Heery – photography
- George Holy – photography (Madonna: The First Album)

== Charts ==
=== Weekly charts ===
Weekly chart performance for Madonna
Chart (1983–2019)	Peak position
Australia (Kent Music Report)	10
Austrian Albums (Ö3 Austria)	15
Canada Top Albums/CDs (RPM)	16
Croatian International Albums (HDU)	2
Danish Albums (Hitlisten)	57
Dutch Albums (Album Top 100)	7
European Top 100 Albums (Eurotipsheet)	14
French Albums (SNEP)	8
Finnish Albums (Suomen virallinen lista)	38
German Albums (Offizielle Top 100)	28
Greek Albums (IFPI Greece)	29
Hungarian Albums (MAHASZ)	18
Italian Albums (FIMI)	50
Japanese LP Albums (Oricon)	20
New Zealand Albums (RMNZ)	6
Scottish Albums (Official Charts)	48
South African Albums (RiSA)	65
Spanish Albums (Promusicae)	35
Swedish Albums (Sverigetopplistan)	43
UK Albums (Official Charts)	6
UK Dance Albums (Music Week)	8
US Billboard 200	8
US Top Dance Albums (Billboard)	12
US Top R&B/Hip-Hop Albums (Billboard)	20

Weekly chart performance for Madonna (video)
Chart (1985)	Position
UK Music Videos (Music Week)	1
US Top Music Videocassette (Billboard)	1
US Top 15 Music Videocassettes (Cash Box)	1

=== Monthly charts ===
Monthly chart performance for Madonna
Chart (2018)	Position
Croatian International Albums (HDU)	3

=== Year-end charts ===
1984 year-end chart performance for Madonna
Chart (1984)	Position
Australia (Kent Music Report)	10
Canada Top Albums/CDs (RPM)	50
US Top R&B/Hip-Hop Albums (Billboard)	15
US Top 100 Albums (Cash Box)	41

1985 year-end chart performance for Madonna
Chart (1985)	Position
Dutch Albums (MegaCharts)	95
New Zealand Albums (RMNZ)	28
US Billboard 200	25

1986 year-end chart performance for Madonna
Chart (1986)	Position
Dutch Albums (MegaCharts)	12
UK Albums (OCC)	55

Year-end chart performance for Madonna (video)
Chart (1985)	Position
UK Music Videos (Gallup)	2
US Videocassette Sales (Billboard)	28

== Certifications and sales ==
Certifications and available sales for Madonna
Region	Certification	Certified units/sales
Argentina	—	140,000
Australia (ARIA)	3× Platinum	250,000
Brazil	—	310,000
Canada	—	100,000 (Note: According to RPM, the album attained sales of over platinum-equivalent as of 1985. A platinum meant 100,000 copies at that time in Canadian terms.)
France (SNEP)	Platinum	300,000^{*}
Germany (BVMI)	Gold	250,000^{^}
Hong Kong (IFPI Hong Kong)	Platinum	20,000^{*}
Israel	—	10,000
Italy (AFI)	Gold	210,000
Japan	—	89,710
Netherlands (NVPI)	Platinum	100,000^{^}
New Zealand (RMNZ)	Platinum	15,000^{^}
South Africa (RISA)	Gold	25,000
Spain (Promusicae)	Gold	50,000^{^}
United Kingdom (BPI)	Platinum	300,000^{^}
United States (RIAA)	5× Platinum	5,000,000^{^}
Summaries
Worldwide	—	10,000,000
^{*} Sales figures based on certification alone.^{^} Shipments figures based on certification alone.

Certifications for Madonna (video)
Region	Certification	Certified units/sales
Australia (ARIA)	Gold	7,500^{^}
United States (RIAA)	Platinum	100,000^{^}
Summaries
Worldwide	—	1,000,000
^{^} Shipments figures based on certification alone.

== Bibliography ==
- Andrews, Marc (2022). Madonna: Song by Song. Fonthill Media. ISBN 978-1781558447.
- Bego, Mark (2000). Madonna: Blonde Ambition. Rowman & Littlefield. ISBN 978-0-8154-1051-5.
- Ciccone, Christopher; Leigh, Wendy (2008). Life with My Sister Madonna. Simon & Schuster. ISBN 978-1-4165-8762-0.
- Claro, Nicole (2000). Madonna. Chelsea House Publishers. ISBN 9780791023303.
- Clerk, Carol (2002). Madonnastyle. Music Sales Group. ISBN 0-7119-8874-9.
- Cross, Mary (2007). Madonna: A Biography. Greenwood Publishing Group. ISBN 978-0-313-33811-3.
- Dean, Maury (2003). Rock 'n' Roll Gold Rush: A Singles Un-Cyclopedia. Algora Publishing. ISBN 0-87586-207-1.
- Easlea, Daryl (2012). Madonna: Blond Ambition. Backbeat Books. ISBN 9781617130342.
- Fouz-Hernández, Santiago; Jarman-Ivens, Freeya (2004). Madonna's Drowned Worlds. Ashgate Publishing, Ltd. ISBN 0-7546-3372-1.
- Gnojewski, Carol (2008). Madonna: Express Yourself. Enslow Publishing. ISBN 978-0-7660-2442-7.
- Grayer Moore, Jennifer (2015). Fashion Fads Through American History. ABC-Clio. ISBN 9781610699020.
- Katz, Mike; Kott, Crispin (2018). Rock and Roll Explorer Guide to New York City. Rowman & Littlefield. ISBN 9781493037049.
- Kellner, Douglas (1995). Media Culture: Cultural Studies, Identity, and Politics Between the Modern and the Postmodern. Routledge. ISBN 0-415-10570-6.
- Metz, Allen; Benson, Carol (1999). The Madonna Companion: Two Decades of Commentary. Music Sales Group. ISBN 978-0-8256-7194-4.
- Morgan, Michelle (2015). Madonna. Hachette. ISBN 978-1472119438.
- Morton, Andrew (2001). Madonna. St. Martin's Press. ISBN 0-312-28786-0.
- O'Brien, Lucy (2008). Madonna: Like an Icon. Bantam Press. ISBN 978-0-593-05547-2.
- Rettenmund, Matthew (1995). Encyclopedia Madonnica. St. Martin's Press. ISBN 0-312-11782-5.
- Rooksby, Rikky (2004). The Complete Guide to the Music of Madonna. Omnibus Press. ISBN 0-7119-9883-3.
- Strong, Martin C. (2004). The Great Rock Discography. Canongate Books. ISBN 1841956155.
- Stein, Seymour; Murphy, Gareth (2018). Siren Song: My Life in Music. St. Martin's Press. ISBN 978-1250081018.
- Tassoni, Leo (1993). Madonna (in Spanish). Icaria Editorial. ISBN 9788474262070.
- Taraborrelli, Randy J. (2008). Madonna: An Intimate Biography. Simon & Schuster. ISBN 9780330454469.
