= Like a Virgin (album) =

1984 studio album by Madonna

Studio album by Madonna
- Released: November 12, 1984
- Recorded: April – May 1984
- Studios: Power Station, New York City
- Genres: Dance-pop; post-disco
- Length: 38:34
- Labels: Sire; Warner Bros.
- Producer: Nile Rodgers

Madonna chronology
Madonna (1983)	Like a Virgin (1984)	Like a Virgin & Other Big Hits! (1985)

Singles from Like a Virgin
- 1. "Like a Virgin" Released: October 31, 1984; 2. "Material Girl" Released: January 23, 1985; 3. "Angel / Into the Groove" Released: April 10, 1985; 4. "Dress You Up" Released: July 31, 1985

Like a Virgin is the second studio album by American singer and songwriter Madonna. It was released on November 12, 1984, by Sire Records. Following the success of her 1983 eponymous debut album, Madonna was eager to start working on its follow-up. She selected Nile Rodgers to produce the album due to his work on Let's Dance (1983) by David Bowie, of which she was a fan. To ensure it was exactly as she envisioned it, Madonna chose all the songs for the album: she penned five of her own, four of which were co-written with former boyfriend and collaborator Stephen Bray, and four were written by other artists. Recording sessions took place at Power Station studio in New York City. Rodgers enlisted the help of his former Chic bandmates Bernard Edwards and Tony Thompson.

Upon release, Like a Virgin received mixed reviews from music critics: Rodgers's production received praise, but Madonna's vocals were criticized. It became Madonna's first number-one album on the Billboard 200, as well as the first album by a female artist to sell over five million copies in the United States. The Recording Industry Association of America (RIAA) later certified it diamond for shipments of ten million units. Internationally, it reached number one in Germany, the Netherlands, New Zealand, Spain, Italy and the United Kingdom. With sales of over 21 million copies worldwide, Like a Virgin remains one of the best-selling albums of all time. In the United States, four singles were released from the album —all reached the top five of the Billboard Hot 100, with the title track becoming Madonna's first number one, and "Material Girl" reaching number two.

The album was promoted on Madonna's first concert tour, the Virgin Tour (1985), which visited cities across North America. Like a Virgin is credited with establishing Madonna as a superstar and proving she was not a one-hit wonder, while her fashion style during this era was widely emulated by teens and young women. In 2023, the Library of Congress selected the album for preservation in the National Recording Registry, citing its "cultural, historical, or aesthetic significance."

== Background ==
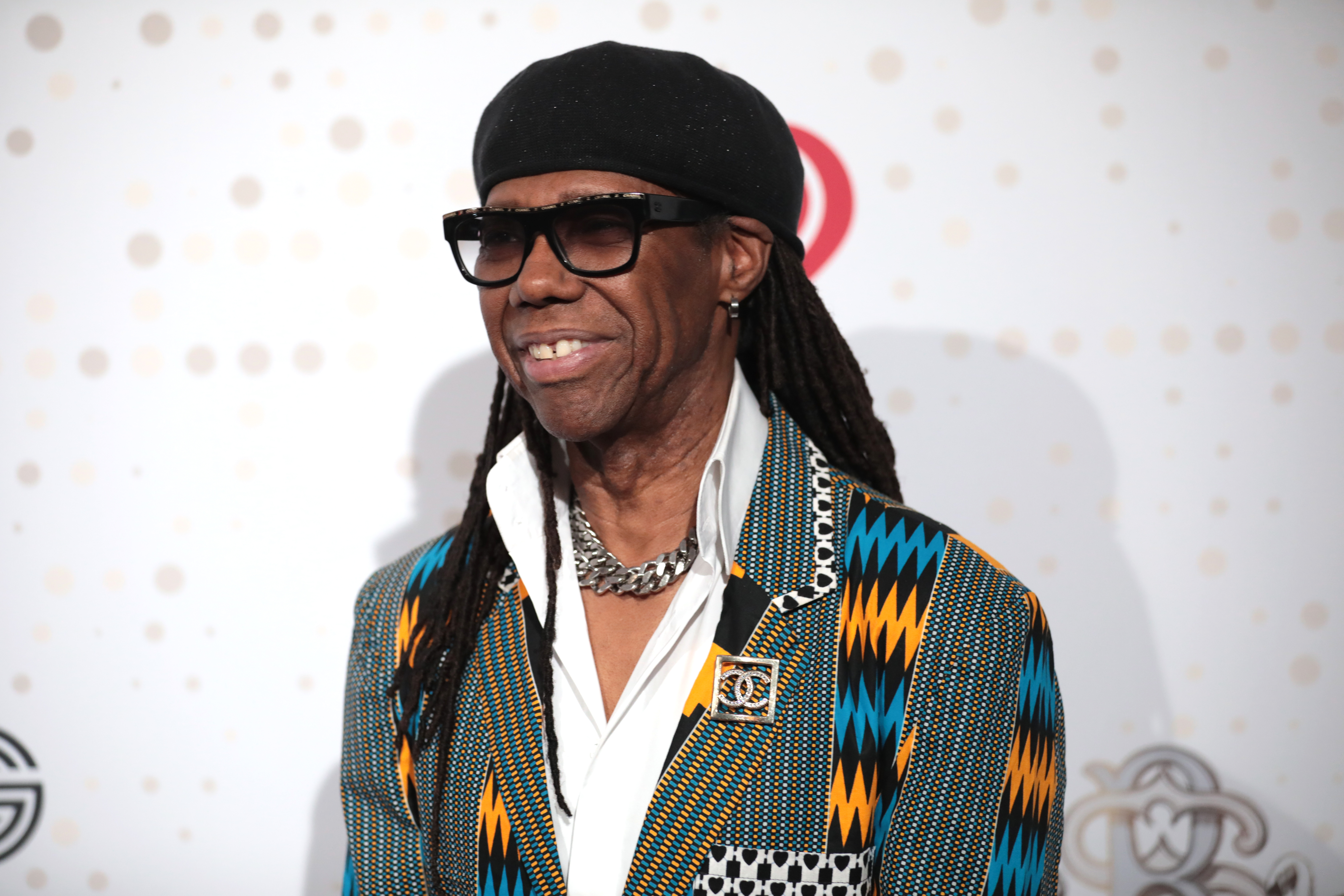
Madonna chose Nile Rodgers (pictured) to produce Like a Virgin, due to his work with David Bowie.

Following the release of her 1983 self-titled debut album, and hit singles like "Holiday", "Lucky Star" and "Borderline", Madonna became, according to author Craig Rosen, "one of the most exciting new artists of the 1980s". Despite this, the singer was not entirely pleased with how her first album had turned out, and was eager to start working on its follow-up. Of her upcoming second album, she told British magazine NME: "The production won't be so slick, because where Reggie [Lucas] and Mtume come from is a whole different school. I want a sound that's mine", and even hinted at working with a British producer. To ensure the album be exactly as she envisioned it, Madonna asked her label, Sire Records, to allow her to produce the album herself, a request that was immediately denied.

Angry with the label, the singer would publicly vent during interviews, and refer to her bosses as a "hierarchy of old men [...] a chauvinistic environment to be working in because I'm treated like this sexy little girl". The executives at Sire decided to allow Madonna to work with any producer of her choice. She picked Nile Rodgers, co-founder of American disco band Chic, and main producer of David Bowie's Let's Dance (1983), one of her favorite albums of the time. Rodgers had previously met Madonna after attending one of her gigs at a New York City nightclub, and was impressed with her stage presence; "I kept thinking to myself, 'Damn, is she a star', but she wasn't at that time. I always wanted to work with her and this seemed like the perfect opportunity". However, when the time came he initially hesitated, as he had been warned by several people that Madonna was a "totally self-centered bitch" and a "pain in the ass to work with". When the two actually met, Rodgers quickly changed his mind and said the singer was great and a "true professional". Madonna, by her part, "couldn't believe that the record company actually gave me the money so that I could work with [Rodgers]".

== Development ==
"Like a Virgin is a much harder album, much more aggressive than the first [one]. The songs on that were pretty weak. On this one I've chosen all the songs and I want them to be all hits—no fillers. That's why I've done outside songs as well as six of my own".

— Madonna on Like a Virgin.

Madonna wanted Like a Virgin to be "stronger" than her debut, hence she chose all the songs herself. She had been penning songs and creating demos with former boyfriend and collaborator Stephen Bray since early 1984. When Madonna first met with Rodgers, she allegedly told him, "if you don't love these songs we can't work together", to which the producer responded: "I don't love them now, but I will when I've finished working on them!". Around the time they began working on the album, Billy Steinberg and Tom Kelly were pitching songs to artists. Steinberg had begun a new relationship and came up with the lyrics to "Like a Virgin". He brought the track to Kelly, who created the music and, together, recorded a demo tape. Kelly then met with Warner Bros. A&R executive Michael Ostin and had him listen to the demo; Ostin, who was set to meet Madonna the next day, thought the song was "perfect" for her. Madonna "loved" the song right away, but Rodgers wasn't convinced. He felt it was "really queer", and that the line like a virgin wasn't a "terrific" hook, nor an "all-time catch phrase". Four days later, Rodgers realized that the song was still stuck in his head; "[It] grew on me. I really started to like it. [...] [I] handed [my] apology [to Madonna] and said, 'you know... if it's so catchy, it must be something. So let's do it". Written by Peter Brown and Robert Rans for another Warner Bros. singer, "Material Girl" was also presented to Madonna by Ostin.

Ostin also suggested that the singer covered Rose Royce's "Love Don't Live Here Anymore" (1978). He was driving into work and heard the song on the radio; "I called [Nile and Madonna], they were in the studio. I said, 'I have an idea. You know the old Rose Royce record, 'Love Don't Live Here Anymore'? Why don't you try and record a version of it?". Both Rodgers and Madonna were reluctant, but ultimately decided that a ballad could be a good move to bring "diversity" to the album. The final song to be created for Like a Virgin was "Dress You Up". Rodgers had previously asked songwriters Andrea LaRusso and Peggy Stanziale to write a song for Madonna in the style of Chic but, due to other projects, the composition took time. When the lyrics of the song were submitted, Rodgers turned them down as he felt there was no time to compose a melody and record it for the album; however, Madonna liked them and persuaded the producer to include the track.

"Into the Groove" was written and produced by Madonna and Stephen Bray, and recorded at Sigma Sound Studios. Inspired by the dance floor and a Puerto Rican boy the singer was attracted to, it was used on the Susan Seidelman-directed film Desperately Seeking Susan, in which Madonna starred. The song was originally written for Cheyne, the fifteen-year-old protégée of Mark Kamins, the man who discovered Madonna's debut single "Everybody" (1982) and took her to Sire Records. Madonna then decided to record the track herself and use it on Desperately Seeking Susan, much to Kamins' dismay.

== Recording ==
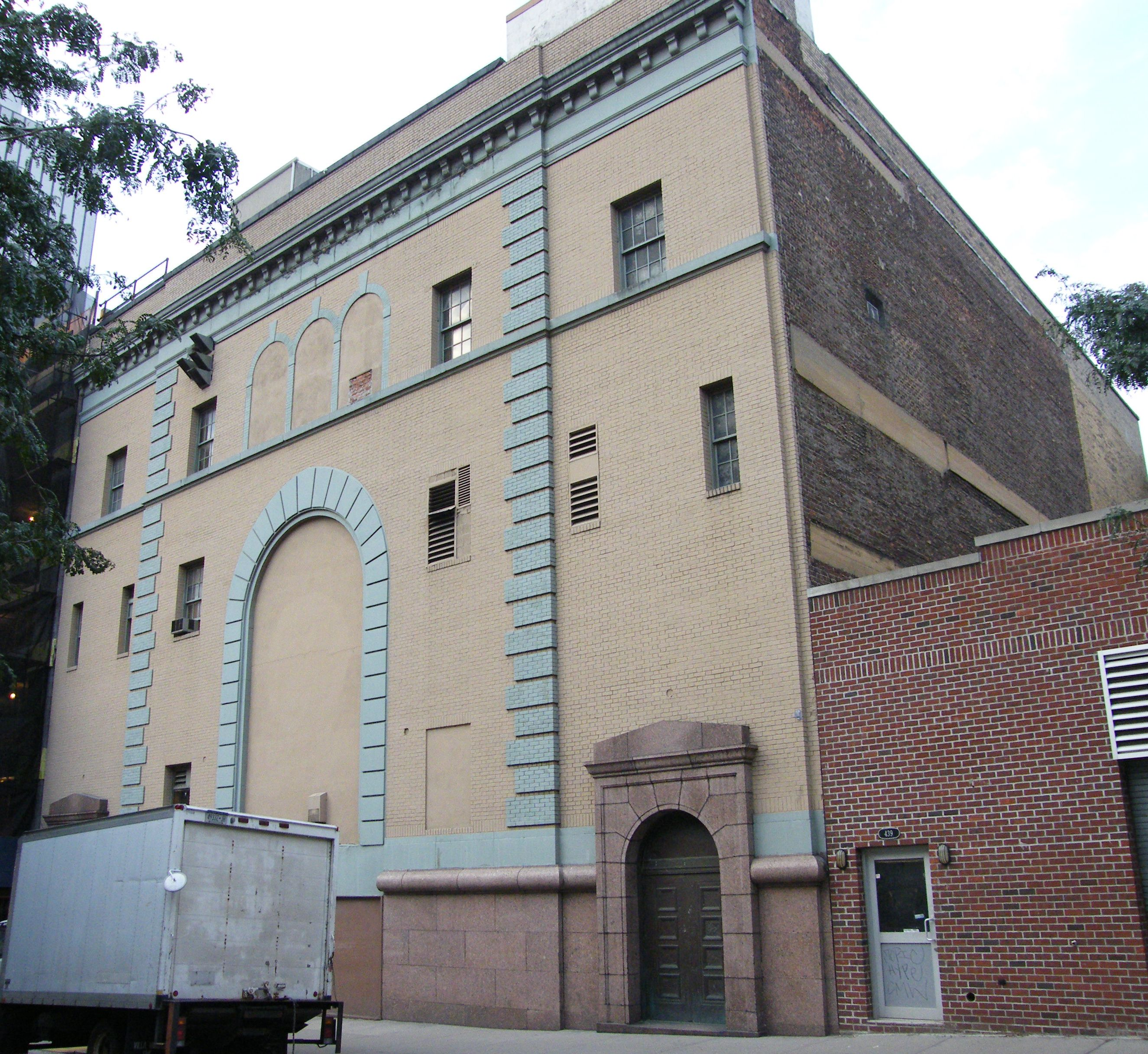
Power Station studios, where recording sessions for Like a Virgin took place.

Recording sessions took place at New York's Power Station studios in April 1984. Rodgers envisioned a "simpler set-up" and, after hearing Madonna's demos, came to the conclusion they were too similar to what she had done on her debut: Heavily sequenced and synthesizer-led. He decided that the singer needed a "more streetwise sound", and to record with a live band. Rodgers subsequently assembled a rhythm section consisting of himself on guitar, Chic colleagues Bernard Edwards and Tony Thompson on bass and drums, respectively. Sessions took place in the afternoon, as Rodgers would attend late-night parties and wasn't used to working in the morning. It was Jason Corsaro, the album's audio engineer, who persuaded the producer to use digital recording, a new technique he believed was going to be the "future" of recording. He brought in a Sony 3324 24-track digital tape recorder and a Sony F1 two-track, which were used for the mixing.

Madonna's vocals were recorded at the studio's small, wooden, high-ceilinged piano room at the back. Corsaro would place gobos around her while using the top capsule of a stereo AKG C24 tube microphone, with a Schoeps microphone preamplifier and a Pultec equalizer. "That was part of the Power Station way" — recalled Corsaro — "nothing was subtle and everything had a particular sound". Once the tracks met with everybody's approval, Robert Sabino added the keyboard parts; he did this by playing a Sequential Circuits Prophet-5, as well as some Rhodes and acoustic piano. Rodgers also played the Synclavier on this part. Corsaro remembered that the final songs "adhered very closely" to the Bray-produced demos, which were "quite simple in structure. All we did was get better musicians". Madonna, although not required, was present every minute of the recording and mixing processes; Corsaro commented: "Nile was there most of the time, but she was there all of the time. She never left". After hearing the album, Madonna's then manager Freddy DeMann pressured her to "put a little more bass on it", and make it sound like Michael Jackson's Thriller (1982). All the singer did was write the words "Bass Up" on the record's box without altering a thing.

== Composition ==
Alexis Petridis from The Guardian described Like a Virgin as a "cocktail of post-disco dance music, with a dash of hip-hop and a surprisingly large shot of choppy, angular new wave rock". Nicole Horning, author of Pop Music: Chart-Toppers Throughout History, categorized it as a dance-pop album in a style of new wave, which melded disco, rock, sixties pop, and synthesizer-based electronic music. Noted as an "80s teen-pop" take on Marilyn Monroe's "Diamonds Are a Girl's Best Friend", opener "Material Girl" is a synth-pop song with disco and new wave elements. A tongue-in-cheek satire on the superficiality and materialism of the 1980s, Madonna sings in a shrill voice about how she won't accept men who cannot provide her with wealth and luxuries, because "we are living in a material world". Throughout the song, a robotic male voice repeats the hook "living in a material world". The second track, "Angel", begins with the sound of twinkling synths and giggles. It is an "ode to heavenly love" with a new wave overtone, built on an ascending hook consisting of a three chord sequence, which serves for the verse and refrain. One of the lyrics is taken from Public Image Ltd's "Death Disco" (1979), while Rodgers provides pizzicato guitars.

The title track, "Like a Virgin", is a "mildly titillating" dance-rock song, in which the singer talks about how true love can make a girl feel "shiny and new". The bass-line on the introduction is a reworking of the Four Tops' "I Can't Help Myself (Sugar Pie Honey Bunch)" (1965). Madonna sings in a "little girl lost" voice the opening line "I made it through the wilderness / Somehow, I made it through / Didn't know how lost I was until I found you". The drums, played by Tony Thompson, give the track "far more wallop than a drum machine ever could", according to Rikky Rooksby, author of The Complete Guide to the Music of Madonna. The lyrics to the fourth track, "Over and Over", talk about determination and picking oneself up from disappointments; "I get up again, over and over", Madonna sings in the refrain. Instrumentation and production are sparse, featuring only a "silky" guitar.

"Dress You Up"
The last track to be added to the album, the refrain to "Dress You Up" has Madonna singing the phrase "Gonna dress you up in my love / All over / All over".

"Love Don't Live Here Anymore" is the only ballad on the album, as well as the most soulful. The song echoes back to Philadelphia soul, and features acoustic guitar and synth strings on the first half. Lyrically, it is about a woman being abandoned and "emptied of love". Madonna sings in a "tearful, angsty" tone as the track "builds and the strings undulate, belting that last anymore until she's literally panting for breath". Included only on the 1985 international re-issue of Like a Virgin, Madonna's voice in "Into the Groove" is double-tracked. The track has a "bumping" synth-bass line, while the lyrics celebrate "dancefloor escapism", and juxtapose music, dance, sex and love. "Dress You Up" is a "drum machine-driven" dance song with a nu-disco beat, consisting of a two-chord verse. It features a guitar solo on its bridge, while Madonna sings about clothes she would like to drape over her lover, so that she can cover him with "velvet kisses", and caress his body with her hands.

The seventh track, "Shoo-Bee-Doo", begins as a stripped-down piano ballad, before turning into a "deceptively bouncy ditty". The song is reminiscent of doo-wop and girl groups like the Shirelles and the Ronettes, while the lyrics deal with relationship problems, and Madonna trying to get through to her confused lover. Starting with the refrain followed by an opening verse, the eighth track "Pretender" is a synth-pop song about seduction and the insecurity felt by Madonna as she lets things happen too fast with a man who isn't what he seems. Like a Virgin closes with "Stay", a song that features a fast triple rhythm with synths. The hook consists of the phrase "stay, darling" being repeated over and over. Also present is the noise of someone slapping a microphone and a spoken sequence toward the end.

== Artwork and release ==
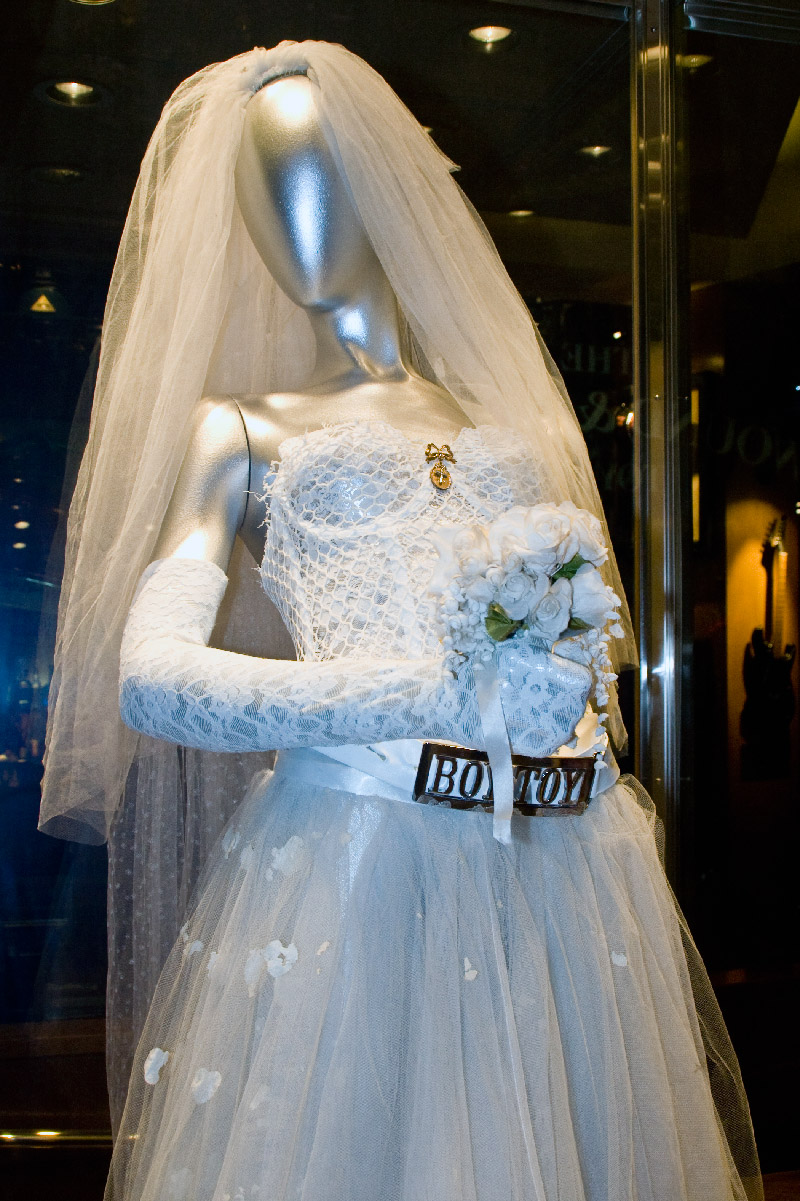
The wedding dress worn by Madonna on the album's cover, featuring the "Boy Toy" belt buckle.

Like a Virgin takes its name after the eponymous song. Madonna herself found the phrase "ironic and provocative [...] how can you be like a virgin? I liked the play on words". Author Graham Thompson felt that the title makes a "provocative link" between the singer's own religious name—Madonna as the Catholic title for Jesus' mother Mary—and the Christian concept of the virgin birth. The artwork for Like a Virgin was shot by Steven Meisel at a suite in the St. Regis New York. The sepia-tinted cover shows the singer lying on a satin bed, decked out in a wedding dress, with a tight-fitting bustier, full-length gloves, and a belt buckle that reads "Boy Toy"; she stares directly at the camera with heavy makeup and messy hair.

Stylist and designer Maripol described the singer's look as that of a "bride of Satan". Matthew Rettenmund, author of Encyclopedia Madonnica, wrote: "[The cover] effectively communicates the conflicted views of what a wedding dress should represent (virginity), and what [...] it does represent (sexual knowingness). Thompson added that the artwork shows the singer, "not just as an object of desire, but also as a desiring female subject". Colombian music journalist Manolo Bellon pointed out that in the cover, Madonna plays a character for the first time: She portrays a "virgin who doesn't want to be [one]". The singer herself referred to the photograph as a "statement of independence, if you wanna be a virgin, you are welcome. But if you wanna be a whore, it's your fucking right to be so". From Billboard, Joe Lynch named it Madonna's second best album cover.

Although it was completed by the beginning of May, the release of Like a Virgin was held back due to the success of "Borderline" and the continuing sales of Madonna's first album, which at that point exceeded one million copies in the United States. Rodgers himself recalled: "We finished [Like a Virgin], but Madonna (the album) was still the focus [...] then 'Borderline' hit out of the clear blue sky. We didn't expect that". On June 30, 1984, Brian Chin from Billboard announced that the album would be released the following month. On October 6, the release date was reported as October 29. Like a Virgin was officially released on November 12, 1984. In August 1985, it was reissued outside North America with the additional track "Into the Groove", which at the time had sold over a million copies and reached number one in the UK. On May 22, 2001, Warner Bros. released a remastered edition of Like a Virgin with additional remixes of the title track and "Material Girl", but without "Into the Groove". It was reissued on clear vinyl on November 8, 2019.

== Promotion ==
=== Live performances and tour ===
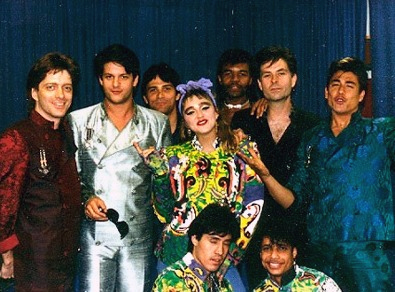
Backstage picture of Madonna and her entourage during the Virgin Tour.

On May 16, 1984, after recording was complete, Madonna sang "Like a Virgin" and "Dress You Up" at a party hosted by artist Keith Haring at New York's Paradise Garage. Four months later, on September 14, Madonna opened the inaugural MTV Video Music Awards ceremony with a performance of "Like a Virgin". She emerged from a 17-foot wedding cake donning the same wedding dress from the album cover. During the number, she slithered and writhed across the floor, with her dress going up and her underpants showing. The singer explained that this was not intentional, as one of her shoes had come off at the beginning and she had simply tried to reach for it; "I thought, 'Well, I'll just pretend I meant to do this', and I dove on the floor and I rolled around", she later recalled. MTV's Jessie Peterson opined that the performance put Madonna "on the map as Queen of Pop Music", and established the VMAs as "the place where water-cooler moments happen". It was named one of the best performances in the show's history by Slant Magazine and Billboard. On December 13, Madonna sang "Like a Virgin" on British television program Top of the Pops, decked out in a pink wig and golden metallic jacket. It was named the second-best performance in the show's history.

Like a Virgin was further promoted on the Virgin Tour, Madonna's first concert tour, which visited cities in the US and Canada from April through June 1985. The tour received mixed critical reviews but was a commercial success, with Billboard reporting a gross of $3.3 million ($9.88 million in 2025 dollars); all 17,672 tickets for the concert at New York City's Radio City Music Hall sold out in a record-breaking 34 minutes. One of the Detroit concerts was filmed and released on VHS as Madonna Live: The Virgin Tour.

=== Singles ===
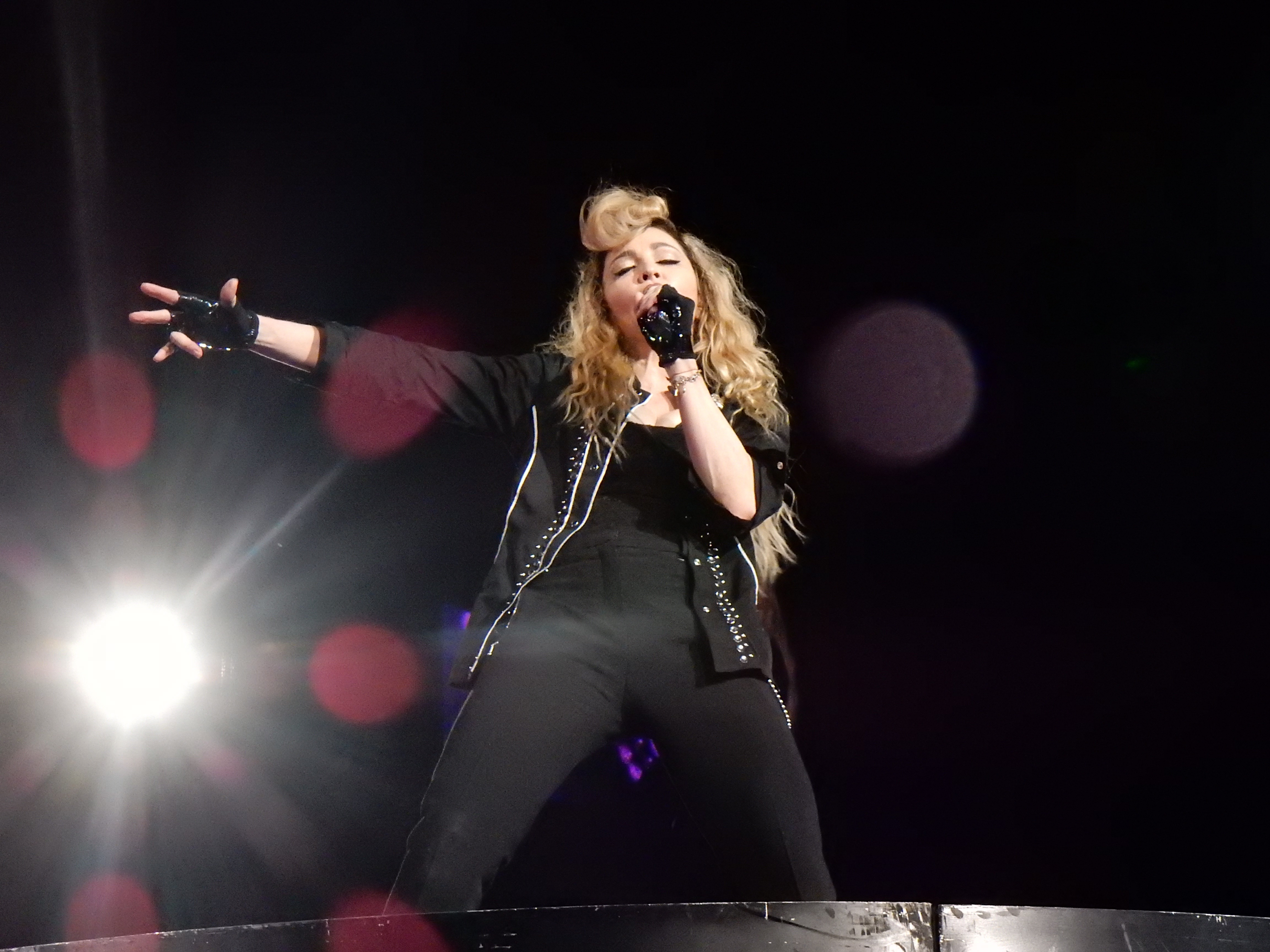
Madonna performing title track "Like a Virgin" on the Rebel Heart Tour (2015–2016). The song became her first number-one single on the Billboard Hot 100.

In the United States, the title track, "Like a Virgin," was released as the lead single on October 31, 1984. In most European countries, it was issued on November 11. Upon release, it received generally positive reviews from critics, who singled out Madonna's vocals and deemed it her first signature song. Additionally, it became her first number-one single on the Billboard Hot 100. The accompanying music video was directed by Mary Lambert, and shows the singer sailing down the canals of Venice in a gondola, and roaming around a castle in a white wedding dress.

Second single "Material Girl" was first released in the US on November 30, whereas in Europe it was published on February 18, 1985. AllMusic's Stephen Thomas Erlewine deemed it one of the songs that made Madonna an icon, along with "Like a Virgin". Commercially, it was successful, reaching number two on the Hot 100, and number three on the UK Singles Chart. The music video, also directed by Lambert, is a homage to Marilyn Monroe's performance of "Diamonds Are a Girl's Best Friend" from the 1953 film Gentlemen Prefer Blondes.

"Angel" was released as the third single on April 10, 1985. It received generally mixed reviews from critics, with some calling it a "classic" and others deeming it sub-par compared to the singer's previous works. "Angel" became Madonna's fifth consecutive top-five single on the Hot 100. "Into the Groove" was released in the UK on July 15. It was not released in the US; instead, it was issued as B-side to the 12-inch maxi-single of "Angel", and was therefore ineligible to enter the Billboard Hot 100. "Angel"/"Into the Groove" reached number one on the Dance Club Songs chart. Billboard readers voted "Into the Groove" the best dance single from the 1980s decade.

Final single "Dress You Up" was released on July 24, 1985. Critics reacted positively toward the track, referring to it as irresistible. Despite positive feedback, "Dress You Up" was added to the Parents Music Resource Center's "Filthy Fifteen" list due to perceived sexual innuendo in its lyrics. It fared well commercially, reaching number five on both the Hot 100 and the UK Singles Chart. A promotional two-sided 7-inch single of "Love Don't Live Here Anymore" and "Over and Over" was released in Japan in March 1986.

=== Video compilation ===
A VHS video compilation titled Madonna was made available in December 1984; it included the videos for "Borderline", "Burning Up", "Like a Virgin", and an extended mix of "Lucky Star". The release topped Billboard's Music Videocassette chart from April 13 to November 9, 1985, and was the year's best-selling music videocassette. Additionally, Madonna was certified platinum by the Recording Industry Association of America (RIAA) for shipments of 100,000 units, and was recognized as the "Best Selling Video Cassette Merchandised as Music Video" by the National Association of Recording Merchandisers. According to The Saturday Evening Post, the video has sold over one million copies. To promote the release, a party was held at Chicago's Cabaret Metro on February 9, 1985. Dubbed "The Virgin Party", it drew a crowd of around 1,200 people; attendees were encouraged to wear white, and for $5 admission, were able to view the Madonna videocassette and the "Material Girl" music video. The event was organized as a drive to promote music videos, which at that point did not have a large market share.

== Critical reception ==
Professional reviews
Review scores
Source	Rating
Blender	3/5 stars
Classic Pop	4/5 stars
Christgau's Record Guide	B
Entertainment Weekly	A
Q	4/5 stars
Rolling Stone	3.5/5 stars
Slant Magazine	3.5/5 stars

Music guides
Review scores
Source	Rating
AllMusic	4.5/5 stars
MusicHound Rock	4/5 stars
The Rolling Stone Album Guide	3/5 stars
Spin Alternative Record Guide	9/10
Tom Hull – on the Web	B+ (**)
The Virgin Encyclopedia of Nineties Music	3/5 stars

Reviews of Like a Virgin were mixed upon release. From Billboard, Brian Chine called it a "fine" second album, even though Madonna "does no searching whatsoever in her singing [...] [She] hits her notes straight on, and with a pretty enough melody". Also from Billboard, Michael Paoletta praised Rodgers' "sleek but snewy rhythm arrangements". From The New York Times, Stephen Holden was pleased with the "handsomely produced" record and the singer's voice, which he felt echoed the "rock-and-roll girl-group tradition that preceded the Beatles", but while these "worshipfully extolled their boyfriends' cars, haircuts and rebel poses, Madonna's point of view is decidedly more self-interested". "The words 'shiny and new' describe not only the way the love-smitten singer feels in the title song but the sound of the album", concluded Holden. Debby Miller from Rolling Stone opined that, "[d]espite [Madonna's] little-girl voice, there's an undercurrent of ambition that makes her more than the latest Betty Boop [...] Her light voice bobs over the heavy rhythm and synth tracks like a kid on a carnival ride". Author J. Randy Taraborrelli applauded Madonna's voice for being "reflectively sharper" than on her debut, and felt Like a Virgin reflected her as a "more versatile and artistic performer". From streaming service Tidal, John Murph described the album as "far warmer, fuller and more soulful than the often cold and tinny synth sounds that typified a lot of underground dance music" of the time.

The album was described as "smart, funny, sexy and irresistible" by Q magazine, while for The National's Saeed Saeed, it is a "ruthlessly focused collection of pop songs [...] featuring at least three pop classics". Alexis Petridis referred to Like a Virgin as "provocative, fun, [and] witty [...] [It's also] the last album on which Madonna sounded like a product of the environment that birthed her". It was deemed a "masterpiece" by Joseph Earp from Australian website Junkee. WhatCulture's Reece Shrewsbury felt the songs on Like a Virgin are stronger than those on Madonna. To Matthew Rettenmund, "[Like a Virgin] is not Madonna's strongest album, but its nine tracks feature [her] at her least self-conscious and most cleverly effervescent". Daryl Easlea praised Rodgers' production, but felt the album "tapers off, veering toward filler" on its second half. Despite being home to some of the "catchiest, not to mention most iconic tracks in pop music", Like a Virgin is made up of "mostly fillers", according to the staff of Instinct magazine.

Pete Bishop from The Pittsburgh Press wrote that in Like a Virgin, Madonna "sort of hum-de-dums her way through [...] a lot of simple love lyrics over a lot of lightweight, pop-style fun-rock [...] sometimes sounding like a one-woman Pointer Sisters and sometimes like Cyndi Lauper with her nose pinched shut". Despite naming it "pleasant enough", Bishop concluded that its main "weakness" is that, "you could put these [songs] behind any decent-voiced singer. Like a Virgin does not establish Madonna as anything special". Taraborrelli added that, when compared to Madonna's subsequent records, Like a Virgin "does come across as a bit repetitious and immature". Both Sal Cinquemani from Slant Magazine and Stephen Thomas Erlewine felt it is not as "innovative" as Madonna's first record, with the former adding: "[On the first album], she stunned with style and a certain joy. Here, the calculation is apparent, and while that's part of [her] essence - even something that makes her fun - it throws [Like a Virgin]'s balance off a little too much for it to be consistent". This sentiment was echoed by Sam Damshenas and Daniel Megarry from Gay Times, who wrote that, like Madonna, Like a Virgin lacks the innovation of the singer's posterior works. The staff of The Advocate concluded that, "this could have been the best EP of the '80s, with generation-defining songs [...] Instead it was a nine-song album with five great singles and four tracks that unbelievably escaped the cutting room floor". In the same vein, Erlewine added that the singles "overshadow" the rest of the album, which "vacillates wildly in terms of quality". To Michael Paoletta from Billboard, Like a Virgin hasn't aged as well as the singer's other works from the 1980s decade. People magazine dismissed the record as a "tolerable bit of fluff" with "primitive" lyrics.

== Commercial performance ==
In the United States, Like a Virgin debuted at number 70 on the Billboard 200 on December 1, 1984. The following week, it climbed to number ten. The album reached the chart's first spot on February 9, 1985, where it spent three weeks. Madonna became the third female artist in the 1980s decade ―after Barbra Streisand and Kim Carnes― to score both a number one album and single, as the title track had reached the Hot 100's top spot two weeks prior. Fourteen weeks after its release, Like a Virgin had sold over 3.5 million copies. By July 1985, it had become the first album by a female to sell over five million copies in the United States. The record came in at the third spot on the Billboard 200 year-end chart for 1985. It was eventually certified ten times platinum (diamond) by the Recording Industry Association of America (RIAA), for shipment of ten million copies. After the advent of the Nielsen SoundScan era in 1991, the album sold a further 574,000 copies as of August 2010. Another 882,000 units were sold at the BMG Music Club, which are not counted by the Nielsen SoundScan. Along with True Blue (1986) and The Immaculate Collection (1990), Like a Virgin is one of Madonna's best-selling albums in the United States.

In Canada, Like a Virgin debuted at the 78th spot of the RPM Albums Chart on November 10, 1984; it climbed up the chart and eventually peaked at number three on February 16, 1985. The album spent a total of 32 consecutive weeks in the top 10, with nine of those weeks spent at number three. The album was present for a total of 74 weeks on the chart, and was certified diamond by the Canadian Recording Industry Association (CRIA), for shipment of one million copies. Like a Virgin reached the fifth position of RPM's 1985 year-end chart. 750,000 copies were sold in Latin America as of June 1986.

In the United Kingdom, Like a Virgin debuted at number 74 on the UK Albums Chart, on November 24, 1984. However, it fluctuated on the chart for the next eight months and it wasn't until September that it finally reached the chart's top. The album was certified three times platinum by the British Phonographic Industry (BPI) and has sold over a million copies there. In France, the album debuted and peaked at number five on the French Albums Chart on October 6, 1985, staying there for eight weeks. Like a Virgin was certified two times platinum by the Syndicat National de l'Édition Phonographique (SNEP) for shipment of 600,000 copies. Like a Virgin reached number the first place on European countries like Germany, the Netherlands, Spain, and Italy. Like a Virgin became Madonna's first number-one album on the European Top 100 Albums, reaching the summit on November 18, 1985, and remaining there for two weeks. Over 2 million copies were sold across Europe by the end of 1985.

In Australia, the album debuted and peaked at the second position of the Kent Music Report albums chart, and was certified seven times platinum by the Australian Recording Industry Association (ARIA) for shipment of 490,000 copies. Like a Virgin remained at the top of the New Zealand Albums Chart for three consecutive weeks, and was certified five times platinum by the Recording Industry Association of New Zealand (RIANZ) for the shipping of 75,000 copies. With over 21 million copies sold worldwide, Like a Virgin is one of the best-selling albums of all time.

== Accolades ==
Awards and nominations
Organization	Year	Category	Result	Ref.
American Music Awards	1986	Favorite Pop/Rock Album	Nominated	
Cash Box Year-End Awards	1985	Pop Albums Awards	2nd place	
Cash Box Year-End Awards	1985	Compact Disc Awards	3rd place	
Cash Box Year-End Awards	1985	Black Contemporary Albums Awards	50th place	
Juno Awards	1985	International Album of the Year	Nominated	
NARM Best Seller Awards	1985	Best-Selling Album by a Female Artist	Won	
Record Mirror Readers Poll	1985	Favorite Album	3rd place	
Record Mirror Readers Poll	1985	Most Tasteful Album Sleeve	2nd place	
Smash Hits Poll Winners Party	1985	Best LP	Won	

== Legacy ==
Like a Virgin has been referred to as the album that made Madonna a superstar. Stephen Thomas Erlewine wrote: "Madonna had hits with her first album [...] but she didn't become an icon, until Like a Virgin". Similarly, Sam Damshenas and Daniel Megarry referred to the album as the one that cemented the singer as a "force to be reckoned with in the world of pop". This opinion was shared by John Murph, who added that Like a Virgin allowed Madonna to "create an archetype of pop stardom that the likes of Gwen Stefani, P!nk and Lady Gaga have followed". To Daniel Garrán from Spanish radio station Los 40, "[Like a Virgin] proved [Madonna] was not a one-hit wonder but a versatile artist capable of cementing her place in the music world [...] pop culture gave in to her charms".

Stephen Holden wrote: "No phenomenon illustrates more pointedly how pop music history seems to run in cycles than the overnight success of Madonna. The month before Christmas [...] Teen-agers were lining up in stores to purchase [Like a Virgin] the way their parents had lined up to buy Beatles records in the late 60's". With the album, the singer was able to take charge of her career, according to the staff of Rhino Entertainment. Chris Smith, author of 101 Albums That Changed Popular Music, where Like a Virgin was included, added that it helped Madonna "steal the spotlight toward herself. [Asserting] her sexuality as only male rock stars had done before, moving well beyond the limited confines of being a pop artist, to becoming a focal point for nationwide discussions of power relationships in the areas of sex, race, gender, religion, and other divisive social topics". For The Guardian's Caroline Sullivan, Madonna became the "biggest thing to hit pop" since "a woman in control of her sex life and career was such a new idea".

"[Like a Virgin] defined Madonna as the seminal 1980s pop star, as she symbolically entered the culture war debates of the 1980s (sex, feminism, and career women) and helped change a generation of young girls into sexually expressive adults, and alerted woman to the dated ideologies of religion and gender norms".

— Out magazine's Nathan Smith commenting on Like a Virgin and its impact.

According to Santiago Fouz-Hernandez, one of the authors of Madonna's Drowned Worlds, following the album's release and Virgin tour, young girls everywhere started emulating Madonna's style. The singer herself recalled that women would show up to the concerts with "flap skirts on and tights cut off below their knees and lace gloves and rosaries and bows in their hair and big hoop earrings. I was like, 'This is insane!'" Madonna look-alike contests were held in shopping malls across the United States; artist Andy Warhol served as judge at one in New York City. Nathan Smith from Out magazine wrote that young women idolized the "transformative transgressions of Madonna, a star who wanted to be in control of sexual identity and dictate the terms of her own erotic encounters". Smith ultimately concluded that, "[Like a Virgin] stands today as a polemic for the reborn woman of the 1980s: empowered, sexually demonstrative, financially independent, and drawing on old antiquated traditions to move ahead in the world". Sal Cinquemani placed the record among the "most definitive pop artifacts from the indulgent Reagan Era".

Like a Virgin is considered one of the best albums of 1984 and of the 1980s decade. In 2017, NPR named Like a Virgin one of the greatest albums ever made by a woman, with Alison Fensterstock writing: "All that came with [the album], made it clear that there would never be a pop music landscape without the impact and influence of Madonna again". Consequence of Sound considered Like a Virgin the second best sophomore album of all time, with Michael Roffman saying it "carved out the throne, the crown, and the title that would be Madonna's forever: The Queen of Pop". Chuck Arnold, writing for Billboard, concluded that, "Madonna has definitely made better albums than Like a Virgin — among them, Like a Prayer [and] Ray of Light — but her second LP changed the course of pop history". According to Taraborrelli, "every important artist has at least one album in his or her career whose critical and commercial success becomes the artist's magic moment; for Madonna, Like a Virgin was just such a defining moment". Finally, in 2023, Like a Virgin was selected for preservation in the United States' National Recording Registry by the Library of Congress due to it being considered "culturally, historically, or aesthetically significant".

== Track listing ==
All tracks are written by Madonna and Stephen Bray, except where noted. All tracks are produced by Nile Rodgers, except where noted.

Side one
No.	Title	Writer(s)	Length
1.	"Material Girl"	Peter Brown; Robert Rans	4:01
2.	"Angel"		3:56
3.	"Like a Virgin"	Thomas Kelly; William Steinberg	3:38
4.	"Over and Over"		4:12
5.	"Love Don't Live Here Anymore"	Miles Gregory	4:47
Total length:			20:34

Side two
No.	Title	Writer(s)	Length
6.	"Dress You Up"	Andrea LaRusso; Peggy Stanziale	4:01
7.	"Shoo-Bee-Doo"	Madonna	5:16
8.	"Pretender"		4:30
9.	"Stay"		4:07
Total length:			17:54 38:28

1985 European reissue side two
No.	Title	Writer(s)	Producer(s)	Length
6.	"Into the Groove"		Madonna; Bray	4:44
7.	"Dress You Up"	LaRusso; Stanziale		4:01
8.	"Shoo-Bee-Doo"	Madonna		5:16
9.	"Pretender"			4:30
10.	"Stay"			4:07
Total length:				43:10

2001 remaster bonus tracks
No.	Title	Writer(s)	Producer(s)	Length
10.	"Like a Virgin" (extended dance remix)	Kelly; Steinberg	John "Jellybean" Benitez	6:11
11.	"Material Girl" (extended dance remix)	Brown; Rans	Benitez	6:09
Total length:				50:53

== Personnel ==
Credits adapted from the album's liner notes.

- Sire Records – record label, U.S. copyright owner (1984, 1985)
- Warner Bros. Records – U.S. marketing and distributor (all releases), record label, copyright owner (2001)
- WEA International – international distributor, international copyright owner (all releases)

=== Musicians ===
- Madonna – lead vocals (all tracks), background vocals (1, 2, 7)
- Nile Rodgers – Roland Juno-60 (1), Synclavier II (1, 9), guitars (1–4, 6–9), acoustic guitar (5), electric guitar (5), string arrangements and conductor (5)
- Nathaniel S. Hardy Jr. – keyboards (1, 5)
- Robert Sabino – synthesizers (2–9), bass synthesizer (2–6, 8, 9), acoustic piano (7), Fender Rhodes piano (5)
- Bernard Edwards – bass (1, 3, 5, 7)
- Tony Thompson – drums (1, 3, 5, 7)
- Jimmy Bralower – LinnDrum and Simmons drum machine programming (2, 4, 6, 8, 9)
- Lenny Pickett – saxophone solo (7)
- Karen Milne – string contractor (5)
- Kermit Moore – string contractor (5)
- Curtis King – background vocals (1, 2, 4–9)
- Frank Simms – background vocals (1, 2, 4–9)
- George Simms – background vocals (1, 2, 4–9)
- Brenda King – background vocals (7)

=== Production ===
- Madonna – producer ("Into the Groove")
- Stephen Bray – producer ("Into the Groove")
- Nile Rodgers – producer (all tracks except "Into the Groove")
- Jason Corsaro – recording engineer (all tracks), audio mixing (all tracks)
- Rob "Ace" Eaton – second engineer (all tracks)
- Gus Skinas – digital editing
- Eric Mohler – digital editing assistant
- Malcolm Pollack – assistant engineer
- Bob Ludwig – audio mastering at Masterdisk (New York City, New York)
- Budd Tunick – production manager
- Weisner-DeMann Entertainment – management

=== Design ===
- Jeri McManus – art direction, design
- Jeffrey Kent Ayeroff – art direction, design
- Steven Meisel – photography
- Maripol – stylist

== Charts ==
=== Weekly charts ===
Weekly chart performance
Chart (1984–1985)	Peak position
Australian Albums (ARIA)	2
Austrian Albums (Ö3 Austria)	3
Brazilian Albums (Nopem/ABPD)	2
Canada Top Albums/CDs (RPM)	3
Dutch Albums (Album Top 100)	1
European Albums (Eurotipsheet)	1
Finnish Albums (Suomen virallinen lista)	8
French Albums (SNEP)	5
German Albums (Offizielle Top 100)	1
Icelandic Albums (Tónlist)	1
Italian Albums (Musica e dischi)	1
Japanese Albums (Oricon)	2
New Zealand Albums (RMNZ)	1
Norwegian Albums (VG-lista)	6
Spanish Albums (AFYVE)	1
Swedish Albums (Sverigetopplistan)	3
Swiss Albums (Schweizer Hitparade)	3
UK Albums (Official Charts)	1
UK Dance Albums (Music Week)	1
US Billboard 200	1
US Top R&B/Hip-Hop Albums (Billboard)	10
US Top 100 Albums (Cash Box)	3

Weekly chart performance
Chart (2006–2019)	Peak position
Croatian International Albums (HDU)	6
Hungarian Albums (MAHASZ)	25
Danish Albums (Hitlisten)	22
Italian Albums (FIMI)	96
Scottish Albums (Official Charts)	61
Spanish Albums (Promusicae)	50
US Top Catalog Albums (Billboard)	11

Weekly chart performance
Chart (2026)	Peak position
Japanese Top Albums Sales (Billboard Japan)	75

=== Monthly charts ===
Monthly chart performance
Chart (2019)	Peak position
Croatian International Albums (HDU)	9

=== Year-end charts ===
Year-end chart performance
Chart (1984)	Position
US Top 100 Albums (Cash Box)	53

Year-end chart performance
Chart (1985)	Position
Australian Albums (Kent Music Report)	3
Austrian Albums (Ö3 Austria)	9
Canadian Albums (RPM)	6
Dutch Albums (Album Top 100)	2
European Albums (Eurotipsheet)	3
French Albums (SNEP)	8
German Albums (Offizielle Top 100)	4
Italian Albums (Musica e dischi)	7
New Zealand Albums (RMNZ)	2
Norwegian Summer Period (VG-lista)	18
Spanish Albums (PROMUSICAE)	16
Swiss Albums (Schweizer Hitparade)	8
UK Albums (OCC)	3
US Billboard 200	3
US Top R&B/Hip-Hop Albums (Billboard)	30
US Top 100 Albums (Cash Box)	2

Year-end chart performance
Chart (1986)	Position
Brazil (Nopem)	5
Dutch Albums (Album Top 100)	11
European Albums (Eurotipsheet)	11
Spanish Albums (PROMUSICAE)	16
UK Albums (OCC)	28
US Billboard 200	52

=== Decade-end charts ===
1980–1989 decade-end chart performance for Like a Virgin
Chart (1980–1989)	Position
Australian Albums (Kent Music Report)	18
Japanese Albums (Oricon)	33

=== All-time chart ===
All-time chart performance
Chart (1958–2018)	Position
US Billboard 200 (Women)	65

== Certifications and sales ==
Certifications and available sales for Like a Virgin
Region	Certification	Certified units/sales
Argentina	—	160,000
Australia (ARIA)	7× Platinum	490,000^{^}
Belgium (BRMA)	Platinum	75,000
Brazil	—	715,000
Canada (Music Canada)	Diamond	1,000,000^{^}
Finland (Musiikkituottajat)	Gold	35,398
France (SNEP)	2× Platinum	600,000^{*}
Germany (BVMI)	3× Gold	750,000^{^}
Hong Kong (IFPI Hong Kong)	2× Platinum	40,000
Israel	—	30,000
Italy (AFI)	2× Platinum	1,000,000 (Note: In Italy, Like a Virgin received a platinum award for the sales of 500,000 copies in 1986. The following year, it received an additional platinum with the same level-requeriments (making a total of 1 million certified units) despite that for new releases, a platinum was equivalent to 200,000 copies at that time.)
Japan (RIAJ)	Gold	1,000,000^{^}
New Zealand (RMNZ)	5× Platinum	75,000^{^}
Norway	—	100,000
Spain (Promusicae)	Platinum	100,000^{^}
Switzerland (IFPI Switzerland)	2× Platinum	100,000^{^}
Taiwan	—	10,000
United Kingdom (BPI)	3× Platinum	1,000,000
United States (RIAA)	Diamond	10,000,000^{^}
Summaries
Europe Sales as of December 1985	—	2,000,000
Latin America Sales as of 1986	—	750,000
Worldwide	—	21,000,000
^{*} Sales figures based on certification alone.^{^} Shipments figures based on certification alone.

Certifications for Madonna (video)
Region	Certification	Certified units/sales
Australia (ARIA)	Gold	7,500^{^}
United States (RIAA)	Platinum	100,000^{^}
Summaries
Worldwide	—	1,000,000
^{^} Shipments figures based on certification alone.

== See also ==
- List of best-selling albums
- List of best-selling albums by women
- List of best-selling albums in Brazil
- List of best-selling albums in Italy
- List of best-selling albums in the United States
- List of best-selling albums of the 1980s in the United Kingdom
- List of albums which have spent the most weeks on the UK Albums Chart
- List of Australian chart achievements and milestones
- List of diamond-certified albums in Canada
- List of European number-one hits of 1985
- List of UK Albums Chart number ones of the 1980s
- List of number-one albums of 1985 (U.S.)
- List of number-one hits of 1985 (Germany)

== Bibliography ==
- Bego, Mark (2000). Madonna: Blonde Ambition. Rowman & Littlefield. ISBN 978-0-8154-1051-5.
- Bellon, Manolo (2011). El ABC del Rock (in Spanish). Penguin Random House Grupo Editorial Colombia. ISBN 9789587581287.
- Bronson, Fred (2003). Billboard's Hottest Hot 100 Hits. Crown Publishing Group. ISBN 0-8230-7738-1.
- Claro, Nicole (2000). Madonna. Chelsea House Publishers. ISBN 9780791023303.
- Cresswell, Toby (2006). 1001 Songs: The Great Songs of All Time and the Artists, Stories and Secrets Behind Them. Thunder's Mouth Press. ISBN 1560259159.
- Easlea, Daryl (2012). Madonna: Blond Ambition. Backbeat Books. ISBN 9781617130342.
- Fouz-Hernández, Santiago; Jarman-Ivens, Freeya (2004). Madonna's Drowned Worlds. Ashgate Publishing, Ltd. ISBN 0-7546-3372-1.
- Guilbert, Georges-Claude (2002). Madonna as Postmodern Myth. McFarland. ISBN 0-7864-1408-1.
- Grayer Moore, Jennifer (2015). Fashion Fads Through American History. ABC-Clio. ISBN 9781610699020.
- Kallen, Stuart A. (2012). The History of American Pop. Greenhaven Publishing. ISBN 9781420509731.
- Metz, Allen; Benson, Carol (1999). The Madonna Companion: Two Decades of Commentary. Music Sales Group. ISBN 978-0-8256-7194-4.
- Morton, Andrew (2001). Madonna. St. Martin's Press. ISBN 0-312-28786-0.
- Rettenmund, Matthew (1995). Encyclopedia Madonnica. St. Martin's Press. ISBN 0-312-11782-5.
- Rooksby, Rikky (2004). The Complete Guide to the Music of Madonna. Omnibus Press. ISBN 0-7119-9883-3.
- Rosen, Craig (1996). The Billboard Book of Number One Albums. Billboard Books. ISBN 978-0-8230-7586-7.
- Simpson, Jeff (2002). Top of the Pops: 1964-2002. BBC Worldwide. ISBN 9780563534761.
- Smith, Chris (2009). 101 Albums That Changed Popular Music. Oxford University Press. ISBN 978-0-19-537371-4.
- Taraborrelli, Randy J. (2002). Madonna: An Intimate Biography. Simon & Schuster. ISBN 0-7432-2880-4.
- Taraborrelli, Randy J. (2018). Madonna: An Intimate Biography of an Icon at Sixty. Macmillan Publishers. ISBN 978-1509842797.
- Tawa, Nicholas E. (2005). Supremely American. Scarecrow Press. ISBN 0-8108-5295-0.
- Thompson, Graham (2007). American culture in the 1980s. Oxford University Press. ISBN 978-0-7486-1910-8.
- Zanes, Warren (2009). Revolutions in Sound: Warner Bros. Records The First Fifty Years. Chronicle Books. ISBN 978-0-8118-6628-6.
