= Borderline (Madonna song) =

1984 single by Madonna

- US seven-inch single picture sleeve

Single by Madonna

from the album Madonna
- B-side: "Think of Me"; "Physical Attraction"; "Lucky Star"
- Released: February 15, 1984
- Recorded: 1983
- Studio: Sigma Sound (New York City)
- Genre: Pop
- Length: 5:18
- Label: Sire; Warner Bros.
- Songwriter: Reggie Lucas
- Producer: Reggie Lucas

Madonna singles chronology
"Lucky Star" (1983)	"Borderline" (1984)	"Like a Virgin" (1984)

Music video
- "Borderline" on YouTube

"Borderline" is a song recorded by the American singer Madonna for her 1983 self-titled debut album. Written and produced by Reggie Lucas and recorded at Sigma Sound Studios in New York City, it is a pop song with R&B influences and elements of 1970s disco and Philadelphia soul. Its lyrics portray an unequal relationship in which the narrator remains drawn to an emotionally detached partner.

Sire Records released "Borderline" as a single on February 15, 1984. It became Madonna's first top-ten hit on the US Billboard Hot 100, peaking at number 10 and beginning a run of 17 consecutive top-ten singles. Re-released in Europe in early 1986, it reached number one in Ireland and the top three in the United Kingdom, Belgium, and the Netherlands. Critics lauded its soulful quality and Madonna's vocal performance, while retrospective commentary has identified it as one of her defining early recordings.

Directed by Mary Lambert, the accompanying music video depicts Madonna caught between her Hispanic street boyfriend and a British photographer who introduces her to the fashion industry. Its interracial romance has been analyzed in relation to race, gender, identity, and the male gaze. Heavy rotation on MTV helped make Madonna widely recognizable, and the video received a nomination for Best New Artist at the inaugural MTV Video Music Awards. Madonna performed "Borderline" on her Virgin (1985) and Sticky & Sweet (2008) tours, and it has been covered by artists including Duffy, The Flaming Lips, and Kelly Clarkson.

== Background ==
By late 1980, Madonna was performing with Dan and Ed Gilroy's band Breakfast Club, first as a drummer and later as a guitarist. As her ambitions increasingly clashed with the group's dynamic, she left and reunited with former boyfriend Stephen Bray, with whom she formed the band Emmy. After securing a showcase at Max's Kansas City in 1981, they attracted the interest of Gotham Records, but negotiations collapsed when the label pushed for a rock-oriented sound while Madonna insisted on pursuing dance music. She and Bray subsequently recorded a four-track demo that included "Everybody", "Burning Up", and "Ain't No Big Deal". Madonna promoted the demo herself at local clubs, eventually bringing it to DJ and A&R executive Mark Kamins.

Impressed by "Everybody", Kamins began playing the track at Danceteria, where its enthusiastic reception on the dance floor encouraged him to help Madonna secure a recording contract. He took the demo to Sire Records president Seymour Stein, who directed him to A&R executive Michael Rosenblatt. Rosenblatt signed Madonna to Sire shortly thereafter, with Stein later formalizing the agreement from his hospital bed while recovering from heart surgery. "Everybody" was released as Madonna's debut single on October 6, 1982. Following its success, Sire greenlit a full-length album.

Although Kamins expected to produce, Sire instead hired Warner Bros. producer Reggie Lucas. Rosenblatt explained that Madonna needed a producer with greater experience developing vocal performances, and "[Mark's] strength was grooves"; he also felt Lucas, who had recently worked with Stephanie Mills and Roberta Flack, could bring an "R&B feel" to Madonna's dance-oriented material. Lucas later recalled that he was initially unimpressed by Madonna's "boho-punk style", believing she "didn't seem particularly avant-garde". As the album lacked sufficient original material, Lucas wrote two songs specifically for Madonna, "Physical Attraction" and "Borderline", after studying her demo recordings and live performances. He developed the latter with the singer while she was apartment-sitting for artist Jean-Michel Basquiat.

== Composition and release ==
"Borderline"
Audio sample of the opening verse, illustrating the song's slower tempo, R&B-influenced pop production, and Madonna's youthful-sounding vocal delivery.

Written and produced by Lucas, "Borderline" was recorded at the Sigma Sound Studios in New York City. Musically, it is a pop song with R&B influences. Slower in tempo than the rest of the album, it is propelled by a percolating synth-bass punctuated by colorful keyboard stabs, alongside interlocking synthesizer phrases, an electric piano introduction by Dean Gant, and Anthony Jackson's electric bass guitar. The song opens with slow, glockenspiel and vibraphone-like chords before the drums gradually enter. Lucas cited Stephanie Mills' "Never Knew Love Like This Before" (1980), which he co-wrote and co-produced, as a stylistic influence, and recalled that "Borderline" was the first recording on which he used a drum machine. Author Rikky Rooksby described it as the most "harmonically complex" track on Madonna, noting its chord inversions and influences from 1970s disco, Philadelphia soul, and mid-1970s Elton John. He also compared the verse progression to "You Ain't Seen Nothing Yet" (1974) by Bachman–Turner Overdrive.

Madonna sings in a higher register than elsewhere on the album, with her vocals mechanically altered to sound more youthful. Her performance culminates in throaty scat singing and improvised "la la la" vocalizations during the song's fade-out. Lyrically, "Borderline" has been described as a "flirty, confectionery complaint from one lover to another". Madonna expresses dissatisfaction with an unequal romantic relationship, portraying a narrator who is both demanding and submissive. She recognizes that her partner is emotionally detached yet continues to plead for his commitment through lines such as "Just try to understand/I've given all I can/'Cause you got the best of me". Slant Magazine wrote that the refrain introduces sexual innuendo through the line, "You just keep on pushing my love over the borderline".

Upon hearing the final version of "Borderline", Stein expressed strong confidence in Madonna's potential: "The passion that she put into that song, I thought, there's no stopping this girl". The song was released as a single on February 15, 1984. In the United States, it preceded "Lucky Star", which was released on August 8 of that year. In Europe, "Borderline" was re-released in February 1986 amidst "Madonna mania". The radio edit reduces the album version by nearly three minutes. "Borderline" was later included on Madonna's compilation albums The Immaculate Collection (1990) and Celebration (2009). An extended remix of the song was included on the Japan-exclusive extended play (EP) Like a Virgin & Other Big Hits!

== Critical reception and recognition ==
Critical reception to "Borderline" has been largely positive since its release. Author Daryl Easlea wrote that it demonstrated "the possibilities of Madonna's talent beyond dance music", praising its radio-friendly pop sound, her "conviction", and what he considered one of the finest vocal performances of her early career. Stewart Mason of AllMusic similarly argued that it proved Madonna was "more than a pretty face, a dancer's body and a squeaky voice", calling it a "pure treasure" and likewise identifying it as the strongest vocal performance of her early career. Critics also praised the song's soulful quality. Chuck Arnold of Entertainment Weekly wrote that Madonna "has never sounded more genuinely soulful than on the divine 'Borderline'", while Ed Masley of The Arizona Republic and Slant Magazine's Sal Cinquemani similarly highlighted the song's soulful and emotional depth. Also from Slant Magazine, Eric Henderson described the song as "tender", asking, "Has there ever been an opening refrain more winsome and instantly nostalgic?"

Other reviewers also responded favorably to the song. Ed Power of The Daily Telegraph described it as an "immediate classic", Rik Flynn of Classic Pop considered it the album's "classiest" single, and Adam Graham of The Detroit News called it a "perfectly crafted dance pop ditty". Joe Morgan of Gay Star News described it as "pure pop finery", Robert Matthew-Walker deemed it "excellent", while Dave Marsh argued that it was "too damn good to be denied". Maury Dean likewise praised its "saucy-style and come-hither magnetism". Some contemporary reviews were less enthusiastic, however. Terry Hazlett of the Observer–Reporter described the song as "inoffensive, danceable [but] ultimately forgettable", while Pete Bishop of The Pittsburgh Press and Keith Thomas of the Times Leader criticized Madonna's vocals as weak and the song as unmemorable despite its danceable beat.

Retrospective critics have frequently identified "Borderline" as one of Madonna's best recordings and emphasized its importance in her career. (Note: Attributed to multiple sources, including The A.V. Club, The Arizona Republic, Billboard, TheBacklot.com, Classic Pop, The Daily Telegraph, The Detroit News, Entertainment Weekly, Forbes, Gay Star News, Jenesaispop, NME, Parade, PinkNews, Rolling Stone, and USA Today.) Rolling Stone and Pitchfork credited the song with transforming her from an "urban-radio contender" into "the biggest pop star in the world", while The A.V. Club, HuffPost, and biographer J. Randy Taraborrelli viewed it as a defining early recording that established her signature sound and mainstream presence. People described it as a "promise of even better things to come", while Time magazine noted that although Madonna would later release "more-clever, more-showy [and] more-sexy" songs, "Borderline" best captured "the essence of her pop appeal". "Borderline" also received retrospective recognition through critics' rankings. Rolling Stone ranked it as the second-best song of 1984, Pitchfork placed it at number 106 on its list of the greatest songs of the 1980s, Blender ranked it number 84 on its list of "The 500 Greatest Songs Since You Were Born", and Billboard placed it at number 128 on its list of the 500 best pop songs of all time. It was included in Bruce Pollock's Rock Song Index: The 7500 Most Important Songs for the Rock & Roll Era.

== Chart performance ==
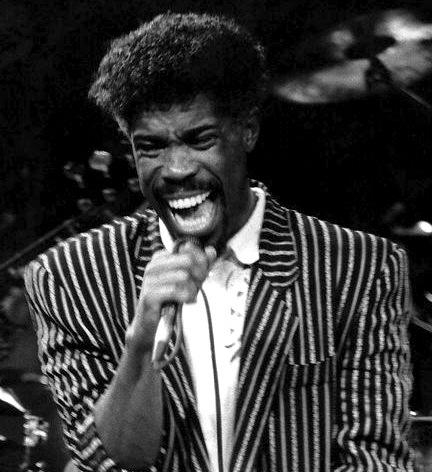
"When the Going Gets Tough, the Tough Get Going" by Billy Ocean (pictured in 1987) kept "Borderline" from reaching number one on the UK Singles Chart during its 1986 re-release.

"Borderline" debuted at number 107 on Billboard's Bubbling Under Hot 100 chart the week of March 3, 1984, following increased radio airplay. It entered the Billboard Hot 100 at number 76 the following week and reached number 10 on June 16, becoming Madonna's first top-ten single in the United States. The song spent 30 weeks on the chart, making it the singer's longest-charting Hot 100 hit until "Take a Bow" (1994), and began a streak of 17 consecutive top-ten singles that lasted through 1989. As of August 2024, Billboard ranked "Borderline" as Madonna's 21st most successful Hot 100 entry. On Billboard's Dance Club Songs chart, it debuted at number 67 on March 24 before peaking at number 4. It also reached number 23 on the Hot Adult Contemporary Tracks chart. At the end of the year, Billboard ranked "Borderline" at number 35 on its year-end Hot 100 chart.

Cash Box ranked "Borderline" slightly higher than Billboard. It debuted at number 85 on the Cash Box Top 100 on March 10, 1984, climbed to a peak of number 9, and finished the year at number 67 on the magazine's year-end chart for 1984. On October 22, 1998, the song was certified gold by the Recording Industry Association of America (RIAA) for shipments of over 500,000 copies. In Canada, the song debuted at number 56 on RPM's Top Singles chart on August 4, 1984, and peaked at number 25 six weeks later.

In its original 1984 release, "Borderline" peaked at number 56 after spending five weeks on the UK Singles Chart. Following its re-release in early 1986, it reached a new peak of number 2, held off the top spot by Billy Ocean's "When the Going Gets Tough, the Tough Get Going". The song was certified gold by the British Phonographic Industry (BPI) and finished as the UK's 50th best-selling single of 1986, with sales exceeding 298,000 copies by 2008. The reissue also performed well elsewhere in Europe, becoming Madonna's second number-one single in Ireland, and reaching the top three in Belgium and the Netherlands. It additionally peaked at number 29 on the European Hot 100 Singles and number 25 on the European Airplay Top 50. In Australia, "Borderline" peaked at number 12, while in New Zealand it had more modest success, narrowly entering the top 40.

== Music video ==
=== Background and development ===
The music video for "Borderline" was directed by Mary Lambert, marking her first collaboration with Madonna; the pair would go on to work together on the videos for "Like a Virgin" (1984), "Material Girl" (1985), "La Isla Bonita" (1987), and "Like a Prayer" (1989). Production was overseen by Bruge Logan. Lambert recalled that Warner Bros. executive Jeff Ayeroff commissioned her to direct the video after viewing her work with Tom Tom Club, believing she could help present Madonna with "a little more integrity and depth" beyond her dance-oriented image. Ayeroff then flew Lambert to New York City to meet Madonna, whom the director had never seen before and initially assumed was black after hearing her music.

The two spent several days developing the video's concept, with Madonna proposing a storyline centered on a romance with a Hispanic man from the city's street scene and taking an active role in casting the male lead. Lambert recalled that the video had "no formula" and that they were "inventing it as we went along". Because Madonna was scheduled to be in Los Angeles, they decided to set and film there, drawing on Lambert's familiarity with its downtown scene and its arts community. Musician Louis "Louie Louie" Cordero, then working as a car salesman in Southern California, was cast as the singer's love interest. Cordero later recalled that appearing in the video inspired him to abandon car sales and pursue a career in music. A then-unknown John Leguizamo made one of his earliest screen appearances as an extra.

For the video, Madonna drew on the eclectic style she had developed while living in Manhattan's East Village, pairing mismatched layers of lace, lycra, sweatshirts, and dresses inspired by hip-hop, Puerto Rican street culture, and graffiti art with rags tied in her hair. She accessorized the look with crucifixes and stacked black rubber bracelets fashioned from typewriter drive belts. Artist Keith Haring decorated several of the garments, including a denim jacket emblazoned with the graffiti phrase "Boy Toy" and a skirt. Madonna also incorporated breakdancing into the video. The video alternates between color and black-and-white sequences. Lambert later recalled that the decision initially alarmed Madonna's manager, Freddy DeMann, who believed combining the two formats was unprecedented. According to Lambert, he even screened the video for the secretaries in his office to gauge their reactions because he felt she had "crossed a line that shouldn't be crossed".

=== Synopsis and release ===
The video follows the singer after she's discovered by a British photographer while dancing with a group of inner-city youths on the streets of Los Angeles. She embarks on a modeling career and eventually appears on the cover of a magazine named Gloss, but becomes torn between the photographer's glamorous lifestyle and her Hispanic street boyfriend. During a graffiti-themed photo shoot, she accidentally spray-paints the photographer's sports car, jeopardizing her budding career, before ultimately returning to her boyfriend and reuniting with him over a game of pool. The scenes depicting Madonna's life on the streets of Los Angeles and her relationship with her Hispanic boyfriend are presented in color, while those involving the British photographer and her modeling career appear in black-and-white.

"Borderline" premiered on MTV the week of March 24, 1984. Author Mark Bego wrote that the video's heavy rotation on the channel transformed Madonna from "unknown" to "immediately recognizable". Because her previous releases had not been supported by hit videos, she had previously been "a voice without a face"; Bego remarked that she had finally crossed the "'borderline' between anonymity and stardom". "Borderline" was later included in Madonna's video compilations The Immaculate Collection (1990) and Celebration: The Video Collection (2009).

=== Reception and analysis ===
According to Rolling Stone, the video was Madonna's first to tell a story successfully. Keith Thomas gave a negative review, finding it "uneven and hard to follow" and criticizing its disjointed storyline. Despite such criticism, the clip earned Madonna a nomination for Best New Artist at the inaugural MTV Video Music Awards. Retrospective reviews were more favorable, with TheBacklot.com and Slant Magazine ranking the video among the singer's best, while praising her "contagious yearning" and the clip's "simple and direct" narrative.

The video's fashion has also received retrospective recognition. Slant Magazine credited it with establishing Madonna's "boho-chic" aesthetic and urban image, while Mark Bego wrote that the mismatched layered ensamble quickly became known as "the Madonna look". Daryl Easlea noted that the graffiti "Boy Toy" motif introduced in the video became one of Madonna's early signifiers, and Carol Clerk wrote that her style would go on influence the collections of designers such as Christian Lacroix and Karl Lagerfeld. People magazine later included the look among Madonna's best style moments, while Out magazine's Julien Sauvalle considered "Borderline" one of her "most stylish" videos and cited it as an influence on Rihanna's "We Found Love" (2011).

The visual has been the subject of academic and critical analysis for its representation of race, gender, and identity. Douglas Kellner argued that it challenged contemporary taboos by depicting an interracial romance between Madonna and a Hispanic man, while its contrasting color and black-and-white sequences framed identity as fluid and performative through fashion and image. Matthew Lindsay of The Quietus compared the video to the 1975 film Mahogany, as both center on an interracial relationship and a young woman's rise through the fashion industry. Author Leah Perry argued that the video's significance extended beyond its portrayal of an interracial relationship, engaging with broader struggles over immigration, gender roles, and multiculturalism that were at the forefront of American politics in the 1980s.

Writing in Madonna's Drowned Worlds, Santiago Fouz-Hernández and Freya Jarman-Ivens identified "Borderline" as the beginning of Madonna's recurring adoption of non-Western identities, a motif they argued continued in later videos such as "La Isla Bonita". They observed that, although Madonna moves through Latino spaces in both videos, she ultimately remains separate from the communities they depict. Fouz-Hernández and Jarman-Ivens further interpreted Madonna's act of spray-painting the photographer's car as a symbolic rejection of his values and a reaffirmation of her street life. Drawing on Cathy Schwichtenberg's characterization of the video as a "reflexive commentary" on the male gaze countered by a feminine "look", the authors argued that Madonna is positioned as both the object and subject of the gaze through her relationships with the Hispanic boyfriend and British photographer, placing her between competing gendered and cultural identities.

Camille Paglia interpreted the video as reflecting Madonna's own transition from street culture to mainstream stardom. She argued that the juxtaposition of the gritty, multi-racial street and the glamorous fashion world mirrored the dualities emerging in the singer's life and career, an idea echoed by Kellner, who wrote it projected "the fantasy that one can have it all, crossing borderlines from one culture to another [and] appropriating the pleasures of both".

== Live performances ==
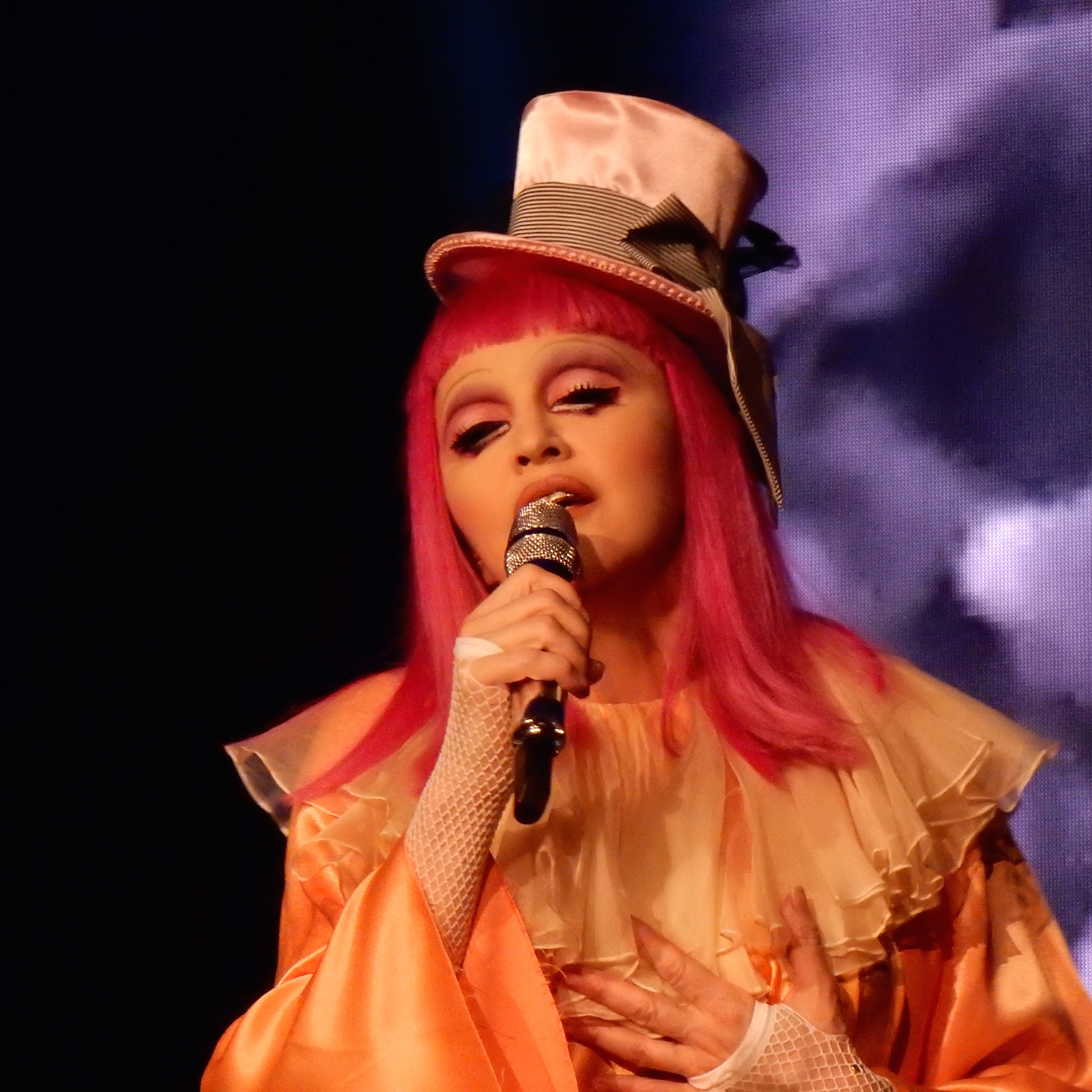
Madonna singing "Borderline" on her Tears of a Clown show

On February 12, 1984, Madonna performed "Borderline" on the WSB-TV program The Dance Show, accompanied by dancers Erika Belle and Bags Rilez. The song then featured on her Virgin (1985) and Sticky & Sweet (2008) concert tours. On the first, Madonna sang as smoke billowed across the stage, wearing a black "punked-out" outfit and accompanied by two male dancers. Gary Graff of the Ledger-Enquirer listed "Borderline" among the concert's highlights.

On the Confessions Tour (2006), "Borderline" was sampled as part of "The Duke Mixes the Hits", a medley that also incorporated elements of "Holiday" (1983), "Dress You Up" (1985), and "Erotica" (1992). An arena rock version of "Borderline" was performed on the Sticky & Sweet Tour, with Madonna playing a purple Gibson Les Paul electric guitar. She wore 1980s-inspired gym shorts, while graffiti and Keith Haring–inspired visuals were projected in the background. Chris Gray of the Houston Press described the number as a "stunner" and praised Madonna for proving that "her guitar was far more than a prop". A performance from the Buenos Aires concerts was captured for the tour's 2010 live album.

On March 10, 2016, Madonna performed an acoustic rendition of the song during her Tears of a Clown show in Melbourne. Dressed as a clown in a pink wig and striped tights, she introduced it by joking, "I don't have bipolar disorder, but I am a little borderline". Footage of the performance was later included in a Tears of a Clown excerpt released as bonus material on the 2017 Rebel Heart Tour video release. Three months later, on June 9, she delivered a slowed-down, soulful version of the song on The Tonight Show Starring Jimmy Fallon, joined by the Roots and watched by then–president of the United States Barack Obama. Parade's Samuel R. Murrian praised Madonna's vocal delivery.

== Cover versions and usage ==
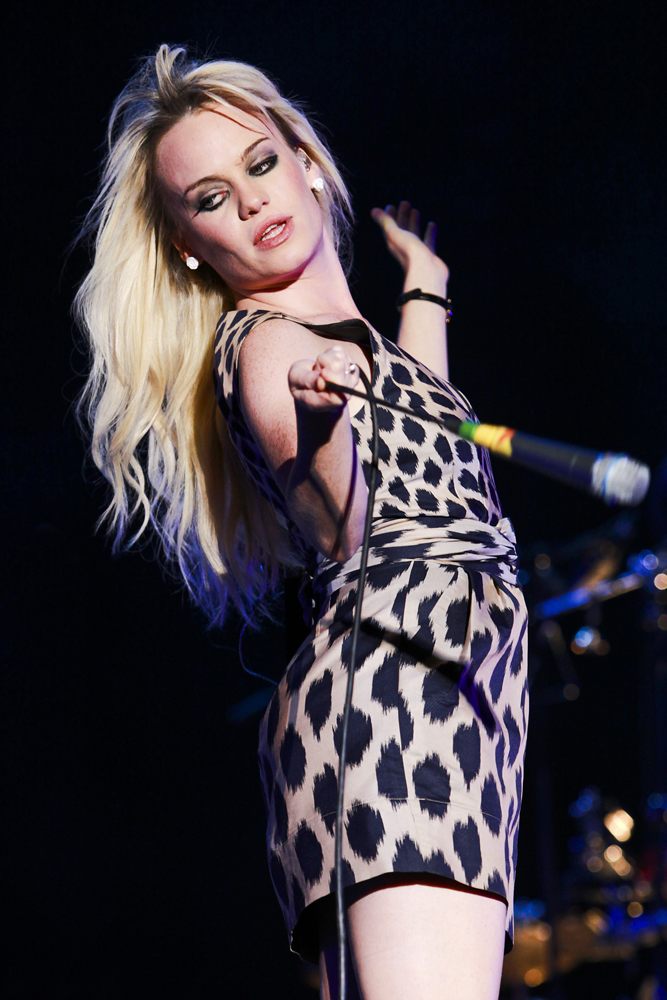
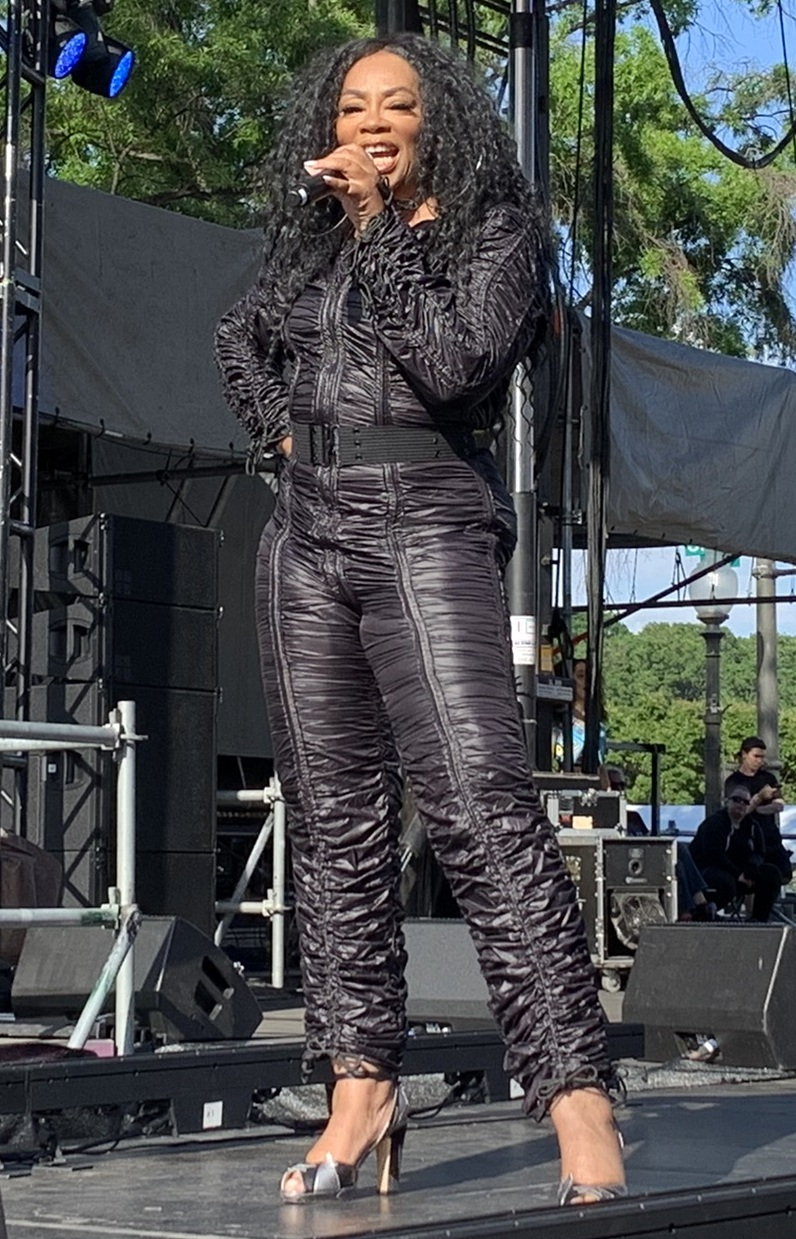
Duffy (left, pictured in 2009) and Jody Watley (right, pictured in 2022) are among the artists who have performed cover versions of "Borderline".

"Borderline" has been covered and referenced in popular culture since its release. In 2000, Canadian musician Nivek Ogre recorded a version for Virgin Voices: A Tribute to Madonna, Vol. 2, which AllMusic's Heather Phares criticized as having "missed the mark". A pop punk version by American band Showoff followed in 2002 for the compilation Punk Goes Pop. Four years later, American singer Jody Watley included a slowed-down, minimalist interpretation of "Borderline" on her album The Makeover, featuring piano, percussion, and synthesizers. Explaining why she chose to cover the song, Watley said she was drawn to its "melancholy side". Entertainment Weekly praised the "gorgeous" rendition for stripping the song back to its essentials and highlighting the "wistful heart" of the lyrics. American Folk-pop duo Chapin Sisters contributed a version to the tribute album Through the Wilderness (2007), and Welsh singer Duffy performed the song live at BBC Radio 1's Big Weekend in 2008, later admitting she had been "terrified" to cover Madonna.

In 2009, the Flaming Lips and Stardeath and White Dwarfs recorded a version for the compilation Covered, A Revolution in Sound, which Stephen Thomas Erlewine said turned the original "inside out". Reviewing the album, ABC News praised the cover for making the song "fresh, new and their own" and considered it the compilation's standout track. That same year, Counting Crows released a live recording from London's Royal Albert Hall, which ABC News described as a "strangely country-rock" rendition that felt anticlimactic compared to the Flaming Lips' version. Actors Cory Monteith and Lea Michele performed a mashup of "Borderline" and "Open Your Heart" (1986) in the 2010 Glee episode "The Power of Madonna". Australian guitarist Tommy Emmanuel and singer Amanda Shires recorded a waltz-style rendition for Accomplice One (2018), which Rolling Stone said "retains little of its original feel".

On January 5, 2021, Kelly Clarkson performed the song during the "Kellyoke" segment of The Kelly Clarkson Show. Today praised Clarkson for putting "her own stamp on the pop classic". The Manic Street Preachers performed the song at the 2022 BBC Radio 6 Music Festival before releasing a studio version later that year. In Reservoir Dogs (1992), Mr. Blue (Edward Bunker) remarks, "I like [Madonna's] early stuff. You know, 'Lucky Star', 'Borderline'". "Borderline" was also referenced in a 2017 episode of Will & Grace, in which Will Truman (Eric McCormack) credited it with helping him cope with a breakup.

== Formats and track listings ==
- US seven-inch vinyl
1. "Borderline" (Remix/Edit) – 3:58
2. "Think of Me" – 4:53
- US twelve-inch single
1. "Borderline" (New Mix) – 6:54
2. "Lucky Star" (New Mix) – 7:13
- US twelve-inch promo
1. "Borderline" (New Mix) – 6:54
2. "Borderline" (Instrumental) – 5:41
- Australian "Triple Mix" twelve-inch single
1. "Borderline" (New Extended Mix) – 6:54
2. "Borderline" (Edit (Radio Version)) – 3:58
3. "Borderline" (Instrumental Mix) – 5:41
- 1986 British seven-inch vinyl / European picture disc
1. "Borderline" (Edit) – 3:58
2. "Physical Attraction" – 3:49
- Limited Italian twelve-inch vinyl
1. "Over and Over" – 4:09
2. "Borderline" – 6:54
- 1989 European mini CD
1. "Lucky Star" – 7:13
2. "Borderline" – 6:54
- 1995 European CD single
1. "Borderline" – 5:17
2. "Borderline (U.S. Remix)" – 6:58
3. "Physical Attraction" – 6:33
- 2023 Digital single
1. "Borderline" - 5:20
2. "Borderline" (7" Remix) - 3:58
3. "Borderline" (U.S. Remix) - 6:56

== Credits and personnel ==
Credits adapted from the Madonna album liner notes.

- Madonna – vocals
- Reggie Lucas – songwriter, producer
- Anthony Jackson – electric bass
- Dean Gant – synthesizers, electric and acoustic piano
- Fred Zarr – synthesizers, electric and acoustic piano
- Ed Walsh – synthesizers
- Ira Siegel – guitars
- Leslie Ming – LinnDrum programming
- Gwen Guthrie – background vocals
- Norma Jean Wright – background vocals
- Brenda White – background vocals
- Chrissy Faith – background vocals

== Charts ==
=== Weekly charts ===
1984 weekly chart performance for "Borderline"
Chart (1984)	Peak position
Australia (Kent Music Report)	12
Canada Top Singles (RPM)	25
Canada (The Record)	22
New Zealand (Recorded Music NZ)	47
Nicaragua (UPI)	9
Switzerland (Schweizer Hitparade)	23
UK Singles (Official Charts)	56
US Billboard Hot 100	10
US Adult Contemporary (Billboard)	23
US Dance Club Songs (Billboard)	4
US Cash Box Top 100	9
US Radio & Records CHR & Pop Charts	13

1986 weekly chart performance for "Borderline"
Chart (1986)	Peak position
Belgium (Ultratop 50 Flanders)	3
Belgium (Ultratop 50 Wallonia)	2
European Hot 100 Singles (Music & Media)	29
European Airplay Top 50 (Music & Media)	25
Finland (Suomen virallinen lista)	16
Ireland (IRMA)	1
Netherlands (Dutch Top 40)	2
Netherlands (Single Top 100)	3
UK Singles (Official Charts)	2

=== Year-end charts ===
1984 year-end chart performance for "Borderline"
Chart (1984)	Position
Australia (Kent Music Report)	75
US Billboard Hot 100	35
US Cash Box Top 100	67

1986 year-end chart performance for "Borderline"
Chart (1986)	Position
Belgium (Ultratop 50 Flanders)	31
Netherlands (Dutch Top 40)	11
Netherlands (Single Top 100)	14
UK Singles (Official Charts)	50

=== Decade-end charts ===
Decade-end chart performance for "Borderline"
Chart (1980–1989)	Position
Netherlands (Dutch Top 40)	86

== Certifications and sales ==
Certifications and sales for "Borderline"
Region	Certification	Certified units/sales
United Kingdom (BPI)	Gold	298,388
United States (RIAA)	Gold	500,000^{^}
^{^} Shipments figures based on certification alone.

== Literary sources ==
- Bailey, Jason (2013). Pulp Fiction: The Complete Story of Quentin Tarantino's Masterpiece. Voyageur Press. ISBN 978-1-61058-917-8.
- Bego, Mark (2000). Madonna: Blonde Ambition. Cooper Square Press. ISBN 978-0-8154-1051-5.
- Clerk, Carol (2012). Madonnastyle. Omnibus Press. ISBN 978-2-909828-89-3.
- Cross, Mary (2007). Madonna: A Biography. Greenwood Publishing Group. ISBN 978-0-313-33811-3.
- Dean, Maury (2003). Rock 'n' Roll Gold Rush: A Singles Un-Cyclopedia. Algora Publishing. ISBN 978-0-87586-207-1.
- Easlea, Daryl (2012). Madonna: Blond Ambition. Backbeat Books. ISBN 978-1-61713-034-2.
- Fouz-Hernández, Santiago; Jarman-Ivens, Freya (2004). Madonna's Drowned Worlds. Ashgate Publishing, Ltd. ISBN 978-0-7546-3371-6.
- Gnojewski, Carol (2008). Madonna: Express Yourself. Enslow Publishing. ISBN 978-0-7660-2442-7.
- Kellner, Douglas (1995). Media Culture: Cultural Studies, Identity, and Politics Between the Modern and the Postmodern. Routledge. ISBN 978-0-415-10570-5.
- Marsh, Dave (1999). The Heart of Rock & Soul: The 1001 Greatest Singles Ever Made. Hachette Book Group. ISBN 978-0-452-26305-5.
- Matthew-Walker, Robert (1991). Madonna: The Biography. Sidgwick & Jackson. ISBN 978-0-330-31482-4.
- Morton, Andrew (2001). Madonna. Macmillan Publishers. ISBN 978-0-312-98310-9.
- Perry, Leah (2016). The Cultural Politics of U.S. Immigration: Gender, Race and Media. New York University Press. ISBN 978-1-4798-8079-9.
- Pettegrew, John; Keetley, Dawn (2002). Public Women, Public Words: 1960 to the present. Madison House. ISBN 978-0-7425-2236-7.
- Pollock, Bruce (2005). Rock Song Index: The 7500 Most Important Songs for the Rock & Roll Era. Routledge. ISBN 978-0-415-97073-0.
- Rettenmund, Matthew (1995). Encyclopedia Madonnica. St. Martin's Press. ISBN 978-0-312-11782-5.
- Madonna: The Rolling Stone Files. Hyperion Press. 1997. ISBN 978-0-7868-8154-3.
- Rooksby, Rikky (2004). The Complete Guide to the Music of Madonna. Omnibus Press. ISBN 978-0-7119-9883-4.
- Sullivan, Caroline (2014). Madonna: Her Story. Seven Oaks Publishing. ISBN 978-1-78177-179-2.
- Tannenbaum, Rob; Marks, Craig (2011). I Want My MTV: The Uncensored Story of the Music Video Revolution. E. P. Dutton. ISBN 978-1-101-52641-5.
- Taraborrelli, Randy J. (2001). Madonna: An Intimate Biography. Simon & Schuster. ISBN 978-0-283-07289-5.
