= Lucky Star (Madonna song) =

1983 single by Madonna

- Cover used for most releases

Single by Madonna

from the album Madonna
- B-side: "I Know It"; "Think of Me"; "Everybody"
- Released: September 9, 1983
- Studio: Sigma Sound (New York City)
- Genre: Dance-pop
- Length: 5:37
- Label: Sire; Warner Bros.
- Songwriter: Madonna
- Producer: Reggie Lucas

Madonna singles chronology
"Holiday" (1983)	"Lucky Star" (1983)	"Borderline" (1984)

Music video
- "Lucky Star" on YouTube

"Lucky Star" is a song by American singer Madonna from her 1983 self-titled debut album. Written by Madonna and produced by Reggie Lucas, it was later remixed by John "Jellybean" Benitez after creative differences arose between the singer and Lucas during the recording sessions. A medium-paced dance-pop song, its lyrics compare a lover to a guiding star through celestial imagery and a refrain adapted from the nursery rhyme "Star Light, Star Bright". Released as a single in Europe in September 1983 and in the United States in August 1984, "Lucky Star" became Madonna's first top-five hit on the US Billboard Hot 100. Initial reviews ranged from positive to mixed, with critics praising its upbeat sound, though some found it lyrically slight. Retrospective reviews have identified it as a defining song of Madonna's early career.

The accompanying music video, directed by Arthur Pierson, features Madonna dancing with her brother Christopher Ciccone and dancer Erika Belle against a white backdrop. Its fashion, imagery, and themes have attracted critical analysis, with authors crediting it with establishing the singer's early persona and helping popularize her distinctive style among young female audiences. Madonna has performed "Lucky Star" on four of her concert tours, the last being the Rebel Heart Tour (2015–2016). The song has since appeared in films and television programs, and has been covered and sampled by several artists.

== Background ==
By late 1980, Madonna was performing with Dan and Ed Gilroy's band Breakfast Club, first as a drummer and later as a guitarist, appearing at downtown Manhattan venues such as CBGB. Although she enjoyed the exposure, tensions arose as her ambitions and growing stage presence increasingly clashed with the group's dynamic, leading her to leave the band. In November, she reunited with Stephen Bray, a former boyfriend and drummer from Ann Arbor, and the pair formed the band Emmy. After securing a showcase at Max's Kansas City in 1981, they attracted the interest of Gotham Records, but negotiations collapsed when the label pushed for a rock-oriented sound while Madonna insisted on pursuing dance music. Immersed in New York's club scene, she studied emerging dance trends to inform her own songwriting and performance style, and with Bray recorded a four-track demo that included "Everybody", "Burning Up", and "Ain't No Big Deal". Madonna promoted the demo herself at local clubs, eventually bringing it to DJ and A&R executive Mark Kamins.

Impressed by "Everybody", Kamins began playing the track at Danceteria, where its enthusiastic reception on the dance floor encouraged him to help Madonna secure a recording contract. He took the demo to Sire Records president Seymour Stein, who directed him to A&R executive Michael Rosenblatt. Rosenblatt signed Madonna to Sire shortly thereafter, with Stein later formalizing the agreement from his hospital bed while recovering from heart surgery. "Everybody" was released as Madonna's debut single on October 6, 1982. Following its success, Sire greenlit a full-length album. Around this time, Rosenblatt gave Madonna a Casiotone keyboard with a built-in cassette recorder, on which she wrote "Lucky Star" within two weeks. According to author Andrew Morton, Madonna wrote the song on a yellow legal notepad in acknowledgment of her first record deal and dedicated it to Kamins. Stephen Thomas Erlewine added that she may have hoped the song would be played at New York's Danceteria nightclub. "Lucky Star" was one of three songs she composed for the album before recording sessions began, alongside "Think of Me" and "I Know It".

== Recording ==
"She was unhappy with the whole damn thing, so I went in and sweetened up a lot of music for her, adding some guitars to 'Lucky Star', some voices, some magic. I just wanted to do the best job I could do for her. When we would play back 'Holiday' or 'Lucky Star', you could see that she was overwhelmed by how great it all sounded".

— John "Jellybean" Benitez recalls his work on "Lucky Star".

"Lucky Star" was recorded at the Sigma Sound Studios in New York. Although Kamins expected to produce, Sire instead hired Warner Bros. producer Reggie Lucas. Rosenblatt explained that Madonna needed a producer with greater experience developing vocal performances, and "[Mark's] strength was grooves"; he also felt Lucas, who had recently worked with Stephanie Mills and Roberta Flack, could bring an "R&B feel" to Madonna's dance-oriented material. Personnel working on the song included Lucas and Ira Siegel on guitars, Dean Gant and Fred Zarr on keyboards, and Gwen Guthrie, Norma Jean Wright, Brenda White, Chrissy Faith, and Madonna herself on backing vocals.

At first, Madonna deferred to Lucas' judgment in the studio, but as recording progressed she became dissatisfied with his increasingly elaborate production style, feeling it strayed from the simplicity of her original demos. She later recalled that it was only when the album was nearly complete that she realized she knew "[a lot] more about this than I'm allowing myself to speak out about", preferring the songs to be "simpler [and] sparser". Early versions of "Lucky Star" included an R&B-influenced take and a guitar-heavy arrangement, the latter of which Madonna abandoned after a negative experience with a rock guitarist.

Unsatisfied, Madonna turned to her then-boyfriend, DJ and remixer John "Jellybean" Benitez. Benitez remixed Lucas' original production, giving "Lucky Star" greater "urgency" by adding a synthesized disco beat, soulful flourishes, new wave elements, a jittering guitar line, and new backing vocals. He later described his contribution as "additional production, or co-producing", noting that although Lucas retained the production credit, his work resulted in "totally different mixes". After the song was completed, executives at Sire and Warner Bros. were so enthusiastic about "Lucky Star" that they proposed it as the title of Madonna's debut album. The singer, however, ultimately opted for the self-titled Madonna, believing a singular name carried greater "star power".

== Composition and release ==
"Lucky Star"
28-second audio sample of "Lucky Star", featuring Madonna singing the refrain adapted from the nursery rhyme "Star Light, Star Bright" in high-pitched vocals.

"Lucky Star" was written by Madonna, and produced by Reggie Lucas. Musically, it has been noted as a medium-paced dance-pop song that opens with shimmering programmed glissandos before giving way to "crystalline" guitar lines, synthesizer textures, and a "chugging" bassline. Its "sparse" arrangement combines electronic drums reinforced by handclaps, bubbling synthesizer bass, and guitars that progress from clean post-disco riffs to more distorted tones.

Lyrically, Madonna compares her lover to a guiding star who "make[s] the darkness seem so far" and remains by her side whenever she feels lost. The refrain adapts lines from the nineteenth-century nursery rhyme "Star Light, Star Bright", which Madonna delivers using "helium-tinged" vocals that author Rikky Rooksby compared to those of Cyndi Lauper. Later lyrics become more suggestive with the line "Shine your heavenly body tonight". Daryl Easlea, however, wrote that the song's celestial imagery can be seen as a tribute to Madonna's late mother.

Although "Lucky Star" was initially intended to serve as the lead single from the Madonna album, plans changed after "Holiday" gained strong club support and reached number one on Billboard's Dance Club Songs chart. Sire released "Holiday" on September 7, 1983, while "Lucky Star" followed in Europe two days later. The music video for "Lucky Star" later received heavy rotation on MTV, prompting Sire to release the song in the United States on August 8, 1984. According to Benitez, the label had planned the release without informing Madonna, who was "really not happy" when she learned this. Music executive Jeff Ayeroff similarly recalled that the singer initially opposed the release, but agreed amid financial pressure. The single's sleeve was designed by Madonna's friend Martin Burgoyne. "Lucky Star" was later included on Madonna's compilation albums The Immaculate Collection (1990) and Celebration (2009). An extended remix of the song was included on the Japan-exclusive extended play (EP) Like a Virgin & Other Big Hits!

== Critical reception ==
Initial reviews of "Lucky Star" ranged from positive to mixed. Daryl Easlea and Billboard's Brian Chin both considered it the strongest song on the album, while Cash Box praised Madonna's "distinctive vocals and lyrical knack". Robert Matthew-Walker praised "Lucky Star" as a "cumulative, hypnotic" opening number and an "excellent first track", a sentiment later echoed by Rolling Stone and Slant Magazine. NME described the song as "half Stacy Lattisaw, half Marilyn Monroe", noting it had a stronger beat than "Everybody", and Roger Le Lievre of The Ann Arbor News called it a "gem", praising its lush sound and comparing it to the early work of Stephanie Mills. Mark Bego described the track as "bright" and "optimistic", Simon Gage and Lisa Richards characterized it as "happy", while author Matthew Rettenmund called it a "perky love song". Santiago Fouz-Hernández, Freya Jarman-Ivens, and Gay Star News suggested that songs such as "Lucky Star" helped establish Madonna's appeal within the LGBTQ+ community.

Other reviews were more reserved. The Morning Call considered "Lucky Star" Madonna's strongest vocal performance up to the time, though it found the lyrics unmemorable, comparing them to a "grocery list". Terry Hazlett of the Observer–Reporter described it as "inoffensive, danceable [but] ultimately forgettable". Richard Defendorf of the Orlando Sentinel remarked that while the arrangements were solid, Madonna's "tiny" voice left uncertainty as to whether she was an enjoyable novelty or an artist with lasting potential. Pete Bishop of The Pittsburgh Press found it "not very challenging", and criticized the singer's vocals as lacking character and sounding "nasal", "shrill", and "tinny".

Retrospective reviews have been positive, with critics often ranking "Lucky Star" among Madonna's strongest singles. (Note: Attributed to multiple sources, including The A.V. Club, The Arizona Republic, Billboard, TheBacklot.com, Boston.com, Classic Pop, The Daily Telegraph, The Detroit News, Entertainment Weekly, Gay Star News, Jenesaispop, Parade, PinkNews, Rolling Stone, and USA Today.) Billboard described it as an "irresistible dance hit", praising Madonna for transforming the nursery rhyme "Star Light, Star Bright" into a "radio-ready earworm", while Entertainment Weekly called it a "radiant twirler [that] feels as if it comes equipped with its own disco ball". The Detroit News wrote that, despite its dated production, the song's simplicity and "childlike, lullaby chorus" still "work like a charm". Guillermo Alonso of Vanity Fair España regarded the song as valuable for preserving an "innocent and childlike" side of Madonna that she would never revisit. Some critics have also credited "Lucky Star" with establishing Madonna's signature sound and artistic identity. Slant Magazine wrote that it established her as "a one-woman girlie show", while The Guardian described it as "the first properly polished, distinctively Madonna-sounding pop song". PinkNews wrote: "If you've ever wondered why Madonna is credited with giving birth to the modern day pop star, don't bother looking any further than 'Lucky Star'", citing its lasting influence on artists such as Dua Lipa and Lady Gaga. "Lucky Star" was included in Bruce Pollock's Rock Song Index: The 7500 Most Important Songs for the Rock & Roll Era.

== Chart performance ==
In the United States, the double-sided single "Holiday" / "Lucky Star" reached number one on Billboard's Dance Club Songs chart dated September 24, 1983, giving Madonna her first number-one hit on any Billboard survey. It remained at the top for five consecutive weeks and finished 1983 as the third best-performing song on the year-end Dance Club Songs chart. On August 25, 1984, Billboard reported "Lucky Star" as the most-added song on US radio, preceding its debut at number 49 on the Billboard Hot 100. On October 20, it peaked at number four, becoming Madonna's first top-five entry on the chart. According to Rosenblatt, it became the singer's biggest-selling and fastest-climbing single up to the time, sending sales of the Madonna album "through the roof". The song also reached number 19 on the Hot Adult Contemporary chart and ranked number 66 on the Billboard Hot 100 year-end chart for 1984. As of August 2024, Billboard ranked "Lucky Star" as Madonna's 33rd most successful Hot 100 entry. In Canada, the single entered the RPM Top Singles chart at number 89 in September, later peaking at number eight and ranking number 72 on the year-end chart. It became Madonna's first top ten hit in the nation, and her third top 40 hit.

In the United Kingdom, "Lucky Star" initially failed to chart following its September 1983 release. After the success of "Holiday", however, Warner Bros. re-released and re-promoted the single, which caused it to debut at number 47 on the UK Singles Chart on March 17, 1984. It peaked at number 14 three weeks later and remained on the chart for nine weeks. According to Music Week, the single had sold over 117,000 copies in the United Kingdom by August 2008. Elsewhere in Europe, it achieved moderate success, reaching the top 30 in Belgium and the top 20 in Ireland. The song also entered the European Hot 100 Singles at number 74, eventually peaking at number 29. In Australia, the single reached number 36.

== Music video ==
=== Background and release ===
Screenshot of Madonna in the "Lucky Star" music video. The video helped establish her as a fashion icon, with her ribbons and lace gloves becoming widely imitated by young women.

The music video for "Lucky Star" was directed by Arthur Pierson and produced by Simon Fields and Glenn Goodwin. Wayne Isham served as director of photography, while Madonna was the video's art director. Filmed in February 1984 at the Chaplin Studios in Los Angeles on a budget of $14,000, it recreates the singer's early club performances in a "bare-bones" style, with Madonna dancing alongside her brother Christopher Ciccone and dancer Erika Belle against a plain white backdrop. Ciccone later recalled that although they were paid modestly for their participation, the camaraderie among the group made the experience rewarding.

Madonna wears a black mesh crop top, fingerless lace gloves, a black skirt over cropped leggings, and a black ribbon in her hair, accessorized with star-shaped jewelry and crucifixes hanging from her ears and waist. She remarked that her use of religious imagery was "kind of offbeat [and] interesting" and "tongue-in-cheek". Although Belle later claimed credit for designing the outfit, biographer Mary Cross wrote that Madonna was largely wearing her everyday clothes while deliberately cultivating a distinctive visual identity to distinguish herself from contemporaries such as Boy George, Cyndi Lauper, and David Bowie.

The video opens with a close-up of Madonna lowering her sunglasses and staring directly at the camera before transitioning to choreographed dance sequences featuring Ciccone and Belle. Frequent close-up shots emphasize her impish, showy, and coquettish persona. The video was added to MTV during the week of June 2, 1984. It was later included in Madonna's video compilations The Immaculate Collection (1990) and Celebration: The Video Collection (2009).

=== Analysis and reception ===
According to Cross, the "Lucky Star" video sparked the "rush for Madonna fashion", with Rolling Stone noting that hair ribbons and cut-off gloves quickly became "must-have" teenage fashion items. Matthew Jacobs of the HuffPost similarly credited the video with establishing Madonna as a fashion icon whose look was widely emulated by teenage girls and continues to inspire Halloween costumes. Authors Shari Benstock and Suzanne Ferriss identified it as an early showcase of Madonna as an innovative fashion trendsetter, while Rettenmund wrote that it "immortalized" her belly button and "Boy Toy" image. Dance historian Sally Banes likewise argued that, despite its seemingly simple presentation, the video is a "complexly layered" work that helped define the singer's early "Boy Toy" persona.

Banes went on to say that the video's rapid editing and alternating solo and group dance sequences construct a multifaceted image of Madonna, who adopts multiple personas—including a "sultry temptress", an androgynous street dancer, and a break-dancing boy—to blend innocence, sensuality, and androgyny while challenging conventional representations of femininity. Matthew Lindsay of The Quietus observed that, framed against the white backdrop, Madonna resembles Keith Haring's "Radiant Baby", simultaneously projecting innocence and knowingness.

Banes further interpreted the singer's direct gaze into the camera and suggestive choreography as expressions of narcissistic self-love and feminist self-sufficiency, arguing that Madonna is eroticized for her own pleasure rather than as a passive object of the male gaze. Adam Sexton observed that although the video may appear to cater to a male gaze, Madonna controls how she is viewed through humorous self-aware gestures.

Retrospective reviews of the video have been positive. Stewart Mason of AllMusic called it "powerfully effective", arguing that its minimalist presentation was "500 times sexier than the entire Sex book". Similarly, Boston.com's Scott Kearnan praised the video's simplicity and Madonna's "assured gaze", which conveyed both "sexiness and strength". He also credited the video with establishing a visual template that subsequent female pop artists would imitate. TheBacklot.com ranked it Madonna's 19th-best music video, praising her commanding screen presence and skillful dancing.

== Live performances ==
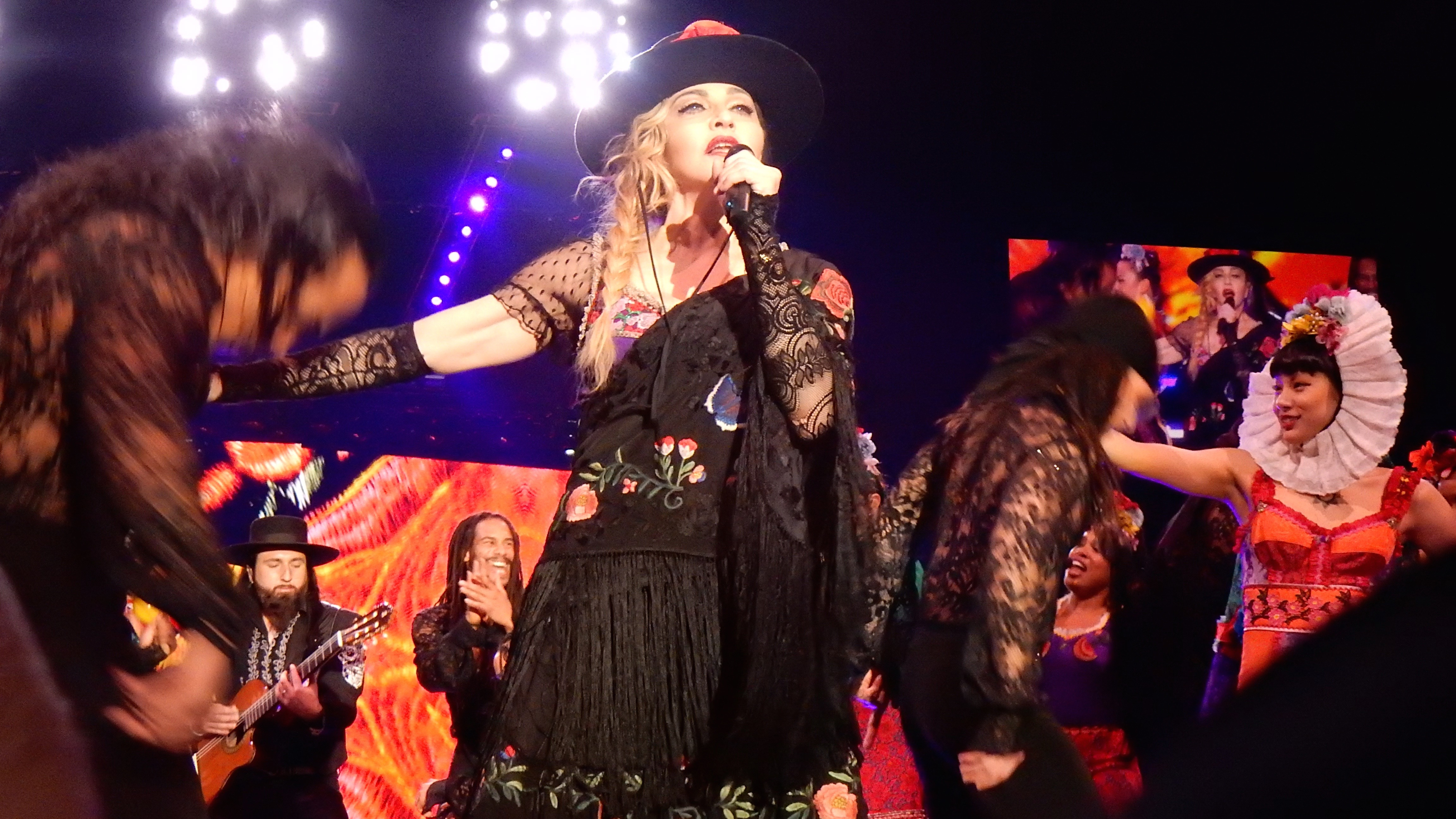
Madonna singing "Lucky Star" on the Rebel Heart Tour (2015–2016), where it was incorporated into a Latin-themed medley with "Dress You Up" and "Into the Groove".

On October 15, 1983, Madonna performed "Lucky Star" at London's Camden Palace. The Guardian praised her husky vocals and energetic dancing. The song was then included in four of her concert tours: Virgin (1985), Who's That Girl (1987), Confessions (2006), and Rebel Heart (2015–2016). On the first, Madonna sang wearing an all-black fringed crop top and skirt that exposed her midriff, accessorized with crucifixes of varying sizes. A recording of the performance at Detroit's Cobo Arena was included in the tour's video release.

The performance on the Who's That Girl World Tour had Madonna performing beneath a disco ball, wearing a black corset with gold tassels, black panties, and ankle boots. Chicago Tribune writers Scott A. Zamost and Elizabeth Snead noted that while her vocals were strong, they were frequently "drowned out" by an overpowering backing band. A rendition from this tour was included on the video release Ciao Italia: Live from Italy (1988).

During the Confessions Tour, Madonna performed a techno-infused version of "Lucky Star" that transitioned into "Hung Up" (2005), wearing an illuminated white cape embroidered with "Dancing Queen". Variety gave the number a mixed review, citing Madonna's off-key vocals but noting that they suggested there were "live elements" in a show dominated by "electronically triggered sounds". The performance from the concerts at London's Wembley Arena was included on the tour's live album (2007).

"Lucky Star" was among the songs sampled in "Radio Dial Static", a video interlude featured on the MDNA Tour (2012). On the Rebel Heart Tour, "Lucky Star" was included in a slow, Latin-inspired medley with "Dress You Up" and "Into the Groove" (both 1985), accompanied by Day of the Dead–themed visuals. Madonna performed the number wearing a black dress, hat, and shawl. Billboard's Joe Lynch praised the Spanish guitar arrangement, though he felt the maracas were "a little much". On July 27, 2023, Madonna posted an Instagram video of herself dancing to "Lucky Star" to commemorate the 40th anniversary of the parent album.

== Cover versions and usage ==
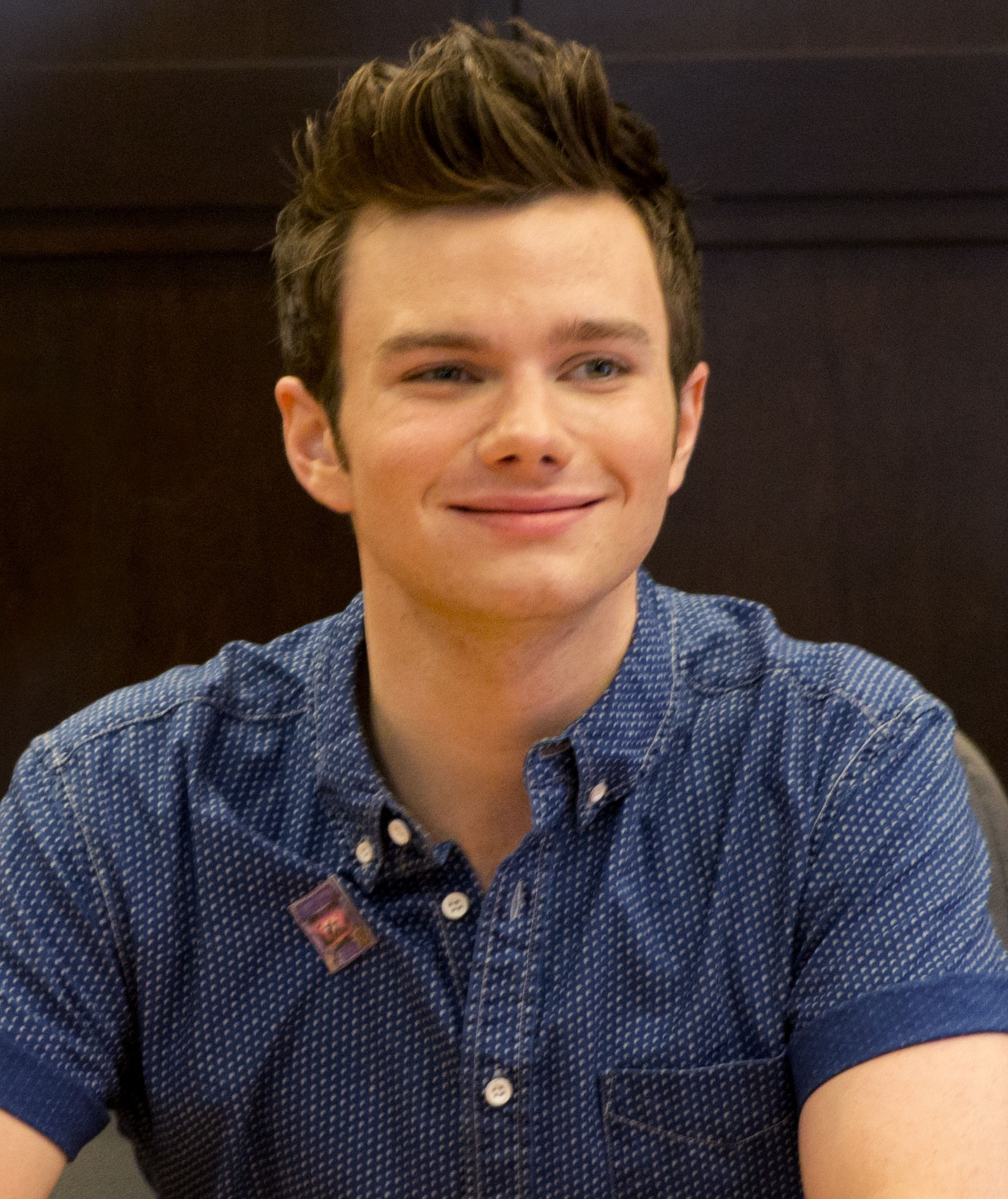
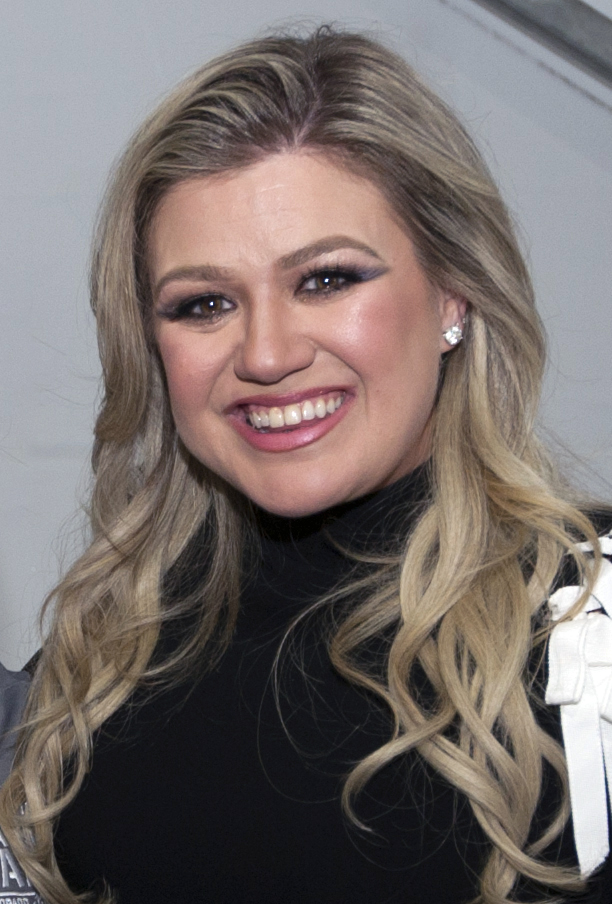
Chris Colfer (left, pictured in 2013) and Kelly Clarkson (right, pictured in 2018) are among the artists who have performed cover versions of "Lucky Star".

"Lucky Star" has been covered, sampled, and referenced in popular culture since its release. American singer Michael Hedges performed a rock-oriented version in a 1993 concert. A cover by American band Switchblade Symphony appeared on the 2000 tribute album Virgin Voices: A Tribute to Madonna, Vol. 2, with AllMusic's Heather Phares highlighting it as a standout track. In 2014, Chris Colfer and June Squibb performed the song in the Glee episode "Old Dog, New Tricks". Discussing the rendition, Colfer described "Lucky Star" as "so difficult" to sing, adding that Squibb "sounds so much better than I do on it". Eva Noblezada recorded a cover of "Lucky Star" for the opening sequence of the 2022 film Luck. On October 26, 2023, Kelly Clarkson performed the song during the "Kellyoke" segment of The Kelly Clarkson Show. Reviewers praised her rendition, highlighting her vocal performance and the accompaniment by her band and backing vocalists. Carly Rae Jepsen sampled the song on her 2017 single "Cut to the Feeling".

The song was featured in the 1988 film Running on Empty during a scene in which River Phoenix's character attends a music class. In Reservoir Dogs (1992), Mr. Blue (Edward Bunker) remarks, "I like [Madonna's] early stuff. You know, 'Lucky Star', 'Borderline'". Two years later, in Pulp Fiction, Fabienne (Maria de Medeiros) tells her boyfriend Butch (Bruce Willis) that she wants a stomach "like Madonna when she did 'Lucky Star'", alluding to the music video. The song also appears in Snatch (2000), directed by Madonna's then-husband Guy Ritchie. In the sitcom Modern Family, Mitchell Pritchett (Jesse Tyler Ferguson) recalls being caught by his father dancing to "Lucky Star" at age 12, describing it as "the most embarrassing thing that a boy can do". In 2019, it was featured in the Euphoria episode "'03 Bonnie and Clyde".

== Formats and track listings ==
- US twelve-inch promo single
1. A. "Lucky Star" – 5:30
2. B. "Holiday" – 6:08
- European seven-inch vinyl
1. "Lucky Star" (Edit) – 3:52
2. "Think of Me" – 4:52
- American seven-inch vinyl / European and British twelve-inch vinyl
1. "Lucky Star" – 5:34
2. "I Know It" – 3:44
- Japanese seven-inch vinyl
1. "Lucky Star" – 5:36
2. "Everybody" – 4:53
- 1989 European mini CD
1. "Lucky Star" – 7:13
2. "Borderline" – 6:54
- 2023 digital single
1. "Lucky Star" – 5:36
2. "Lucky Star" (7" Edit) – 3:52
3. "Lucky Star" (U.S. Remix) – 7:15

== Credits and personnel ==
Credits adapted from the Madonna album liner notes.

- Madonna – vocals, songwriter
- Reggie Lucas – producer
- Dean Gant – synthesizer, electric and acoustic piano
- Fred Zarr – synthesizer, electric and acoustic piano
- Ed Walsh – synthesizer
- Ira Siegel – guitar
- Leslie Ming – LinnDrum programming
- Gwen Guthrie – background vocals
- Norma Jean Wright – background vocals
- Brenda White – background vocals
- Chrissy Faith – background vocals

== Charts ==
=== Weekly charts ===
1983—1984 weekly chart performance for "Lucky Star"
Chart (1983–1984)	Peak position
Australia (Kent Music Report)	36
Belgium (Ultratop 50 Flanders)	25
Brazil (ABPD)	3
Canada Top Singles (RPM)	8
Canada (The Record)	16
Canada Adult Contemporary (RPM)	14
European Hot 100 Singles (Music & Media)	29
Ireland (IRMA)	19
UK Singles (Official Charts)	14
UK Dance Singles (Music Week)	11
US Billboard Hot 100	4
US Adult Contemporary (Billboard)	19
US Dance Club Songs (Billboard) with "Holiday"	1
US Cash Box Top 100	7
US CHR & Pop Charts (Radio & Records)	3

2023 weekly chart performance for "Lucky Star"
Chart (2023)	Peak position
US Dance Digital Song Sales (Billboard)	17

=== Year-end charts ===
1983 year-end chart performance for "Lucky Star"
Chart (1983)	Peak position
US Dance Club Songs (Billboard) with "Holiday"	3

1984 year-end chart performance for "Lucky Star"
Chart (1984)	Peak position
Canada Top Singles (RPM)	72
US Billboard Hot 100	66

== Bibliography ==
- Bailey, Jason (2013). Pulp Fiction: The Complete Story of Quentin Tarantino's Masterpiece. Voyageur Press. ISBN 978-1-61058-917-8.
- Banes, Sally; Harris, Andrea; Garafola, Lynn (2007). Before, Between, and Beyond: Three Decades of Dance Writing. University of Wisconsin Press. ISBN 978-0-299-22154-6.
- Bego, Mark (2000). Madonna: Blonde Ambition. Cooper Square Press. ISBN 978-0-8154-1051-5.
- Benstock, Shari; Ferriss, Suzanne (1994). On Fashion. Rutgers University Press. ISBN 978-0-8135-2033-9.
- Ciccone, Christopher; Leigh, Wendy (2008). Life with My Sister Madonna. Simon & Schuster. ISBN 978-1-4165-8762-0.
- Clerk, Carol (2012). Madonnastyle. Omnibus Press. ISBN 978-2-909828-89-3.
- Cross, Mary (2007). Madonna: A Biography. Greenwood Publishing Group. ISBN 978-0-313-33811-3.
- Easlea, Daryl (2012). Madonna: Blond Ambition. Backbeat Books. ISBN 978-1-61713-034-2.
- Fouz-Hernández, Santiago; Jarman-Ivens, Freya (2004). Madonna's Drowned Worlds. Ashgate Publishing, Ltd. ISBN 978-0-7546-3371-6.
- Gabriel, Mary (2023). Madonna: A Rebel Life. Hachette UK. ISBN 978-0-316-45644-9.
- Gage, Simon; Richards, Lisa (2002). Queer. Thunder's Mouth Press. ISBN 978-1-56025-377-8.
- Gnojewski, Carol (2008). Madonna: Express Yourself. Enslow Publishing. ISBN 978-0-7660-2442-7.
- Gruner, Oliver (2016). Screening the Sixties: Hollywood Cinema and the Politics of Memory. Macmillan Publishers. ISBN 978-1-137-49632-4.
- Matthew-Walker, Robert (1991). Madonna: The Biography. Sidgwick & Jackson. ISBN 978-0-330-31482-4.
- Morton, Andrew (2001). Madonna. Macmillan Publishers. ISBN 978-0-312-98310-9.
- Pollock, Bruce (2005). Rock Song Index: The 7500 Most Important Songs for the Rock & Roll Era. Routledge. ISBN 978-0-415-97073-0.
- Rettenmund, Matthew (1995). Encyclopedia Madonnica. St. Martin's Press. ISBN 978-0-312-11782-5.
- Rooksby, Rikky (2004). The Complete Guide to the Music of Madonna. Omnibus Press. ISBN 978-0-7119-9883-4.
- Sexton, Adam (1992). Desperately Seeking Madonna: In Search of the Meaning of the World's Most Famous Woman. Random Penguin. ISBN 978-0-307-48374-4.
- St. Michael, Mick (2004). Madonna "Talking": Madonna in Her Own Words. Omnibus Press. ISBN 978-1-84449-418-7.
- Taraborrelli, Randy J. (2001). Madonna: An Intimate Biography. Simon & Schuster. ISBN 978-0-283-07289-5.
- Tannenbaum, Rob; Marks, Craig (2011). I Want My MTV: The Uncensored Story of the Music Video Revolution. E. P. Dutton. ISBN 978-1-101-52641-5.
