= Maripol =

French-American jewellery and fashion designer (born 1957)

- Born: Marie Paule Fauque; Rabat, Morocco
- Occupations: Jewelry designer, photographer, and film producer
- Known for: Madonna's stylist in the 1980s

Marie Paule Fauque (born 1955), known as Maripol, is a French-born American artist, jewelry designer, stylist, photographer, and film producer. Associated with New York City's downtown art and music scene in the 1980s, she is known for styling pop star Madonna as well as her Polaroid photographs of artists and musicians such as Jean-Michel Basquiat, Keith Haring, Andy Warhol, Grace Jones, and Debbie Harry. She served as art director and later worked on post-production for Downtown 81, a film starring Basquiat that documented New York's downtown cultural scene.

== Life and career ==
=== Early life and fashion ===
Maripol was born in Rabat, Morocco, in 1955 and grew up in France. She studied at the École des Beaux-Arts in Nantes before moving to New York City in 1976, at the age of 19, with her then-boyfriend, photographer and filmmaker Edo Bertoglio. She subsequently worked as an assistant to photographer and graphic designer Jean-Paul Goude.

After finding a limited selection of accessories on the market, Maripol began designing her own jewelry. Her work attracted the attention of the Italian fashion retailer Fiorucci, which commissioned her to produce earrings and sent her on an international trip to research jewelry designs. She later worked as a designer for the company and became its art director. Singer Grace Jones served as the original model for Maripol's rubber bracelets in 1977.

=== Photography and the downtown scene ===
Maripol began taking Polaroid photographs with an SX-70 camera in 1977. A regular presence in New York's nightlife, she documented the people she encountered at venues including Studio 54 and the Mudd Club. Her subjects included Andy Warhol, club owner Steve Rubell, Bianca Jagger, Jerry Hall, and Grace Jones. Her photographs also captured artists and musicians associated with the city's downtown scene, including Jean-Michel Basquiat, Keith Haring, and Debbie Harry.

Maripol met Basquiat in 1979, when he was creating graffiti under the name SAMO. The two became acquainted through New York's downtown art scene.

=== Downtown 81 and work with Madonna ===
Maripol served as art director for Downtown 81, a film starring Basquiat and featuring Debbie Harry, with musical performances by several New York No Wave bands. Directed by Bertoglio and written and produced by Glenn O'Brien, the film was shot in 1980 and 1981 under the title New York Beat. It was not released until 2000, when it appeared as Downtown 81. Executive producer Michael Zilkha subsequently enlisted Maripol to assist with the film's post-production. The completed film premiered at the Directors' Fortnight section of the Cannes Film Festival.

In 1982, Maripol established the company Maripolitan P.O.L. and her jewelry was sold at Fiorucci. That year, she met Madonna, beginning a collaboration that helped define the singer's early-1980s visual style. Maripol styled Madonna for her first two studio albums, Madonna (1983) and Like a Virgin (1984), and worked on the music videos for "Burning Up" (1983), "Like a Virgin" (1984), and "Dress You Up" (1985). The look incorporated black rubber bracelets, layered jewelry, and crucifixes, elements that became closely associated with Madonna's early image and the fashion of the decade.

Maripol also developed jewelry and accessories for a wider market. By the mid-1980s, Maripol had established her own shop, Maripolitan, in Manhattan's NoHo neighborhood. In a 1985 interview with Interview magazine, she described her approach as "junk jewelry" influenced by mass media, comparing the rubber bracelet to the mood ring of the 1960s. She added, "I believe in mass market, very low prices. I want every kid who loves Madonna to be able to afford something, to feel like they're buying a little bit of her." In late 1985, Maripol introduced an officially licensed line of Madonna costume jewelery. However, the line was unsuccessful, as Madonna adopted a new look in 1986 with the release of her third studio album, True Blue. Maripol subsequently closed her shop, Maripolitan.

=== Later career ===
Maripol moved to Los Angeles, where she married, and later returned to New York City to raise her son, Lino.

Maripol continued working in music and film, serving as art director for music videos by Cher, D'Angelo, Elton John, and Luther Vandross. She also worked as an art director on films by directors Marcus Nispel and Abel Ferrara.

In 2010, Maripol published Maripol: Little Red Riding Hood, a collection of photographs, sketchbooks, and other material documenting her inspirational material. She also published Maripola X, featuring 200 Polaroid photographs and 69 previously unpublished poems in French and English. That year, she released a jewelry and T-shirt collection inspired by her 1980s designs through Marc by Marc Jacobs stores.

Maripol also collaborated with French composer and producer Léonard Lasry on "Love Each Other," her first recording as a singer. The release followed her collaboration with the French fashion label Each x Other.

In 2013, Maripol directed The Message, a documentary about Keith Haring produced in connection with a retrospective of his work at the Musée d'Art Moderne de Paris.

Her photographs and work have appeared in publications including The New York Times Magazine, Elle, i-D, Women's Wear Daily, InStyle, The Village Voice, and V magazine.

== Exhibitions ==
Maripol's photographs have been exhibited at the Rizzoli and Earl McGrath galleries in New York City. Other exhibitions of her work have taken place at P.S.1 Contemporary Art Center, the Robert Miller Gallery, and Deitch Projects in New York, and at the Musée Maillol in Paris.

== Books ==
- Basquiat, Jean-Michel; O'Brien, Glen (2001). New York Beat: Jean-Michel Basquiat in Downtown 81. Petit Grand Publishing. ISBN 978-4-939102-22-6.
- Maripolarama, powerHouse Books, November 2005 ISBN 978-1-57687-272-7
- Maripol: Little Red Riding Hood, Damiani, September 2010 ISBN 978-88-6208-136-8
