= Like a Virgin & Other Big Hits! =

EP by Madonna
- Released: February 10, 1985
- Recorded: May 1982–September 1984
- Studios: Sigma Sound, New York City
- Length: 26:31
- Labels: Sire; Warner–Pioneer

Madonna chronology
Like a Virgin (1984)	Like a Virgin & Other Big Hits! (1985)	True Blue (1986)

Like a Virgin & Other Big Hits! is an EP by American singer and songwriter Madonna, released on February 10, 1985 through Sire Records. It was originally only available in Japan, but was reissued in North America and Europe in 2016 for Record Store Day. The EP includes four tracks—"Like a Virgin" from the singer's 1984 album of the same name, and "Holiday", "Lucky Star" and "Borderline" from her eponymous debut record.

The EP features remixes by American DJ and producer John "Jellybean" Benitez, previously released on various Madonna maxi singles. While the original edition of Like a Virgin & Other Big Hits! failed to reach any record chart, its 2016 re-release experienced moderate commercial success by reaching four of Billboard's component charts, including the Dance/Electronic Albums and Top Tastemaker Albums charts.

== Composition and release ==
Three of the EP's tracks—"Holiday", "Lucky Star", and "Borderline"—were previously included on Madonna's 1983 debut studio album, Madonna; while the title track's original version was included on her second album Like a Virgin. The record's remixes of "Borderline" and "Lucky Star" produced by John "Jellybean" Benitez were originally paired on a 12" maxi single released in the United States on February 15, 1984.

The record was originally made available for consumption in Japan on February 10, 1985 with a re-release of the EP occurring on April 16, 2016 at worldwide record stores participating in Record Store Day. The new version was pressed on 140 gram colored pink vinyl and was only limited to 4,500 copies.

== Commercial performance ==
At the time of its original pressing, Like a Virgin & Other Big Hits! did not peak on any record chart, but its re-release later experienced moderate commercial success. For the week ending May 7, 2016, the album debuted and peaked at number three on Billboard's Dance/Electronic Albums chart, becoming the week's third highest debut. While dropping off the chart the next week, the EP additionally opened and peaked at number eight on the Top Tastemaker Albums chart, having a similar course.

Like a Virgin & Other Big Hits! also made appearance on the Vinyl Albums and Top Current Albums charts, where it charted at numbers five and ninety-eight, respectively. The following week Like a Virgin, which had already topped the Billboard 200 for three weeks in 1985, was discounted for 99 cents to coincide with the release. This prompted the album to re-enter the Billboard 200 chart at position 124 with sales of 6,000 units, making it a total of 109 weeks on the chart. Most of the sales consisted of digital downloads of the album for around 5,000 copies and was its best sales week since Nielsen SoundScan began tracking sales in the United States from 1991.

== Track listing ==
All tracks are remixed by John "Jellybean" Benitez.

No.	Title	Writer(s)	Length
1.	"Like a Virgin" (Extended Dance Remix)	Tom Kelly; Billy Steinberg	6:10
2.	"Holiday"	Curtis Hudson; Lisa Stevens	6:09
3.	"Lucky Star" (Extended Dance Remix)	Madonna	7:16
4.	"Borderline" (Extended Dance Remix)	Reggie Lucas	6:56
Total length:			26:31

== Charts ==
Chart (2016)	Peak position
UK Official Albums Chart Update (OCC)	40
US Top Current Albums (Billboard)	98
US Top Dance Albums (Billboard)	3
US Indie Store Album Sales (Billboard)	8
US Vinyl Albums (Billboard)	5
