= Erika Belle =

American socialite, art curator, fashion designer, and dancer

Erika Belle is an American socialite, art curator, fashion designer, and dancer, most known for her friendship and work with pop singer Madonna in the 1980s. She has been featured dancing in Madonna's videos to "Everybody", "True Blue", "Papa Don't Preach", "Lucky Star", and "Holiday". She collaborated on choreography to the videos and live shows, and performed with Madonna in various New York clubs and television programs such as Top of the Pops.

As an influential fashion designer of the time, Belle also created many of Madonna’s outfits and performance costumes. Some of them can be seen in videos to "Everybody", "Like a Virgin", "Burning Up", and "Lucky Star". Belle's clothes were carried in several New York boutiques, such as Fiorucci, and appeared in Vogue, The New Yorker, and Elle magazines.

Belle attended New York University and was the owner of the nightclub Lucky Strike on Ninth Street off Third Avenue in Manhattan. Madonna was briefly a bartender at the nightclub.
