= Star Light, Star Bright =

Traditional song

Nursery rhyme
- Published: Mid/late 19th century
- Genre: Children's song
- Composer(s): unknown
- Lyricist(s): unknown

"Star Light, Star Bright" is an English language nursery rhyme of American origin. It has a Roud Folk Song Index number of 16339.

== Lyrics ==
The lyrics usually conform to the following:

Star light, star bright,
First star I see tonight;
I wish I may, I wish I might
Have the wish I wish tonight.

== Origin ==
According to folklorists Iona and Peter Opie, the superstition of hoping for wishes granted when seeing a shooting or falling star may date back to the ancient world. It was also mentioned in The Encyclopedia of Superstitions that wishing on the first star seen may also predate this rhyme. The song "Star Light, Star Bright" first began to be recorded in mid/late nineteenth-century America. It can be found in works dating to at least 1866 as the song appears in "Swallows on the Wing O'er Garden Springs of Delight" by William Furniss. It can also be found in an 1873 article from "To-day" magazine where the song is linked to fortunes. The song and tradition seem to have reached Britain by the early twentieth century and have since spread worldwide.
