= Jeff Ayeroff =

American record executive

Jeffrey Kent Ayeroff
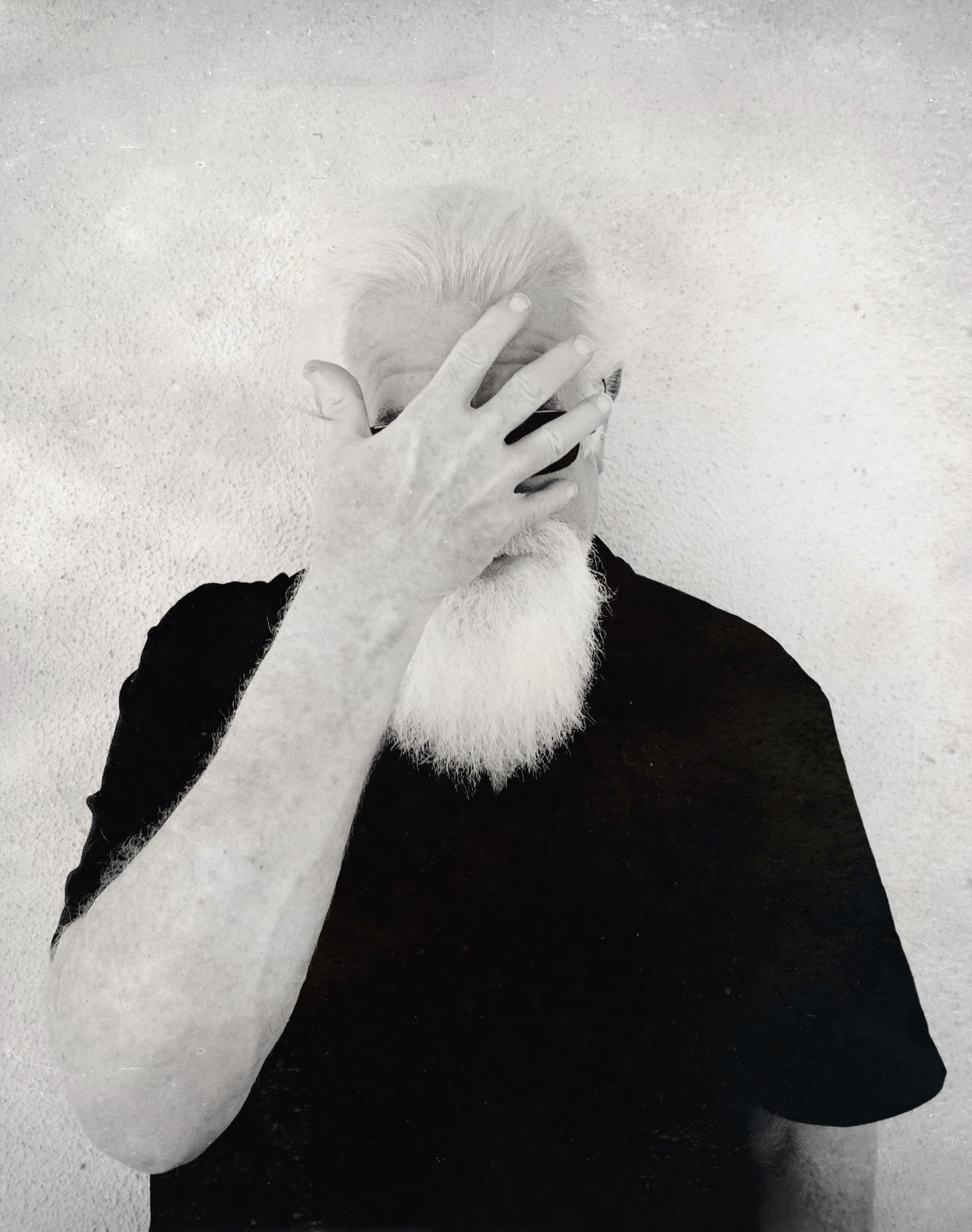
- Born: Jeffrey Kent Ayeroff; January 20, 1947 (age 79); Culver City, California, U.S.
- Education: USC Gould School of Law (JD)
- Occupation: Record executive

Jeffrey Kent Ayeroff (born January 20, 1947) is an American record executive who has worked for A&M, Warner Records, Virgin U.S., Work Group, Apple, and Shangri-La Music. He founded Rock the Vote in 1990 in response to a censorship campaign against artists’ use of explicit language.

== Biography ==
Jeff Ayeroff graduated from USC Gould School of Law in 1971, and worked as an Entertainment Attorney before joining the ranks at A&M Records as an assistant to then-President of the label, Gil Friesen, in 1974. He became A&M's Director of Product Management & Creative Services in 1977 followed by Vice President of Marketing and Creative Services in 1978. At A&M, Ayeroff developed visual campaigns for The Police, Peter Frampton, The Carpenters, and Supertramp, to name a few. Beginning in 1983, his duties as senior vice president of Warner Bros. Records, included overseeing marketing, advertising, creative direction and music videos for artists such as: Madonna, Steve Winwood, ZZ Top, Don Henley, Prince, and Dire Straits. Ayeroff earned two Grammy Award nominations in the category of Grammy Award for Best Recording Package in 1985 and 1986 for his work with A-ha and Talking Heads. He sensed massive potential in the fledgling A-ha and convinced executives at Warner Records to create the iconic music video for "Take On Me", which he himself had conceived. His creative direction on the Stop Making Sense album cover was also included in the Museum of Modern Art exhibition "Making Modern Music: Design For Ear and Eye."

Ayeroff left Warner Records in 1987 and, along with partner Jordan Harris, opened the U.S. label offices for Virgin Records after an invitation from company owner Richard Branson. Ayeroff and Harris signed and marketed an artist roster at Virgin U.S. which included Paula Abdul, Janet Jackson, Lenny Kravitz, The Smashing Pumpkins and others.

During his time at Virgin Records, Ayeroff also founded the progressive-aligned political organization Rock the Vote to help increase voter turnout among voters ages 18 to 24. Through alliances with other Entertainment companies, such as MTV, Ayeroff created commercial and print campaigns with contemporary music artists to appeal to a young voter demographic. The organization supported the National Voter Registration Act of 1993, commonly referred to as the "motor voter" bill, which expanded access to voter registration. It was signed into law by President Bill Clinton. The law requires state governments to offer voter registration opportunities to any eligible person who applies for or renews a driver's license or public assistance. Rock The Vote also protested against the Parents Music Resource Center who, at the time, began advocating for warning labels to be added on covers of music releases that contained profane lyrics. It was reported in 2016 that Rock The Vote had registered more than 6 million voters online.

In August 1993, both Ayeroff & Harris resigned from Virgin Records after the company was sold to Thorn EMI. Industry sources said the resignations were because of a management logjam at the company and the subsequent erosion of their duties.

Ayeroff and Harris went on to co-found Work Group in 1995, a West Coast-based subsidiary of Sony Music, where they developed the careers of Jennifer Lopez, Jamiroquai, Fiona Apple, Len, Sponge, Imperial Drag, and Esthero. In July 1999, both Ayeroff and Harris departed the label six months prior to their contract expiration. Sources cited that both were unhappy with Sony after consolidation of promotion duties for all Epic Records labels under one department, in addition to Sony not allowing Ayeroff and Harris to buy a piece of the company they helped build.

Ayeroff was hired by Apple Records in 2000, as a key consultant to oversee the marketing of 1, a career-spanning retrospective of The Beatles which has sold over 30 million copies worldwide to date.

Returning to the Warner Records in 2001 as the label's chief creative director and vice chairman, he oversaw the visual campaigns for Josh Groban, My Chemical Romance, Green Day, and more. Ayeroff left Warner Bros. in 2004 at the conclusion of his contract.

In 2008, Ayeroff became co-CEO (along with Jon Rubin) of Steve Bing's boutique label imprint Shangri-La Music. Ayeroff and Rubin also began ArtistsFirst, a creative and marketing consulting agency, which has launched international humanitarian activism with its music.

== Selected Credits ==
Year	Album	Artist	Credit
1983	Cuts Like a Knife	Bryan Adams	Art direction
1983	Synchronicity	The Police	Art direction, design
1984	Camouflage	Rod Stewart	Art direction
1984	Kiss the Sky	Jimi Hendrix	Art direction
1984	Like a Virgin	Madonna	Art direction
1984	Stop Making Sense	Talking Heads	Liner notes, writer, design, package design
1985	Done with Mirrors	Aerosmith	Cover art concept
1985	Hunting High and Low	A-Ha	Art direction
1986	Back in the High Life	Steve Winwood	Art direction
1986	Graceland	Paul Simon	Art direction
1986	Parade	Prince & The Revolution	Art direction
1986	True Blue	Madonna	Art direction
1988	Roll With It	Steve Winwood	Art direction, design
1989	Let Love Rule	Lenny Kravitz	Liner notes, art direction
1989	Mystery Girl	Roy Orbison	Art direction
2003	Closer	Josh Groban	Art direction
2007	Instant Karma: The Amnesty International Campaign to Save Darfur	Various artists	Executive producer
2007	Last Man Standing	Jerry Lee Lewis	Executive producer
2012	Chimes of Freedom: The Songs of Bob Dylan	Various artists	Executive producer, art direction

== Awards ==
In 2005, Ayeroff received the Kratz Award for Creative Excellence from The Music Video Producer's Association, an award which recognizes exceptional accomplishments in music video production.
