= List of Madonna tribute albums =

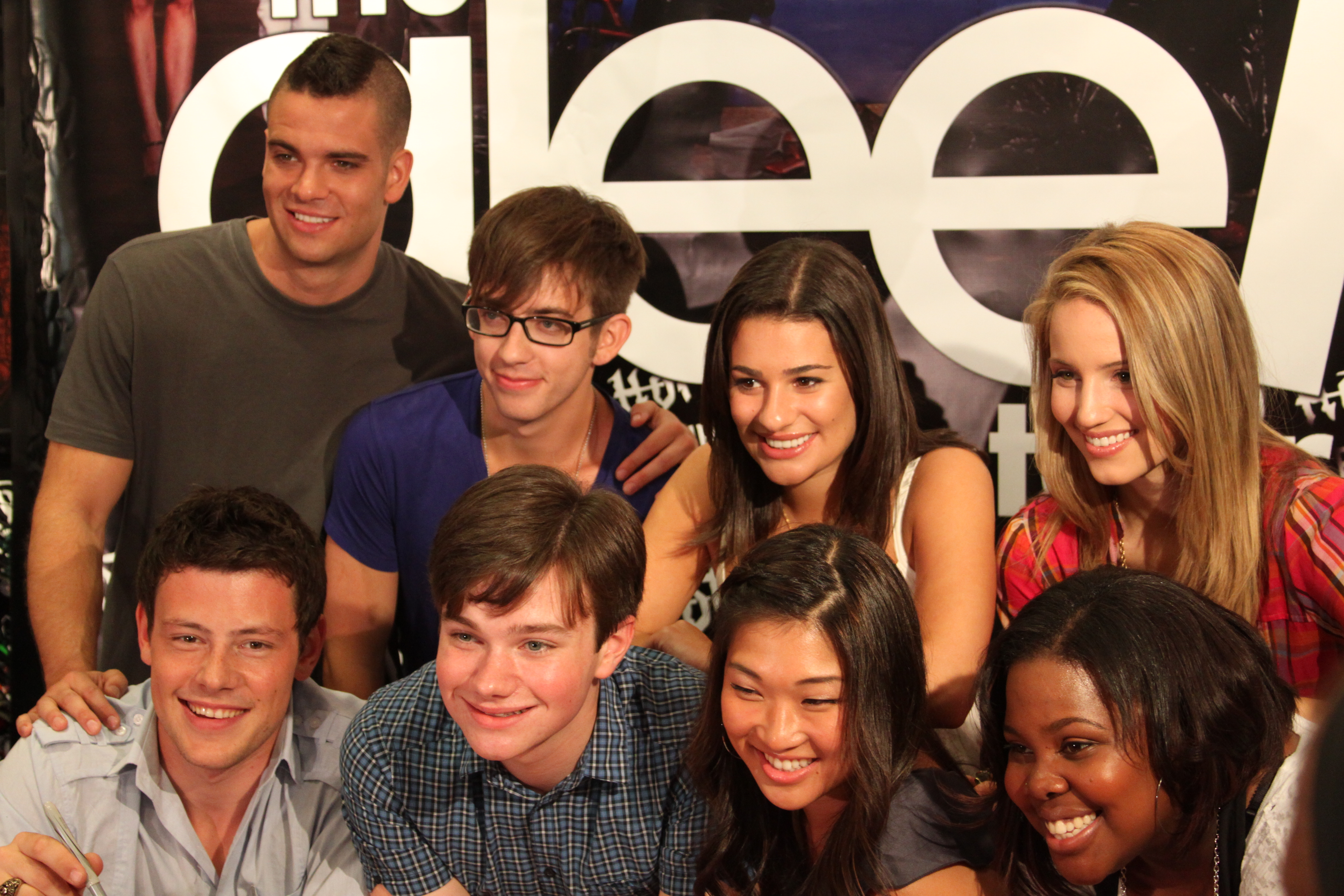
The cast of the TV Series Glee released the EP Glee: The Music, The Power of Madonna in 2010, a tribute album, which received critical appreciation

This is a list of tribute albums dedicated to American singer-songwriter Madonna. Since her debut in the 1980s, diverse artists have made tribute albums to the singer. While she is primarily a pop, dance and electronic artist, her tribute albums have been covered with a wide range of different genres and styles, including instrumental, jazz, children's music and easy listening.

Some artists who have appeared on these albums ranging from Royal Philharmonic Orchestra, Mad'House, and Ariel Pink to The Tyde, Chapin Sisters and Lavender Diamond. Releases have been through major labels such as Universal Music Group and Columbia Records to independent labels such as Cleopatra Records, Cherry Red Records and Manimal Vinyl among others.

Various of the Madonna tribute albums have been reviewed by music critics, receiving both positive and negative comments. Notable releases include to Glee: The Music, The Power of Madonna (2010), Through the Wilderness (2007) and Rockabye Baby! Lullaby Renditions of Madonna (2011) by the series of CDs Rockabye Baby!. In 2011, Paper Bag Records made a remake of her third studio album, True Blue, while Charly Records has released a series of Madonna tribute albums. In 2021, label Italians Do It Better, released a Madonna tribute album. Pitchfork commented, "The Madonna influence is baked into the Italians Do It Better label in more ways than one" (Madonna debuted the phrase "Italians Do It Better" on a T-shirt in the 1986 video for "Papa Don't Preach").

== Tribute albums ==
Title	Album details	List of songs
Dance into the Beat: Madonna Collection	Release: 1995; Label: Strength Records	Songs and performers: "Dance into the Beat" (Medly 1); "Dance into the Beat" (Medly 2); "Dance into the Beat" (Medly 2); "Holiday"; "Into the Groove"; "La Isla Bonita"; "Like a Virgin"; "Papa Don't Preach"; "Material Girl"; "Open Your Heart"
Material Girl: RPO Plays Music of Madonna	Release: 1998; Label: Music Club International Records	Songs and performers: "True Blue"; "La Isla Bonita"; "Papa Don't Preach"; "Like a Prayer"; "Crazy for You"; "This Used to Be My Playground"; "Borderline"; "Into the Groove"; "Like a Virgin"; "Holiday"; "Material Girl"; "Who's That Girl"; Note: by Royal Philharmonic Orchestra
Virgin Voices: A Tribute to Madonna, Vol. 1	Release: 1999; Label: Cleopatra Records	Songs and performers: "Holiday" by Heaven 17; "Like a Prayer" by Loleatta Holloway; "Like a Virgin" by Annabella Lwin; "Why's It So Hard" by Dead or Alive; "Live to Tell" by Berlin; "Vogue" by Astralasia; "Justify My Love" by Front Line Assembly; "Bad Girl" by Boy George, Amanda Ghost, and James Hardway; "Material Girl" by KMFDM; "Bedtime Story" by Silverbeam; "Express Yourself" by Information Society; "Swim" by Spahn Ranch; "Frozen" by Gene Loves Jezebel; "Burning Up" by The Voluptuous Horror of Karen Black
The Music of Madonna	Release: 1999; Label: Intersound, First Choice	Songs and performers: "Express Yourself"; "Holiday"; "Crazy for You"; "Like a Prayer"; "Get into the Groove"; "La Isla Bonita"; "Swim"; "Like a Virgin"; "Cherish"; "The Power of Good-Bye"; Note: by Spectrum Orchestra
Truly Blue: Tribute to Madonna	Release: 2000; Label: Dressed To Kill	Songs and performers: "Bad Girl" by Semi Moore; "Oh Father" by Killer Nannies In America; "Borderline" by Kronos; "Lucky Star" by Sperm Bank; "Causing a Commotion" by Dog Breath Sue; "Holiday" by Nut Barz; "Dress You Up" by Klannad; "True Blue" by Kylie Minow; "Rescue Me" by Knew Order; "Into the Groove" by Abdominal Snowman; "Papa Don't Preach" by The Provos; "Keep It Together" by Bluenotes; "Open Your Heart" by Klark Klent; "La Isla Bonita" by Phil & Grant; "Justify My Love" by Sorcery; "Ray of Light" by Tiff Mitchell; "The Power of Good-Bye" by Swede
Virgin Voices 2000: A Tribute to Madonna	Release: 2000; Label: Cleopatra Records	Songs and performers: "Open Your Heart" by Ofra Haza; "Lucky Star" by Switchblade Symphony; "Ray of Light" by Sigue Sigue Sputnik; "Borderline" Nivek Ogre; "Into the Groove" by Dale Bozzio; "This Used to Be My Playground" by A Flock of Seagulls; "Love Don't Live Here Anymore" by Michelle Crispin; "Rescue Me" by Adeva; "Erotica" by Razed in Black, Transmutator; "Skin" by Mephisto Walz; "Cherish" by Loop Guru; "Rain" by Rosetta Stone; "Deeper and Deeper" by Mark Pistel; "Like a Prayer" by Bigod 20
A Tribute to Madonna: Tranceformed	Release: 2000; Label: Strictly Hype Records (SHR), Colossal	Songs and performers: "Into the Groove"; "Ray of Light"; "Holiday"; "Live to Tell"; "Borderline"; "Vogue"; "Justify My Love"; "Crazy for You"; "Lucky Star"; "Express Yourself"
A Tribute To Madonna Vol 2	Release: 2000; Label: Charly Records	Songs and performers: "Hanky Panky – Sound-A-Like"; "Holiday – Sound-A-Like"; "Crazy For You – Sound-A-Like"; "Cherish – Sound-A-Like"; "Justify My Love – Sound-A-Like"; "Sooner Or Later – Sound-A-Like"; "Material Girl – Sound-A-Like"; "Like A Prayer – Sound-A-Like"; Note: by Studio Group
Plays the Hits Made Famous by Madonna	Release: 2001; Label: Capriccio Records, Delta Distribution	Songs and performers: "La Isla Bonita"; "True Blue"; "Crazy for You"; "Into the Groove"; "Like a Virgin"; "Papa Don't Preach"; "Fever"; "Material Girl"; "Justify My Love"; "Cherish"; Note: by Starsound Orchestra
Tribute to Madonna	Release: 2001; Label: Swift Records	Songs and performers: "Holiday"; "Like a Virgin"; "Material Girl"; "Crazy for You"; "Into the Groove"; "Papa Don't Preach"; "True Blue"; "La Isla Bonita"; "Who's That Girl"; "Like a Prayer"; "Don't Cry for Me Argentina"; "Frozen"; "Ray of Light"; "Drowned World"; "American Pie"; "Music"; Note: by London Studio Orchestra
The String Quartet Tribute to Madonna	Release: 2002; Label: Vitamin Records	Songs and performers: "Ray of Light"; "Material Girl"; "Rain"; "This Used to Be My Playground"; "Papa Don't Preach"; "Beautiful Stranger"; "Live to Tell"; "Like a Prayer"; "Crazy for You"; "Unhinges, for string quartet"; Note: by Da Capo Players
Absolutely Mad	Release: 2002; Label: Universal Music Group	Songs and performers: "Like a Prayer"; "Holiday"; "Into the Groove"; "La Isla Bonita"; "Like a Virgin"; "Vogue"; "Borderline"; "Open Your Heart"; "Papa Don't Preach"; "Be Yourself"; "Everybody"; "Lady of the Dawn"; "Frozen"; "Like a Prayer"; "Like a Prayer"; "Holiday"; Note: by Mad'House
Madonna: The Ultimate Tribute	Release: 2002; Label: Compendia Music Group, Intersound	Songs and performers: "Express Yourself"; "Holiday"; "Crazy for You"; "Like a Prayer"; "Into the Groove"; "La Isla Bonita"; "Swim"; "Like a Virgin"; "Cherish"; "The Power of Good-Bye"
A Tribute to Madonna: Virgin Voices	Release: 2003; Label: Cleopatra Records	Songs and performers Disc 1: "Holiday" by Heaven 17; "Like a Prayer" by Loleatta Holloway; "Like a Virgin" by Annabella Lwin; "Why's It So Hard" by Dead or Alive; "Live to Tell" by Berlin; "Vogue" by Astralasia; "Justify My Love" by Front Line Assembly; "Bad Girl" by Boy George, Amanda Ghost, and James Hardway; "Material Girl" by KMFDM; "Bedtime Story" by Silverbeam; "Express Yourself" by Information Society; "Swim" by Spahn Ranch; "Frozen" by Gene Loves Jezebel; "Burning Up" by The Voluptuous Horror of Karen Black; Disc 2: "Open Your Heart" by Ofra Haza; "Lucky Star" by Switchblade Symphony; "Ray of Light" by Sigue Sigue Sputnik; "Borderline" Nivek Ogre; "Into the Groove" by Dale Bozzio; "This Used to Be My Playground" by A Flock of Seagulls; "Love Don't Live Here Anymore" by Michelle Crispin; "Rescue Me" by Adeva; "Erotica" by Razed in Black, Transmutator; "Skin" by Mephisto Walz; "Cherish" by Loop Guru; "Rain" by Rosetta Stone; "Deeper and Deeper" by Mark Pistel; "Like a Prayer" by Bigod 20
The Dancefloor Tribute to Madonna	Release: 2003; Label: Vitamin Records	Songs and performers: "Don't Tell Me"; "Beautiful Stranger"; "Frozen"; "La Isla Bonita"; "Ray of Light"; "Erotica"; "Music"; "Rain"; "Justify My Love"; "Last Chance"
Material Girls – A Tribute to Madonna	Release: 2003; Label: Klone Records	Songs and performers: "Like a Virgin"; "Material Girl"; "The Look of Love"; "Cherish"; "You'll See"; "Crazy for You"; "Vogue"; "Frozen"; "Erotica"; "This Used to Be My Playground"; "Express Yourself"; "Rain"; "Gambler"; "Live to Tell"; "Hanky Panky"; "Like a Virgin"; "Don't Cry for Me Argentina"; Note: by The Klone Orchestra
Tribute to Madonna: Like a Virgin	Release: 2004; Label: Phantom Import Distribution, Double Pleasure	Songs and performers Disc 1: "Holiday" by Heaven 17; "Like a Prayer" by Loleatta Holloway; "Like a Virgin" by Annabella Lwin; "Why's It So Hard" by Dead or Alive; "Live to Tell" by Berlin; "Vogue" by Astralasia; "Justify My Love" by Front Line Assembly; "Bad Girl" by Boy George, Amanda Ghost, and James Hardway; "Material Girl" by KMFDM; "Bedtime Story" by Silverbeam; "Express Yourself" by Information Society; "Swim" by Spahn Ranch; "Frozen" by Gene Loves Jezebel; "Burning Up" by The Voluptuous Horror of Karen Black; Disc 2: "Open Your Heart" by Ofra Haza; "Lucky Star" by Switchblade Symphony; "Ray of Light" by Sigue Sigue Sputnik; "Borderline" Nivek Ogre; "Into the Groove" by Dale Bozzio; "This Used to Be My Playground" by A Flock of Seagulls; "Love Don't Live Here Anymore" by Michelle Crispin; "Rescue Me" by Adeva; "Erotica" by Razed in Black, Transmutator; "Skin" by Mephisto Walz; "Cherish" by Loop Guru; "Rain" by Rosetta Stone; "Deeper and Deeper" by Mark Pistel; "Like a Prayer" by Bigod 20
Immaculate Deception: A Tribute to the Music of Madonna	Release: 2004; Label: Delirium Records	Songs and performers: "Burning Up" by Drag; "Material Girl" by The Toast; "Frozen" by Doom Kounty Electric Chair; "Into the Groove" by Statica; "Hanky Panky" by Relatives by Appointment; "Dress You Up" by Lift Off; "Music/Ray of Light" by; "Bad Girl" by Cruzer; "Like a Prayer" by Wirebox; "Justify My Love" by The Put-On's; "Live to Tell" by Mega Manic; "Borderline" by Hoodlumz
Tribute to Madonna (Golden Sun)	Release: 2005; Label: Golden Sound	Songs and performers: "Music"; "Like a Prayer"; "Into the Groove"; "Material Girl"; "Lucky Star"; "Holiday"; "Die Another Day"; "Like a Virgin"; "Beautiful Stranger"; "Erotica"; "American Pie"; "The Power of Good-Bye"; Note: by Adam Marano
A Tribute to the Greatest Hits of Madonna	Release: 2005; Label: Prism Entertainment	Songs and performers: "American Life"; "Die Another Day"; "Music"; "American Pie"; "Beautiful Stranger"; "The Power of Good-Bye"; "Ray of Light"; "Frozen"; "Don't Cry for Me Argentina"; "This Used to Be My Playground"; "Vogue"; "Who's That Girl"; "La Isla Bonita"; "Papa Don't Preach"; "Borderline"; "Material Girl"; "Like a Virgin"; "Holiday"; Note: by Angelina
The Music of Madonna	Release: 2005; Label: Millennium Records	Songs and performers: "Music"; "American Pie"; "American Life"; "Hollywood"; "Beautiful Stranger"; "La Isla Bonita"; "Papa Don't Preach"; "Like a Virgin"; "Holiday"; "Don't Cry for Me Argentina"; "Die Another Day"; "Frozen"; "Vogue"; "Like a Prayer"; "Borderline"; "Material Girl"; Note: by Brook Barros
The Electronic Tribute to Madonna	Release: 2005; Label: Vitamin Records	Songs and performers: "American Life"; "Beautiful Stranger"; "Frozen"; "Vogue"; "Don't Tell Me"; "Ray of Light"; "Bedtime Story"; "Like a Prayer"; "Express Yourself"; "Erotica"; "Hollywood"; "Justify My Love"
Rock-A-Bye: Madonna	Release: 2005; Label: Turn Up the Music	Songs and performers: "Cherish (The Thought)"; "(I'm) Crazy for You"; "Open Your Heart (To Me Baby)"; "(Over The) Borderline"; "Material Girl"; "Dress You Up (In My Love)"; "Holiday (Celebrate)"; "(You Must Be My) Lucky Star"; "La Isla Bonita (Last Night I Dreamt of San Pedro)"; "Vogue"; Note: by Hit Crew
A Smooth Sax Tribute to Madonna's Greatest Hits	Release: 2005; Label: Tribute Sounds	Songs and performers: "This Used to Be My Playground"; "Take a Bow"; "Papa Don't Preach"; "Open Your Heart"; "Live to Tell"; "Like a Prayer"; "Express Yourself"; "Crazy for You"; "Cherish"; "Borderline"; Note: by Bennett Carl
Dance Tribute to Madonna	Release: 2006; Label: ZYX Music	Songs and performers: "Sorry"; "Music"; "Hung Up"; "American Pie"; "Nothing Really Matters"; "Holiday"; "The Power of Good-Bye"; "Die Another Day"; "Like a Prayer"; "Frozen"; "Into the Groove"; "Lucky Star"; "Like a Virgin"; "Material Girl"; Note: by The Mysterious Girl
The Worlds Greatest 80's Tribute to Madonna	Release: 2006; Label: Redline Records, Cleopatra Records	Songs and performers: "Justify My Love" by Front Line Assembly; "Open Your Heart" by Ofra Haza; "Lucky Star" by Switchblade Symphony; "Borderline" by Nivek Ogre; "Into the Groove" by Missing Persons; "This Used to Be My Playground" by A Flock of Seagulls; "Like a Prayer" by Bigod 20; "Holiday" by Heaven 17; "Like a Virgin" by Bow Wow Wow; "Why It's So Hard" by Dead or Alive; "Live to Tell" by Berlin; "Bad Girl" by Boy George, Amanda Ghost, and James Hardway
The Music of Madonna: A Tribute Performed By Studio 99	Release: 2006; Label: Going For A Song	Songs and performers: "American Pie"; "Ray of Light"; "Frozen"; "Beautiful Stranger"; "Lucky Star"; "Borderline"; "Cherish"; "Crazy for You"; "Holiday"; "Into the Groove"; "La Isla Bonita"; "Like a Prayer"; "Material Girl"; "Open Your Heart"; "Papa Don't Preach"; "True Blue"; "Vogue"; Note: by Studio 99
Tribute to Madonna	Release: 2006; Label: Red Sauce	Songs and performers: "Holiday"; "Like a Virgin"; "Material Girl"; "Crazy for You"; "Into the Groove"; "Papa Don't Preach"; "True Blue"; "La Isla Bonita"; "Who's That Girl"; "Like a Prayer"; "Don't Cry for Me Argentina"; "Frozen"; "Ray of Light"; "Drowned World"; "American Pie"; "Music"; Note: by Madge
Tribute to Madonna (Membran)	Release: 2006; Label: MSI Music Distribution, Membran	Songs and performers: "Music"; "Holiday"; "Like a Prayer"; "Like a Virgin"; "La Isla Bonita"; "Who's That Girl"; "Frozen"; "Into the Groove"; "Material Girl"; "Open Your Heart"; "Beautiful Stranger"; "Cherish"; "Crazy for You"; "American Pie"; "Papa Don't Preach"; "Express Yourself"; Note: by Madonna Tribute Band
Through the Wilderness: Tribute to Madonna	Release: 2007; Label: Manimal Vinyl	Songs and performers: "La Isla Bonita" by Jonathan Wilson; "Into the Groove" by Jeremy Jay; "Beautiful Stranger" by Golden Animals; "Live to Tell by Winter Flowers; "Material Girl" by Mountain Party; "Everybody" by Ariel Pink; "Oh Father" by Giant Drag; "Hung Up" por The Tyde; "Lucky Star" by Alexandra Hope; "Borderline" by Chapin Sisters; "Dress You Up" by Apollo Heights; "Who's That Girl" por The Bubonic Plague; "Cherish" by The Prayers; "Crazy for You by Lion of Panjshir; "Like a Prayer" by Lavender Diamond; "Holiday" by Siddhartha; "Impressive Instant" by Pangaeans
Plays Madonna in Jazz	Release: 2007; Label: Cinedelic Records	Songs and performers: "La Isla Bonita"; "Holiday"; "Into the Groove"; "Frozen"; "Material Girl"; "Paradise Is Not for Me"; "La Castidad"; "Papa Don't Preach"; "Impressive Instant"; "Music"; "Like a Virgin"; "La Castidad [Scat Vocal Edit]"; Note: by Bo.Dá
Strung out on Madonna: The String Quartet Tribute	Release: 2008; Label: Vitamin Records	Songs and performers: "Ray of Light"; "Material Girl"; "Rain"; "This Used to Be My Playground"; "Papa Don't Preach"; "Beautiful Stranger"; "Live to Tell"; "Like a Prayer"; "Crazy for You"; "Unhinges, for string quartet"; Note: Da Capo Players
Madonna: The Immaculate Tribute	Release: 2008; Label: Cannon House	Songs and performers: "Like a Prayer"; "Papa Don't Preach"; "Oh Father"; "Like a Virgin"; "Live to Tell"; "Crazy for You"; "Beautiful Stranger"; "La Isla Bonita"; "Express Yourself"; "Fever"; "Borderline"; "Holiday"; "Material Girl"; "Don't Cry for Me Argentina"
Madonna Cool Down Experience Part 1	Release: 2008; Label: One Trybal	Songs and performers: "Hung Up"; "Rescue Me"; "Music"; "Beautiful Stranger"; "Don't Tell Me"; "Like a Virgin"; "I'll Remember"; "Into the Groove"; "Sorry"; "Fly to Sky"; "Mistery Soul"; "The Megamix"; Note: by The Sunset Lounge Orchestra
Madonna Cool Down Experience Part 2	Release: 2008; Label: One Trybal	Songs and performers: "Frozne"; "Like a Prayer"; "Holiday"; "La Isla Bonita"; "Who's That Girl"; "Jump"; "You'll See"; "Live to Tell"; "Erotica"; "Sorry"; "Africanism Look"; "Elegant Day"; "The Megamix"; Note: by The Sunset Lounge Orchestra
The Tune Robbers Play the Best of Madonna, Vol. 1	Release: 2008; Label: Rosenklang	Songs and performers: "Who's That Girl"; "Holiday"; "Borderline"; "Like a Prayer"; "Like a Virgin"; "Material Girl"; "Crazy for You"; "The Look of Love"; "Into the Groove"; "Dress You Up"; "Gambler"; "Live to Tell"; "Papa Don't Preach"; "True Blue"; "La Isla Bonita"; Note: by Tune Robbers
Tribute to Madonna (ZYX Music)	Release: 2008; Label: ZYX Music	Songs and performers: "Music" by Clueless; "Like a Prayer" by Absolutely Fantastic; "Get into the Groove" by Absolutely Fantastic; "Material Girl" by Absolutely Fantastic; "Lucky Star" by Absolutely Fantastic; "Holiday" by Absolutely Fantastic; "Die Another Day" by Clueless; "Like a Virgin" by Absolutely Fantastic; "Erotica" by Clueless; "Dress You Up" by Absolutely Fantastic
Forever Madonna	Release: 2008; Label: Rumour Records	Songs and performers Disc 1: "Frozen"; "La Isla Bonita"; "Rain"; "Live to Tell"; "Crazy for You"; "Secret"; "This Used to Be My Playground"; "Take a Bow"; "Love Don't Live Here Anymore"; "Into the Groove"; Disc 2: "Secret" (Klubkidz House Party Mix); "La Isla Bonita" (Klubkidz House Party Mix); "Into the Groove" (Klubkidz House Party Mix); "Live to Tell" (Klubkidz House Party Mix); "This Used to Be My Playground" (Klubkidz House Party Mix); "Frozen" (Klubkidz House Party Mix); "Rain" (Klubkidz House Party Mix); "Crazy for You" (Klubkidz House Party Mix); "Love Don't Live Here Anymore" (Klubkidz House Party Mix); Note: by Melissa Totten
A Tribute To Madonna Vol 1	Release: 2009; Label: One Media Publishing	Songs and performers: "Bad Girl"; "Oh Father"; "Borderline"; "Lucky Star"; "Causing a Commotion"; "Holiday"; "Dress You Up"; "True Blue"; "Rescue Me"; "Into the Groove"; "Papa Don't Preach"; "Keep It Together"; "Open Your Heart"; "La Isla Bonita"; "Justify My Love"; "Ray of Light"; "The Power of Good-Bye"; Note: by Strike A Pose
A Tribute To Madonna Vol 2	Release: 2009; Label: One Media Publishing	Songs and performers: "Like a Virgin"; "Material Girl"; "The Look of Love"; "Cherish"; "You'll See"; "Crazy for You"; "Vogue"; "Frozen"; "Erotica"; "This Used to Be My Playground"; "Express Yourself"; "Rain"; "Gambler"; "Live to Tell"; "Hanky Panky"; "Like a Prayer"; "Don't Cry for Me Argentina"; Note: by Strike A Pose
Tribute To Madonna, Vol. 2	Release: 2009; Label: Charly Records	Songs and performers: "Like a Virgin"; "Material Girl"; "The Look of Love"; "Chrish"; "You'll See"; "Crazy for You"; "Vogue"; "Frozen"; "Erotica"; "This Used to Be My Playground"; "Express Yourself"; "Rain"; "Gambler"; "Live to Tell"; "Hanky Panky"; "Like a Prayer"; "Don't Cry for Me Argentina"; Note: by Madonna Tribute Band
Glee: The Music, The Power of Madonna	Release: 2010; Label: Columbia Records	Songs and performers: "Express Yourself" by Dianna Agron, Jonathan Groff, Lea Michele, Amber Riley, and Naya Rivera; "Borderline/Open Your Heart" by Lea Michele and Cory Monteith; "Vogue" by Chris Colfer, Jane Lynch, and Amber Riley; "Like a Virgin" by Jayma Mays, Matthew Morrison, Jonathan Groff, Lea Michele, Cory Monteith, and Naya Rivera; "4 Minutes" by Chris Colfer and Amber Riley; "What It Feels Like for a Girl" by Chris Colfer, Kevin McHale, Cory Monteith, and Mark Salling; "Like a Prayer" by Chris Colfer, Jonathan Groff, Lea Michele, Cory Monteith, and Amber Riley
Bossa N' Madonna	Release: 2010; Label: Music Brokers	Songs and performers: "The Virgin Intro" by DJ Leão; "Material Girl (Celebration Mix)" by United Rhythms Of Brazil; "Live To Tell (Tropical Hop 12" Edit)" by Nova Bossa Ltd; "Into The Groove" by Banda Do Sul and Natascha; "Hollywood (Vinyl Mix)" por Glambeats Corp; "Like A Virgin" by Brazil XXI meets Silvinha Santana; "Lucky Star (Lonely Heart Version)" by Jingo; "Holiday (Rhodes Edit)" by São Vicente and Natalie Renoir; "Ray Of Light" by Deise Costa & Os Digitalistas; "Hung Up" by Groove Da Praia; "Express Yourself (Unplugged Midsummer Mix)" by Amazonics; "Vogue" by Sixth Finger, Maira, and Zoca
The Tune Robbers Play the Best of Madonna, Vol. 2	Release: 2010; Label: Rosenklang	Songs and performers: "Hung Up"; "One More Chance"; "Love Don't Live Here Anymore"; "Beautiful Stranger"; "Don't Cry for Me Argentina"; "Frozen"; "The Power of Good-Bye"; "Nothing Really Matters"; "American Pie"; "Music"; "Don't Tell Me"; "What It Feels Like for a Girl"; "Amazing"; "Die Another Day"; "Miles Away"; Note: by Tune Robbers
A Tribute to Madonna: Material Girls	Release: 2010; Label: Cherry Red Records	Songs and performers: "Like a Virgin"; "Material Girl"; "The Look of Love"; "Cherish"; "You'll See"; "Crazy for You"; "Vogue"; "Frozen"; "Erotica"; "This Used to Be My Playground"; "Express Yourself"; "Rain"; "Gambler"; "Live to Tell"; "Hanky Panky"; "Like a Virgin"; "Don't Cry for Me Argentina"; Note: by Material Girls
Rockabye Baby! Lullaby Renditions of Madonna	Release: 2011; Label: Rockabye Baby!	Songs and performers: "Lucky Star"; "Material Girl"; "Like a Virgin"; "Ray of Light"; "Express Yourself"; "Vogue"; "Papa Don't Preach"; "Into the Groove"; "Holiday"; "Like a Prayer"; "Borderline"; "Crazy for You"; Note: by Steven Charles Boone
Paper Bag Records is True Blue	Release: 2011; Label: Paper Bag Records	Songs and performers: "Papa Don't Preach" by Woodhands; "Open Your Heart" by Young Galaxy; "White Heat" by The Acorn; "Live to Tell" by The Rural Alberta Advantage (We're Scared Version); "Where's the Party" by PS I Love You; "True Blue" by Winter Gloves; "La Isla Bonita" by Laura Barrett; "Jimmy Jimmy" by Born Ruffians; "Love Makes The World Go Round" by You Say Party
Multi Karaoke – Backing Force Tribute To Madonna	Release: 2011; Label: Intermezzo, Mult Karaoke	Songs and performers: "You'll See (Karaoke)"; "Who's That Girl (Karaoke)"; "This Used to Be My Playground (Karaoke)"; "Material Girl (Karaoke)"; "Borderline (Karaoke)"; "La isla bonita (Karaoke)"; "Papa Don't Preach (Karaoke)"; "Holiday (Karaoke)"; "You'll See (Multiplex Version)"; "Who's That Girl (Multiplex Version)"; "This Used to Be My Playground (Multiplex Version)"; "Material Girl (Multiplex Version)"; "Borderline (Multiplex Version)"; "La isla bonita (Multiplex Version)"; "Papa Don't Preach (Multiplex Version)"; "Holiday (Multiplex Version)"; Note: by Backing Force
Tribute to Madonna, Vol. 1	Release: 2011; Label: RingRise	Songs and performers: "Erotica"; "Frozen"; "Die Another Day"; "Like a Virgin"; "Into the Groove"; "[Don't] Tell Me"; "La Isla Bonita"; "Music"; "Live to Tell"; "Hung Up"; Note: by The Ringtones
The Madonna Story Part 1	Release: 2011; Label: Charly Records	Songs and performers: "This Used to Be My Playground"; "Crazy for You"; "Express Yourself"; "Holiday"; "La Isla Bonita"; "Like a Virgin"; "Papa Don't Preach"; "Material Girl"; "Like a Prayer"; "True Blue"; "Who's That Girl"; "Vogue"; "Open Your Heart"; "Into the Groove"; "Hanky Panky"; "Dress You Up"; Note: The Gary Tesca Orchestra
Greatest Hits from the Superstars! (Who's That Girl)	Release: 2011; Label: Pyramid Music	Songs and performers: "Who's That Girl"; "Like a Virgin"; "Like a Prayer"; "Into the Groove"; "Open Your Heart"; "Express Yourself"; "Holiday"; "This Used to Be My Playground"; "Material Girl"; "True Blue"; "Crazy for You"; "Vogue"; "Papa Don't Preach"; "Hanky Panky"; "La Isla Bonita"; "Dress You Up"; "Borderline"; Note: by The Gary Tesca Orchestra
We Love Madonna: The Dance Tribute	Release: 2011; Label: The Saifam Group Digital	Songs and performers: "Like a Virgin (The Factory Happy Mix)" by The Snapper; "Express Yourself (A.R. Remix)" by In.Deep; "Celebration (A.R. Remix)" by In.Deep; "Who's That Girl (The Factory Team Remix)" by Kate Project; "Holiday (A.R. Remix)" by In.Deep; "Hung Up" by In.Deep; "Vogue Avec Chic (Extended Mix)" by In.Deep; "Give It 2 Me (The BJ Remix)" by In.Deep; "Open Your Heart" by In.Deep; "Revolver (M. B. Remix)" by In.Deep; "American Life (Factory Team Remix)" by In.Deep; "Get into the Groove (Factory Team Remix)" by Bandido; "Beautiful Stranger" by In.Deep; "Music" by In.Deep; "American Pie (Def-In-Mix)" by In.Deep; "Die Another Day" by In.Deep; "Frozen (Sensibility Mix)" by In.Deep; "The Power of Goodbye (Club Mix)" by In.Deep; "Don't Tell Me (Def-In-RMX)" by Raffa; "What It Feels Like for a Girl (Dance Mix)" by In.Deep; "Miles Away (The Factory Team Remix)" by In.Deep; "Like a Prayer (Dance Mix)" by Raffa; "Jump (Dead Mix)" by In.Deep; "Dress You Up (A.R. Remix)" by In.Deep; "Liquid Love (R. P. Mix)" by In.Deep
Forbidden Love – Tribute To Madonna	Release: 2012; Label: Pony Canyon, Venus Records	Songs and performers: "La Isla Bonita"; "Forbidden Love"; "Frozen"; "Deeper and Deeper"; "Get Together"; "Take a Bow"; "Don't Cry for Me Argentina"; "Secret"; "Human Nature"; "Cherish"; "Like a Virgin"; "Borderline"; "You'll See"; Note: by John DiMartino
Dance tribute to Madonna	Release: 2012; Label: Cc Entertainment	Songs and performers: "Give Me All Your Luvin'"; "Material Girl"; "Like a Prayer"; "Ray of Light"; "Hung Up"; "Borderline"; "Holiday"; "4 Minutes"; "Like a Virgin"; "Vogue"; "La Isla Bonita"; Note: by Cover All Stars
Like a Virgin	Release: 2012; Label: The Orchard, Open Records	Songs and performers: "Like a Virgin"; "Who's That Girl"; "Holiday"; "Material Girl"; "Express Yourself"; "Into the Groove"; "Erotica"; "Like a Prayer"; "Sorry"; "Papa Don't Preach"; "True Blue"; "Causing a Commotion"; "Open Your Heart"; "Over and Over"; "The Look of Love"; "Live to Tell"; "Frozen"; "Love Don't Live Here Anymore"; "Physical Attraction"; Note: by Sussan Kameron
Girls on Film: Tribute To The Music Of Madonna	Release: 2012; Label: Adapta	Songs and performers: "Frozen"; "Live to Tell"; "La Isla Bonita"; "True Blue"; "Like a Virgin"; "Holiday"; "Erotica"; "What It Feels Like for a Girl"; "Music"
MCP Performs Madonna: Rebel Heart	Release: 2015; Label: Cc Entertainment	Songs and performers: "Living for Love" Instrumental; "Devil Pray" Instrumental; "Ghosttown" Instrumental; "Unapologetic Bitch" Instrumental; "Illuminati" Instrumental; "Bitch I'm Madonna" Instrumental; "Hold Tight" Instrumental; "Joan of Arc" Instrumental; "Iconic" Instrumental; "HeartBreakCity" Instrumental; "Body Shop" (Instrumental); "Holy Water" Instrumental; "Inside Out" Instrumental; "Wash All Over Me" Instrumental
MCP Performs the Ultimate Madonna Playlist (Instrumental)	Release: 2019; Label: Cc Entertainment	Songs and performers: "Angel" Instrumental; "Beautiful Stranger" Instrumental; "Bitch I'm Madonna" Instrumental; "Borderline" Instrumental; "Cherish" Instrumental; "Crave" Instrumental; "Crazy for You" Instrumental; "Die Another Day" Instrumental; "Don't Cry for Me Argentina" Instrumental; "Don't Tell Me" Instrumental; "Express Yourself" Instrumental; "4 Minutes" Instrumental; "Frozen" Instrumental; "Ghosttown" Instrumental; "Holiday" Instrumental; "Hung Up" Instrumental; "I'll Remember" Instrumental; "Into the Hollywood Groove" Instrumental; "Joan of Arc" Instrumental; "La Isla Bonita" Instrumental; "Like a Prayer" Instrumental; "Like a Virgin" Instrumental; "Live to Tell" Instrumental; "Living for Love" Instrumental; "Material Girl" Instrumental; "Medellín" Instrumental; "Music" Instrumental; "Open Your Heart" Instrumental; "Papa Don't Preach" Instrumental; "The Power of Good-Bye" Instrumental; "Rain" Instrumental; "Ray of Light" Instrumental; "Secret" Instrumental; "Something to Remember" Instrumental; "Take a Bow"Instrumental; "This Used to Be My Playground" Instrumental; "True Blue" Instrumental; "Vogue" Instrumental; "Who's That Girl" Instrumental; "You'll See" Instrumental
Italians Do It Better	Release: 2021; Label: Italians Do It Better	Songs and performers: "Papa Don't Preach"; "Angel"; "Holiday"; "Hollywood"; "Gang Bang"; "Like a Virgin"; "Lucky Star; "Frozen"; "Into the Groove"; "Hung Up"; "La Isla Bonita"; "Beautiful Stranger"; "Material Girl"; "I'm Addicted"; "Crazy for You; "Justify My Love"; "Like a Prayer"; "What It Feels Like for a Girl"; "Burning Up; "Borderline"; Note: By various artists from 10 countries

== See also ==
- Madonna, an album of covers in Hindi-language from Alisha Chinai
- List of cover versions of Madonna songs, a selected list of covers versions of her songs
