= List of cover versions of Madonna songs =

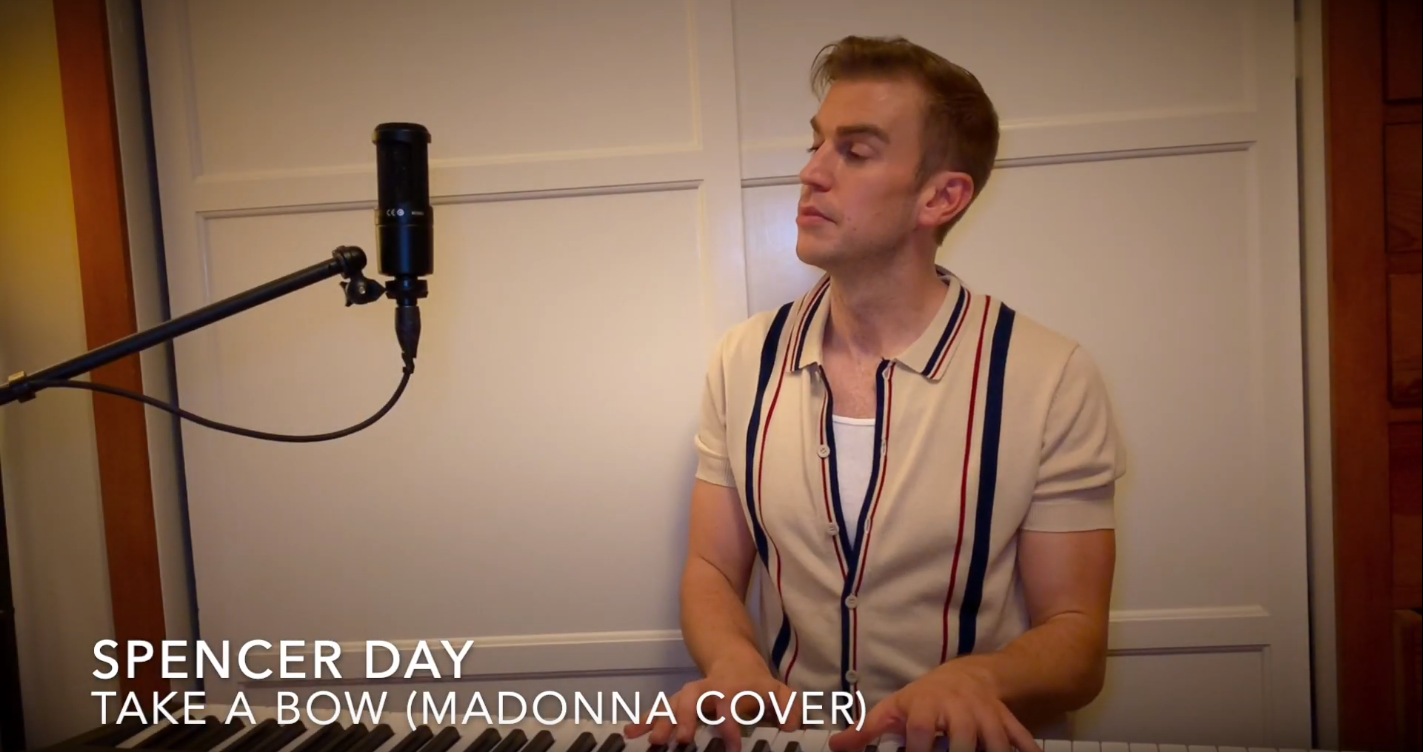
Spencer Day singing his cover version of "Take a Bow"

Various musical artists have recorded covers of one or more songs written and recorded by American singer and songwriter Madonna. (Note: This article does not contain the media appearances, parodies, namechecking and other cultural depictions of Madonna singles. Covers of Madonna's cover versions of songs by other artists – such as "Fever" by Little Willie John and "American Pie" by Don McLean – are not included in this list. Despite that, many followed Madonna style interpretation of her covers; including "Santa Baby", with Caroline Framke from The A.V. Club saying "Madonna's infantilized-Lolita take was the catalyst for the explosion of covers and parodies that followed".) Many began covering her songs since her debut in the 1980s. These covers are in several different languages and genres, and some have received positive reviews from music critics and featured on record charts.

With regard to being a source of numerous covers, Mayer Nissim of Digital Spy stated, that "her influence has spread like a spider web into the wider (and weirder) world of music". Similarly, Guinness World Records listed Madonna as the most remixed and sampled act, arguing, that "is a testament to just how incredibly influential she is". With covers from Glee: The Music, The Power of Madonna entering into Billboard charts in 2012, Gary Trust from the magazine said, that "Madonna's songs have found a place atop a Billboard ranking even when she's not singing them", adding also, that this reinforces, that her music "continues to reign among each new generation".

A subject of diverse listicles, media outlets, such as Paste, StyleCaster, Rolling Stone, Digital Spy, and Stereogum have created best-of lists covers of Madonna songs. Writing for The Guardian, Peter Robinson noticed several covers made by male musicians, including Marilyn Manson, Marc Almond, KMFDM and Teenage Fanclub. One of the most commercially successful releases is the version of "Like a Prayer" by Mad'House, which marked the debut of the band and sold 2 million copies throughout Europe according to Dutch agent Jan Vis; in France alone, Charts in France reported sales of 326,000 copies as of 2014. Similarly, singers Kelly Osbourne ("Papa Don't Preach") and Cristina Scuccia ("Like a Virgin") made their musical debut covering a Madonna song. In 2023, the staff of Rolling Stone placed Miley Cyrus's rendition of "Like a Prayer" among her best 50 songs.

== Key ==
Denotes Madonna related tribute albums or other tribute.
Denotes a single release that charted.

== Selected list ==
Artist	Country of origin	First Year of Appearance	Song	Appearance(s)	Note(s)
2NE1	South Korea	2012	"Like a Virgin"	Collection	
Abi Carter	United States	2024	"Like a Prayer"	Live performance at Honda Center during D23's Disney Experiences Showcase	
Adam Lambert	United States	2012	"Ray of Light"	VH1 Divas	
Adam Lambert	United States	2012	"Into the Groove"	VH1 Divas	
Adam Pally	United States	2012	"Like a Prayer"	Happy Endings episode "Four Weddings and a Funeral (Minus Three Weddings and a Funeral)"	
Adeva	United States	2000	"Rescue Me"	Virgin Voices 2000: A Tribute to Madonna	
Adriana Calcanhotto	Brazil	2002	"Music"	Cantada	
A Flock of Seagulls	United Kingdom	2000	"This Used to Be My Playground"	Virgin Voices 2000: A Tribute to Madonna	
Agoney	Spain	2022	"Frozen"	Libertad Tour	
Alex Greenwald	United States	1999	"Dress You Up"	For Gap's "Everybody in Vests" TV commercial	
Alexandra Stan	Romania	2017	"Like a Virgin"	−	
Alizée	France	2003, 2008	"La Isla Bonita"	Performer shows in 2003, and Psychédélices (2008)	
All Saints	United Kingdom	2016	"Like a Prayer"	BBC Radio 2's Sounds of the 80s Volume 2 (2016)	
Amber Riley	United States	2010	"Express Yourself"	Glee: The Music, The Power of Madonna	
Amber Riley	United States	2010	"Vogue"	Glee: The Music, The Power of Madonna	
Amber Riley	United States	2010	"Like a Prayer"	Glee: The Music, The Power of Madonna	
Amber Riley	United States	2010	"4 Minutes"	Glee: The Music, The Power of Madonna	
Annabella Lwin	Burma (Myanmar)	1999	"Like a Virgin"	Virgin Voices: A Tribute to Madonna, Vol. 1	
Apollo Heights	United States	2007	"Dress You Up"	Through the Wilderness: Tribute to Madonna	
Ariel Pink	United States	2007	"Everybody"	Through the Wilderness: Tribute to Madonna	
Ashleigh Murray	United States	2019	"Sooner or Later"	Riverdale: Season 3 (Original Television Soundtrack), Episode : "Chapter Forty-Six: The Red Dahlia"	
Bebi Dol	Serbia	1995	"Take a Bow" (Like "Pokloni Se...")	Ritam Srca	
Berlin	United States	1999	"Live to Tell"	Virgin Voices: A Tribute to Madonna, Vol. 1	
Beth Ditto	United States	2011	"Vogue"	Live	
Bigod 20	Germany	2000	"Like a Prayer"	Virgin Voices 2000: A Tribute to Madonna	
Bill Frisell	United States	1992	"Live to Tell"	Have a Little Faith	
Birdy	United Kingdom	2014	"Lucky Star"	BBC Radio 2's Sounds of the 80s (2014)	
Boy George	United Kingdom	1999	"Bad Girl"	Virgin Voices: A Tribute to Madonna, Vol. 1	
Britney Spears	United States	1999	"Material Girl"	Performer shows in ...Baby One More Time Tour	
Britney Spears	United States	1999	"Vogue"	Performer shows in ...Baby One More Time Tour	
Britney Spears	United States	2011	"Burning Up"	Performer shows in Femme Fatale Tour	
Capital Cities	United States	2014	"Holiday"	Holiday	
Carol Welsman	Canada	2007	"Live to Tell"	Carol Welsman	
Caroline Loeb	France	2007, 2009	"Like a Virgin"	Crime Parfait (2007), Mistinguett, Madonna et Moi (2009)	
Chapin Sisters	United States	2007	"Borderline"	Through the Wilderness: Tribute to Madonna	
City of Prague Philharmonic Orchestra	Czech Republic	2006	"Die Another Day"	The Ultimate James Bond Film Music Collection	
Cory Monteith	Canada	2010	"Borderline/Open Your Heart"	Glee: The Music, The Power of Madonna	
Cory Monteith	Canada	2010	"Like a Virgin"	Glee: The Music, The Power of Madonna	
Cory Monteith	Canada	2010	"What It Feels Like for a Girl"	Glee: The Music, The Power of Madonna	
Cory Monteith	Canada	2010	"Like a Prayer"	Glee: The Music, The Power of Madonna	
Chris Cantada (Sponge Cola)	Philippines	2004	"Material Girl"	New Horizon	
Chris Colfer	United States	2010	"Vogue"	Glee: The Music, The Power of Madonna	
Chris Colfer	United States	2010	"4 Minutes"	Glee: The Music, The Power of Madonna	
Chris Colfer	United States	2010	"What It Feels Like for a Girl"	Glee: The Music, The Power of Madonna	
Chris Colfer	United States	2010	"Like a Prayer"	Glee: The Music, The Power of Madonna	
Chris Colfer	United States	2012	"I'll Remember"	Glee: The Music, The Graduation Album	
Chris Colfer	United States	2013	"Into the Groove"	Puppet Master episode, season 5	
Cristina Scuccia	Italy	2014	"Like a Virgin"	The Voice of Italy / Sister Cristina	
Counting Crows	United States	2003/2009	"Borderline"	Performed at the Royal Albert Hall in 2003	
Dale Bozzio	United States	2000	"Into the Groove"	Virgin Voices 2000: A Tribute to Madonna	
Danni Carlos	Brazil	2004	"Like a Prayer"	Live	
Danni Carlos	Brazil	2005	"Secret"	Rock 'n' Road All Night	
Darren Criss	United States	2012	"Dress You Up"	Fashion's Night Out 2012 PSA	
D.D.T.	United States	1993	"Vogue"	Shut Up Kitty: A Cyber-Based Covers Compilation	
Dead or Alive	United Kingdom	1999	"Why's It So Hard"	Virgin Voices: A Tribute to Madonna, Vol. 1	
Drop Nineteens	United States	1992	"Angel"	Delaware	
Dianna Agron	United States	2010	"Express Yourself"	Glee: The Music, The Power of Madonna	
Doda Rabczewska	Poland	2008	"Like a Virgin"	Diamond Bitch (reedition)	
Duffy	United Kingdom	2008	"Borderline"	In Radio 1's Big Weekend	
Elton John	United Kingdom	2010	"Like a Virgin"	In Rainforest Fund Benefit Concert	
Elton John	United Kingdom	2010	"Material Girl"	In Rainforest Fund Benefit Concert	
Ellie Goulding	United Kingdom	2023	"Frozen"	Higher than Heaven Tour	
Eva Mattes	Germany	2006	"Who's That Girl"	Language of Love	
Exit Eden	United States	2017	"Frozen"	Rhapsodies in Black	
Josh Fawaz	Australia	2026	"Like a Prayer"	Dance Like Nobody's Watching	
Front Line Assembly	Canada	1999	"Justify My Love"	Virgin Voices: A Tribute to Madonna, Vol. 1	
Gene Loves Jezebel	United Kingdom	2000	"Frozen"	Virgin Voices 2000: A Tribute to Madonna	
Giant Drag	United States	2007	"Oh Father"	Through the Wilderness: Tribute to Madonna	
Giorgia	Italy	2014	"I'll Remember"	Senza Paura Tour	
Girl Authority	United States	2007	"Holiday"	Road Trip	
Girls Under Glass	Germany	2001	"Frozen"	Frozen EP	
Gretchen	Brazil	2012	"Justify My Love"	Internet	
Groove Armada	United Kingdom	2007	"Crazy for You"	Radio 1 Established 1967	
Heaven 17	United Kingdom	1999	"Holiday"	Virgin Voices: A Tribute to Madonna, Vol. 1	
Helena Paparizou	Sweden	2006	"Like a Prayer"	MAD Secret Concerts: Helena Paparizou	
Hilary Duff	United States	2006	"Material Girl"	In Material Girls	
Ilona Csáková	Czech Republic	1998	"La Isla Bonita"	Modrý sen	
Information Society	United States	1999	"Express Yourself"	Virgin Voices: A Tribute to Madonna, Vol. 1	
Jade Thirlwall	United Kingdom	2025	"Frozen"	Apple Music exclusive	
Jane Lynch	United States	2010	"Vogue"	Glee: The Music, The Power of Madonna	
Jason Thompson	Canada	1999	"Dress You Up"	For Gap's "Everybody in Vests" TV commercial	
Jayma Mays	United States	2010	"Like a Virgin"	Glee: The Music, The Power of Madonna	
Jaurim	South Korea	2005	"Take a Bow"	The Youth Admiration	
Jeremy Jay	United States	2007	"Into the Groove"	Through the Wilderness: Tribute to Madonna	
Jeff Scott Soto	United States	1998	"Frozen"	Truth	
Jim Broadbent	United States	2001	"Like a Virgin"	Moulin Rouge!	
Jody Watley	United States	2006	"Borderline"	The Makeover	
Jonathan Wilson	United States	2007	"La Isla Bonita"	Through the Wilderness: Tribute to Madonna	
Jonathan Groff	United States	2010	"Express Yourself"	Glee: The Music, The Power of Madonna	
Jonathan Groff	United States	2010	"Like a Virgin"	Glee: The Music, The Power of Madonna	
Jonathan Groff	United States	2010	"Like a Prayer"	Glee: The Music, The Power of Madonna	
John Wesley Harding	United Kingdom	1989	"Like a Prayer"	God Made Me Do It: The Christmas EP	
JoJo	United States	2012	"Like a Virgin"	Live performance in LACMA for the Harvard Westlake Charity	
Jorge González	Chile	2014	"Take a Bow"	YouTube	
Kate Ryan	Belgium	2020	"Holiday"	–	
Kelly Clarkson	United States	2002	"Express Yourself"	Audition from first season of American Idol	
Kelly Clarkson	United States	2012	"Material Girl"	Performer show in Stronger Tour	
Kelly Clarkson	United States	2020	"Like a Prayer"	At The Kelly Clarkson Show	
Kelly Clarkson	United States	2022	"Music"	At The Kelly Clarkson Show	
Kelly Llorenna	United Kingdom	2008, 2009	"Dress You Up"	From the Screen to Your Stereo Part II	
Kelly Osbourne	United Kingdom	2002	"Papa Don't Preach"	Soundtrack for program The Osbournes	
Kylie Minogue	Australia	2006, 2007, 2009	"Vogue"	Performer shows in Showgirl: The Homecoming Tour and For You, for Me	
KMFDM	Germany	1999	"Material Girl"	Virgin Voices: A Tribute to Madonna, Vol. 1	
Lacuna Coil	Italy	2016	"Live to Tell"	Bonus track from Delirium	
Labrinth	United Kingdom	2016	"Frozen"	2016 Billboard Women in Music	
Labrinth	United Kingdom	2016	"Like a Prayer"	2016 Billboard Women in Music	
LaFee	Germany	2021	"La Isla Bonita"	Zurück in die Zukunft, where the song was translated into German.	
Lana Del Rey	United States	2018	"You Must Love Me"	Andrew Lloyd Webber Unmasked: The Platinum Collection	
Laura León (featuring Tropikal Forever)	Mexico	2021	"Material Girl"	En Materia de Amor	
Lavender Diamond	United States	2007	"Like a Prayer"	Through the Wilderness: Tribute to Madonna	
Lea Michele	United States	2010	"Express Yourself"	Glee: The Music, The Power of Madonna	
Lea Michele	United States	2010	"Borderline/Open Your Heart"	Glee: The Music, The Power of Madonna	
Lea Michele	United States	2010	"Like a Virgin"	Glee: The Music, The Power of Madonna	
Lea Michele	United States	2010	"Like a Prayer"	Glee: The Music, The Power of Madonna	
Lea Michele	United States	2013	"Into the Groove"	Puppet Master episode, season 5	
Leo	Norway	2020	"Material Girl"	Digital single, YouTube	
Lion of Panjshir		2007	"Crazy for You"	Through the Wilderness: Tribute to Madonna	
Loleatta Holloway	United States	1999	"Like a Prayer"	Virgin Voices: A Tribute to Madonna, Vol. 1	
Loop Guru	United Kingdom	2000	"Cherish"	Virgin Voices 2000: A Tribute to Madonna	
Lucrezia	Italy	2001	"Live to Tell"	Logic Pride, Vol. 4	
Mad'House	Netherlands; France	2002	"Like a Prayer"	Absolutely Mad	
Mad'House	Netherlands; France	2002	"Holiday"	Absolutely Mad	
Mad'House	Netherlands; France	2002	"Into the Groove"	Absolutely Mad	
Mad'House	Netherlands; France	2002	"La Isla Bonita"	Absolutely Mad	
Mad'House	Netherlands; France	2002	"Like a Virgin"	Absolutely Mad	
Mad'House	Netherlands; France	2002	"Vogue"	Absolutely Mad	
Mad'House	Netherlands; France	2002	"Borderline"	Absolutely Mad	
Mad'House	Netherlands; France	2002	"Open Your Heart"	Absolutely Mad	
Mad'House	Netherlands; France	2002	"Papa Don't Preach"	Absolutely Mad	
Mad'House	Netherlands; France	2002	"Be Yourself"	Absolutely Mad	
Mad'House	Netherlands; France	2002	"Everybody"	Absolutely Mad	
Mad'House	Netherlands; France	2002	"Frozen"	Absolutely Mad	
Mad'House	Netherlands; France	2002	"Like a Prayer"	Absolutely Mad	
Mad'House	Netherlands; France	2002	"Like a Prayer"	Absolutely Mad	
Mad'House	Netherlands; France	2002	"Holiday"	Absolutely Mad	
Manic Street Preachers	United Kingdom	2022	"Borderline"	Covers	
Marina Koller	Germany	2002	"La Isla Bonita"	Unverschämt süß, where the song was translated into German.	
Mark Pistel	United States	2000	"Deeper and Deeper"	Virgin Voices 2000: A Tribute to Madonna	
Mark Salling	United States	2010	"What It Feels Like for a Girl"	Glee: The Music, The Power of Madonna	
Marilyn Manson	United States	c. 1990s	"Justify My Love"	—	
Matt Alber	United States	2011	"Take a Bow"	Constant Crows	
Matthew Morrison	United States	2010	"Like a Virgin"	Glee: The Music, The Power of Madonna	
Max Bemis	United States	2007	"Material Girl"	From the Screen to Your Stereo Part II	
Mephisto Walz	United States	2000	"Skin"	Virgin Voices 2000: A Tribute to Madonna	
Miley Cyrus	United States	2021	"Like a Prayer"	Attention: Miley Live	
Miley Cyrus	United States	2014	"Don't Tell Me"	Performed in a mash-up with her hit "We Can't Stop" alongside Madonna during Cyrus's MTV Unplugged special.	
Mina	Italy	1988	"Into the Groove"	Ridi pagliaccio	
Minako Honda	Japan	1986	"Material Girl"	Rise up MINAKO / LIVEの興奮！	
Missing Persons	United States	2006	"Into the Groove"	The World's Greatest 80's Tribute To Madonna	
Mötley Crüe	United States	2019	"Like a Virgin"	The Dirt Soundtrack	
MYMP	Philippines	2006	"Material Girl"	New Horizon	
My Vitriol	United Kingdom	2001	"Oh Father"	Finelines	
Naya Rivera	United States	2010	"Express Yourself"	Glee: The Music, The Power of Madonna	
Naya Rivera	United States	2010	"Like a Virgin"	Glee: The Music, The Power of Madonna	
Natasha Bedingfield	United Kingdom	2007	"Ray of Light"	Radio 1 Established 1967	
New Found Glory	United States	2007	"Crazy for You"	From the Screen to Your Stereo Part II	
Nelly Furtado	Canada	2012	"Like a Prayer"	Performer shows in The Spirit Indestructible Tour	
Ninel Conde	Mexico	2011	"Material Girl" ("Chica Material")	Ayer y Hoy	
Nivek Ogre	Canada	2000	"Borderline"	Virgin Voices 2000: A Tribute to Madonna	
Ofra Haza	Israel	2000	"Open Your Heart"	Virgin Voices 2000: A Tribute to Madonna	
Out of Your Mouth	Canada	2005	"Music"	Draghdad	
Olga Buzova	Russia	2017	"Vogue"	Sounds Of Kisses Tour	
Paul Mauriat	France	1985	"Like a Virgin"	Transparence	
Quentin Elias	France	1998	"Holiday"	Live performances	
Quentin Elias	France	1998	"La Isla Bonita"	Live performances	
Rashida Jones	United States	1999	"Dress You Up"	For Gap's "Everybody in Vests" TV commercial	
Reel Big Fish	United States	2007	"Dress You Up"	Duet All Night Long	
Renato Russo	Brazil	1994	"Cherish"	The Stonewall Celebration Concert	
Richard Cheese	United States	2004	"Material Girl"	I'd Like a Virgin	
Richard Page	United States	2011	"I'll Remember"	Solo Acoustic	
Rihanna	Barbados	2008	"Vogue"	Live performance in Fashion Rocks gala event 2008, and online	
Rita Ora	United Kingdom	2017	"Like a Virgin"	Live performance on BBC Radio 1.	
Royal Philharmonic Orchestra	United Kingdom	1998	"True Blue"	Material Girl: RPO Plays Music of Madonna	
Royal Philharmonic Orchestra	United Kingdom	1998	"La Isla Bonita"	Material Girl: RPO Plays Music of Madonna	
Royal Philharmonic Orchestra	United Kingdom	1998	"Papa Don't Preach"	Material Girl: RPO Plays Music of Madonna	
Royal Philharmonic Orchestra	United Kingdom	1998	"Like a Prayer"	Material Girl: RPO Plays Music of Madonna	
Royal Philharmonic Orchestra	United Kingdom	1998	"Crazy for You"	Material Girl: RPO Plays Music of Madonna	
Royal Philharmonic Orchestra	United Kingdom	1998	"This Used to Be My Playground"	Material Girl: RPO Plays Music of Madonna	
Royal Philharmonic Orchestra	United Kingdom	1998	"Borderline"	Material Girl: RPO Plays Music of Madonna	
Royal Philharmonic Orchestra	United Kingdom	1998	"Into the Groove"	Material Girl: RPO Plays Music of Madonna	
Royal Philharmonic Orchestra	United Kingdom	1998	"Like a Virgin"	Material Girl: RPO Plays Music of Madonna	
Royal Philharmonic Orchestra	United Kingdom	1998	"Holiday"	Material Girl: RPO Plays Music of Madonna	
Royal Philharmonic Orchestra	United Kingdom	1998	"Material Girl"	Material Girl: RPO Plays Music of Madonna	
Royal Philharmonic Orchestra	United Kingdom	1998	"Who's That Girl"	Material Girl: RPO Plays Music of Madonna	
Rufio	United States	2002	"Like a Prayer"	Punk Goes Pop	
Sally Yeh	Hong Kong	2018	"Material Girl"	Crazy Rich Asians	
Sam Smith	United Kingdom	2023	"Human Nature"	During Gloria the Tour	
Samantha Fox	United Kingdom	2015	"La Isla Bonita"	Single	
Selena Gomez	United States	2018	"One More Chance"	—	
Sentidos Opuestos	Mexico	2000	"One More Chance" ("Hoy Que No Estás")	Movimiento Perpetuo	
Sertab Erener	Turkey	2004	"Music"	Crossing the Bridge: The Sound of Istanbul	
She & Him	United States	2021	"Holiday"	A Very She & Him Christmas	
Sia	Australia	2010	"Oh Father"	We Are Born	
Siddhartha	United States	2007	"Holiday"	Through the Wilderness: Tribute to Madonna	
Simona Ventura	Italy	2008 & 2025	"La Isla Bonita"	In L'isola dei famosi & Che tempo che fa	
Stardeath and White Dwarfs	United States	2009	"Borderline"	Covered, A Revolution in Sound	
Sitti	Philippines	2007	"Take a Bow"	My Bossa Nova	
Switchblade Symphony	United States	2000	"Lucky Star"	Virgin Voices 2000: A Tribute to Madonna	
Shakira	Colombia	1990	"Material Girl"	Audition	
Showoff	United States	2002	"Borderline"	Punk Goes Pop	
Slovak Philharmonic Orchestra	Slovakia	2013	"Die Another Day"	Reader's Digest Music: The Bond Mix and Other Spy Movie Themes	
Sonic Youth (as Ciccone Youth)	United States	1986	"Into the Groove"	The Whitey Album	
Sonic Youth (as Ciccone Youth)	United States	1986	"Burning Up"	The Whitey Album	
Superbus	France	2002	"Into the Groove"	Aéromusical	
Susan Boyle	Scotland	2008	"You'll See"	I Dreamed a Dream	
Susan Boyle	Scotland	2016	"Like a Prayer"	A Wonderful World	
Talisman	Sweden	1998	"Frozen"	Truth	
Těžkej Pokondr	Czech Republic	2011	"La Isla Bonita" ("Ladislav Bonita")	Superalbum	
Teenage Fanclub	Scotland	1991	"Like a Virgin"	The King	
The Countdown Singers		1999	"Who's That Girl"	Hit Parade of 80's, Vol. 2	
The Flaming Lips	United States	2009	"Borderline"	Covered, A Revolution in Sound	
The Lords of the New Church	United Kingdom; United States	1985	"Like a Virgin"	Killer Lords	
The Medic Droid	United States	2008	"Into the Groove"	Whats Your Medium	
Theresa Andersson	United States	2006	"Borderline"	Theresa Andersson EP	
Thy Disease	Poland	2001	"Frozen"	Devilsh Act of Creation	
Tori Amos	United States	2005	"Like a Prayer"	Original Sinsuality Tour and Summer of Sin	
Tori Amos	United States	2011	"Live to Tell"	Night of Hunters Tour	
Tori Amos	United States	2014	"Frozen"	Unrepentant Geraldines Tour	
Trisha Yearwood	United States	2007	"Take a Bow"	CMT's Crossroads	
The Triffids	Australia	1988	"Into the Groove"	b-side to single "Bury Me Deep in Love"	
Twilight Guardians	Finland	2006	"La Isla Bonita"	SinTrade	
Urbandub	Philippines	2011	"This Used To Be My Playground"	Sending A Message	
Virgin	Poland	2002	"Material Girl"	Virgin	
Walk Off the Earth	Canada	2012	"Material Girl"	—	
Waltari	Finland	1992	"Vogue"	Torcha!	
Wendy Sulca	Peru	2012	"Like a Virgin"	YouTube	
Wet Leg	United Kingdom	2022	"Material Girl"	SiriusXMU sessions	
Winifred Phillips	United States	2020	"Material Girl"	Sackboy: A Big Adventure	
Valeria Marini	Italy	2008 & 2025	"La Isla Bonita"	In L'isola dei famosi & Che tempo che fa	
Yami Bolo	Jamaica	1991	"La Isla Bonita"	La, Isla, Bonita	
Yuridia	Mexico	2009	"Material Girl"	Performer in National Auditorium of Mexico City	
Yungblud	United Kingdom	2021	"Like a Virgin"	Spotify Singles Sessions	
Zolof the Rock & Roll Destroyer	United States	2007	"Dress You Up" (Like "Ode to Madonna")	Duet All Night Long	

== Charted cover songs ==
Title song	Year	Peak chart positions										Artist and album
Title song	Year	US	AUS	CAN	BEL	NED	FRA	GER	IRL	SWI	UK	Artist and album
"La Isla Bonita"	1986/87	—	—	—	—	25	—	—	—	—	—	Micaela (from Dureco)
"Holiday"	1998	—	—	—	—	—	—	—	—	—	77	Who's That Girl! (from Almighty Presents: We Love Madonna)
"Like a Prayer" / "Don't Cry for Me Argentina"	1998	—	—	—	—	—	—	—	—	—	88	Who's That Girl! (from Almighty Presents: We Love Madonna)
"Like a Prayer"	2002	—	—	—	2	2	5	1	1	2	3	Mad'House (from Absolutely Mad)
"Holiday"	2002	—	—	—	15	17	10	23	19	18	24	Mad'House (from Absolutely Mad)
"Like a Virgin"	2002	—	—	—	31	56	55	67	—	98	—	Mad'House (from Absolutely Mad)
"Papa Don't Preach"	2002	74	3	—	—	64	—	24	—	65	3	Kelly Osbourne (from Shut Up)
"Like a Virgin"	2005	—	—	—	—	—	—	91	—	—	—	Texas Lightning (from Meanwhile, Back at the Ranch)
"Papa Don't Preach"	2010	—	—	—	—	—	—	—	—	—	81	Glee cast (from Glee: The Music, The Power of Madonna)
"Express Yourself"	2010	—	—	—	—	—	—	—	—	—	132	Glee cast (from Glee: The Music, The Power of Madonna)
"Borderline" / "Open Your Heart"	2010	78	—	74	—	—	—	—	—	—	66	Glee cast (from Glee: The Music, The Power of Madonna)
"Vogue"	2010	—	—	—	—	—	—	—	—	—	106	Glee cast (from Glee: The Music, The Power of Madonna)
"Like a Virgin"	2010	87	99	83	—	—	—	—	47	—	58	Glee cast (from Glee: The Music, The Power of Madonna)
"4 Minutes"	2010	89	—	70	—	—	—	—	32	—	42	Glee cast (from Glee: The Music, The Power of Madonna)
"What It Feels Like for a Girl"	2010	—	—	—	—	—	—	—	—	—	125	Glee cast (from Glee: The Music, The Power of Madonna)
"Like a Prayer"	2010	27	28	27	—	—	—	—	2	—	16	Glee cast (from Glee: The Music, The Power of Madonna)
"La Isla Bonita"	2012	99	—	93	—	—	—	—	—	—	152	Glee cast with Ricky Martin (in "The Spanish Teacher")
"Like a Virgin"	2012	—	—	—	—	—	—	—	—	—	97	Vince Kidd (from The Voice UK albums)
"Like a Virgin"	2012	—	9	—	—	—	—	—	—	—	—	Joke Vincke (from The Voice van Vlaanderen albums)
"Like a Virgin"	2014	—	—	—	—	—	185	—	—	—	—	Cristina Scuccia (from Sister Cristina)
"Like a Prayer"	2022	—	—	—	—	—	—	—	—	—	79	Miley Cyrus (from Attention: Miley Live)
"—" denotes a title that did not chart, or was not released in that territory.

== See also ==
- List of Madonna tribute albums
- Dancemania Speed 6
- Like a Version

== Book sources ==
- Barcella, Laura (2012). Madonna and Me: Women Writers on the Queen of Pop. Soft Skull Press. ISBN 978-1-59376-475-3.
- Cooke, Mervyn; Ford, Fiona (2016). The Cambridge Companion to Film Music. Cambridge University Press. ISBN 978-1107094512.
- Dimery, Robert (2011). 1001 Songs: You Must Hear Before You Die. Hachette UK. ISBN 978-1844037179.
- Forman-Brunell, Miriam (2001). Girlhood in America: A-G. ABC-CLIO. ISBN 1576072061.
- Janjatović, Petar (2001). Ilustrovana YU rock enciklopedija: 1960-2000 (in Bosnian).
- Kaplan, Arie (2012). American Pop: Hit Makers, Superstars, and Dance Revolutionaries. Twenty-First Century Book. ISBN 978-1467701488.
- Los Prieto Flores; Muguruza, Isa (2021). Madonna. Una biografía (in Spanish). Penguin Random House Grupo Editorial. ISBN 978-8417809829.
- Oleksy, Elżbieta H.; Rydzewska, Joanna (2004). Representing Gender in Cultures. Peter Lang. ISBN 0-820-46546-1.
- Reighley, Kurt (2015). Marilyn Manson. St. Martin's Publishing Group. ISBN 978-1250098764.
- Rolling Stone (2001). Rolling Stone Encyclopedia of Rock & Roll: Rolling Stone Encyclopedia of Rock & Roll. Touchstone Books. ISBN 0743201205.
- Saucerman, Linda (2004). Ozzy Osbourne and Kelly Osbourne. The Rosen Publishing Group. ISBN 1404202625.
