= Open Your Heart (Madonna song) =

1986 single by Madonna

Single by Madonna

from the album True Blue
- B-side: "White Heat"
- Released: November 12, 1986
- Studio: Channel Recording (Los Angeles, CA)
- Genre: Dance-pop
- Length: 4:13
- Label: Sire; Warner Bros.
- Songwriters: Madonna; Gardner Cole; Peter Rafelson
- Producers: Madonna; Patrick Leonard

Madonna singles chronology
"True Blue" (1986)	"Open Your Heart" (1986)	"La Isla Bonita" (1987)

Music video
- "Open Your Heart" on YouTube

"Open Your Heart" is a song recorded by American singer Madonna from her third studio album True Blue (1986). Written by Gardner Cole and Peter Rafelson, it was conceived as a rock and roll song titled "Follow Your Heart" for singer Cyndi Lauper, although it was never played for her. At the time, Cole's management was working with Madonna's, who were looking for material for True Blue. "Follow Your Heart" was among the songs offered to the singer. She liked it and, alongside producer Patrick Leonard, turned it into a dance song, changed its title and re-wrote some of the lyrics, thus receiving a songwriting credit.

Lyrically, it is an innuendo-laden love song where the singer expresses her determination and sexual desire for a man. In the United States, "Open Your Heart" was released as the fourth single from True Blue on November 12, 1986. Overseas, a release was issued on December 1. Besides positive critical feedback, it was Madonna's fifth number one single in the US Billboard Hot 100. She became the second female artist—behind Whitney Houston—to score three number ones from one album. "Open Your Heart" also reached the top-ten of the charts in Canada, Belgium, Ireland, the Netherlands, and the United Kingdom.

Directed by Jean-Baptiste Mondino, the song's accompanying music video depicts Madonna as an exotic dancer at a peep show a little boy is trying to sneak into. Seen as the singer's first overtly sexual clip, it takes influence from Liza Minnelli's performance in the 1972 film Cabaret. The visual received praise for presenting women as the dominant sex, but its sexual nature and plot of a child entering a strip joint received criticism. "Open Your Heart" has been performed on four of Madonna's concert tours, the most recent being the Celebration Tour of 2023—2024. It has been covered by a handful of artists, and featured in movies and television series like Crossroads (2002) and Glee.

== Background ==
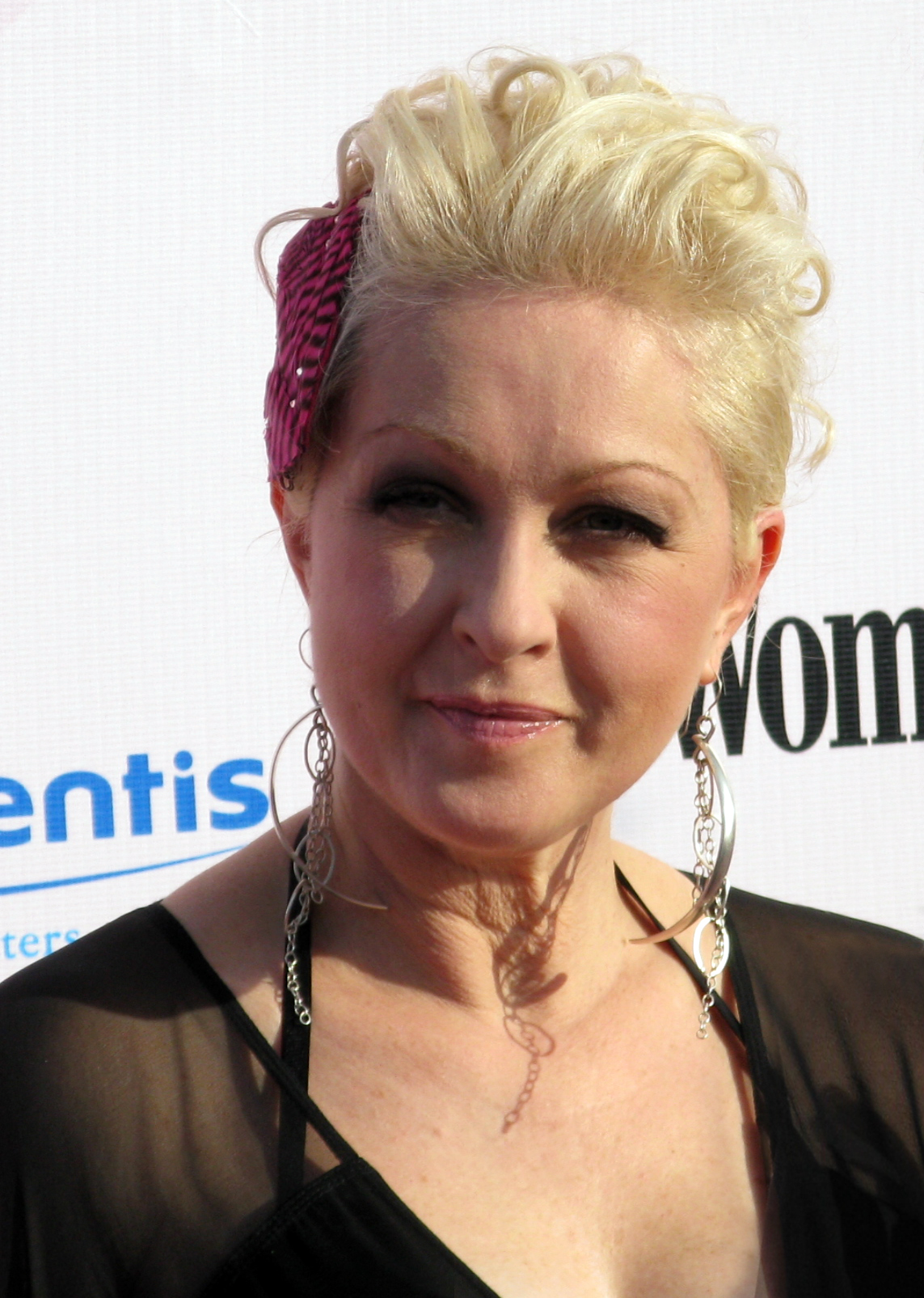
Cyndi Lauper, whom "Follow Your Heart" was initially written for.

"Open Your Heart" was written by Gardner Cole and Peter Rafelson. Originally titled "Follow Your Heart", it was conceived as a rock and roll song with singer Cyndi Lauper in mind, although she never even got to hear it. The Temptations was reportedly considered for the song as well. "Follow Your Heart" was inspired by a health-food restaurant Cole knew in Canoga Park, Los Angeles. Him and Rafelson then spent a year "perfecting" the track, even though they tended to work at a faster pace; "for some reason this didn't really hit us as a hit song. We didn't give up. We just kept working on it", recalled Cole. A demo was recorded by the pair, which Tom Breihan from Stereogum described as a "pretty generic mid-’80s synth-rocker". Benett Freed, who was Cole's manager at the time, was working with Madonna's team and offered them a handful of songs for the singer's third studio album True Blue.

"Follow Your Heart" was among the songs Madonna's team picked out, something that surprised Cole as he felt it "didn't really fit into what [Madonna] was doing at the time [...] it was more rock and roll than I thought she would want to go". Upon request, Cole recorded a new version of the demo with his girlfriend Donna De Lory singing; Madonna allegedly liked this new demo so much that she eventually hired De Lory as backup singer. Alongside her collaborator Patrick Leonard, the singer reworked the track; they added a bassline and changed it from a straightforward rock song to a "dizzy, driving dance-pop jam". Additionally, Madonna rewrote some of the lyrics, which allowed her to get a songwriting credit, and changed the song's name to "Open Your Heart".

The first song recorded for True Blue, "Open Your Heart", along with the rest of the album, was recorded at Los Angeles' Channel Recording studios. Cole was not sure "Open Your Heart" would make the final track list; "a lot of times the very first song that gets cut doesn't make it in the long run, but it did, which really opened up a lot of doors for me", he recalled. The song success would help him get signed as an artist to Warner Bros. Records and formed a partnership with Leonard.

== Composition and release ==
Personnel working on "Open Your Heart" included Jonathan Moffett on drums, Paulinho da Costa on percussion, and David Williams on guitars. Leonard himself was in charge of the keyboards. "Open Your Heart is a dance-pop song with rock and roll elements, and melancholic lyrics that talk about a woman determined to get a man to open up to her. According to the sheet music published by Alfred Publishing Inc., it is set in the time signature of common time, with a medium funk tempo of 112 beats per minute. The song is composed in the key of F major, with Madonna's vocals spanning from A_{3} to C_{5}. It follows a basic sequence of F–E♭_{9}–E♭/G–Gm_{7}–F as its chord progression.

"Open Your Heart"
25-second audio sample of "Open Your Heart", in which Madonna sings the main refrain backed by percussion.

It begins with the singer whispering watch out! over a "continuous" percussive battery. In the opening verse she sings, I see you on the street and you walk on by/You make me wanna hang my head down and cry, evoking a sense of "overwhelmed sadness" and portraying herself as a "victim of love", as noted by Tom Breihan, and authors Julia Pascal, Serena Sartori and Renata Coluccini. The theme of determination is reflected on lines such as I've had to work much harder than this, Don't try to run/I can keep up with you, and I'll make you love me. Determination is also represented in one the song's remixes; its outro has Madonna explicitly asking: Well, are you gonna go out with me or not?/What's the matter? Scared of me or something?

On the refrain, Madonna uses vocals that are "full of pleading, yearning and infectious urgency"; Open your heart to me/I hold the lock and you hold the key, she sings. Sexual innuendo is present, with the staff of Billboard pointing out: "[Madonna] yearns for a man to open her lock with his key. And yes, that means exactly what you think it does". By his part, author Santiago Fouz-Hernández wrote that the line if you gave me half a chance you'd see, my desire burning inside of me puts Madonna in a "more direct position of expressing her sexual desires for a man". In the United States, "Open Your Heart" was released as the fourth single from True Blue on November 12, 1986. In Europe and Australia, the single was issued on December 1. It was then added to Madonna's compilation albums The Immaculate Collection (1990), Celebration (2009), and Finally Enough Love: 50 Number Ones (2022).

== Critical reception ==
"Thrumming with an undercurrent of desire, ['Open Your Heart'] underscores [Madonna's] ability to sew snippets of innuendo so mischievously into the fabric of her work that you often don't realize the true aim of a song. Couple that with a blissful shuffle beat and frisky keyboards and the result is a glorious confection with bite".

— Melissa Ruggieri from USA Today reviewing "Open Your Heart" on the publication's ranking of Madonna songs, where it came in at number one.

Critical feedback towards "Open Your Heart" has been positive. J. Randy Taraborrelli, author of Madonna: An Intimate Biography, deemed it one of her most "earnest" songs, and compared it to Aretha Franklin's "Respect" (1967), and Barbra Streisand's "A House is Not a Home" (1971); the author further added that it was a song people could "understand and latch on to, [which is] what makes [it] memorable". While author Daryl Easlea hailed it a "fabulous, muscular, anthemic" track, Stewart Mason from AllMusic said it marked "one of [Madonna's] most exciting grooves" up to that point. Erika Wexler from Spin named it an "appealing 'I'm going to get you' song", with a "shimmering" production that "effectively creates the expansive feel of something magically opening". Slant Magazine's Sal Cinquemani deemed it "robust", and considered it one of Madonna's "biggest, most influential hits". Stephen Thomas Erlewine, writing for The A.V. Club, applauded the singer's "passionate" vocals, and referred to "Open Your Heart" as one of her most "exuberant, bright [and] bustling" singles.

James Croot from New Zealand website Stuff said it was a "heart-skipping, joyous song, full of life". "Open Your Heart" provides True Blue with a "healthy dose of the '80s disco that first got [Madonna] noticed", according to The Sunday Telegraph's Larry Nager. In this vein, Tom Breihan added that, "there's a straight line from the post-disco dance-pop of [her] early years to 'Open Your Heart', but the track is busier than those older songs". Breihan went on to single out Madonna's vocals, and referred to the song as a "beautiful piece of architecture [...] one of the best singles in a career full of great ones". To Matthew Rettenmund, "['Open Your Heart'] is not one of Madonna's best-written songs. But therein lies a major part of [her] magic: She is capable of singing about a simple situation and imbuing it with heart felt emotion". More critical was People's Drew Mackie, who said that, despite its "unforgettable" refrain, it's not up to par to the singer's other hits of the time. One negative review came from the Los Angeles Times, where Robert Hilburn dismissed "Open Your Heart" as "uneventful", and one of True Blue's "flat spots".

"Open Your Heart" is considered Madonna's 37th best single by Gay Star News's Joe Morgan, and her 29th best by Nayer Missim from PinkNews. The former called it "one of [her] classics, and for a good reason". For Billboard's Joe Lynch, "few can sing about desire deferred and sound so damn exuberant while doing it, but Madonna provides a masterclass on the defiant 'Open Your Heart'". He named it her 26th best song. On his ranking of Madonna singles, Entertainment Weekly's Chuck Arnold placed "Open Your Heart" in the thirteenth position, further writing: "As much as [she] may be known for her more titillating songs, she has also been capable of pure pop bliss. That can be heard on 'Open Your Heart' [...] she has rarely sounded more open-hearted than she does here". In Parade's list, Samuel R. Murrian named it an "essential cut" in Madonna's discography, and her twelfth best. "Open Your Heart" was referred to as one of Madonna's "sparkliest imperial-period singles" by Jude Rogers from The Guardian, who also said it was the singer's eleventh greatest song. Yahoo!'s Nicole Hogsett also deemed it Madonna's eleventh best, and added that, "from the opening notes, you know that this song is going to be enjoyable". "Open Your Heart" was included on Bruce Pollock's Rock Song Index: The 7500 Most Important Songs for the Rock & Roll Era.

== Chart performance ==
On December 6, 1986, "Open Your Heart" debuted on the Billboard Hot 100 at number 51, becoming the highest-debuting single of the week. Almost one month later, when the song climbed to number seven, Madonna achieved her eleventh consecutive top-ten hit, breaking Brenda Lee's record for the most consecutive top-ten hits by a female singer in the rock era. She also tied Michael Jackson and Lionel Richie for the most consecutive top ten-hits by any artist in the 1980s. "Open Your Heart" reached the Hot 100's top spot on February 7, 1987, becoming Madonna's fifth number one in the US. She became the second female behind Whitney Houston to score three number ones from one album; the second behind Barbra Streisand to land a number one in four successive years, and the second behind Diana Ross with five number ones strictly as a solo artist. Furthermore, Madonna broke the record of being the only female singer –and one of only four acts– to score five number ones in the decade. The song becoming the fourth consecutive top five release from True Blue. Billboard reported that 75,000 copies of the 12" single had been sold by July 1987. "Open Your Heart" came in at number 30 on Billboard's year-end chart for 1986.

In Canada, the single debuted at number 83 on the RPM Top Singles chart for the week of December 13, 1986; two months later, it peaked at number eight, becoming Madonna's tenth consecutive top 10 hit in the country. Additionally, "Open Your Heart" reached the first spot in El Salvador. In the United Kingdom, the song debuted at the eighth position of the UK Singles Chart on December 13, 1986, and, one week later, peaked at number 4; it spent 9 weeks on the chart overall. "Open Your Heart" was certified silver by the British Phonographic Industry (BPI). According to MTV UK, over 195,000 copies of the single have been sold in the United Kingdom as of 2010.

In Australia, "Open Your Heart" reached the chart's 16th spot, breaking a run of nine consecutive top-ten singles that Madonna had in the country. It was a top-ten hit in Belgium, the Netherlands, Italy, Iceland, and Ireland. Furthermore, "Open Your Heart" became the only single from True Blue that did not top the Eurochart Hot 100, coming in at four. It was less successful in Austria and Germany, where it barely cracked the top-twenty. In France, it peaked at number 24.

== Music video ==
=== Background ===
The music video for "Open Your Heart" was directed by Jean-Baptiste Mondino, and shot in the Echo Park in Los Angeles during the summer of 1986. Crew included David Naylor in production, Pascal Lebègue in cinematography, and Dick Sylvert in production design. Music & Media magazine had previously reported that the visual would be directed by actor Sean Penn, the singer's then-husband. According to the Houston Chronicle' Bruce Westbrook, the clip takes influence from Liza Minnelli's "Mein Herr" number in Bob Fosse's Cabaret (1972). Madonna plays an exotic dancer at a peep show who is the "object of admiration and, murkily, love" for a young boy, played by child actor Felix Howard. The peep show theme was Mondino's idea as, in his own words, "at the time, we were into a period where we were experimenting [with] some kind of freedom about the body, about sexuality and stuff". The set, including a ticket booth at the front, was built from scratch; "it was my Hollywood period where I was in [a] Hollywood state of mind with my cranes, the building [...] when I saw it, I said, 'It's so naïve'. It's kind of badly done, which I like[d]", recalled the director. In the visual, Madonna wears a black satin bustier with gold nipple caps and tassels designed by Marlene Stewart. At Mondino's suggestion, she also wore a black wig:

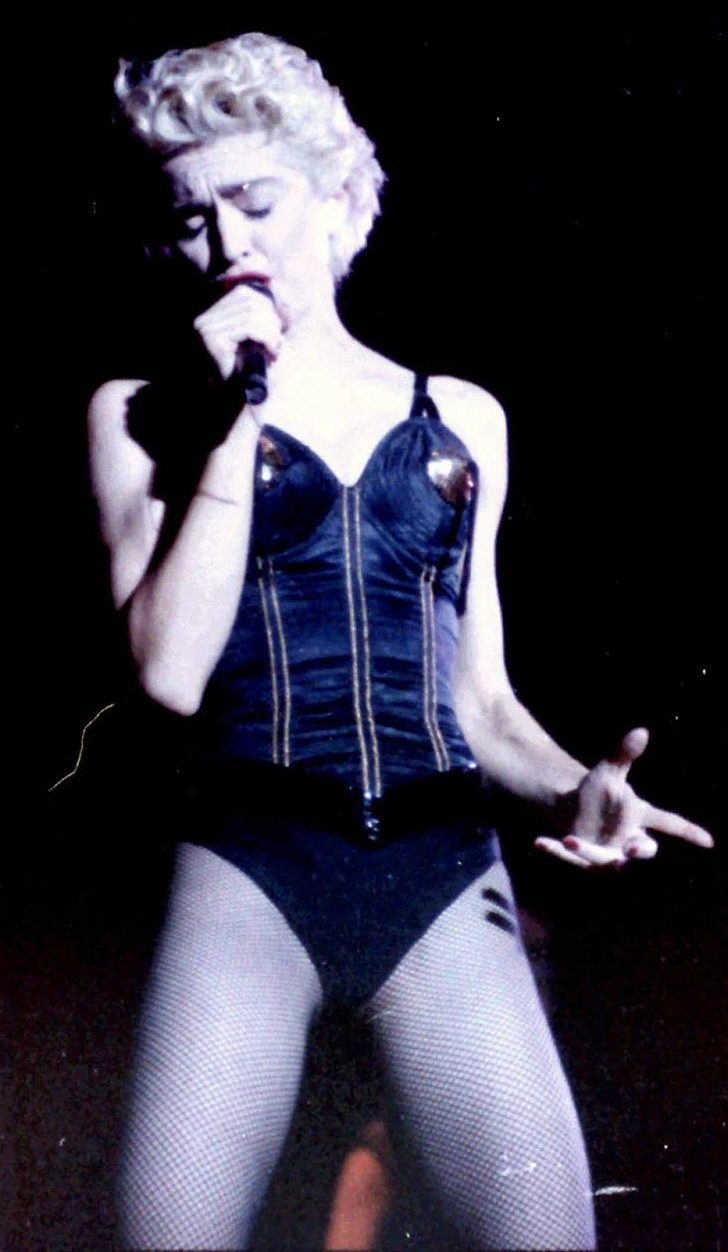
Madonna singing "Open Your Heart" on 1987's Who's That Girl World Tour, donning the same bustier from the video.

"I said to [Madonna], 'You know it could be nice maybe if you wear a black wig', because she was known as being the blonde with short hair. So a few days before the shoot, we had the meeting with hair and makeup and they work on her and they prepare her with the outfit and the wig and stuff. [...] Then she turns around and she looks at me with the wig on and says, 'OK, Mondino — tell me what do you think'. [...] I look at her and say, 'Well, you look great, but to be honest, I prefer you in blonde'. She looked and me and that day, she trusted me because she knew more than anyone else that she was better in blonde".

=== Synopsis ===
It begins with views of the strip joint's sign, which features three naked women, the center of which is a reproduction of The Slave (Andromeda) by Tamara de Lempicka, with the painted woman's nipples replaced with light bulbs. Then, an underage boy (Howard) tries to sneak in to see the show but gets rebuffed by the old man in the ticket booth. The boy sees a poster of Madonna, caresses it, and begins mimicking how he imagines she dances for the audience. Inside, there are several booths with windows looking onto a center stage. When coins are inserted in a slot in the booth, the curtain rises and allows the viewer to see Madonna perform. Watching the show from the booths are a man dressed as a cowboy, a businessman, an older man, a couple of gay sailors with their arms draped around each other, a butch lesbian, and wooden cut-outs of men from Tamara de Lempicka paintings.

Throughout the video, Madonna dances using a single chair as prop. In her first shot, she wears the black wig. She then leans back in the chair and yanks it off to reveal her cropped platinum hair. Interspersed footage of the singer performing and shots of the viewers in their booths play next. This time, one of them is the young boy from the beginning. One shot has the elderly man in the booth reassembling his clothes, as if he was just masturbating. In the final scene, Madonna gives Howard a quick kiss on his lips. They are both now outside of the joint, dressed in matching loose-fitting gray suits. The video ends with them strolling away playfully in the sunrise, as the old man from the ticket booth chases after them shouting, "Come back, come back, we still need you" in Italian.

=== Reception and analysis ===
Screenshot from the "Open Your Heart" music video, in which Madonna kisses Felix Howard on the lips. This particular shot caused some controversy and was criticized by author Ilene Rosenzweig.

The video was added to MTV the week of November 22, 1986. It received positive reviews from critics, with Matthew Rettenmund deeming it the singer's best up to that point, as well as the "first glimpse of how far [she] was willing to go to make cutting-edge artistic videos". Westbrook compared it to "Material Girl" (1985), as in both clips, Madonna plays a "role within a role; [she] gets her audience's attention with skin and flashiness, then assumes a warm, sweet pose at the end as if to say, 'It was all an act. I'm a good-hearted, sensitive person in real life'". From The New York Times, Vincent Canby described the video as "extraordinarily provocative [...] In a brisk, haikulike 4 minutes and 22 second, [it] presents Madonna as every adolescent boy's wildest, sweetest fantasy. A tiny, comic, sexy classic". Samuel R. Murrian referred to "Open Your Heart" as a "sexy, clever [and] hilarious" video, as well as Madonna's 14th best. "Open Your Heart" was named Madonna's third greatest music video by Rolling Stone, The Backlot, and Slant Magazine. On the first publication, it was referred to as "gorgeous" and an "even mix of Fellini and Fosse". It was considered one of the best videos of 1986 by Westbrook, and the 22nd greatest of all time by Slant Magazine. At the 1987 MTV Video Music Awards, "Open Your Heart" was nominated for Best Art Direction, Best Choreography, and Best Female Video.

Both Mark Bego and the staff of Rolling Stone pointed out it was Madonna's first "overtly sexual" music video, with the former also noting that it was her first to explicitly feature homosexual imagery, something author Mary Gabriel also pointed out. Bego went on to compare the singer's dance with the chair to those of Marlene Dietrich in The Blue Angel (1930), and Liza Minnelli in Cabaret. On this vein, Tom Breihan said the visual paid tribute to stars of the Golden Age of Hollywood such as Rita Hayworth. The final shot in which Madonna and Howard wander off together was compared to that of Charlie Chaplin and Jackie Coogan in The Kid (1921). Daryl Easlea noted that "Open Your Heart" introduced "what would become Madonna's single most iconic wardrobe item: The conical bra". The singer's look with the bustier was named one of her most "unforgettable" and "iconic" by People magazine and Billboard. In April 1992, the bustier was stolen from Frederick's of Hollywood's lingerie museum during the 6-day riots, but was eventually recovered. Of the visual, Joe Morgan said it made "short hair on women sexy".

"[The video is] a statement about innocence versus decadence and in the end I chose innocence. That's what the child represented ― the child-like quality everybody has versus all the people in the club who were jaded and decadent and depraved".

— Madonna commenting on the video and its themes.

The video's sexual nature generated some backlash. According to Westbrook, Texas-based network Hit Video USA opted not to air it because of its suggestive themes. MTV allegedly also had some reservations about airing it on its entirety, and suggested alterations. This was solved after a meeting with representatives from Warner Bros., Madonna's label. Academic Georges-Claude Guilbert, author of Madonna as Postmodern Myth, noted that feminist groups accused the singer of "setting back history", and reproached her for "promoting the return of bustiers and corsets". Her portrayal of a sex worker also provoked a debate among feminists about whether or not it was objectifying or empowering. Further criticism was given to the video's plot of a child entering a strip club, and "lasciviously" kissing the older Madonna. Rettenmund defended this scene, saying it was devoid of sexual connotations, and that Howard's character is actually admiring Madonna's, "coveting her feminine allure [...] the apparent glamour of [her] life". Breihan echoed this sentiment, adding that, "he doesn't want to jerk off to her. He wants to be her". "Open Your Heart" is considered one of the singer's most controversial music videos by HuffPost's Daniel Welsh, and Sal Cinquemani.

Additionally, the clip been noted for subverting the male gaze and presenting women as the dominant sex. In Religion and Popular Culture in America, Bruce Forbes and Jeffrey H. Mahan compared its themes to the ones in Mötley Crüe's "Girls, Girls, Girls" (1987), with the difference being that "Open Your Heart" is told from Madonna's point of view; she looks down into the booths to make eye contact with the male viewers but they are unable to return it. Donn Welton pointed out that the power relationship between the "voyeuristic male gaze and object" is destabilized by the portrayal of the male audience members as "leering and pathetic". At the same time, the portrayal of Madonna as "porno queen object" is deconstructed by her "cheerful" escape from the strip joint at the end of the video. "Open Your Heart" can be found on Madonna's video compilations The Immaculate Collection (1990) and Celebration: The Video Collection (2009).

== Live performances ==
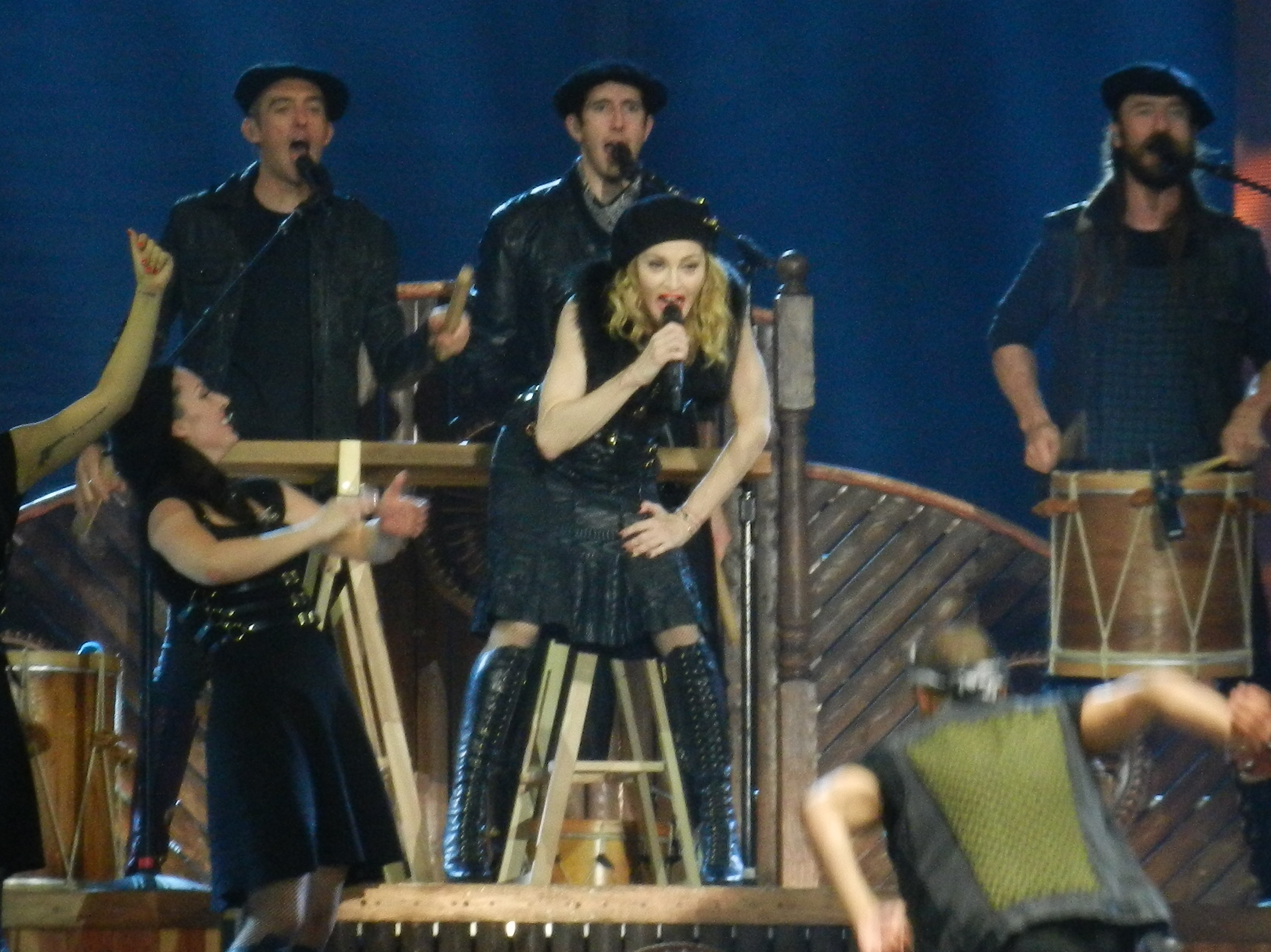
Madonna and Basque band Kalakan performing "Open Your Heart" on the MDNA Tour of 2012

"Open Your Heart" has been included on four of Madonna's concert tours: Who's That Girl (1987), Blond Ambition (1990), MDNA (2012), and Celebration (2023―2024). On the first one, it was the opening number and saw the singer running "back and forth across the stage", with a giant Tamara de Lempicka portrait projected behind her. She wore the same bustier from the music video and was joined by 13-year-old dancer Chris Finch. For The Washington Post, Richard Harrington noted that Madonna's outfit was "a lot less suggestive than some of her body movements". Two different performances can be found on the videos Who's That Girl: Live in Japan, filmed in Tokyo on June, and Ciao Italia: Live from Italy, filmed in Turin on September.

For the performance on the Blond Ambition World Tour, the singer wore the corset with conical-shaped cups designed by Jean Paul Gaultier, and did a choreography with a chair while a muscular dancer watched from afar. Harrington opined it was one of the concert's numbers that "suffered from overly tight choreography that left little to chance, less to spontaneity and nothing to the imagination". Two different performances can be found in Blond Ambition Japan Tour 90, taped in Yokohama, and in Blond Ambition World Tour Live, taped in Nice. Eleven years later, the song's opening introduction was used as a brief interlude on the singer's Drowned World Tour.

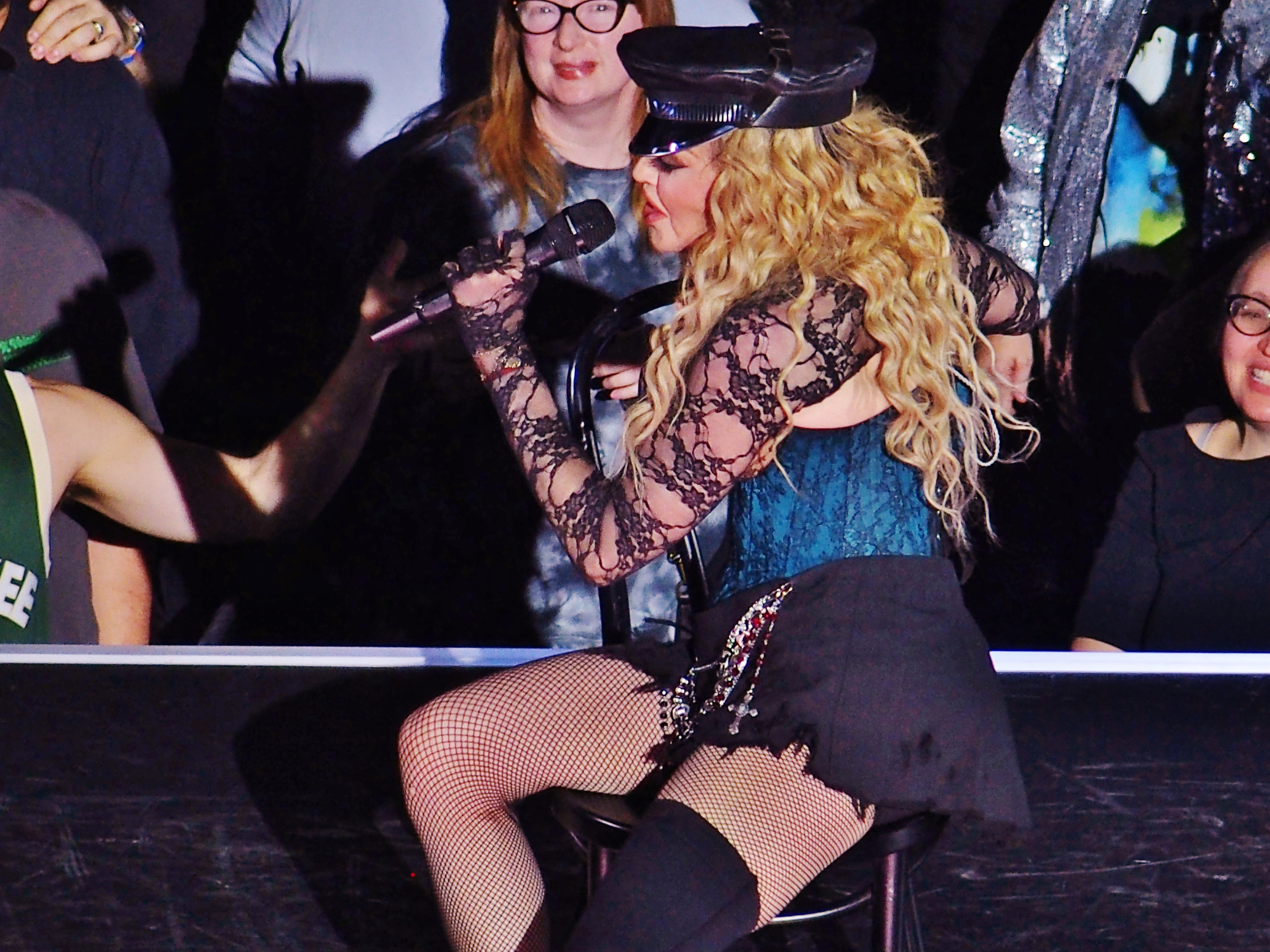
Madonna singing "Open Your Heart" on the Celebration Tour (2023―2024)

On the New Jersey and Las Vegas concerts of 2008's Sticky & Sweet Tour, Madonna did a capella renditions of "Open Your Heart" per the crowd's request. Lyrics of the song were then incorporated to the performance of "Frozen" (1998) on the tour's 2009 leg. On February 5, 2012, Madonna sang snippets of "Open Your Heart" during the Super Bowl XLVI halftime show, where she was joined by a marching band, and singer Cee Lo Green. On the MDNA Tour that same year, it was re-imagined as a folk number, relying only on drums and vocal harmonies, and mashed up with "Sagarra Jo!", a song by Basque band Kalakan. Madonna was joined by the band members themselves, and her son Rocco Ritchie. For Sal Cinquemani, it was one of the concert's "over-the-top triumphs". The performances of the song at the November 19–20 shows in Miami were recorded and released in the MDNA World Tour live album (2013).

At the 56th Annual Grammy Awards on January 26, 2014, Macklemore & Ryan Lewis sang their song "Same Love" (2012) as Queen Latifah acted as the officiant for 33 couples who were getting married right there in the ceremony; then, Madonna emerged dressed in a white Ralph Lauren suit to sing "Open Your Heart". The following year later, during the Manchester concert of her Rebel Heart Tour on December 14, Madonna sang the single a capella in a moment that had "everyone singing along", according to the Manchester Evening News' Katie Fitzpatrick. On July 27, 2017, Madonna performed "Open Your Heart" at Leonardo DiCaprio's annual fundraising gala, held in Saint-Tropez, France. A "more insistent" "Open Your Heart" was sung on the Celebration Tour. The number had Madonna and the dancers playing a game of musical chairs, as noted by The Washington Post's Chris Richards, who added that the rendition evoked a "rumination on the pursuit and retention of fame" rather than "puppy-love adrenaline".

== Covers ==
A Spanish version of the song titled "Abre Tu Corazón" was recorded by Venezuelan rock singer Melissa, and included on her 1986 album Melissa III. Israeli singer Ofra Haza covered the song for the tribute album Virgin Voices: A Tribute To Madonna, Vol. 2 (2000). The following year, "Open Your Heart" was covered by Who's That Girl! for the album Exposed. In 2002, French–Dutch group Mad'House did a Eurodance take on the song for their album Absolutely Mad. That same year, in the opening sequence of the movie Crossroads, main character Lucy (Britney Spears) lip syncs to "Open Your Heart" using a spoon for a microphone. In 2004, a hi-NRG cover by In-Deep was included on Platinum Blonde NRG, Vol. 2: Nrgised Madonna Classics. In April 2010, Cory Monteith and Lea Michele performed a mashup of "Open Your Heart" and "Borderline" (1984) in "The Power of Madonna", the fifteenth episode of American television series Glee. Finally, in February 2023, British singer Sophie Ellis-Bextor sang "Open Your Heart" on the BBC Radio 2 program Piano Room.

== Track listings and formats ==
- US and Japan 7" single
1. "Open Your Heart" – 4:12
2. "White Heat" – 4:25
- US 12" single
1. "Open Your Heart" (extended version) – 10:35
2. "Open Your Heart" (dub) – 6:43
3. "White Heat" – 4:25
- UK 7" single
1. "Open Your Heart" (7" remix) – 3:59
2. "Lucky Star" (7" edit) – 3:44
- UK 12" single / UK limited edition 12" picture disc
1. "Open Your Heart" (extended version) – 10:35
2. "Open Your Heart" (dub) – 6:43
3. "Lucky Star" – 5:33
- 2024 digital single
1. "Open Your Heart" – 4:13
2. "Open Your Heart" (remix/edit) – 3:59
3. "Open Your Heart" (extended version) – 10:37
4. "Open Your Heart" (dub) – 6:42

== Credits and personnel ==
Credits and personnel are adapted from the True Blue album liner notes, and the US twelve-inch single liner notes.

- Madonna – lead vocals, background vocals, songwriter
- Gardner Cole – songwriter
- Peter Rafelson – songwriter
- Jonathan Moffett – drums
- Paulinho da Costa – percussion
- David Williams – guitar
- Patrick Leonard – keyboard
- Herb Ritts – photography
- Jeri McManus – art direction
- Kim Champagne - design

== Charts ==
=== Weekly charts ===
Weekly chart performance for "Open Your Heart"
Chart (1986–1987)	Peak position
Australia (Kent Music Report)	16
Austria (Ö3 Austria Top 40)	18
Belgium (Ultratop 50 Flanders)	6
Canada (The Record)	4
Canada Top Singles (RPM)	8
Denmark (IFPI)	2
El Salvador (IFPI)	1
European Hot 100 Singles (Music & Media)	4
European Airplay Top 50 (Music & Media)	1
Finland (Suomen virallinen lista)	19
France (SNEP)	24
Germany (GfK)	17
Iceland (RÚV)	4
Ireland (IRMA)	2
Italy (Musica e dischi)	5
Netherlands (Dutch Top 40)	7
Netherlands (Single Top 100)	6
New Zealand (Recorded Music NZ)	12
Switzerland (Schweizer Hitparade)	11
UK Singles (Official Charts)	4
US Billboard Hot 100	1
US Adult Contemporary (Billboard)	12
US Dance Club Songs (Billboard)	1
US Dance Singles Sales (Billboard)	3
US Cash Box Top 100	1
US Radio & Records CHR & Pop Charts	1

=== Year-end charts ===
1986 year-end chart performance for "Open Your Heart"
Chart (1986)	Position
UK Singles (OCC)	91

1987 year-end chart performance for "Open Your Heart"
Chart (1987)	Position
Belgium (Ultratop 50 Flanders)	71
Brazil (Brazilian Radio Airplay)	72
Canada Top Singles (RPM)	68
European Hot 100 Singles (Music & Media)	54
US Billboard Hot 100	30
US Dance Club Songs (Billboard)	24
US Cash Box Top 100	16

== Certifications and sales ==
Certifications and sales for "Open Your Heart"
Region	Certification	Certified units/sales
Japan (Oricon Charts)	—	12,180
United Kingdom (BPI)	Silver	250,000^{^}
United States 12-inch format (By July 1987)	—	75,000
^{^} Shipments figures based on certification alone.

== Bibliography ==
- Andersen, Christopher (1992). Madonna: Unauthorized. Simon & Schuster. ISBN 0-671-73532-2.
- Bego, Mark (2000). Madonna: Blonde Ambition. Cooper Square Press. ISBN 978-0-8154-1051-5.
- Bronson, Fred (2003). The Billboard Book of Number 1 Hits. Billboard Books. ISBN 0-8230-7677-6.
- Clerk, Carol (2002). Madonnastyle. Omnibus Press. ISBN 0-7119-8874-9.
- Cross, Mary (2007). Madonna: A Biography. Greenwood Publishing Group. ISBN 978-0-313-33811-3.
- Dirks, Nicholas B.; Eley, Geoff; Ortner, Sherry B. (1994). Culture/power/history: A Reader in Contemporary Social Theory. Princeton University Press. ISBN 0-691-02102-3.
- Easlea, Daryl (2012). Madonna: Blond Ambition. Backbeat Books. ISBN 9781617130342.
- Forbes, Bruce David; Mahan, Jeffrey H. (2005). Religion and Popular Culture in America. University of California Press. ISBN 0-520-24689-6.
- Fouz-Hernández, Santiago; Jarman-Ivens, Freya (2004). Madonna's Drowned Worlds. Ashgate Publishing, Ltd. ISBN 0-7546-3372-1.
- Gabriel, Mary (2023). Madonna: A Rebel Life. Hachette UK. ISBN 978-0316456449.
- González Álvarez, Alexis Jesus (2016). De la FM a la Web (in Spanish). Lulu.com. ISBN 9781326556563.
- Guilbert, Georges-Claude (2002). Madonna as Postmodern Myth. McFarland. ISBN 0-7864-1408-1.
- McKeen, William (2000). Rock and roll is here to stay. W. W. Norton & Company. ISBN 0-393-04700-8.
- O'Brien, Lucy (2007). Madonna: Like an Icon. Bantam Press. ISBN 978-0-593-05547-2.
- Pascal, Julia; Sartori, Serena; Coluccini, Renata (1995). Women in Theatre. Routledge. ISBN 3-7186-5598-5.
- Pollock, Bruce (2014). Rock Song Index: The 7500 Most Important Songs for the Rock & Roll Era. Routledge. ISBN 9781135462963.
- Rettenmund, Matthew (1995). Encyclopedia Madonnica. St. Martin's Press. ISBN 0-312-11782-5.
- Rooksby, Rikky (2004). The Complete Guide to the Music of Madonna. Omnibus Press. ISBN 0-7119-9883-3.
- Taraborrelli, Randy J. (2002). Madonna: An Intimate Biography. Simon & Schuster. ISBN 0-7432-2880-4.
- Welton, Donn (1998). Body and Flesh: A Philosophical Reader. Wiley-Blackwell. ISBN 1-57718-126-3.
