= The Veldt (band) =

Shoegaze Group from Raleigh, NC

- Origin: Raleigh, North Carolina, US
- Genres: Shoegaze
- Years active: 1986–present
- Labels: Capitol; Stardog; Mammoth; Mercury; Manimal Vinyl; Schoolkids; Optical Sounds; Stardog; Yesha; Disques Sinthomme; Little Cloud; 5BC
- Spinoffs: Apollo Heights
- Members: Daniel Chavis; Danny Chavis; Hayato Nakao; Alex Cox; Martin Newman
- Past members: Marvin Levi; Joe Boyle; Dave Burris; Sam Clowney; Des White; Frank Olson; Michael Simone; Emory Ball; Micah Gaugh; Dale W Miller; LG Galleon

The Veldt is an American shoegaze band formed in 1986 in Raleigh, North Carolina by the identical twin Chavis brothers, vocalist and rhythm guitarist Daniel and lead guitarist Danny. The band took their name from a Ray Bradbury science fiction story. After signing with Capitol Records in 1989, the group went on to tour America opening for such groups as The Jesus and Mary Chain and the Cocteau Twins, whose member Robin Guthrie produced their initial recordings. Their 1994 album Afrodisiac is viewed as a classic of the shoegaze genre. The band currently consists of the Chavis brothers, Hayato Nakao on third guitar, Alex Cox on bass, and Martin Newman on fourth guitar.

The Veldt have received media coverage from outlets including Pitchfork, Vice, The Guardian, The Huffington Post, All Music Guide, Louder Than War, Stereogum, and many others including praise from producers Joe Foster (My Bloody Valentine, The Jesus and Mary Chain), Robin Guthrie (Cocteau Twins), A.R. Kane, and Doc McKinney (The Weeknd, Drake), alongside collaborators including TV On The Radio, Mos Def and Lady Miss Kier (Deee-Lite), and acts they have opened for such as The Brian Jonestown Massacre, The Pixies, Throwing Muses, Echo & The Bunnymen, Cocteau Twins, Manic Street Preachers, The Jesus and Mary Chain, Oasis, Modern English, Chameleons UK, Chuck D, Living Colour, and Schooly D.

The Chavis brothers relocated to New York City's East Village in the 1990s and later initiated the musical project Apollo Heights in the 2000s before returning to working under The Veldt moniker in the 2010s.

The Veldt are increasingly recognized as creating a path for marginalized voices and as an influence on the lineage of music that has led to the Alternative R&B success of The Weeknd and Miguel.

In 2026, Music On Vinyl announced a reissue of Afrodisiac on 2xLP under license from the album's catalog holder; The Veldt initially disputed the release before confirming it was properly licensed and announcing their own deluxe edition, featuring unreleased material, for 2027.

== History ==
Performing since they were children, the Chavis brothers' musical roots lead back to the church and southern juke-joints, and listening to music that included gospel, Motown and Pink Floyd. The Veldt's early years were spent in Raleigh during the late 1980s/early 1990s boom in North Carolina's independent music scene that included acts such as Superchunk, Archers of Loaf, Squirrel Nut Zippers, and Ryan Adams.

== Legacy and influence ==
Pitchfork included The Veldt's 1994 album Afrodisiac in their list of the top 50 shoegaze albums ever released, and Stereogum included a single from that album, "Until You're Forever" in their list of 31 essential shoegaze tracks. The Veldt's sound also inspired future alternative artists, including TV On the Radio and Bloc Party, and are regarded as an influence on the sound of 21st century Alternative R&B chart topping artists.

== Band members ==
Current

- Daniel Chavis - vocals, rhythm guitar
- Danny Chavis - lead guitar
- Hayato Nakao - third guitar, bass, programming
- Alex Cox - bass
- Martin Newman - fourth guitar

Live

- Todd Demma - drums (few songs only)

Former

- Marvin Levi - drums
- Joe Boyle - bass
- Dave Burris - third guitar
- Sam Clowney - lead guitar
- Des White - third guitar
- Frank Olson - third guitar
- Michael Simone - third guitar
- Emory Ball - drums
- Micah Gaugh - keyboards, saxophone
- Dale Miller - drums
- LG Galleon - third guitar

== Discography ==
=== Albums ===
- Afrodisiac (1994)
- Universal Boat (1996)
- Love At First Hate (1998)
- White Music For Black People (2007) – as Apollo Heights
- Entropy Is The Mainline To God (2022)
- Illuminated 1989 (2023)

=== EPs ===
- Marigolds (1992)
- Sad Cabaret Reverie (2011) - as Apollo Heights
- The Shocking Fuzz Of Your Electric Fur - The Drake Equation (2017)
- Check Your Mind (2022)
- Electric Revolution (Rhythm and Drone) (2022)
- SPANAKOPITA (2026)

=== Singles ===
- "CCCP" (1992)
- "Soul In A Jar" (1993)
- "Symmetry" (2017)
- "Black Girl" (2026)
