= Siddhartha (band) =

American rock band

- Origin: Detroit, Michigan
- Years active: 2003–present
- Labels: Neurotic Yell
- Members: Marlon Hauser; Eric Alonzo; Jesse Olswang; Max Guirand

Siddhartha is an American band formed in 2003, led by singer-songwriter Marlon Hauser continued the tradition of Detroit garage icons such as the MC5, The Stooges, and The Gories. The group recorded a full-length album with Jim Diamond which was never officially released, however in 2006 some of those recordings surfaced as a bootleg EP titled War Is Tragic.

== History ==
In 2007, Siddhartha appeared on the compilation album Through the Wilderness as a digital only download for the Manimal Vinyl label. Also that same year, Mick Collins of the Dirtbombs produced the single The Fashion Victims. In 2008 after a move to San Francisco and a lineup change, Manimal Vinyl would sign the band and issue the single/EP titled The Birth Book which featured the Madonna cover, Holiday as a B-side.

Marlon Hauser would later add new musicians for the San Francisco incarnation of the project. The group would record a new album titled If It Die which was released on the Neurotic Yell label. If It Die was a culmination of various influences ranging from the obvious materials that had influenced Hauser's writing style in addition to pulling heavily from early Sonic Youth, Radiohead, and the grunge sound of the 90's. Their album was met with favorable reviews appearing on numerous top 10 lists, and music blogs, there was even a new genre hybrid called Dashiki-Shoegaze that was bestowed upon the band. Despite the fact that If It Die isn't really a shoegaze album at all. All of this led to more notoriety for them in Europe where ironically there is the metal group called Siddharta. Despite the respect Siddhartha receives in the indie world, it continues to be one of the more off-the-grid music groups.

== Members ==
- Marlon Hauser — vocals, guitar, accordion, violin
- Eric Alonzo — bass, arrangements
- Jesse Olswang — drums, percussion
- Max Guirand — guitar, vocals

== Former Members ==
- Michael Pelot - bass

== Discography ==
=== Studio albums ===
- Siddhartha (2006)
- If It Die (2012)

=== Extended plays ===
- War Is Tragic (2006)

=== Singles ===
- "The Birth Book" (2008)
