= Bruce Forbes =

American minister

Bruce David Forbes (born March 30, 1948) is an ordained minister in the United Methodist Church. Born in Michigan, he grew up in Mitchell, South Dakota. His parents, Ernest Linwood Forbes and Marie Louise Forbes, met in Rochester. Ernie eventually became a hospital administrator at Methodist Hospital in Mitchell. Marie was a mathematics teacher as well as a librarian. Forbes resides in Sioux City, Iowa and has one son, Matthew Forbes.

Bruce Forbes holds a BA in religious studies from Morningside College, an MTh from Perkins School of Theology at Southern Methodist University, and a PhD from Princeton Theological Seminary. His formal academic training is in the history of Christianity, but he has also developed a special interest in the analysis of popular culture. Forbes is a former department chair and professor of religious studies at Morningside College in Sioux City, Iowa.

He is the co-editor of two books: Religion and Popular Culture in America (2000, second edition in 2005, third edition in 2017), co-edited with Jeffrey H. Mahan, and Rapture, Revelation and the End Times: An Exploration of the Left Behind Series (2004), co-edited with Djeanne Halgren Kilde. He is also the author of two non-fiction books: Christmas: A Candid History (2007) and America's Favorite Holidays: Candid Histories (2015).
