= Apollo Heights =

American shoegazing band

Apollo Heights is an American shoegaze band that was formed in New York City in 2002. Consisting mainly of twin brothers Daniel and Danny Chavis, they play experimental rock music and self describe their music as Afrogaze. They cite AR Kane and My Bloody Valentine as a major inspiration. Their debut album, White Music for Black People, was produced by Robin Guthrie of Cocteau Twins and features guest appearances from Mos Def, Lady Kier, David Sitek of TV on the Radio, Mike Ladd and Guthrie himself on guitar. The Chavis brothers were members of the alternative soul group The Veldt, who released three albums on Polygram, Mammoth and Capitol Records. Apollo Heights have released music under the labels Manimal Vinyl and Disques Sinthomme. Apollo Heights have appeared on various compilation albums such as Through the Wilderness and Jneiro Jarel's Return of the Shoegaze.

== Discography ==
=== Studio albums ===
- White Music for Black People CD (2007; Manimal Vinyl)

=== EPs ===
- Disco Lights EP digital single (2007; Manimal Vinyl)
- Babytalkk EP digital single (2008; Manimal Vinyl)
- Everlasting Gobbstopper EP digital single (2008; Manimal Vinyl)
- Sad Cabaret Reverie EP digital single (2011; Disques Sinthomme)
