= Through the Wilderness =

Compilation album by Various artists
- Released: November 27, 2007
- Recorded: 2007
- Genres: Psychedelic; folk
- Length: 59:09
- Label: Manimal Vinyl

Manimal Vinyl chronology
Fur and Gold (2006)	Through the Wilderness (2007)	White Music For Black People (2007)

Through the Wilderness is a tribute album with contributions from a variety of artists dedicated to American singer Madonna. It was released on November 27, 2007, by Los Angeles-based Manimal Vinyl Records. According to label head Paul Beahan, the idea for the album was conceived by him in a dream. He enlisted multiple artists to work on the project, including Giant Drag, Lavender Diamond, Winter Flowers and Chapin Sisters. Although he is not a fan of Madonna, Beahan wanted to see how her songs would sound when covered by different musicians.

Through the Wilderness is a psychedelic-folk tribute to Madonna without adhering to any particular coherent sound. The cover songs were composed differently from the original versions by the performers; they changed the melody of the Madonna tracks by tweaking the lyrics and re-interpreting the actual meaning. Music critics both complimented and criticized the songs, noting the strength of Madonna's discography in the album's tracklist.

== Background and release ==
[The album] is the first music scene out of the good 4 or 5 I've been involved in that I truly feel that way—and I've been doing this for at least 15 years. This particular collective... people call it freak folk, whatever it's just this great group of people and I felt in a weird way that y'know Madonna would really get along with these people.

— Paul Beahan talking about Through the Wilderness.

In February 2007, Los Angeles-based Manimal Vinyl record company announced its plan of releasing a compilation album containing cover versions of songs by American singer Madonna. Initial artists listed in the roster included Devendra Banhart, Giant Drag, Lavender Diamond, and VietNam, among others. Manimal Vinyl label head Paul Beahan confirmed that 25% of the profit earned from the album sales would be donated to Madonna's Raising Malawi foundation. Named Through the Wilderness, the record was the third project to be released by the company. It was originally reported to be released on September 4, 2007, but was delayed until November 27, 2007. Special release parties were organized in Los Angeles and New York, featuring the artists who recorded songs for the project.

Beahan had been thinking of releasing a tribute record through his company for a long time, following the death of musicians Arthur Lee and Syd Barrett in 2006. However, he changed his mind and instead chose Madonna, believing her songs could be recorded as serious-sounding tracks, thereby eliminating chances of it being a novelty release. The idea for Through the Wilderness originated from an epiphany Beahan had about Madonna. Although not a fan of the singer, he was intrigued about how her songs would sound when treated by alternative musicians. "The Madonna tribute came to me in a dream last fall, and I immediately started making calls and emails to Winter Flowers, Chapin Sisters, and Banhart asking them to record a song for it," Beahan clarified to Spin magazine.

Banhart and VietNam were not included in the final track list of the album. Other artists mentioned by Beahan for the record, but not included, were Cat Power and Thurston Moore. Through the Wilderness is a psychedelic-folk tribute to Madonna, with the songs spanning her entire career until that point, from "Lucky Star" (1984) to "Hung Up" (2005). The title is a reference to the opening line of Madonna's "Like a Virgin" where she sings, "I made it through the wilderness..." Beahan had asked all the bands to pick their own songs. He suggested to the Chapin Sisters to record "Borderline" instead of "Like a Virgin". Becky Stark of Lavender Diamond wanted to sing "Like a Prayer" for the album. Similarly, Lion of Panjshir sent a demo of "Crazy for You" which the label head accepted. Indie rock band Giant Drag confirmed on their official website that they were recording Madonna's "Oh Father" for the release. Rock musician The Prayers covered "Cherish" for the project.

== Composition ==
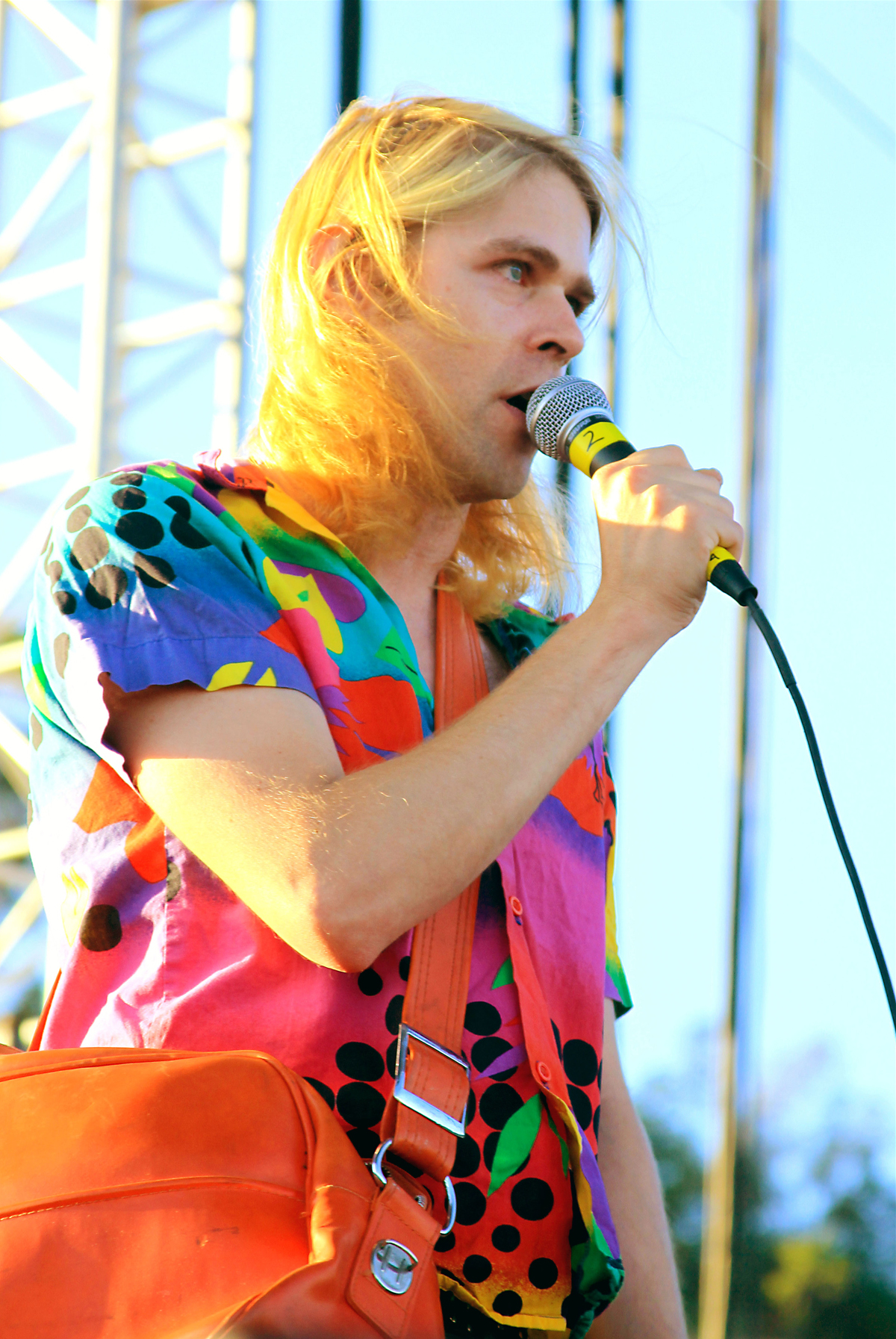
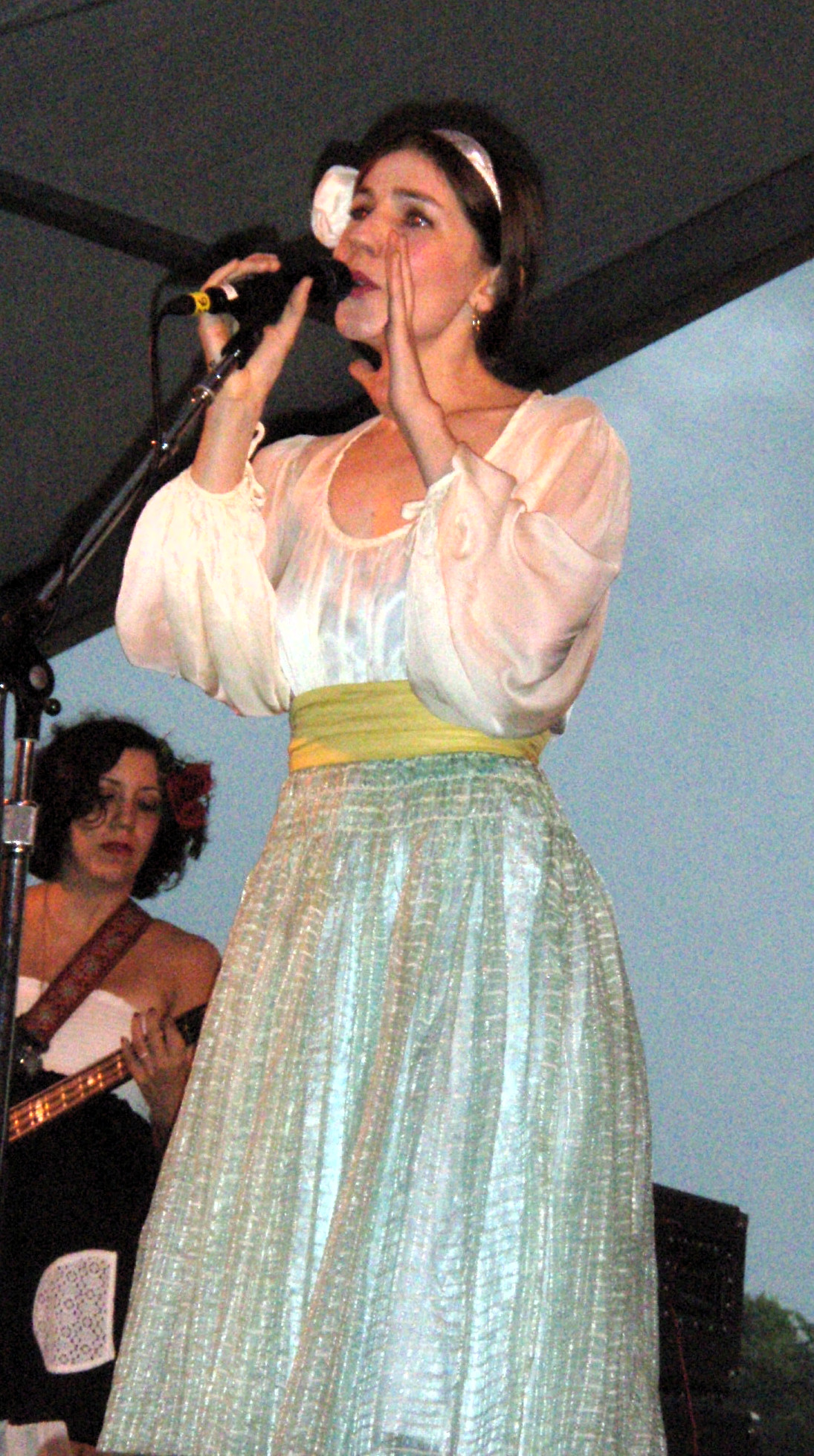
Ariel Pink (left) covered Madonna's "Everybody", while Lavender Diamond (right) covered "Like a Prayer"

The groups covering the songs changed the melody of the original Madonna tracks, by tweaking the lyrics and re-interpreting the actual meaning. According to Stephen M. Deusner from Pitchfork Media, the album did not have a particular or coherent sound and it "doesn't get bogged down in musical proselytizing or cultural weight-shifting". The synthpop-influenced covers of "Into the Groove" and "Everybody" by Jeremy Jay and Ariel Pink, respectively, were given as examples by Deusner, emphasizing the post-punk era of the songs, but still being different enough from Madonna's versions. The former added layers of synths and spoken echoing verses while the latter featured vocals from Julia Holter backed by keyboards and drums.

Through the Wilderness opens with Jonathan Wilson's piano version of "La Isla Bonita" whose chorus consists of a 1970s electric guitar against a reverb. "Borderline" featured vocal harmonies by the Chapin Sisters with percussion and banjos as instrumentation. Lavender Diamond's cover of "Like a Prayer" is a low-key version, but vocals and instrumentation are given equal importance. Giant Drag's "Oh Father" sticks to the original Madonna composition, but adds piano, bass and chimes.

A guitar-influenced version was created by Golden Animals, who turned "Beautiful Stranger" into a swamp blues track by removing the chorus and making it reminiscent of songs by Creedence Clearwater Revival. A freak folk recording of "Lucky Star" was composed by Alexandra Hope, while Lion of Panjshir included a multi-array of instruments in "Crazy for You" like sitar, tabla and acoustic guitar, with lead singer Ariana Delawari belting in breathy vocals. The Crosby, Stills, Nash & Young-influenced version of "Live to Tell" was created by the Winter Flowers, with "desert sunset atmosphere, noodly guitar fills, epic solos, and gorgeous harmonies sung by [lead singers] Astrid Quay and Gavin Toler".

== Critical reception ==
Professional ratings
Review scores
Source	Rating
Spin	3.5/5 stars

Deusner gave the album a rating of 7 out of 10, complimenting the release by adding that, "Madonna is an ideal candidate for the tribute album treatment, having already inspired several in the past but none [are] quite as sturdy or as much fun as Through the Wilderness". However he felt that few of the songs were "uninspired", like Drag's version of "Oh Father" and Bubonic Plague's rendition of "Who's That Girl." Jon Caramanica from Spin also gave a positive review, saying that the album captures "Madonna's vivacious side, but [reminds that she was] desperate too". He particularly commended "Crazy for You", saying that "the last 30 seconds of [the track is] chilling—frontwoman Ariana Delawari and her traditional Afghan backing accelerate feverishly, breaking the sweat Madonna never quite did, or could".

Bruce Scott from Prefix rated the album 6 on 10, and opined that "in patches" the record holds up well as a tribute release. He listed the tracks "Into the Groove", "Everybody" and "La Isla Bonita" as highlights, but criticized the cover of the ballads which he felt diminished the quality. "Through the Wilderness reminds that these [tracks] can withstand some reinventing no matter how minimal or lo-fi the arrangement, because the songs themselves are strong," Scott concluded.

Chris Morgan from Treble noticed the lack of coherence in the album, but complimented the attention bestowed on giving prominence to the "hook and peppiness" of the songs. However, he still found that "be it because their sound is not right for covering such an act or because they let their imagination run a little too wild for the sake of the art of reinterpretation, the creativity is vulnerable to quickly becoming a gimmick." He listed "Oh Father" and "Like a Prayer" as two highlights, describing them as the "most resonant".

== Track listing ==
CD version
No.	Title	Writer(s)	Performer(s)	Length
1.	"La Isla Bonita"	Madonna; Patrick Leonard; Bruce Gaitsch	Jonathan Wilson	4:41
2.	"Into the Groove"	Madonna; Stephen Bray	Jeremy Jay	3:42
3.	"Beautiful Stranger Blues"	Madonna; William Orbit	Golden Animals	2:48
4.	"Live to Tell"	Madonna; Leonard	Winter Flowers	6:16
5.	"Material Girl"	Peter Brown; Robert Rans	Mountain Party	3:39
6.	"Everybody"	Madonna	Ariel Pink	2:49
7.	"Oh Father"	Madonna; Leonard	Giant Drag	5:03
8.	"Hung Up"	Madonna; Stuart Price; Benny Andersson; Björn Ulvaeus	The Tyde	3:49
9.	"Lucky Star"	Madonna	Alexandra Hope	3:16
10.	"Borderline"	Reggie Lucas	Chapin Sisters	3:48
11.	"Who's That Girl"	Madonna; Leonard	Bubonic Plague	3:42
12.	"Dress You Up"	Andrea LaRusso; Peggy Stanziale	Apollo Heights	3:30
13.	"Cherish"	Madonna; Leonard	The Prayers	3:12
14.	"Crazy for You"	John Bettis; Jon Lind	Lion of Panjshir	4:01
15.	"Like a Prayer"	Madonna; Leonard	Lavender Diamond	4:53
Total length:				59:09

== Personnel ==
Credits and personnel adapted from AllMusic.

- Apollo Heights – producer, performer
- Linda Beecroft – drums, vocals
- P. Brown – composer
- Bubonic Plague – producer, performer
- Justin Burrill – audio engineer, engineer
- The Chapin Sisters – producer, performer
- Abigail Chapin – choir/chorus, guitar, keyboards, vocals
- Lily Chapin – banjo, keyboards, vocals
- Daniel Chavis – vocals
- Danny Chavis – guitar
- Jessica Craven – vocals
- Ariana Delawari – guitar, vocals
- Erica García – producer, instrumentation
- Micah Gaugh – bass, keyboards
- Giant Drag – performer
- Golden Animals – performer
- Steve Gregoropoulos – guitar, piano
- Max Guirand – engineer, slide guitar
- Annie Hardy – vocals
- Tim Hogan – bass
- Julia Holter – vocals (background)
- Alexandra Hope – performer
- Dan Horne – audio engineer, engineer, mixing, tambourine
- Jeremy Jay – arranger, producer, performer
- Tom Carney Myung Hi Kim – engineer
- Ben Knight – guitar (classical), guitar (electric)
- Lavender Diamond – performer
- Lion of Panjshir – performer
- Max Guirand – audio engineer, producer
- Andrew Miller – guitar, vocals
- Ethan Miller – producer
- Thom Monahan – producer, beat box, drum machine, engineer
- Mountain Party – performer
- Michael Mussmano – producer
- Ofer Tiberin – producer
- Ariel Pink's Haunted Graffiti – arranger, producer, performer
- Heather Porcaro – choir/chorus
- Prayers – producer
- The Prayers – performer
- Astrid Quay – Artwork, vocals
- Darren Rademaker – guitar (acoustic), vocals
- Ron Regé Jr. – drums
- Charles Rowell – bass
- Josh Schwartz – guitar (acoustic), guitar (Electric)
- Aaron Sperske – drums
- Becky Stark – audio engineer, vocals
- Chad Stewart – drums
- Tom Kim – audio engineer, producer
- The Tyde – performer
- Julian Wass – audio engineer, producer, engineer
- Jonathan Wilson – producer, performer
- Jonathan Wilson – arranger
- Winter Flowers – producer, performer
- Kenny Woods – audio engineer
- Gideon Zaretsky – producer
