= Mad'House =

French/Dutch Eurodance group

- Origin: France / Netherlands / Turkey
- Genres: House, Eurodance, hi-NRG
- Years active: 2002
- Labels: BMG, Digidance, Doo Beat Shoo Records, Vale Music, ARS Productions
- Past members: Mukendi M'Bambi Adolphe; Stéphane Durand; Buse Ünlü

Mad'House was a French/Dutch/Turkish Eurodance group made up of Mukendi M'Bambi Adolphe (DJ, music producer), Stéphane Durand (French pronunciation: [stefan dyʁɑ̃]; producer), and Buse Ünlü (vocalist; born 30 December 1981 (age 44)). They were known for creating cover versions of Madonna songs. The group was only active through most of 2002. They disbanded in October of that year.

Their cover single, "Like a Prayer", was a #1 hit in Germany, The Netherlands, Austria and Ireland.

== History ==
Mad'House was formed in the spring of 2002, inspired and influenced by the Internet mashup, "You Are Like a Prayer to Me" which featured Madonna and Black Legend.

Their debut single, "Like a Prayer", sold many copies throughout Europe. Mad'House later made "Into the Groove" and "Holiday", two more Madonna cover-based singles. Intent on capitalizing on the Netherlands-based success of their debut "Like a Prayer" single, Mad'House eventually went on tour throughout Europe.

"Like a Prayer" was a huge success in Europe as it reach #02 on Eurochart Hot 100 on 27 April 2002 despite still not having been released in all European markets by then. That same week it also reach #01 on European Dance Traxx (a chart that monitors the songs most played at European Dance Clubs) for the first week (despite still only being #45 on main European airplay showing mostly was played at Dance Clubs and not so much at the radios). It eventually peak #14 at European Airplay Chart but on Dance Traxx chart spent 6 non-consecutive weeks at #01 (and even more weeks at #02) being a huge Club hit in Europe. "Like a Prayer" even made it to 2002 Year End #07 on Eurochart Hot 100 Sales and #30 Top 50 Year End showing how big mainstream hit it end up being across Europe.

The 2nd single "Holiday" despite not doing as good all over Europe still spent 2 weeks at #05 peak on European Dance Traxx Chart.

On 12 July 2002 Mad'House debut their first and only studio album "Absolutely Mad" on European Top Albums at #12 - mostly fueld by the album debut at #03 in French Album Charts that week.

In October 2002, Mad'House began touring but never went outside Europe. After their last concert, Buse Ünlü departed the group and retired from recording music, due to the early birth of her son, on 17 August the same year. Mad'House disbanded sometime in late 2002.

== Discography ==
=== Studio albums ===
Title	Album details	Peak chart positions						
Title	Album details	AUT	BEL	FRA	GER	NDL	SWE	SWI
Absolutely Mad	Released: 2 September 2002; Label: Universal Licensing Music	13	19	3	12	54	30	12

=== Singles ===
Year	Single	Peak chart positions											Album
Year	Single	AUS	AUT	BEL	DEN	FRA	GER	IRE	NED	SWE	SWI	UK	Album
2002	"Like a Prayer"	53	1	2	18	5	1	1	2	18	2	3	Absolutely Mad
2002	"Holiday"	—	19	15	—	10	23	19	17	53	18	24	Absolutely Mad
2002	"Like a Virgin"	—	55	31	—	55	67	—	56	—	98	—	Absolutely Mad
