= List of Billboard number-one dance/disco singles of 1985 =

Billboard magazine compiled the top-performing dance singles in the United States on the Hot Dance/Disco Club Play chart and the Hot Dance/Disco 12-inch Singles Sales chart. Premiered in 1976, the Club Play chart ranked the most-played singles on dance club based on reports from a national sample of club DJs. It was the sole chart for dance music before the issue dated March 16, 1985, when the 12-inch Singles Sales chart was launched based on retail sales of physical singles across the United States. The first number one on the dance sales chart was "New Attitude"/"Axel F", a split single by Patti LaBelle and Harold Faltermeyer from Beverly Hills Cop soundtrack. However, Billboard had already compiled unpublished chart for the 12-inch singles sales chart since January 19, 1985, with "Rain Forest"/"Sound Chaser" by Paul Hardcastle as its first number one, which was retrospectively listed on Billboard.com.

== Charts history ==
Chart history
Issue date	Hot Dance/Disco Club Play		Hot Dance/Disco 12-inch Singles Sales		Ref.
Issue date	Title	Artist(s)	Title	Artist(s)	Ref.
January 5	"Like a Virgin"	Madonna	Not issued		
January 12	"We Are the Young"	Dan Hartman	Not issued		
January 19	"We Are the Young"	Dan Hartman	"Rain Forest" / "Sound Chaser"	Paul Hardcastle	
January 26	"Loveride"	Nuance featuring Vikki Love	"Rain Forest" / "Sound Chaser"	Paul Hardcastle	
February 2	"Sidewalk Talk"	Jellybean	"Rain Forest" / "Sound Chaser"	Paul Hardcastle	
February 9	"Loverboy"	Billy Ocean	"Sugar Walls"	Sheena Easton	
February 16	"Smalltown Boy"	Bronski Beat	"Sugar Walls"	Sheena Easton	
February 23	"Sugar Walls"	Sheena Easton	"New Attitude"/ "Axel F"	Patti LaBelle/ Harold Faltermeyer	
March 2	"This Is My Night"	Chaka Khan	"New Attitude"/ "Axel F"	Patti LaBelle/ Harold Faltermeyer	
March 9	"New Attitude"/ "Axel F"	Patti LaBelle/ Harold Faltermeyer	"New Attitude"/ "Axel F"	Patti LaBelle/ Harold Faltermeyer	
March 16	"New Attitude"/ "Axel F"	Patti LaBelle/ Harold Faltermeyer	"New Attitude"/ "Axel F"	Patti LaBelle/ Harold Faltermeyer	
March 23	"Bad Habits"	Jenny Burton	"New Attitude"/ "Axel F"	Patti LaBelle/ Harold Faltermeyer	
March 30	"Material Girl"	Madonna	"New Attitude"/ "Axel F"	Patti LaBelle/ Harold Faltermeyer	
April 6	"In My House"	Mary Jane Girls	"New Attitude"/ "Axel F"	Patti LaBelle/ Harold Faltermeyer	
April 13	"In My House"	Mary Jane Girls	"New Attitude"/ "Axel F"	Patti LaBelle/ Harold Faltermeyer	
April 20	"Point of No Return"	Exposé	"We Are The World"	USA for Africa	
April 27	"Point of No Return"	Exposé	"We Are The World"	USA for Africa	
May 4	"Fresh"	Kool & the Gang	"We Are The World"	USA for Africa	
May 11	"Everybody Wants to Rule the World"	Tears for Fears	"We Are The World"	USA for Africa	
May 18	"Everybody Wants to Rule the World"	Tears for Fears	"Fresh"	Kool & the Gang	
May 25	"Do You Wanna Get Away"	Shannon	"Everybody Wants to Rule the World"	Tears for Fears	
June 1	"Do You Wanna Get Away"	Shannon	"I Wonder If I Take You Home"	Lisa Lisa and Cult Jam with Full Force	
June 8	"Call Me Mr. Telephone (Answering Service)"	Cheyne	"I Wonder If I Take You Home"	Lisa Lisa and Cult Jam with Full Force	
June 15	"I Wonder If I Take You Home"	Lisa Lisa and Cult Jam with Full Force	"Angel"/ "Into the Groove"	Madonna	
June 22	"Thinking About Your Love"	Skipworth & Turner	"Angel"/ "Into the Groove"	Madonna	
June 29	"Angel"/ "Into the Groove"	Madonna	"Angel"/ "Into the Groove"	Madonna	
July 6	"19"	Paul Hardcastle	"Angel"/ "Into the Groove"	Madonna	
July 13	"19"	Paul Hardcastle	"Angel"/ "Into the Groove"	Madonna	
July 20	"Glow"	Rick James	"19"	Paul Hardcastle	
July 27	"Glow"	Rick James	"19"	Paul Hardcastle	
August 3	"Freeway of Love"	Aretha Franklin	"Angel"/ "Into the Groove"	Madonna	
August 10	"Freeway of Love"	Aretha Franklin	"Angel"/ "Into the Groove"	Madonna	
August 17	"Freeway of Love"	Aretha Franklin	"Raspberry Beret" / "She's Always In My Hair"	Prince & the Revolution	
August 24	"Shout"	Tears for Fears	"Trapped"	Colonel Abrams	
August 31	"Shout"	Tears for Fears	"Trapped"	Colonel Abrams	
September 7	"Trapped"	Colonel Abrams	"Shout (Remix)"	Tears for Fears	
September 14	"Eight Arms to Hold You"	Goon Squad	"Shout (Remix)"	Tears for Fears	
September 21	"Dare Me"	The Pointer Sisters	"Pop Life" (Remix) / "Hello"	Prince & the Revolution	
September 28	"Be Near Me"	ABC	"Pop Life" (Remix) / "Hello"	Prince & the Revolution	
October 5	"Be Near Me"	ABC	"Dress You Up" (Remix)	Madonna	
October 12	"Oh Sheila"	Ready for the World	"Dress You Up" (Remix)	Madonna	
October 19	"Fall Down (Spirit of Love)"	Tramaine	"Dress You Up" (Remix)	Madonna	
October 26	"You Wear It Well"	El DeBarge with DeBarge	"Dress You Up" (Remix)	Madonna	
November 2	"You Wear It Well"	El DeBarge with DeBarge	"I'll Be Good"	Rene & Angela	
November 9	"You & Me"	The Flirts	"Part-Time Lover" (Remix)	Stevie Wonder	
November 16	"Part-Time Lover"	Stevie Wonder	"Conga"	Miami Sound Machine	
November 23	"Who's Zoomin' Who"	Aretha Franklin	"Part-Time Lover" (Remix)	Stevie Wonder	
November 30	"A Love Bizarre"	Sheila E.	"I Like You"	Phyllis Nelson	
December 7	"A Love Bizarre"	Sheila E.	"I Like You"	Phyllis Nelson	
December 14	"I Like You"	Phyllis Nelson	"I Like You"	Phyllis Nelson	
December 21	"Takes a Little Time"	Total Contrast	"I Like You"	Phyllis Nelson	
December 28	"Baby Talk"	Alisha	"I Like You"	Phyllis Nelson	

== See also ==
- 1985 in music
- List of Billboard Hot 100 number ones of 1985
