= 1991 (Drop Nineteens album) =

Studio album by Drop Nineteens
- Released: February 7, 2025
- Recorded: 1991
- Genre: Shoegaze
- Length: 41:37
- Label: Wharf Cat

Drop Nineteens chronology
Hard Light (2023)	1991 (2025)

Singles from 1991
- 1. "Daymom" Released: October 15, 2024

1991 (Note: Stylized as Nineteen Ninety One on physical releases.) is the fourth studio album by American shoegaze band Drop Nineteens. It was released on February 7, 2025, by Wharf Cat Records.

== Background ==
The album was originally planned for release in 1991 as the band's debut album. It was later cancelled in favor of the 1992 album, Delaware, due the band's lead singer, Greg Ackell, deciding against rerecording it which he described as lacking studio "fidelity". Consisting of nine songs, the album is known as a lost tape and composed of tracks from the band's first two demo sessions that were sent to record labels when the band was unsigned. It was released on February 7, 2025, and its lead single "Daymom" was released on October 15, 2024.

== Reception ==
Professional ratings
Aggregate scores
Source	Rating
Metacritic	80/100
Review scores
Source	Rating
AllMusic	4/5 stars
Beats Per Minute	82%
Pitchfork	7.6/10
Spectrum Culture	73%

1991 was met with "generally favorable" reviews from critics. At Metacritic, which assigns a weighted average rating out of 100 to reviews from mainstream publications, this release received an average score of 80, based on 4 reviews.

AllMusic gave 1991 a four-star rating, stating, "On 1991, they're rescued from limbo in a time capsule that captures the feel of the era as well as Drop Nineteens' early days." Pitchfork rated the album 7.6 out of 10 in a joint review of 1991 and the 2024 reissue of Delaware.

== Track listing ==
All tracks are written by Drop Nineteens.

1991 track listing
No.	Title	Length
1.	"Daymom"	6:02
2.	"Song for JJ"	5:44
3.	"Back in Our Old Bed"	4:20
4.	"Soapland"	3:59
5.	"Mayfield"	2:55
6.	"Shannon Waves"	3:33
7.	"Kissing the Sea"	3:31
8.	"Snowbird"	5:39
9.	"Another Summer"	5:54
Total length:		41:37

== Personnel ==
Credits adapted from the album's liner notes and Tidal.

=== Drop Nineteens ===
- Greg Ackell – vocals, performance, recording, mixing
- Paula Kelley – performance, recording, mixing
- Motohiro Yasue – performance, recording, mixing
- Steve Zimmerman – performance, recording, mixing
- Chris Roof – performance, recording

=== Additional contributors ===
- Max Rose – mixing
- Carl Saff – mastering
