= Takes a Little Time =

Takes a Little Time may refer to:

- "Takes a Little Time" (Amy Grant song)
- "Takes a Little Time" (Total Contrast song)

== See also ==
- "Take a Little Time", a song by Jeremy Camp from Beyond Measure
