= Thinking About Your Love =

Thinking About Your Love may refer to:

- "Thinking About Your Love" (Kenny Thomas song), 1991
- "Thinking About Your Love" (Skipworth & Turner song), 1985
