= Sunset (Superbus album) =

Studio album by Superbus
- Released: 27 August 2012
- Studio: East West Studios, Los Angeles
- Genre: Power pop
- Label: Polydor, Universal
- Producer: Billy Bush

Superbus chronology
| Happy BusDay: The Best of Superbus (2010) | Sunset (2012) |

Singles from Sunset
- 1. "All Alone" Released: 21 May 2012

Sunset is the fifth studio album from French power pop group Superbus.

== Track listing ==
1. "All Alone"
2. "À la chaîne"
3. "Smith n’ Wesson"
4. "Mini"
5. "L’Annonce"
6. "Whisper" – feat. Richie Sambora
7. "Calling you"
8. "Mrs Better"
9. "Get real"
10. "Duo" – feat Marco Kamaras
11. "L’Été n’est pas loin"
