= Drop Nineteens =

American band

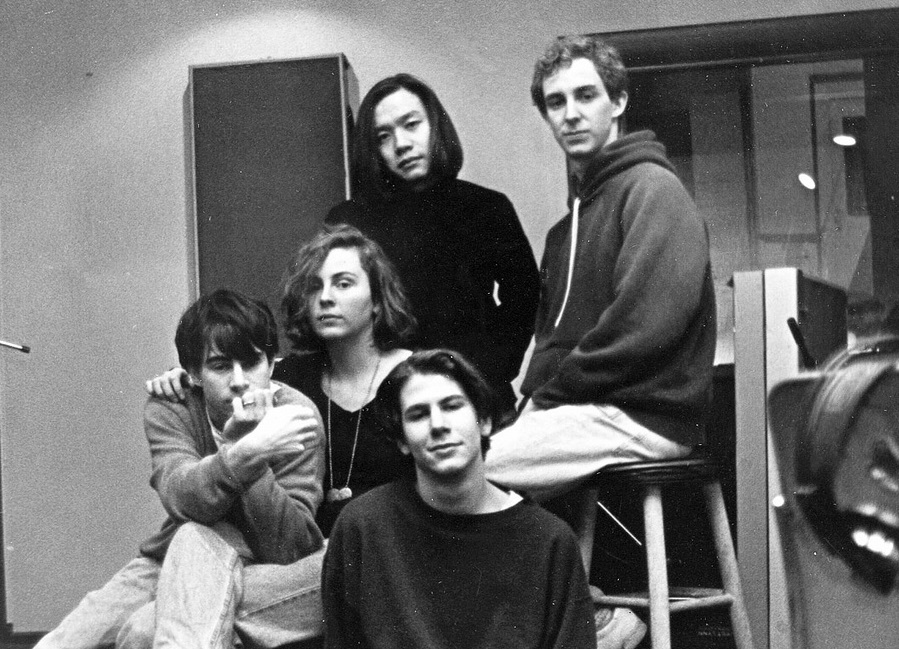

Background information
- Origin: Boston, Massachusetts, U.S.
- Genres: Shoegaze, noise pop, indie rock
- Years active: 1990–1995, 2022–present
- Labels: Caroline, Hut, Cherry Red, Virgin, Wharf Cat
- Members: Greg Ackell; Paula Kelley; Steve Zimmerman; Motohiro Yasue; Pete Koeplin
- Past members: Chris Roof; Justin Crosby; Megan Gilbert
- Website: dropnineteens.com

Drop Nineteens is an American shoegaze band from Boston, Massachusetts, formed in 1990. The band was formed by Boston University classmates Greg Ackell (vocals, guitar) and Chris Roof (drums), who recruited Paula Kelley (vocals, guitar), Motohiro Yasue (guitar) and Steve Zimmerman (bass). Ackell noted that the band was "the American outlier in a largely British scene."

Originally active from 1990 to 1995, the band underwent significant lineup changes following the release of their debut album Delaware in 1992. The band split in 1995 after releasing two albums. In 2022, Ackell announced Drop Nineteens' reformation, and the following year saw the band release their first new material in 30 years with their third album Hard Light.

== Overview ==
Drop Nineteens formed in 1990 at Boston University under the name April Rain, led by vocalist Greg Ackell. Ackell knew founding drummer Chris Roof from Northfield Mount Hermon School, a boarding school. Bassist Steve Zimmerman and lead guitarist Motohiro Yasue rounded out the band's initial lineup, with vocalist Paula Kelley as a guest musician. The band soon changed the name to Drop Nineteens, from a childhood memory of Ackell who would drop things off the terrace of his apartment, where he lived on the 19th floor.

The band first gained attention after releasing the Mayfield demo, which impressed NME and landed the band their first show, at the University of New Hampshire. It was followed up with the Summer Session demo. Cherry Red Records was the first label to offer them a deal, but Drop Nineteens ultimately signed with Caroline Records, who watched them perform a cover of Madonna's "Angel" while playing a show with Chapterhouse.

Drop Nineteens recorded their debut album Delaware in Boston's Cyclorama Building, the same studio where the Pixies recorded Doolittle, while the members were still in college. Lead single "Winona" earned play on MTV's 120 Minutes program, but the album sold more copies in Europe than in the States, and the band became resented by their peers in the Boston scene for getting popular without having paid their dues by playing local venues while obscure first. NME lumped the band into the growing "shoegaze" scene, and the band was able to fill 2,000-seat venues in London while recalling playing to only ten people in Cleveland. Radiohead and The Cranberries opened for Drop Nineteens that year.

The band recorded the Your Aquarium EP before departing on a European tour. After the final show, Kelley left the band, finding it emotionally isolating as the only woman in the group. Roof quit soon after. Drop Nineteens opened for The Smashing Pumpkins in Atlanta in 1993, and Yasue departed after that show. They were replaced by Megan Gilbert, Pete Koeplin and Justin Crosby, respectively. The members' departures were attributed to "rumored attitude problems and other typical musician disputes among the band."

For their second album National Coma, Ackell was tired of the band's constant comparisons to My Bloody Valentine and wanted to forge his own sound. Both Blondie keyboardist Jimmy Destri and Dinosaur Jr. frontman J Mascis were considered to produce the album, but neither worked out. The label had a difficult time choosing a single to promote it, ultimately settling on "Limp". Drop Nineteens played both the Reading Festival in England and Lollapalooza in North America that year, and opened for Blur on the North American Modern Life Is Rubbish tour as well as PJ Harvey's Rid of Me tour in France.

Following the National Coma tour in December 1993, Zimmerman and Gilbert left the band, leaving Ackell as the only founding member left. The band broke up for good in 1995.

In the late 1990s, Ackell and Koeplin recorded an album under the band name Fidel, which was never formally released. Kelley went on to front the bands Hot Rod and Boy Wonder, and performed as a solo artist with the Paula Kelley Orchestra.

In January 2022, Ackell announced that the Drop Nineteens had reunited and would release a new album later that year. The band's reunited lineup features Ackell, Steve Zimmerman, Pete Koeplin, Motohiro Yasue, and Paula Kelley. On August 2, 2023, the band released their first single in 30 years, "Scapa Flow", and announced that their third album Hard Light would be released through Wharf Cat Records on November 3 that year. On March 28, 2024, the band released a cover of Lana Del Rey's "White Dress" along with the B-side "Heat", which Ackell said was "the last song Drop Nineteens will be releasing for a while, or perhaps ever."

Drop Nineteens' first show in 30 years took place on April 17, 2024 at The Atlantis in Washington, D.C.

Drop Nineteens released a new single "Fools" on October 16, 2025. They are currently working on their upcoming fifth studio album.

== Influences ==
Ackell said that the band was influenced by My Bloody Valentine, Pixies, Dinosaur Jr., Sonic Youth, The Cure, New Order, The Go-Betweens and The Clash.

== In popular culture ==
The music of Drop Nineteens featured prominently in the American comedy television series The Adventures of Pete & Pete. British songwriter Owen Tromans included a song about Ackell and Drop Nineteens, entitled "Greg", on his 2013 EP For Haden.

== Members ==
=== Current members ===
- Greg Ackell – lead vocals, guitar (1990–1995, 2022–present)
- Paula Kelley – vocals, guitar (1990–1993, 2022–present)
- Motohiro Yasue – lead guitar (1990–1993, 2022–present)
- Steve Zimmerman – bass guitar (1990–1994, 2022–present)
- Pete Koeplin – drums (1993–1995, 2022–present)

=== Former members ===
- Chris Roof – drums (1990–1993)
- Justin Crosby – lead guitar (1993–1995)
- Megan Gilbert – vocals, guitar (1993–1994)

== Discography ==
=== Studio albums ===
- Delaware (1992, Caroline/Hut/Cherry Red)
- National Coma (1993, Caroline/Hut/Virgin) - US CMJ #24
- Hard Light (2023, Wharf Cat) - UK Record #24
- 1991 (2025, Wharf Cat)

=== Singles and EPs ===
- "Winona" single (1992, Hut)
- Your Aquarium CD/10"/12" EP (1992, Caroline/Hut)
- Limp 7"/12" EP (1993, Hut/Virgin; 1994, Caroline)
- "Scapa Flow" single (2023, Wharf Cat)
- "A Hitch" single (2023, Wharf Cat)
- "The Price Was High" single (2023, Wharf Cat)
- "Tarantula" single (2024, Wharf Cat)
- "Daymom" single (2024, Wharf Cat)
- "White Dress" single (2024, Wharf Cat)
- "White Dress (demo)" single (2025, Wharf Cat)
- "Fools" single (2025, Wharf Cat)

=== Demos ===
- Mayfield (1991, self-released)
