= Wow (Superbus album) =

Studio album by Superbus
- Released: 16 October 2006
- Recorded: 2006; ICP Studios, Brussels
- Genre: Electronic rock, power pop
- Length: 44:57
- Label: Mercury France, Universal
- Producer: Djoum, Superbus

Superbus chronology
Pop'n'gum (2004)	Wow (2006)	Lova Lova (2009)

Wow is the third studio album by the French power pop band Superbus. It was released on 16 October 2006 on Mercury Records. The album reached the sixth place on French album charts.

== Track listing ==
All tracks by Jennifer Ayache

1. "Le Rock à Billy" (Billy's Rock) - 2:01
2. "Ramdam" - 3:16
3. "Butterfly" - 3:52
4. "Over You" - 2:43
5. "Lola" - 2:58
6. "Tiens Le Fil" (Hold the Wire) - 2:01
7. "Un Peu De Douleur" (A Little Pain) - 2:47
8. "Let Me Hold You" - 3:15
9. "On Monday" - 4:21
10. "Travel the World" - 3:47
11. "Jenn Je T'aime" (Jenn I Love You) - 3:16
12. "Ça Mousse" (It's Frothing) - 3:11
13. "Bad Boy Killer" (bonus track) - 2:44
14. "Breath "(bonus track) - 3:45
15. "Heart of glass" (iTunes Bonus Track)
16. "Travel the World" (at Mme Krapabelle a frappe Bart Simpson concert) - 3:47

== Personnel ==
- Jennifer Ayache, a.k.a. Jenn. – vocals
- Patrice Focone, a.k.a. Pat. – guitar, backing vocals)
- Michel Giovannetti, a.k.a. Mitch. – guitar)
- François Even, a.k.a. Küntz. – bass, backing vocals)
- Greg Jacks, (drums)
