= Aéromusical =

Studio album by Superbus
- Released: 26 March 2002
- Genre: Rock, power pop
- Length: 37:35
- Label: Mercury France, Universal
- Producer: David Salsedo

Superbus chronology
Aéromusical (2002)	Pop'n'gum (2004)

Aéromusical is the first studio album by the French power pop group Superbus, released in 2002. It reached 96th place on the French album charts. It consists of 11 original songs and one cover ("Into the Groove", originally by Madonna).

== Track listing ==
All tracks by Jennifer Ayache except where noted.

1. "Je reste encore" – 2:29
2. "Superstar" (Ayache, Patrice Focone) – 3:14
3. "Tchi-cum-bah" – 2:23
4. "Le Soleil" – 3:30
5. "Le Loup" (Ayache, Focone) – 3:19
6. "Aéromusical" – 2:23
7. "Something Wrong" – 3:41
8. "Ennemie" – 2:45
9. "À travers toi" – 4:08
10. "Into the Groove" (Stephen Bray, Madonna Ciccone) – 2:51
11. "Helping hand" – 3:01
12. "Sans décrocher" – 3:51
13. "Miss Underground" –3:17
14. "No School Today" – 2:57

== Personnel ==
- Jennifer Ayache – acoustic guitar, voices, clavier, guiro
- Jimi D – digital engineer
- François Even – chorus, bass guitar
- Patrice Focone – electric guitar, slide guitar, chorus
- Michel Giovannetti – guitar, chorus
- Clive Martin – engineer, mixing
- Nilesh "Nilz" Patel – mastering
- Rodolphe Sampieri – assistant
