= Into the Groove =

1985 single by Madonna

Single by Madonna
- B-side: "Shoo-Bee-Doo"; "Physical Attraction"; "Everybody"
- Released: July 15, 1985
- Studio: Sigma Sound (New York City)
- Genre: Dance-pop
- Length: 4:43
- Label: Sire; Warner Bros.
- Songwriters: Madonna; Stephen Bray
- Producers: Madonna; Stephen Bray

Madonna singles chronology
"Angel" (1985)	"Into the Groove" (1985)	"Dress You Up" (1985)

Music video
- "Into the Groove" on YouTube

"Into the Groove" is a song by American singer Madonna, featured in the 1985 film Desperately Seeking Susan. Written by Madonna and Stephen Bray, it was originally intended for singer Cheyne before Madonna offered the recording to the film's director, Susan Seidelman, for a nightclub scene. The song was released in the United States on April 10, 1985, as the B-side of "Angel", and internationally as a standalone single on July 15. It was subsequently included on the 1985 reissue of Madonna's second studio album, Like a Virgin (1984).

Musically, "Into the Groove" is a dance-pop song built around synthesizers, drum beats, and a prominent bassline. Its lyrics celebrate the liberating power of dancing while exploring themes of romance and sexual desire. Produced by Madonna and Bray, it marked the singer's first production credit. The song received widespread critical acclaim, with reviewers praising its dance-oriented production and enduring appeal. It has frequently been ranked among Madonna's greatest recordings and was voted the best dance single of the 1980s in a 1990 readers' poll conducted by Billboard. It was also included on Rolling Stone's 2021 list of the 500 greatest songs of all time.

The song was ineligible to enter the Billboard Hot 100 because it was not commercially released as a standalone single in the United States. Nevertheless, it topped the Billboard dance charts alongside "Angel" and received a gold certification from the Recording Industry Association of America (RIAA). Internationally, the song reached number one in several countries, including the United Kingdom, Australia, Ireland, Italy, and the Netherlands, as well as on the European Hot 100 Singles chart. It became Madonna's first UK number-one single and remains her best-selling song in the country. A promotional music video was assembled using footage from Desperately Seeking Susan, while Madonna has performed the song on seven of her concert tours, the last being the Celebration Tour (2023–2024). "Into the Groove" has been covered by several artists, including Sonic Youth, Mina, and Superbus, and was sampled by Dannii Minogue for her 2003 single "Don't Wanna Lose This Feeling".

== Background ==
Originally titled "Get Into the Groove", the song was written by Madonna and Stephen Bray, while she was living on Avenue B in New York's Lower East Side. Producer Mark Kamins, a friend and former boyfriend of Madonna, had asked her to write a song for Cheyne, a 15-year-old singer he intended to sign. Madonna enlisted Bray, another former boyfriend and longtime collaborator, to help develop the song, and the two recorded a demo financed by Kamins. Madonna recalled that the song was partly inspired by an attractive Puerto Rican man she had spotted from her apartment. "There was this gorgeous Puerto Rican boy sitting across the street that I wanted to go out on a date with", she explained, adding that she was eager to finish writing the song so she could meet him. Her main inspiration, however, was the dance floor, which she described as a "magical place" where she could experience freedom and express herself through music.

In August 1984, Madonna was cast in Desperately Seeking Susan, a comedy directed by Susan Seidelman. More than 200 actresses had been considered for the title role, including Jennifer Jason Leigh, Melanie Griffith, and Kelly McGillis, but Seidelman favored Madonna, whom she knew from New York's downtown club scene. "I'd go to Danceteria and Paradise Garage occasionally, and I'd see her there", the director recalled. Despite her limited acting experience, Seidelman felt Madonna was well suited to play Susan, a free-spirited New Yorker whose personality closely resembled her own.

During filming, Seidelman needed music for a nightclub scene in which Madonna's character danced with Mark Blum's. She asked Madonna whether she had anything suitable, prompting her to bring in the existing demo of "Into the Groove" she had recorded with Bray. Seidelman felt the song suited the scene and decided to use the recording without having Madonna re-record it under conventional studio conditions. She also welcomed the fact that it had not yet been released, as the filmmakers had previously rejected the idea of including additional Madonna songs to avoid capitalizing on her growing popularity. The decision angered Kamins, who had financed the original demo for Cheyne and later discovered that Madonna had decided to use the song for the film without his knowledge.

== Recording and release ==
The original demo of "Into the Groove" was recorded in Madonna's Lower East Side apartment using a Tascam eight-track tape recorder. Bray handled the synthesizers and programming, while Madonna recorded her vocals through a Shure SM58 microphone. Recalling the makeshift recording conditions, Bray joked that the sounds of dogs barking and people shouting in the building's airshaft could be heard on the tape. Despite its inclusion in Desperately Seeking Susan, "Into the Groove" was omitted from its soundtrack because Madonna's record label, Sire, did not authorize its release.

The track was subsequently re-recorded at Sigma Sound Studios in New York, following revisions to parts of its lyrics by the singer and Bray. It marked Madonna's first production credit, which she shared with Bray. At the time, it was relatively uncommon for recording artists, particularly women, to produce their own music. Describing their collaboration, Bray compared the musical foundation he developed to a song's "rib cage and skeleton", while Madonna supplied the finishing touches, which he likened to "eyebrows and a haircut". He recalled that she often wrote lyrics as he worked on the music. Madonna also improvised the words to the song's bridge in the studio. During the sessions, Bray struggled with this section until Madonna spontaneously sang the line "Live out your fantasy here with me", an exchange witnessed by their friend, dancer Erika Belle.

Following the release of Desperately Seeking Susan in March 1985, "Into the Groove" attracted considerable attention, aided by the film's popularity and the frequent airing of its promotional video on MTV. Despite the growing demand for the song, Warner Bros. decided against releasing it as a standalone single in the United States, concerned that Madonna's existing singles would compete with one another. Instead, it was issued as the B-side of the twelve-inch single of "Angel", the third single from Madonna's second studio album Like a Virgin (1984), released on April 10. "Into the Groove" subsequently received an international single release on July 15, and was added to the 1985 reissue of Like a Virgin. The song was subsequently included on Madonna's compilation albums You Can Dance (1987), The Immaculate Collection (1990), Celebration (2009), and Finally Enough Love: 50 Number Ones (2022).

== Composition ==
=== Music and lyrics ===
Musically, "Into the Groove" is a dance-pop song characterized by prominent synthesizer basslines, drums, and repetitive synthesizer chords. The song opens with Madonna's spoken invitation, "And you can dance/for inspiration/come on/I'm waiting", before the drums and bass enter and lead into the first refrain. Her vocals are double-tracked and given a bright, treble-heavy sound, while a synthesizer melody provides a counterpoint to the main tune. During the bridge, Madonna harmonizes with herself in a lower vocal register.

The lyrics celebrate the liberating power of dancing while incorporating themes of romance and sexual desire. Madonna expresses the freedom she finds on the dance floor through the line "Only when I'm dancing can I feel this free", which The A.V. Club interpreted as a personal manifesto. The lyrics also contrast the privacy of dancing alone with the desire for companionship. In the pre-chorus, Madonna describes locking her door so that nobody can see her dance, before declaring her intention to find someone to dance with. Billboard interpreted this contrast as an empowering acknowledgment of the pleasure of dancing alone, while USA Today noted the sexual implications of the song's references to privacy.

"Into the Groove"
Audio sample of "Into the Groove", featuring the opening refrain, accompanied by prominent synthesizer basslines, drums, and repetitive synthesizer chords.

The song's romantic undertones become more explicit as Madonna invites a prospective partner to prove his love through dancing. The Guardian observed that the lyrics could be interpreted either as a celebration of dancing or as an invitation to sexual intimacy, particularly in the bridge, where Madonna sings "Touch my body/move in time/now I know you're mine". Similarly, Billboard argued that the song treats music, dancing, sex, and love as closely interconnected experiences.

=== Remixes ===
In 1987, "Into the Groove" was remixed by Shep Pettibone for Madonna's first remix album, You Can Dance, which also included a separate dub version of the song. Pettibone recalled that Warner Bros. executive Craig Kostich approached him about the project shortly after he had remixed "True Blue" (1986). Having initially hoped to remix "Into the Groove" instead of "True Blue", Pettibone was enthusiastic about the opportunity. He worked with the original multitrack recordings, incorporating additional production elements into the arrangement.

The resulting remix featured extensive overdubbing while retaining recognizable elements of the original recording. According to Robert Matthew-Walker, Madonna preferred the remix to the original version. Author Rikky Rooksby noted its emphasis on percussion and vocal sampling, particularly the repeated use of Madonna's spoken "c'mon", which builds into a percussion break approximately 90 seconds into the track. The arrangement also features overlapping vocal phrases, a piano passage reminiscent of Bruce Hornsby's style, and an extended ending incorporating congas and whistles, which Rooksby characterized as Mexican-influenced. In 2022, an edited version titled "You Can Dance Remix Edit" was included on Finally Enough Love: 50 Number Ones. This edit shortened the original eight-minute-plus remix while retaining its instrumental effects, stuttering vocals, and rhythmic embellishments

In 2003, Madonna collaborated with American rapper Missy Elliott on "Into the Hollywood Groove", a mashup of "Into the Groove" and "Hollywood" created for a television advertising campaign by clothing retailer Gap. The recording combined the beat of "Into the Groove" with lyrics from "Hollywood", alongside a new rap verse by Elliott promoting Gap jeans. The accompanying commercial featured both artists dancing together on a city-street set, with Madonna performing a modified version of the original song's refrain. The mashup was subsequently included on Madonna's second remix album, Remixed & Revisited (2003).

== Critical reception and recognition ==
"Into the Groove" has received widespread acclaim from music critics, many of whom have regarded it as one of Madonna's finest recordings. In a contemporary review of the twelve-inch single of "Angel", Cash Box singled out "Into the Groove" as the track "everybody's been waiting for", predicting that the release would appeal to both disc jockeys and consumers. For Select, Andrew Harrison described the song as an "incontrovertible" celebration of pop dance music, calling it "the most profound comment on pop in general". Rooksby considered it Madonna's "first great single", praising its ability to "make you feel like you're a winner". Biographer Daryl Easlea argued that while "Like a Virgin" and "Material Girl" had propelled Madonna toward superstardom, it was "Into the Groove" that "sealed the deal [...] it encapsulated the world's need to celebrate". AllMusic's Stacia Proefrock characterized it as an "infectious, fluffy dance-pop confection", noting that it attracted both a large following and criticism from listeners who considered themselves too sophisticated to appreciate Madonna's music.

Retrospective assessments have particularly praised the song's dance-oriented production and enduring appeal. Writing for The Arizona Republic, Ed Masley described it as the "definitive Madonna dance song", arguing that her subsequent dance recordings had never matched its energy. In this vein, Enio Chiola of PopMatters suggested that later songs such as "Vogue" (1990), "Deeper and Deeper" (1992), "Music" (2000), "Hung Up" (2005), and "Give It 2 Me" (2008) attempted to recapture its appeal. Matthew Jacobs of HuffPost characterized it as Madonna's "finest pre-'Vogue' dance-floor anthem" and the "ultimate mid-'80s call to action", while Louis Virtel of TheBacklot.com described it as "magnetic, comely, cool, and compulsively danceable". Consequence praised the song's uncomplicated invitation to dance and enjoy oneself, comparing its appeal to that of "Music", while Nicole Hogsett of Yahoo Voices called it "one of the most fun songs ever recorded".

Other critics have emphasized the song's significance within Madonna's career and its appeal as a pop recording. Andrew Unterberger of Billboard praised its empowering lyrics and enduring production, describing its pre-chorus as one of the greatest ever written and arguing that it exemplified Madonna's ability to celebrate the liberating power of dancing. Author Matthew Rettenmund called "Into the Groove" the "quintessential Madonna song", praising its "irresistible" dance rhythm and interpreting its lyrics as a celebration of music as a "near-religious" experience. He also highlighted Madonna's confident delivery and the playful references to her own desirability. Rik Flynn of Classic Pop suggested that the song proved music could indeed be a "revelation", while The Daily Telegraph regarded it as one of the singer's "defining" hits. Writing for Entertainment Weekly, Chuck Arnold wrote that despite its original release as the B-side of "Angel", "it's always been clear which of [the two] made the A-list". PinkNews praised its multilayered production and exuberance, describing it as an "irresistible, multi-layered masterpiece" and a "distillation of pure pop joy".

"Into the Groove" has appeared on numerous retrospective rankings of Madonna's greatest songs. Billboard, PopMatters, and PinkNews ranked it first, while Rolling Stone and Classic Pop placed it second. It was ranked fourth by The Arizona Republic and TheBacklot.com, fifth by The Daily Telegraph, sixth by Consequence, and ninth by Entertainment Weekly. The song has also received recognition beyond rankings of Madonna's discography. NME ranked it the 18th-best single of 1985, while a 1990 readers' poll conducted by Billboard voted it the best dance single of the 1980s. Slant Magazine ranked it 17th on its list of the greatest dance songs, praising the credibility of Madonna's performance and observing that, despite the difficulty of imagining her dancing alone in her bedroom, "you can't help but believe her". Rolling Stone ranked "Into the Groove" at number 161 on its 2021 list of the 500 Greatest Songs of All Time, and later placed it 91st on its list of the greatest dance songs. The Australian edition of the magazine ranked it 181st on its own list of the 500 greatest songs. The song was also included in Robert Dimery's 1001 Songs You Must Hear Before You Die and Bruce Pollock's Rock Song Index: The 7500 Most Important Songs for the Rock & Roll Era.

== Chart performance ==
Due to it being the B-side of "Angel" and the lack of a commercial seven-inch release in the United States, "Into the Groove" was ineligible to enter the Billboard Hot 100. Nevertheless, the release, billed as "Angel" / "Into the Groove", topped both Billboard's Dance Club Songs and Dance Singles Sales charts, and peaked at number 19 on the Hot Black Singles chart. It ranked fourth on Billboard's year-end Dance Singles Sales chart for 1985. On July 30, it was certified gold by the Recording Industry Association of America (RIAA) for shipments of one million copies in the United States. It was the only twelve-inch single to receive gold certification that year and the first since Frankie Smith's "Double Dutch Bus" (1981). By 2025, "Angel" / "Into the Groove" had sold more than one million copies in the United States. In 2023, Billboard ranked "Into the Groove" first on its list of the 100 best pop songs never to enter the Hot 100.

Internationally, "Into the Groove" achieved widespread commercial success. It debuted at number four on the UK Singles Chart on August 23, 1985, marking the highest debut for a female artist at the time. The following week, on August 30, it rose to number one, displacing Eurythmics' "There Must Be an Angel (Playing with My Heart)" and becoming Madonna's first UK chart-topper. It remained at the summit for four consecutive weeks, tying with "Vogue" and "4 Minutes" (2008) for her longest-running number-one single in the country. According to Music & Media magazine, it was WEA's fastest-selling single in five years. During its run, a reissue of "Holiday" (1983) reached number two, making Madonna the first female artist in UK chart history to occupy the top two positions simultaneously. Certified gold by the British Phonographic Industry (BPI), "Into the Groove" finished 1985 as the country's third best-selling single, behind Jennifer Rush's "The Power of Love", and "I Know Him So Well" by Elaine Paige and Barbara Dickson. "Into the Groove" remains Madonna's best-selling single in the United Kingdom, with 1.4 million copies sold and streamed, including 907,500 actual sales, as of 2025.

Elsewhere, "Into the Groove" topped the European Hot 100 Singles chart, as well as the national charts Ireland, Italy, Ir and the Netherlands. In Spain, it debuted at number ten on the Los 40 chart on October 12, 1985, and reached number one two weeks later, becoming Madonna's third chart-topper of the year, following "Material Girl" and "Angel". In Australia, the song was released as a double A-side with "Angel"; it reached number one and became the country's second best-selling single of 1985. "Into the Groove" also reached the top three in France, West Germany, and Switzerland, while entering the top 40 in Japan.

In March 2026, more than four decades after its original release, "Into the Groove" experienced a resurgence in popularity following a viral social media trend started by influencer Gymskin. The song re-entered the UK Singles Chart at number 40, marking its first appearance in the top 40 since 1985. The following week, it climbed to number 18, becoming Madonna's first solo top-20 hit in the UK since "Celebration" reached number three in 2009. The song also re-entered the Irish singles chart at number 24.

== Music video ==
No music video was filmed for "Into the Groove". Instead, a promotional clip was assembled using scenes from Desperately Seeking Susan and added to MTV's rotation during the week of March 30, 1985, subsequently receiving heavy airplay on the network. In his book Fast Times and Excellent Adventures: The Surprising History of the '80s Teen Movie, James King described the video as "a little incoherent" for viewers unfamiliar with the film, but considered its imagery "certainly memorable". He highlighted scenes of Madonna lying on a hotel bed, dancing in a nightclub, and using a hand dryer in a public restroom, characterizing her appearance as "punky confrontation with a disco pout and a postmodernist wink".

Media scholar John Fiske regarded the video as being "almost exclusively about style", interpreting its imagery as a reflection of Madonna's control over her public identity. He noted the use of photographic effects, including camera flashes and polaroid-style framing, as well as her combination of religious symbols, lingerie, and traditionally masculine clothing. According to Fiske, these elements allowed Madonna to appropriate visual conventions associated with masculinity and sexuality while asserting control over the construction of her own image, becoming "not only the product but also the producer". Julien Sauvalle of Out later included the clip among Madonna's most stylish music videos. It can be found on Madonna's 2009 video compilation Celebration: The Video Collection.

== Live performances ==
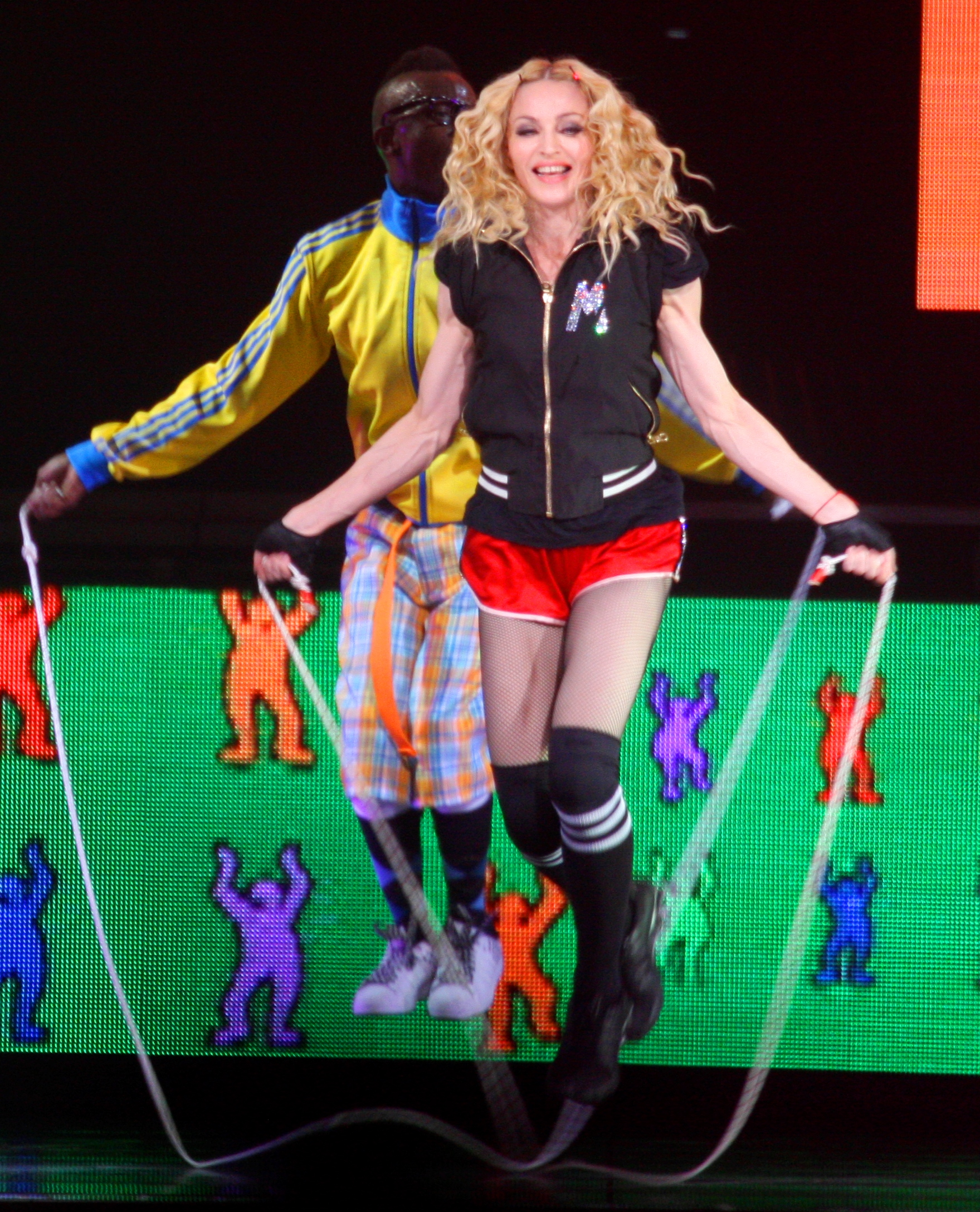
Madonna jumping rope during the performance of "Into the Groove" on the Sticky & Sweet Tour (2008–2009)

"Into the Groove" has been performed on seven of Madonna's concert tours: Virgin (1985), Who's That Girl (1987), Blond Ambition (1990), Re-Invention (2004), Sticky & Sweet (2008—2009), Rebel Heart (2015—2016), and Celebration (2023—2024). On the first, she performed wearing a sheer blue crop top over a black bra, a purple skirt, lacy leggings, and a patterned jacket adorned with crucifixes. She played a tambourine and was accompanied by two male dancers. The Observer–Reporter's Terry Hazlett called "Into the Groove" the concert's standout moment. A recording of the performance at Detroit's Cobo Arena was included in the tour's video release. On July 13, 1985, Madonna performed the song at the Philadelphia Live Aid benefit concert, where she jokingly remarked that she would not remove her jacket because "[the media] might hold it against me ten years from now".

The Who's That Girl World Tour's performance saw Madonna wearing a jacket decorated with colorful items, including a large letter "U" on one side, a Campbell's soup can on the other, and the word "DANCE" on the back. When she spun around, the design formed a pictograph spelling out "U Can Dance". The Washington Post's Richard Harrington called the number a "tingling" highlight. A performance from this tour was included on the video release Ciao Italia: Live from Italy (1988). On the Blond Ambition World Tour, Madonna sang "Into the Groove" wearing what author Carol Clerk described as a combination of a babydoll dress and cycling shorts. The number featured lambada-inspired dance moves with a male dancer and a safe-sex message delivered through a brief rap about condoms. A performance can be found on the tour's LaserDisc release.

For the Re-Invention World Tour, "Into the Groove" was reworked with a Scottish theme, featuring bagpipes, martial drums, and prerecorded rap vocals by Missy Elliott. Madonna and her dancers wore kilts, while a live bagpiper accompanied the number, including a passage during the song's bridge. Glenn Gamboa of Newsday felt that the dancers' intricate moves transformed the song from a "dance-pop trifle" into a "powerful dance piece". A recording of the performance appeared on the 2006 live album I'm Going to Tell You a Secret.

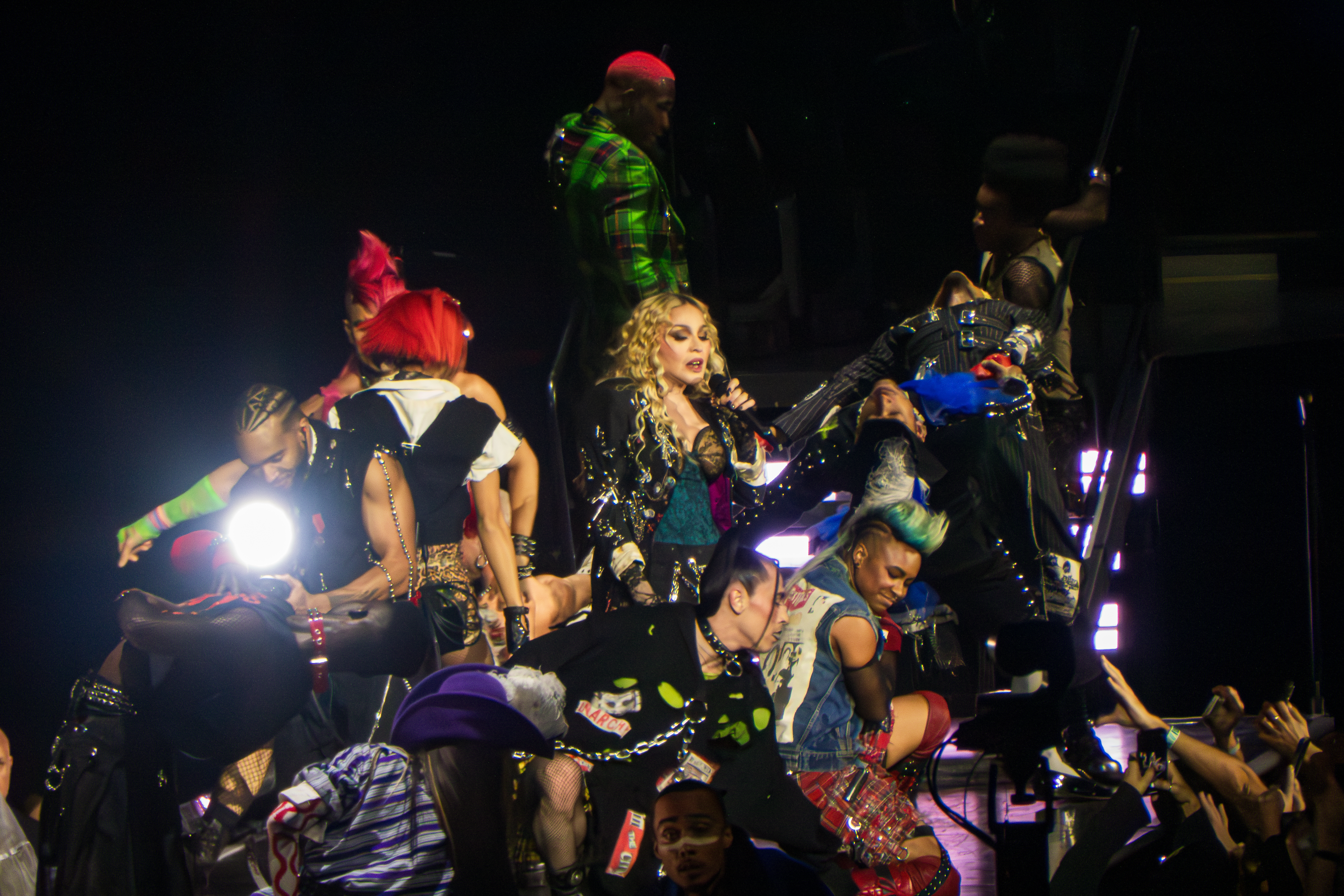
Madonna and her dancers performing "Into the Groove" on the Celebration Tour (2023–2024)

A "pumping" club remix of "Into the Groove" was performed on the Sticky & Sweet Tour, incorporating samples of Newcleus' "Jam on It" (1984) and the Sugarhill Gang's "Apache" (1981). Wearing red gym shorts and black socks, Madonna danced on a pole and performed Double Dutch while singing, as animated figures from Keith Haring's artwork appeared on large screens behind her. Ricardo Baca of The Denver Post called the number a "delightful explosion of color [...] pure pop goodness". A performance from Buenos Aires was captured for the tour's live album (2010).

"Into the Groove" was among the songs sampled in "Radio Dial Static", a video interlude featured on the MDNA Tour (2012). On the Rebel Heart Tour, it was included in a slow, Latin-inspired medley with "Dress You Up" (1985) and "Lucky Star" (1983), accompanied by Day of the Dead–themed visuals. Madonna performed wearing a black dress, hat, and shawl. Billboard's Joe Lynch praised the Spanish guitar arrangement, though he felt the maracas were "a little much". The number was included on the tour's 2017 video release.

For the Celebration Tour, the song was given a punk theme, incorporating elements of "Into the Hollywood Groove". Madonna performed wearing chains, a corset, and a short skirt, accompanied by dancers dressed in the style of the 1980s New York punk scene. The Chicago Tribune's Bob Gendron described the number as a throwback to a "buttoned-down era guided by conservative taboos". Despite its enduring popularity, Madonna admitted in a 2009 Rolling Stone interview that "Into the Groove" is a song she "feel[s] retarded singing".

== Cover versions and samples ==
Dannii Minogue (pictured in 2016) incorporated "Into the Groove" into her 2003 single "Don't Wanna Lose This Feeling", with Madonna's approval.

In 1988, American alternative rock band Sonic Youth, recording under the name Ciccone Youth, released a cover of "Into the Groove" titled "Into the Groovey". The recording incorporates samples of Madonna's vocals alongside Thurston Moore's singing. AllMusic's Bradley Torreano praised the band's reinterpretation, describing it as a "fantastic dirge" and highlighting the contrast between Moore's relaxed vocal delivery and Madonna's sampled voice. That same year, Italian singer Mina recorded her own version of "Into the Groove".

Dale Bozzio covered "Into the Groove" for the 2000 tribute album Virgin Voices: A Tribute to Madonna, Vol. 2. Two years later, Eurodance group Mad'House included a rendition on their album Absolutely Mad, while French pop rock band Superbus recorded the song for their debut album Aéromusical (2003). American singer Jeremy Jay contributed a cover to the tribute album Through the Wilderness (2007). Reviewing the compilation, Pitchfork's Stephen Deusner praised Jay's homemade interpretation for evoking the darker elements of post-punk without merely imitating Madonna's original. In 2013, "Into the Groove" was performed by Chris Colfer, Adam Lambert, and Demi Lovato in the Glee episode "Puppet Master".

In 2003, Australian pop artist Dannii Minogue became the first performer officially permitted to sample Madonna's music, incorporating "Into the Groove" into her single "Don't Wanna Lose This Feeling". Minogue recalled that she had expected Madonna to reject the request and was surprised by her immediate approval. In a 2018 interview, she remarked, "To this day I still can't believe it [...] 'Into the Groove' is just legendary". In contrast, Madonna publicly accused Canadian artist Tory Lanez in December 2021 of illegally sampling the song on his track "Pluto's Last Comet", from the album Alone at Prom. While it was never confirmed whether legal action was pursued, Madonna later told Rolling Stone, "I am tired of being taken advantage of and I mean business".

== Track listing and formats ==
- US and Australian twelve-inch single, and 2001 European CD single
1. "Angel" (extended dance remix) – 6:15
2. "Into the Groove" – 4:40
- European seven-inch single
1. "Into the Groove" – 4:40
2. "Shoo-Bee-Doo" – 5:14
- European twelve-inch single
1. "Into the Groove" – 4:40
2. "Everybody" – 4:40
3. "Shoo-Bee-Doo" – 5:14
- Japanese seven-inch single
1. "Into the Groove" – 4:40
2. "Physical Attraction" – 3:54
- 1989 mini CD
1. "Into the Groove" – 4:40
2. "Who's That Girl" (extended version) – 4:40
3. "Causing a Commotion" (Silver screen mix) – 4:40
- 2024 "Angel" digital EP
1. "Angel" (radio edit) – 3:43
2. "Angel" (extended dance mix edit) - 6:27
3. "Angel" (extended dance mix) – 6:33
4. "Into the Groove" – 4:43
- 2025 digital EP
1. "Into the Groove" – 4:43
2. "Into the Groove" (edit) – 4:09
3. "Into the Groove" (You Can Dance single edit) – 4:48
4. "Into the Groove" (You Can Dance unmixed full version) – 8:37
5. "Into the Groove" (dub version) – 6:23
6. "Shoo-Bee-Doo" – 5:17

== Credits and personnel ==
Credits are adapted from the Like a Virgin and You Can Dance album notes.

- Madonna – vocals, songwriter, producer
- Stephen Bray – songwriter, producer
- Shep Pettibone – additional production, audio mixing, audio editing
- Andy Wallace – remix engineering
- The Latin Rascals – audio editing
- Herb Ritts – photography

== Charts ==
=== Weekly charts ===
1985–1986 weekly chart performance for "Into the Groove"
Chart (1985–1986)	Peak position
Australian (Kent Music Report) with "Angel"	1
Austria (Ö3 Austria Top 40)	6
Belgium (Ultratop 50 Flanders)	1
European Hot 100 Singles	1
Finland (Suomen virallinen lista)	1
France (SNEP)	2
Ireland (IRMA)	1
Italy (Musica e dischi)	1
Japan (Oricon Singles Chart)	37
Netherlands (Dutch Top 40)	1
Netherlands (Single Top 100)	1
New Zealand (Recorded Music NZ)	1
Norway (VG-lista)	4
Spain (PROMUSICAE)	1
South Africa (Springbok)	4
Sweden (Sverigetopplistan)	3
Switzerland (Schweizer Hitparade)	2
UK Singles (Official Charts)	1
US Dance Club Songs (Billboard) with "Angel"	1
US Dance Singles Sales (Billboard) with "Angel"	1
US Hot R&B/Hip-Hop Songs (Billboard)	19
West Germany (GfK)	3

2022–2026 weekly chart performance for "Into the Groove"
Chart (2022–2026)	Peak position
Ireland (IRMA)	24
UK Singles (Official Charts)	18
US Dance Digital Song Sales (Billboard)	14

=== Year-end charts ===
1985 year-end chart performance for "Into the Groove"
Chart (1985)	Position
Australia (Kent Music Report) with "Angel"	2
Belgium (Ultratop 50 Flanders)	6
European Hot 100 Singles (Music & Media)	7
France (SNEP)	26
Netherlands (Dutch Top 40)	4
Netherlands (Single Top 100)	8
New Zealand (Recorded Music NZ)	4
Spain (PROMUSICAE)	10
Switzerland (Schweizer Hitparade)	9
UK Singles (Official Charts Company)	3
US Dance Club Songs (Billboard) with "Angel"	33
US Dance Singles Sales (Billboard) with "Angel"	4
West Germany (GfK)	21

2017 year-end chart performance for "Into the Groove"
Chart (2017)	Position
UK Vinyl Singles (Official Charts)	22

=== Decade-end charts ===
Decade-end chart performance for "Into the Groove"
Chart (1980–1989)	Position
Australia (Kent Music Report) with "Angel"	31
Netherlands (Dutch Top 40)	15
United Kingdom (Gallup)	30

== Certifications and sales ==
Certifications and sales for "Into the Groove"
Region	Certification	Certified units/sales
Canada	—	100,000
France (SNEP)	Gold	500,000^{*}
Greece (IFPI Greece)	—	4,000
Italy (AFI)	Gold	300,000
Japan (Oricon Charts)	—	152,440
New Zealand (RMNZ) Physical sales	Gold	10,000^{*}
New Zealand (RMNZ) Digital sales + streaming	Gold	15,000^{‡}
United Kingdom (BPI)	Platinum	907,500
United States (RIAA) with "Angel"	Gold	1,000,000^{^}
United States (RIAA)	Gold	500,000^{‡}
Summaries
Europe 1985 sales	—	1,500,000
^{*} Sales figures based on certification alone.^{^} Shipments figures based on certification alone.^{‡} Sales+streaming figures based on certification alone.

== Literary sources ==
- Bego, Mark (2000). Madonna: Blonde Ambition. Cooper Square Press. ISBN 978-0-8154-1051-5.
- Clerc, Benoit (2026). Madonna: All The Songs: The Story Behind Every Track. Octopus Publishing. ISBN 978-1-78840-635-2.
- Clerk, Carol (2012). Madonnastyle. Omnibus Press. ISBN 978-2-909828-89-3.
- Dimery, Robert (2013). 1001 Songs: You Must Hear Before You Die. Hachette. ISBN 978-1-84403-717-9.
- Easlea, Daryl (2012). Madonna: Blond Ambition. Backbeat Books. ISBN 978-1-61713-034-2.
- Fiske, John (1987). Television Culture. Routledge. ISBN 978-0-415-04284-0.
- King, James (2018). Fast Times and Excellent Adventures: The Surprising History of the '80s Teen Movie. Little, Brown and Company. ISBN 978-1-4721-2373-2.
- Matthew-Walker, Robert (1991). Madonna: The Biography. Sidgwick & Jackson. ISBN 978-0-330-31482-4.
- McAleer, Dave (2001). Hit Singles: Top 20 Charts from 1954 to the Present Day. Hal Leonard. ISBN 978-0-87930-808-7.
- Morton, Andrew (2002). Madonna. Macmillan Publishers. ISBN 978-1-85479-432-1.
- Pollock, Bruce (2005). Rock Song Index: The 7500 Most Important Songs for the Rock & Roll Era. Routledge. ISBN 978-0-415-97073-0.
- Rettenmund, Matthew (1995). Encyclopedia Madonnica. St. Martin's Press. ISBN 978-0-312-11782-5.
- Rooksby, Rikky (2004). The Complete Guide to the Music of Madonna. Omnibus Press. ISBN 978-0-7119-9883-4.
- Tortarolo, Renato; Sanlazzaro, Gabriele (2026). Mina È: Le Storie dentro le Canzoni (in Italian). Mondadori Electa. ISBN 978-88-510-8378-6.
