= Gymskin =

British live streamer (born 1994)

- Born: Jack Smith; Bow, London, England
- Occupation: online streamer
- Organization: Kick

Kick information
- Channel: gymskin
- Years active: 2025–present

Jack Smith, better known as Gymskin, is an English online streamer and influencer. He is known primarily for his Kick livestreams, and for his following on TikTok, where he has amassed over 1.3 million followers.

== Early life ==
Smith was born in the East End of London. He grew up in various parts of East London, including Bow, Newham, and Dagenham before moving to Brentwood.

== Career ==
Gymskin began his online presence as a fitness influencer, posting gym and looksmaxxing content, from which his online alias derives. He later pivoted to livestreaming on Kick, where he mainly films content walking through English towns and cities, especially his hometown of London and its eastern/Essex suburbs, often filming at Liverpool Street Station. He is known for his Cockney accent and use of the phrase “showing my boat race” when streaming in public. Clips from his streams are widely shared across TikTok and Instagram. He has also released music on Spotify and is known for a recurring segment in which he reviews coffee, often criticising baristas for having "burnt the bean".

In early 2026, Gymskin went viral after a video of him dancing to Madonna's 1985 single "Into the Groove" spread widely across social media. The video spawned the "follow that tune" TikTok trend and drove a significant resurgence in the song's chart performance, with "Into the Groove" re-entering the UK Singles Chart Top 20 for the first time in over 40 years, peaking at number 17 in March 2026.
