= Pop'n'gum =

Pop'n'Gum

Studio album by Superbus
- Released: June 2004
- Genres: Rock, power pop
- Length: 33:58
- Labels: Mercury France, Universal
- Producer: David Salsedo

Superbus chronology
Aéromusical (2002)	Pop'n'Gum (2004)	Wow (2006)

Pop'n'Gum is the second studio album by French power pop group Superbus. It reached the 26th place on French album charts. It was released in June 2004.

Its first single, Radio Song, is a playable bonus song on Guitar Hero III: Legends of Rock.

Celeste Rhoads of AllMusic rated it three out of five stars.

== Track listing ==
1. "Radio Song" – 2:24
2. "Pop'n'Gum" – 2:15
3. "Des Hauts, Des Bas" – 2:24
4. "Sunshine" – 3:23
5. "C'est Pas Comme Ca" – 2:35
6. "Little Hily" – 3:04
7. "Petit Detail" – 3:02
8. "Sex Baby Sex" – 2:42
9. "Beggin' Me To Stay" – 2:19
10. "Tu Respires" – 3:45
11. "Taboo" – 2:50
12. "Girl" – 3:11
13. "Monday to Sunday" (re-release bonus track)
14. "Boys don't cry" (re-release bonus track)
15. "Girl acoustic" (re-release bonus track)
16. "Radio Song acoustic" ( re-release bonus track)
17. "Shake" (re-release bonus track)

== Personnel ==
- Jennifer Ayache, aka Jenn. – vocals
- Patrice Focone, aka Pat. – guitar, backing vocals
- Michel Giovannetti, aka Mitch. – guitar
- François Even, aka Küntz. – bass, backing vocals
- Guillaume Roussé, aka Gul. – drums
