= Some Sucker's Life, Part 1: Demos and Lost Recordings =

Compilation album by Paula Kelley
- Released: April 2006
- Genre: Pop / Indie
- Label: Stop, Pop and Roll Records
- Producer: Paula Kelley

Paula Kelley chronology
The Trouble With Success or How You Fit Into The World (2003)	Some Sucker's Life, Part 1: Demos and Lost Recordings (2006)

Professional ratings
Review scores
Source	Rating
Allmusic	3.5/5 stars

Some Sucker's Life, Part 1: Demos and Lost Recordings is Paula Kelley's third solo album. The album is a collection of songs that were unreleased. It was released in April 2006.

== Track listing ==
1. "High Boots"
2. "Born to be a Star"
3. "Burnin' For You"
4. "Talk Away"
5. "B.S. I Love You"
6. "Firewalker"
7. "Your Big World"
8. "Over Your Head"
9. "Goodbye September"
10. "Life Isn't Fair"
11. "The Big Deal"
12. "Girl of the Day"
13. "Soaking"
14. "Damaged"
15. "You're Up"
16. "Untitled"
