= Nothing/Everything =

Studio album by Paula Kelley
- Released: 2001
- Genre: Pop, indie
- Label: Stop, Pop and Roll Records
- Producer: Paula Kelley

Paula Kelley chronology
A Bit Of Everything (2000)	Nothing/Everything (2001)	The Trouble With Success or How You Fit Into The World (2003)

Professional ratings
Review scores
Source	Rating
Allmusic	3/5 stars

Nothing/Everything is the debut album recorded by pop singer-songwriter Paula Kelley.

== Track listing ==
1. "Nothing/Everything"
2. "Two Possible Answers (The Road)"
3. "Everything Full"
4. "You Gonna Make It?"
5. "Nothing"
6. "All Request Hour"
7. "For Someone"
8. "Slug"
9. "Lucie"
10. "Girl of the Day"
11. "The Light Under the Door"
12. "Ordinary Mind"
13. "Showdown"
