= Lova Lova =

Studio album by Superbus
- Released: 8 February 2009; 26 October 2009 (reissue)
- Recorded: July–October 2008; Studio Acousti, Paris; Studio Ferber, Paris
- Genres: Electronic rock, power pop, synth-pop
- Length: 41:54
- Labels: Mercury France, Universal; Polydor, Universal (reissue)
- Producers: Charles De Schutter, Superbus

Superbus chronology
Wow (2006)	Lova Lova (2009)	Happy BusDay: The Best of Superbus (2010)

Singles from Lova Lova
- 1. "Addictions" Released: November 2008; 2. "Lova Lova" Released: March 2009; 3. "Nelly" Released: May 2009; 4. "Apprends-Moi" Released: September 2009

Lova Lova is the fourth studio album from the French power pop group Superbus. It was released on 9 February 2009 on Mercury Records. All tracks were composed by lead singer Jennifer Ayache, with the exception of one, composed by both Ayache and Patrice Focone.

The album will be available in both a standard version as well as a limited CD-book which includes a DVD. A re-issue was sold on 26 October with a new track list, three bonus tracks and a new cover and artwork.

== Track list of the first version ==
1. Nelly
2. Addictions
3. I Wanna Be U
4. Hello Hello
5. À La Verticale (Vertically)
6. Just Like The Old Days
7. Gogo Dance Show
8. London Town
9. Call Girl
10. Apprends-Moi (Teach Me)
11. Keyhole
12. Lova Lova
13. Rise (iTunes bonus track)

== Track list of the second version ==
1. Addictions
2. Keyhole
3. Apprends-Moi (Teach Me)
4. Just Like The Old Days
5. Gogo Dance Show
6. London Town
7. I Wanna Be U
8. Nelly
9. Hello Hello
10. À La Verticale (Vertically)
11. Call Girl
12. Lova Lova
13. Rise (New Mix)
14. Heart Of Glass
15. Nelly (Bedroom Version)

== Charts ==
Chart	Peak position
French Albums Chart	2
Switzerland Albums Chart	45
