= Hard Light =

Studio album by Drop Nineteens
- Released: November 3, 2023
- Genre: Shoegaze
- Length: 41:04
- Label: Wharf Cat
- Producer: Greg Ackell; Steve Zimmerman

Drop Nineteens chronology
National Coma (1993)	Hard Light (2023)

Singles from Hard Light
- 1. "Scapa Flow" Released: August 2, 2023; 2. "A Hitch" Released: September 13, 2023; 3. "The Price Was High" Released: October 19, 2023; 4. "Tarantula" Released: February 1, 2024

Hard Light is the third studio album by American shoegaze band Drop Nineteens, released on November 3, 2023, through Wharf Cat Records. It is their first full-length album in 30 years, and received positive reviews from critics.

== Background and recording ==
Vocalist Greg Ackell tweeted in January 2022 that he had written the majority of the album in drop C♯ tuning and that bass guitarist Steve Zimmerman had worked on several songs with him. It was recorded with the lineup that played on the band's debut album Delaware (1992), along with Peter Koeplin.

On August 2, 2023, Drop Nineteens announced the release of their third studio album, along with the first single "Scapa Flow". Speaking of the album, lead vocalist Greg Ackell said:

The intent on Delaware was to reflect that time in our lives, which I think it did accurately. Having considered Delaware before embarking on Hard Light, we wanted to make an honest, reflective album representing who we are now, which is, well, older. I've been struggling to find an answer to the question "why now?" What was the catalyst for getting back together after so long?

The second single "A Hitch" was released on September 13, 2023. The single was the first song the band wrote when they got together, which "set the tone for the rest of the album, for what a new Drop Nineteens song could sound like."

== Critical reception ==
Professional ratings
Aggregate scores
Source	Rating
Metacritic	78/100
Review scores
Source	Rating
AllMusic	4/5 stars
Exclaim!	6/10
The Line of Best Fit	8/10
Paste	7.8/10
Pitchfork	7.4/10
PopMatters	7/10
Uncut	7/10
Under the Radar	8.5/10 stars

Hard Light received a score of 78 out of 100 on review aggregator Metacritic based on 13 critics' reviews, indicating "generally favorable" reception. Uncut felt that "the likes of 'Scapa Flow' and 'Rose with Smoke' are assured orthodox shoegaze, while 'Tarantula' reflects a more playful, almost power-poppy tendency". JM Lacombe of Exclaim! stated that "Drop Nineteens have returned as a highly competent, often lovely, and perhaps less interesting version of themselves" as "though it makes a compelling enough case for Drop Nineteens' return, nothing on Hard Light sears and smoulders the same way Delaware's coarser passages did". AllMusic's Heather Phares called it "a much mellower, tenderer album than their debut" and although "Hard Light is far from Delaware's rollercoaster ride, [...] its update of that album's spirit should please the fans Drop Nineteens made in the decades since their debut".

John Amen of The Line of Best Fit remarked that the band "seem to have emancipated themselves from the artistic and commercial parameters they likely felt corralled by in the 1990s. Replete with the prerequisite blankets of fuzz, the set is also, in places, notably buoyant". Reviewing the album for PopMatters, Seth Troyer stated that it "feels like a love letter, not only to fans but from one group member to another" as "the music on this assured comeback record speaks for itself". Under the Radar's Michael James Hall described it as "a Christmas morning of an album, each track a new gift to treasure. It's a set of songs that bring you deep into them, a mist of musical vapor in which snapshot reminiscences can be made out as the fog wavers".

Devon Chodzin of Paste found Hard Light to be "elating, exhibiting the same sensibilities of Delaware with emotional depth and sonic maturation that makes it feel as if Drop Nineteens never left the scene". Reviewing the album for Pitchfork, Brad Shoup wrote that "with so much time gone, it would have been no surprise if Drop Nineteens had rehashed musical glories, or settled old scores. But when Hard Light does look backwards, it does so without triumph or disillusion, only tenderness".

== Track listing ==
All lyrics are written by Greg Ackell; all music is composed by Greg Ackell, Steve Zimmerman, Paula Kelley, Motohiro Yasue, and Peter Koeplin, except where noted.

Hard Light track listing
No.	Title	Length
1.	"Hard Light"	3:05
2.	"Scapa Flow"	3:59
3.	"Gal"	4:08
4.	"Tarantula"	3:13
5.	"The Price Was High"	3:34
6.	"Rose with Smoke"	2:31
7.	"A Hitch"	3:28
8.	"Lookout"	2:24
9.	"Another One Another"	4:49
10.	"Policeman Getting Lost" (arranged by Paula Kelley, music and lyrics by the Clientele)	2:28
11.	"T"	7:25
Total length:		41:04

== Personnel ==
Drop Nineteens

- Greg Ackell – vocals, guitar, production, artwork, design
- Paula Kelley – vocals, guitar
- Pete Koeplin – drums
- Motohiro Yasue – guitar
- Steve Zimmerman – bass guitar, production, engineering

Additional contributors

- Carl Saff – mastering
- Brian Charles – mixing
- Aaron Tap – additional engineering
- Max Rose – additional engineering, tenor saxophone and baritone saxophone on "T"
