= Angel (Madonna song) =

1985 single by Madonna

Single by Madonna

from the album Like a Virgin
- B-side: "Into the Groove"; "Burning Up"
- Released: April 10, 1985
- Recorded: 1984
- Studio: Power Station (New York City)
- Genre: Dance-pop
- Length: 3:56
- Label: Sire; Warner Bros.
- Songwriters: Madonna; Stephen Bray
- Producer: Nile Rodgers

Madonna singles chronology
"Crazy for You" (1985)	"Angel" (1985)	"Into the Groove" (1985)

Licensed audio
- "Angel" on YouTube

"Angel" is a song by American singer Madonna from her second studio album, Like a Virgin (1984). Written by Madonna and Stephen Bray and produced by Nile Rodgers, it was released on April 10, 1985, as the album's third single. A dance-pop song with new wave influences, "Angel" features synthesizers, layered vocal harmonies and lyrics in which Madonna compares a romantic interest to a heavenly being.

Upon release, the song received lukewarm reviews from music critics, some of whom considered it less memorable than Madonna's preceding singles and criticized her vocal performance. Retrospective assessments have been more favorable, with several commentators praising its production and regarding it as an underrated entry in her catalogue. Although a music video was planned, it was ultimately abandoned in favor of a promotional clip assembled from footage of her earlier videos.

Commercially, "Angel" reached number five on the US Billboard Hot 100, becoming Madonna's fifth consecutive top-five single. It also peaked at number five in Canada and the United Kingdom and reached the top 20 in several other countries. In the United States, its twelve-inch release featured "Into the Groove" as B-side, with the two songs jointly topping the Billboard Dance Club Songs chart. The pairing also reached number one in Australia, where it became the second-best-selling single of 1985. Madonna performed "Angel" during the Virgin Tour (1985), and the song was later covered by Drop Nineteens and Darren Hayes. In 2019, it was featured in the third season of the Netflix series Stranger Things.

== Background ==
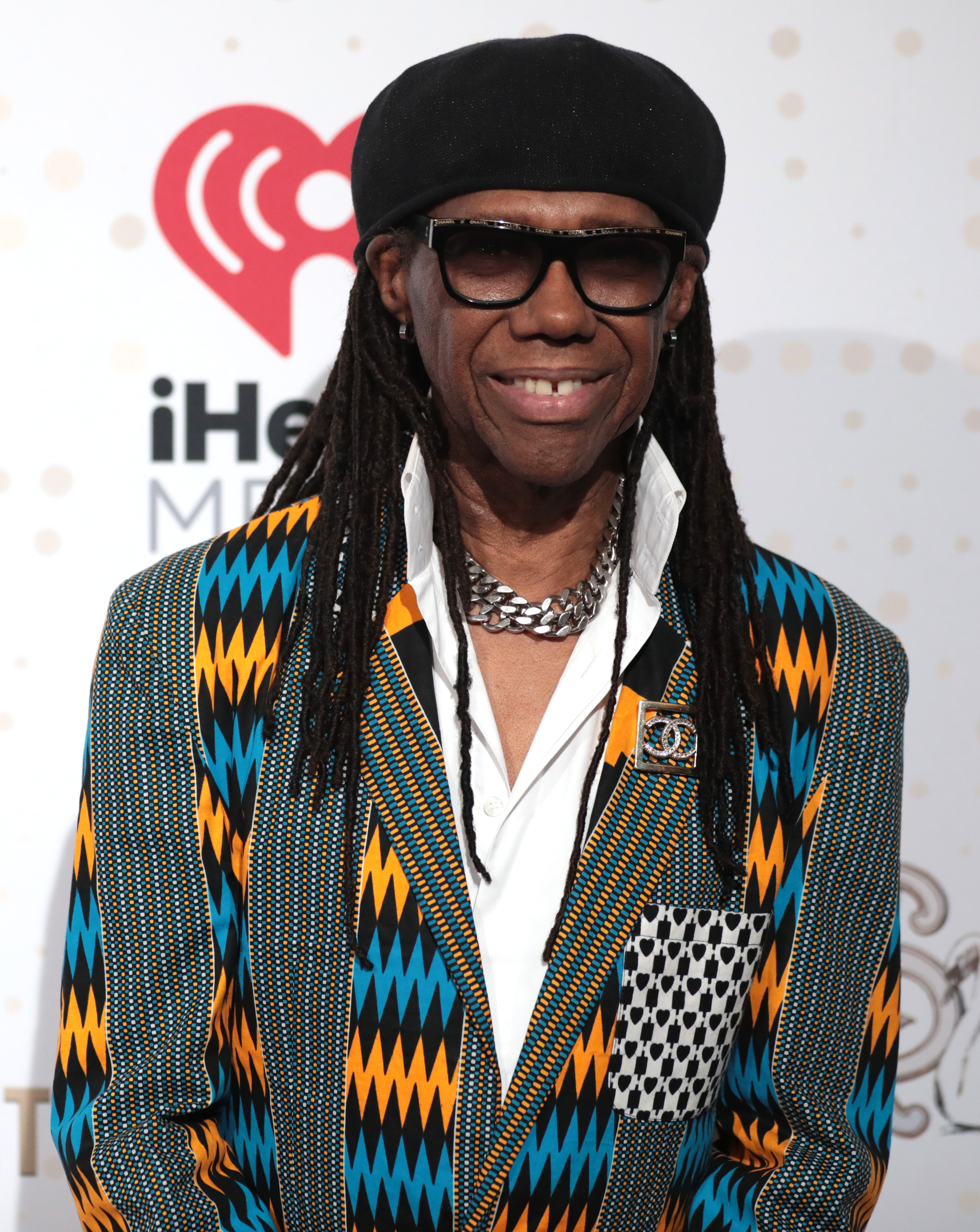
Nile Rodgers (pictured in 2023) produced "Angel".

Madonna released her self-titled debut album on July 27, 1983, which achieved commercial success and spawned several hit singles, including "Holiday" and "Borderline", the latter becoming her first top-ten hit on the Billboard Hot 100. Despite its success, she was dissatisfied with her limited creative input, particularly regarding her work with producer Reggie Lucas, and sought greater control over her next project. By early 1984, Madonna had begun working on her second album, Like a Virgin, writing songs with longtime friend and collaborator Stephen Bray.

She requested to produce the record herself, but Warner Bros. Records rejected the proposal, instead allowing her to select a producer. Madonna subsequently chose Nile Rodgers, whose work with Chic and on David Bowie's Let's Dance (1983) she admired. During their initial meeting, Madonna played Rodgers the demos she had written with Bray, insisting that they could not work together unless he liked the songs. Rodgers recalled responding, "I don't love them now, but I will when I've finished working on them!" Recording sessions took place in mid-1984 at the Power Station studios in New York.

"Angel" was among the earliest songs developed for Like a Virgin, having been written by Madonna and Bray in late 1983. The song's religious imagery has been linked to her Catholic upbringing. Discussing her belief in angels, she once remarked, "I think it's important to call angels to you to protect you". According to Madonna's publicist, Liz Rosenberg, "Angel", along with "Rain" (1993), was intended as a tribute to singer Karen Carpenter, whom Madonna considered an influence. Personnel working on the song included Rodgers on guitars, Rob Sabino on synthesizers and synth bass, Jimmy Bralower on Linn and Simmons drum machine programming, and Curtis King on backing vocals.

== Composition and release ==
"Angel" (1985)
An excerpt of the song's refrain, featuring Madonna repeating "You're an angel" over its recurring three-chord hook.

Musically, "Angel" has been described as a dance-pop song with new wave influences, as well as technopop. In The Complete Guide to the Music of Madonna, Rikky Rooksby identified an ascending three-chord hook that underpins the verses and refrain, accompanied by a steady eighth-note rhythm. Despite its driving rhythm, drum programmer Jimmy Bralower characterized the song as more "intimate" in sound than the album's title track. The recording opens with Madonna's double-tracked laughter, which Daryl Easlea likened to Alison Moyet's vocals on Yazoo's "Situation" (1982), accompanied by ominous keyboard sounds and an echo effect panned between the left and right stereo channels. The arrangement incorporates synthesized strings, layered vocal harmonies, and a recurring pizzicato hook combining synthesizer and guitar. A synthesizer solo and refrain appear approximately two minutes into the recording. An extended dance remix incorporates audience noise to give the impression of a live performance.

Lyrically, it is a love song in which Madonna portrays her romantic interest as a heavenly being. She expresses her belief in romantic wishes coming true through the line "I believe that dreams come true", while the lyric "You must be an angel" establishes the song's central metaphor. Another line contrasts the noise of passing traffic with the pounding of her heart, reflecting her infatuation. Her vocal delivery alternates between a soft, lovestruck tone and a deeper contralto register. Stylus Magazine's Alfred Soto similarly observed Madonna's use of her lower register before a more forceful delivery of the line "I can see it in your eyes", which he compared to Public Image Ltd's "Death Disco" (1979).

"Angel" was released on April 10, 1985, as the third single from Like a Virgin. In the United States, its twelve-inch single featured "Into the Groove" as the B-side, while "Burning Up" (1983) served as the B-side in the United Kingdom and Europe. Although a music video was planned for "Angel", it was ultimately scrapped because Madonna's existing videos were already receiving heavy television airplay, according to author Mark Bego. Sire instead assembled a promotional clip using footage from her previous music videos.

== Critical reception ==
Initial reviews of "Angel" ranged from mixed to unfavorable. Cash Box described it as a mellower but upbeat pop song, highlighting Madonna's lower vocal register, less overtly sexual lyrics, and Rodgers' production. Although the review considered it less memorable than "Like a Virgin" and "Material Girl", it predicted strong commercial appeal. Terry Hazlett of the Observer–Reporter described the song as "inoffensive, danceable [but] ultimately forgettable". Susan Parker of The Macon Telegraph dismissed "Angel" as one of the album's "contrived tunes", and compared it negatively to "Holiday" and "Lucky Star". Similarly, John Leland of Spin dismissed the song as a rehash of "Lucky Star", with a "lamer" melody and less impact. Pete Bishop of The Pittsburgh Press found it "not very challenging" a song, and criticized Madonna's vocals as lacking character and sounding "nasal", "shrill", and "tinny". Matthew Jacobs of HuffPost considered "Angel" a "subpar single" compared to Madonna's preceding hits.

Retrospective assessments have been more favorable. Stephen Thomas Erlewine of AllMusic characterized "Angel" as "excellent standard-issue dance-pop", while Slant Magazine's Sal Cinquemani described it as "sugary". Matthew Rettenmund regarded it as "classic early Madonna", while Easlea considered it the best track on Like a Virgin, arguing that it had aged particularly well. He praised its upbeat energy and intimate sound, which he contrasted with the more expansive production of "Material Girl" and "Like a Virgin". Soto was similarly enthusiastic, calling "Angel" a "particular stunner" and deeming it the pinnacle of Rodgers' post-Chic production work. He also considered it more revealing of Madonna's artistic persona than "Like a Virgin" and "Material Girl". Writing for The A.V. Club, Erlewine praised "Angel" as an "unabashed, unapologetic love song", regarding it as an early indication of Madonna's artistic growth. Conversely, Rooksby dismissed "Angel" as "less than even the sum of its parts", while The Guardian's Jude Rogers felt its exploration of religious ecstasy needed "bigger wings".

Several retrospective critics have also identified "Angel" as an overlooked entry in Madonna's discography. Billboard's Joe Lynch called it an "undervalued gem" overshadowed by the more successful singles from Like a Virgin, a sentiment echoed by Adam Graham of The Detroit News. Samuel R. Murrian of Parade similarly observed that, despite being eclipsed by the album's better-known tracks, the song has remained popular among dedicated fans. Justin Myers of the Official Charts Company named "Angel" one of Madonna's "hidden gems", while Eric Henderson of Slant Magazine considered it the ultimate "this is better than I remember it" single of her career, emphasizing its appeal upon repeated rediscovery. Sarah Afshar of AXS went further, referring to "Angel" as "the best song ever by the Queen of Pop". "Angel" has been included in several retrospective rankings of Madonna's best singles. (Note: Attributed to multiple sources, including The A.V. Club, The Arizona Republic, Billboard, The Detroit News, Rolling Stone, and USA Today.)

== Chart performance ==
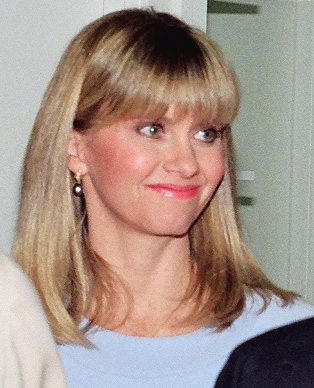
"Angel" tied Madonna with Olivia Newton-John (pictured in 1988) as the only female artists to have scored five top-five hits on the Billboard Hot 100 during the 1980s up to that point.

On the week of April 27, 1985, "Angel" received 107 new radio adds and debuted at number 48 on the Billboard Hot 100, while Madonna's previous single, "Crazy for You", held the second position. On June 15, "Angel" climbed to number nine, becoming Madonna's sixth consecutive top-ten single, one year after "Borderline" became her first. She was the first female artist to achieve this since Donna Summer, who scored eight consecutive top-ten hits between 1978 and 1980. Two weeks later, "Angel" peaked at number five on the Hot 100, becoming Madonna's fifth consecutive top-five single after "Lucky Star", "Like a Virgin", "Material Girl" and "Crazy for You". The achievement tied her with Olivia Newton-John as the only female artists to have scored five top-five hits during the 1980s up to that point. The song also reached number five on Billboard's Adult Contemporary chart and ranked at numbers 81 and 46 on the respective Hot 100 and Adult Contemporary year-end charts for 1985. In 2024, Billboard ranked "Angel" as Madonna's 18th most successful Hot 100 single.

In Canada, "Angel" debuted at number 80 on the RPM Top Singles chart dated May 4, 1985, and peaked at number five seven weeks later. It ranked at number 56 on the magazine's year-end listing. In the UK Singles Chart, the song debuted at number ten on September 9, 1985. It climbed to number five the following week and remained on the chart for 12 weeks. "Angel" has sold 205,000 copies in the country as of 2010. Elsewhere, the song reached the top 20 in Belgium, Ireland, New Zealand, Spain and Switzerland, as well as on the European Hot 100 Singles chart.

The double-sided twelve-inch single "Angel" / "Into the Groove" debuted on Billboard's Dance Club Songs chart on June 8, 1985, and reached number one three weeks later, becoming Madonna's fourth chart-topper. It ranked as the fourth most successful dance single of 1985 on the chart's year-end listing. On July 30, it was certified gold by the Recording Industry Association of America (RIAA) for shipments of one million copies in the United States. It was also the only twelve-inch single certified gold in 1985 and the first since Frankie Smith's "Double Dutch Bus" (1981). As of 2025, it had sold over one million copies in the United States. In Australia, "Angel" / "Into the Groove" topped the Kent Music Report singles chart and became the country's second-best-selling single of 1985.

== Live performance, covers and usage ==
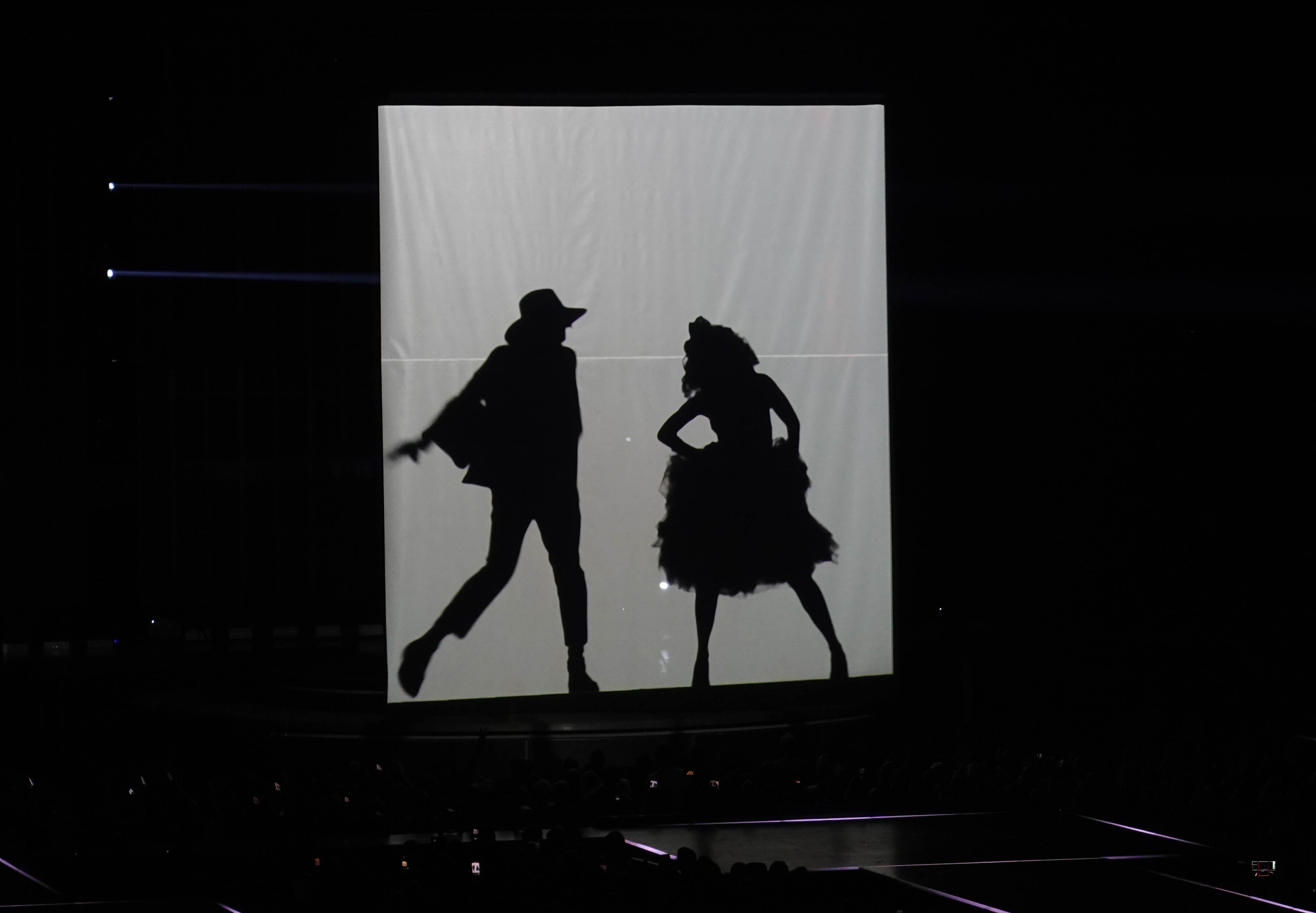
The performance of "Like a Virgin" during the Celebration Tour (2023–2024) incorporated elements of "Angel".

Madonna performed "Angel" live only during the Virgin Tour (1985). She wore purple fishnet stockings, a green miniskirt, and a black lace top adorned with crucifixes, while two male dancers accompanied her through choreographed routines. During the performance, balloons emblazoned with the words "Dreams Come True" were released from the ceiling into the audience. Reviewing the concert for USA Today, Stuart Tomlinson compared Madonna's movements to those of Prince, noting how she slithered across the speaker stands and sang while lying on her back. Elements of "Angel" were later incorporated into the Celebration Tour's (2023–2024) performance of "Like a Virgin".

In 1992, American shoegaze band Drop Nineteens covered "Angel" for their debut album Delaware. Pitchfork's Brad Shoup highlighted the cover's arpeggiated synthesizers and atmospheric shoegaze guitars, comparing its sound to a hypothetical Madonna who would "front the Deftones". Conversely, AllMusic's Ned Raggett found the rendition promising in concept but disappointing in execution, criticizing its subdued vocals and slow, plodding performance. Australian singer Darren Hayes included a cover of "Angel" as the B-side to his 2011 single "Talk Talk Talk". Hayes described his rendition as "updated but in keeping with [Madonna's] 12-inch mix". In 2019, "Angel" was featured in the third episode of the third season of the Netflix series Stranger Things.

== Track listing and formats ==
- US and Australian twelve-inch single, and 2001 European CD single
1. "Angel" (extended dance remix) – 6:15
2. "Into the Groove" – 4:40
- Seven-inch single
1. "Angel" (radio edit) – 3:40
2. "Angel" (dance mix edit) – 4:56
- British and European seven-inch single
1. "Angel" (edit) – 3:40
2. "Burning Up" (alternate version) – 4:48
- British and European twelve-inch single
1. "Angel" (extended dance remix) – 6:15
2. "Burning Up" (alternate version) – 4:48
- 2024 digital EP
1. "Angel" (radio edit) – 3:43
2. "Angel" (extended dance mix edit) - 6:12
3. "Angel" (extended dance mix) – 6:15
4. "Into the Groove" – 4:43

== Credits and personnel ==
Credits are adapted from the Like a Virgin album notes.

- Madonna – vocals, songwriter
- Stephen Bray – songwriter
- Nile Rodgers – producer, guitars
- Rob Sabino – synthesizers, synth bass
- Jimmy Bralower – Linn and Simmons drum machine programming
- Curtis King – backing vocals
- Frank Simms – backing vocals
- George Simms – backing vocals
- Herb Ritts – photography
- Jeri McManus – design

== Charts ==
=== Weekly charts ===
1985 weekly chart performance for "Angel"
Chart (1985)	Peak position
Australian (Kent Music Report) with "Into the Groove"	1
Belgium (Ultratop 50 Flanders)	20
Canada Top Singles (RPM)	5
European Hot 100 Singles (Music & Media)	14
Ireland (IRMA)	3
Netherlands (Single Top 100)	46
New Zealand (Recorded Music NZ)	2
Spain (PROMUSICAE)	2
Switzerland (Schweizer Hitparade)	17
UK Singles (Official Charts)	5
US Billboard Hot 100	5
US Adult Contemporary (Billboard)	5
US Dance Club Songs (Billboard) with "Into the Groove"	1
US Dance Singles Sales (Billboard) with "Into the Groove"	1
US Hot R&B/Hip-Hop Songs (Billboard)	71
Cash Box Top 100 Singles	7
US CHR & Pop Charts (Radio & Records)	4
West Germany (GfK)	31

2024 weekly chart performance for "Angel"
Chart (2024)	Peak position
UK Singles Downloads (Official Charts)	83

=== Year-end charts ===
1985 year-end chart performance for "Angel"
Chart (1985)	Position
Australia (Kent Music Report) with "Into the Groove"	2
Canada Top Singles (RPM)	56
New Zealand (Recorded Music NZ)	21
UK Singles (Gallup)	77
US Billboard Hot 100	81
US Adult Contemporary (Billboard )	46
US Dance Club Songs (Billboard) with "Into the Groove"	33
US Dance Singles Sales (Billboard) with "Into the Groove"	4
US Cash Box Top 100 Singles	58

=== Decade-end charts ===
Decade-end chart performance for "Angel"
Chart (1980–1989)	Position
Australia (Kent Music Report) with "Into the Groove"	31

== Certification and sales ==
Certifications and sales for "Angel"
Region	Certification	Certified units/sales
Japan (Oricon Charts)	—	20,190
United Kingdom	—	205,000
United States (RIAA) with "Into the Groove"	Gold	1,000,000^{^}
^{^} Shipments figures based on certification alone.

== Literary sources ==
- Bego, Mark (2000). Madonna: Blonde Ambition. Cooper Square Press. ISBN 978-0-8154-1051-5.
- Easlea, Daryl (2012). Madonna: Blond Ambition. Backbeat Books. ISBN 978-1-61713-034-2.
- O'Brien, Lucy (2007). Madonna: Like an Icon. Bantam Press. ISBN 978-0-06-089896-0.
- Rettenmund, Matthew (1995). Encyclopedia Madonnica. St. Martin's Press. ISBN 978-0-312-11782-5.
- Rooksby, Rikky (2004). The Complete Guide to the Music of Madonna. Omnibus Press. ISBN 978-0-7119-9883-4.
