= The Trouble with Success or How You Fit into the World =

The Trouble With Success or How You Fit Into The World

Studio album by Paula Kelley
- Released: September 2003
- Genre: Pop / Indie
- Label: Kimchee Records
- Producer: Paula Kelley

Paula Kelley chronology
| Nothing/Everything (2001) | The Trouble With Success or How You Fit Into The World (2003) | Some Sucker's Life, Part 1: Demos and Lost Recordings (2006) |

Professional ratings
Review scores
| Source | Rating |
|---|---|
| Allmusic | 3.5/5 stars |

The Trouble With Success or How You Fit Into The World is Paula Kelley's second solo album. It was released in September 2003 on Kimchee Records in the United States. The album also has been released in Japan and France under different labels. The album shows off her many talents such as playing guitar, piano and harpsichord. Her own orchestra, The Paula Kelley Orchestra, back her up on many of the songs. Los Angeles guitarist Aaron Tap played electric, 12-string and slide guitar. Fellow chamber-pop darling Eric Matthews contributes trumpet arrangements and plays on the record. The album has gained critical acclaim and plenty of fans from around the world, including Japan, France and the United States. Kelley supported the record with a full US tour and tour of France. The touring orchestra performed "A New Time" and Burt Bacharach's "Anyone Who Had a Heart" live on Radio France's Le Fou de Roi program. Kelley wrapped up promotion of The Trouble With Success or How You Fit Into The World in 2004 with a gala performance at Johnny D's in Somerville, MA, featuring with a 15-piece band/orchestra.

== Track listing ==
1. "My Finest Hour (Enter)"
2. "A New Time"
3. "Could There Be Another World"
4. "The Girlfriend"
5. "How Many Times"
6. "My Finest Hour"
7. "The Rest of You"
8. "I'd Fall In Love With Anyone"
9. "Night Racer"
10. "September Eyes"
11. "Friday Came"
12. "Where Do You Go"
13. "My Finest Hour (Exit)"
14. "Why Won't People Change?"
15. "Earth Oddity"
- (Tracks 14 and 15 were only released in Japan.)
- French album released on Polaris/Sony Music
- Japanese album released on Caraway Records/ Hayabusa Landings
