= Total Contrast =

Music duo from England

- Origin: London, England
- Genres: Funk, electro, soul
- Instruments: Vocals (Delroy Murray); Keyboards, bass, drums (Robin Achampong)
- Years active: 1983–1989
- Labels: London Records, Virgin Records, Criminal Records
- Past members: Robin Achampong; Delroy Murray

Total Contrast were a male musical duo from England, specialising in soul and electro music. They are known for their 1985 hit "Takes a Little Time", which made No. 1 on the US dance chart and No. 17 in the UK. The group formed in 1983 consisting of members Robin Achampong and Delroy Murray.

== Biography ==
In the mid-1980s, they scored several hits on the US Hot Dance Music/Club Play chart, including "Takes a Little Time", which hit No. 1 in 1985. In their homeland, the same song reached No. 17 on the UK Singles Chart. Further releases in the UK included "Hit and Run", a minor hit which reached No. 41 in 1985, "The River" which peaked at No. 44 in early 1986, and "What You Gonna Do About It" peaking at No. 63 in the summer of 1986. The latter track was also featured on the band's self-titled album.

They appeared on the Dance Aid single, released in April 1987. Another album, Beat to Beat, was released in 1987. Two singles, "Kiss" and "Jody", despite being popular on the dance floors, were only minor chart hits. The same happened to their 1988 cover version of Bob Marley's "Waiting in Vain".

Achampong and Murray formed the group Tongue 'n' Cheek in 1987.

Total Contrast found popularity with 1980s revivalists, in particular the Canadian duo Chromeo, who included "Takes a Little Time" on their 2005 album, Chromeo Presents Un Joli Mix Pour Toi.

== Discography ==
=== Albums ===
Year	Album	Label	UK
1985	Total Contrast	London Records	67
1987	Beat to Beat	London Records	—

=== Singles ===
Year	Single	Peak chart positions		
Year	Single	US Dance	US R&B	UK
1983	"Be with You Tonight"	—	—	―
1984	"Next Time I'll Know Better" / "Sunshine"	—	—	—
1984	"The Apple of My Eye" (with Carroll Thompson)	—	―	—
1985	"Hit and Run"	—	—	41
1985	"Takes a Little Time"	1	80	17
1985	"The River"	7	88	44
1986	"What You Gonna Do About It"	42	64	63
1987	"Jody"	—	—	90
1987	"Kiss"	26	55	80
1988	"Waiting in Vain"	—	—	90
1989	"Love Fever" (with Tongue 'n' Cheek)	—	—	—
"—" denotes releases that did not chart or were not released in that territory.

== See also ==
- List of number-one dance hits (United States)
- List of artists who reached number one on the US Dance chart
