= Delaware (album) =

Studio album by Drop Nineteens
- Released: June 19, 1992
- Studio: Downtown (Boston, Massachusetts)
- Genre: Shoegaze
- Length: 43:15
- Label: Caroline; Hut
- Producer: Drop Nineteens; Paul Degooyer

Drop Nineteens chronology
Mayfields (1991)	Delaware (1992)	Your Aquarium (1992)

Singles from Delaware
- 1. "Winona" Released: 1992

Delaware is the debut studio album by American indie rock band Drop Nineteens. It was released on June 19, 1992, by Caroline Records. Hut Records issued the album, along with the single "Winona", in the United Kingdom the same year.

On April 20, 2009, Delaware was reissued by Cherry Red Records with four bonus tracks from the band's 1992 EP Your Aquarium.

== Artwork ==
The artwork for Delaware features a young girl holding a revolver in front of a barber shop. When the album was reissued in 2024, the band chose to replace the revolver in the image with a flower because of the prevalence of gun violence in the United States, donating a portion of its sales to the Artist for Action charity. Additionally, the band's friend Phil, who was mentioned in the song "Kick the Tragedy", died from a gun-related incident.

== Critical reception ==
Professional ratings
Review scores
Source	Rating
AllMusic	3.5/5 stars
NME	8/10
Pitchfork	7.5/10
Record Collector	3/5 stars
Vox	8/10

The New York Times noted that the band's "use of atonal chords, excessive distortion and mumbled non sequiturs can be traced back to Sonic Youth's 1988 album Daydream Nation."

In 2016, Pitchfork ranked Delaware at number 45 on its list of the 50 best shoegaze albums of all time.

== Track listing ==
All lyrics are written by Greg Ackell, except where noted; all music is composed by Ackell, Paula Kelley, Chris Roof, Motohiro Yasue and Steve Zimmerman, except where noted.

No.	Title	Length
1.	"Delaware"	4:59
2.	"Ease It Halen"	3:54
3.	"Winona"	3:27
4.	"Kick the Tragedy"	8:53
5.	"Baby Wonder's Gone"	3:06
6.	"Happen"	3:39
7.	"Reberrymemberer"	4:36
8.	"Angel" (lyrics and music by Madonna and Stephen Bray)	5:19
9.	"My Aquarium"	3:00
10.	"(Plus Fish Dream)"	2:22
Total length:		43:15

2009 reissue bonus tracks
No.	Title	Length
11.	"Nausea"	2:50
12.	"Movie"	4:32
13.	"Mandy" (lyrics and music by Scott English and Richard Kerr)	5:08
14.	"My Aquarium (2nd Time Around)"	3:09
Total length:		58:54

== Personnel ==
Credits are adapted from the album's liner notes.

Drop Nineteens

- Greg Ackell – guitar, vocals
- Paula Kelley – vocals, guitar
- Chris Roof – drums
- Motohiro Yasue – guitar
- Steve Zimmerman – bass

Production

- Vincent Buckholtz II – mixing, recording (assistant)
- Paul Degooyer – production, mixing, recording
- Drop Nineteens – production
- Dave Snider – recording
- Jennifer Spaziani – mixing (assistant)
- Jeff Way – mixing (assistant)

Design

- Petrisse Brièl – photography
- Ellie Hughes – design
- Tom Hughes – design
- Turlach MacDonagh – photography

== Charts ==
Chart (1992)	Peak position
UK Independent Albums (OCC)	5
