= Call Me Mr. Telephone (Answering Service) =

Single by Cheyne
- Released: 1985
- Recorded: 1985
- Genre: R&B; Synthpop; Italo disco; Freestyle
- Length: 6:25
- Label: MCA Records (U.S.); WEA (Co-distributor, Worldwide)
- Songwriter(s): Anthony Carrasco; Giuseppe Nicolosi
- Producer(s): Mark Kamins; Stephane Gerbier

Call Me Mr. Telephone (Answering Service) is a 1985 single by American teenage singer, Cheyne, which was produced by Mark Kamins and Stephane Gerbier, and written by Nicolosi Giuseppe and Tony Carrasco (credited as Answering Service).

== Background ==
The single is a cover version of a 1984 single recorded by the Italian group Answering Service (first name of the band Novecento), whose name was included in the bracket as an acknowledgement to the group and to avoid confusion due to the single being released internationally. At the time of the recording, there were rumors that Madonna did the vocals in 1983, but like with another song, “Baby Love,” the rumors proved false. This was Cheyne's only charted single, which topped the Dance chart for 1 week on June 8, 1985, and remained on the chart for eleven weeks. On the soul chart "Call Me Mr. Telephone" peaked at number sixty-two.

== Reception ==
John Leland of Spin wrote, "Urban tribalism spins a polyrhythmic groove around the most prominent artifact of our times. Cheyne brings the beat of hip hop and a chukka-chukka rhythm guitar into a mix made in club heaven."

== Charts ==
Chart (1985)	Peak position
U.S. Billboard Hot Dance Club Play	1
U.S. Billboard Hot Dance Music/Maxi-Singles Sales	1
U.S. Billboard Hot R&B/Hip-Hop Songs	62
