= Skipworth & Turner =

American male duo

- Origin: United States
- Genres: Dance-pop, post-disco, soul
- Years active: 1985–1991
- Labels: 4th & Broadway, Warner Bros.
- Past members: Phil Turner; Rodney Skipworth

Skipworth & Turner were a United States male musical duo, consisting of Rodney Skipworth (from Syracuse, New York) and Phil Turner (from Memphis, Tennessee). Their biggest hit came in 1985, when they went to No. 1 on the US Billboard Hot Dance Club Play chart with "Thinking About Your Love". The track reached No. 24 in the UK Singles Chart, and a further release, "Make It Last" peaked at No. 60 in the same chart in January 1989.

The duo disbanded in 1991. A greatest hits compilation was issued the following year by Unidisc Music.

== Discography ==
=== Studio albums ===
- Skipworth & Turner (1985) (4th & Broadway)
- Harlem Nights (1989) (4th & Broadway)

=== Compilation albums ===
- The Greatest Hits (1992)

=== Singles ===
| Year | Single | Peak chart positions | | | |
| Year | Single | US Dance | US R&B | US Pop | UK |
|---|---|---|---|---|---|
| 1985 | "Thinking About Your Love" | 1 | 10 | 104 | 24 |
| 1985 | "Hot Pursuit!" | ― | ― | ― | 81 |
| 1986 | "Won't Get No Better" | ― | ― | ― | ― |
| 1986 | "Can't Give Her Up" | 7 | 63 | ― | ― |
| 1988 | "Make It Last" | ― | ― | ― | 60 |
| 1989 | "Cash" | ― | ― | ― | ― |
| 1989 | "I Miss It" | ― | ― | ― | ― |
| 1990 | "Some Day You'll Come Back to Me" | ― | ― | ― | ― |
| 1991 | "I Shoulda Been Good" | ― | ― | ― | ― |
"—" denotes releases that did not chart or were not released in that territory.

== See also ==
- List of Billboard number-one dance club songs
- List of artists who reached number one on the U.S. Dance Club Songs chart
