= Speaker stands =

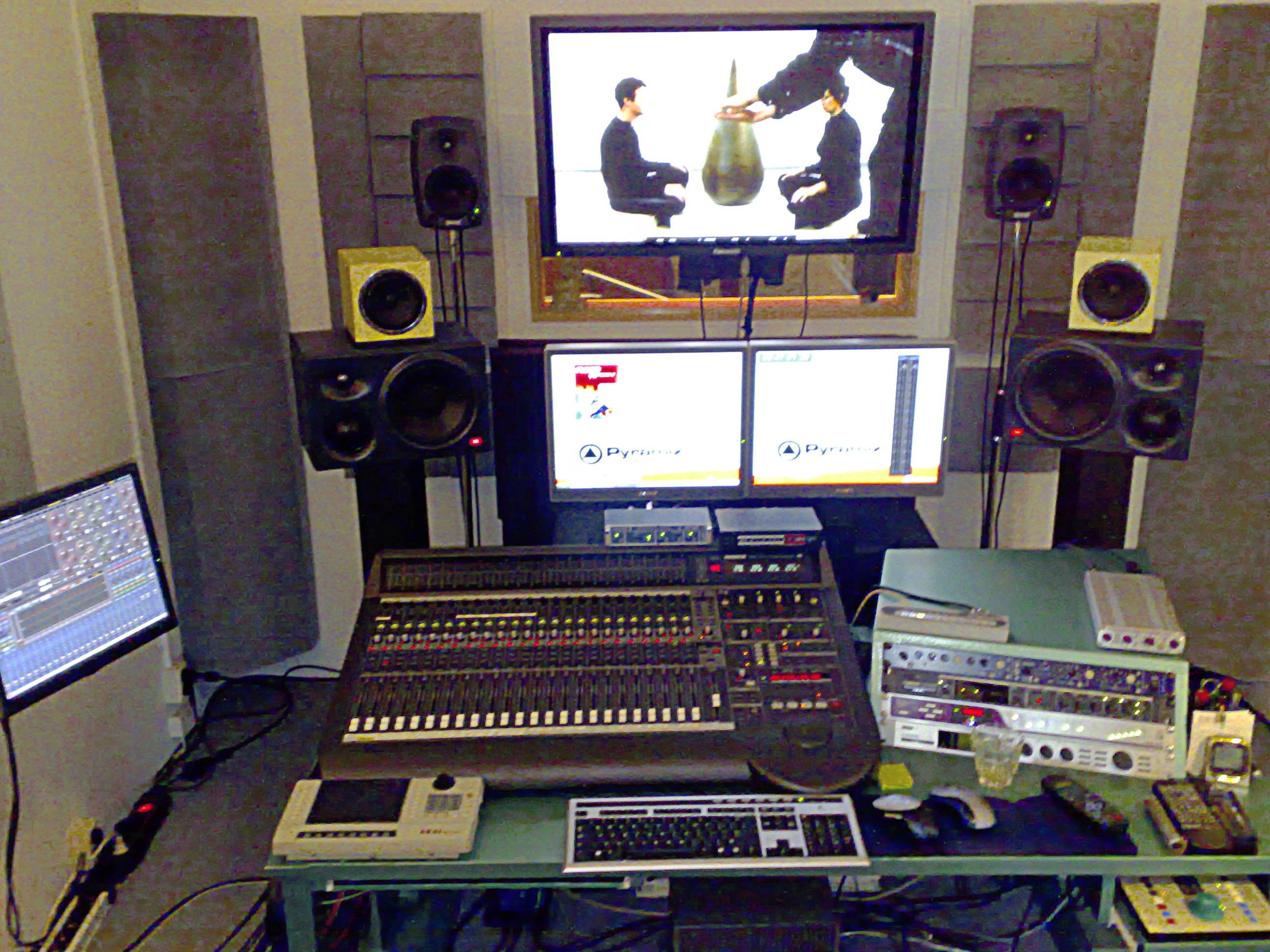
Audio-visual studio with three separate pairs of studio monitors on speaker stands

Speaker stands are stands on which loudspeakers are placed with the aim of improving the quality of sound from the speaker.

In the 1970s musicians and high fidelity enthusiasts found that lifting speakers off the ground and mounting them on something with no vibration increased sound quality. Ordinary domestic furniture was not built with the properties that would deaden vibrations and so enhance the speaker's sound. Speaker stands, therefore, were purpose-built to remove any deleterious colourations that came about through unwanted vibration.

Further research has shown that speakers are best positioned so that the tweeter is level with the ear of the listener, and so speaker stands are often built so that they line up the speakers with the ear of a person when sitting down.

== See also ==
- Loudspeaker
- Loudspeaker enclosure
