= Superbus (band) =

French pop/rock band

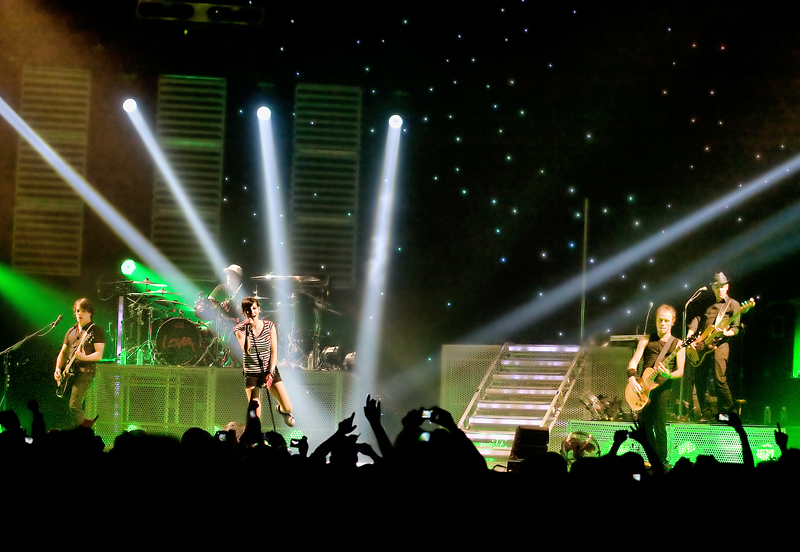
- Superbus in Marseille (2009)

Background information
- Origin: France
- Genres: Rock, pop rock, power pop, synthpop
- Years active: 1999–present
- Members: Jennifer Ayache, a.k.a. Jenn; Patrice Focone, a.k.a. Pat; Michel Giovannetti, a.k.a. Mitch; François Even, a.k.a. Küntz; Greg Jacks
- Past members: Guillaume Rousé, a.k.a. Rouséman; Jocelyn Moze
- Website: http://www.superbus.fr

Superbus is a five-piece French pop rock band formed in 1999 with Jenn Ayache on lead vocals. The band's name is from the Latin word superbus, meaning proud, which Ayache stumbled upon while browsing through a Latin dictionary. The band has released five studio albums to date and a compilation album.

== Beginnings ==
After a trip to the United States to perfect her English in 1999, Jennifer Ayache looked for musicians to form a group. She met Michel Giovannetti, a guitarist, and François Even, a bass guitarist, who already knew each other from another group, and formed a new band, initially as a three-piece before two other members joined.

Those two were later replaced by Guillaume Rousé on drums and Patrice Focone on guitar. Rousé left the band in 2005 and was replaced by Greg Jacks.

== History ==
In 2002, Superbus released its first album, Aéromusical. The band's second album, Pop'n'gum, released in 2004, was produced by David Salsedo from Silmarils. In 2006, Superbus won the Best French Act award at the MTV Europe Music Awards and, in 2008, the NRJ Music Award of the Best French Music Band.

After three months of touring during summer 2010, the band announced a short break, during which each member would work on solo projects. In August 2011, the band's lead guitarist, Patrice Focone, announced they would begin work on new material together in early September. In April 2012, Jenn announced the band is finalizing the mixing of their new album and will go on tour later in 2012. They premiered a new single in June entitled "All Alone" and released a music video for it shortly after with a follow-up single entitled "A la chaine". Yet a third single "Whisper" featured Richie Sambora of Bon Jovi. A music video for the single was released on Halloween 2012. In early November 2012 the band began to embark on their Sunset Tour from late 2012 to summer 2013 to promote their album Sunset.

In October 2015, Superbus released a non-single song called "Un Autre Monde" for an album featuring various artists called the Téléphone Tribute.

In 2016, Superbus started teasing for a new album on their Facebook page. This album was that revealed to be Sixtape, the band's 6th album, and it was released on 3 June 2016.

The first single from the album is called "Strong and Beautiful," which Superbus released a lyrics video for on 4 March 2016.

The second single from the album is called "On the river", and Superbus released a lyrics video for it on 12 September 2016.

The singles also have an acoustic, piano-driven version included on the Limited edition CDs, these also have shorter lyrics than the original versions.

On 15 June 2019 the band revealed the poster for a new tour that signifies the band's 20th anniversary celebration. Later on, it was also revealed that the band will likely have a new album coming in early 2020.

The EP named XX was released on 13 March 2020.

After years of hiatus, the band returned in 2025 with a new album named OK KO. It was launched in July 2025.

== Members ==
- Jennifer Ayache, a.k.a. Jenn – lead and backing vocals, guitars, ukulele, keyboards, organ, piano, drums, percussion (1999–present)
- Patrice Focone, a.k.a. Pat – electric and slide guitar, keyboards, programming, backing and lead vocals (2000–present)
- Michel Giovannetti, a.k.a. Mitch – guitar, keyboards (1999–present)
- François Even, a.k.a. Küntz – bass, keyboards, backing vocals (2000–present)
- Greg Jacks – drums, percussion (2006–2015, 2019–present)

Former members

- Nicolas Jean – drums (2000)
- Guillaume Rousé, a.k.a. Rouséman – drums (2000–2006)

Session/Touring members

- Jocelyn Moze – drums, percussion (only on the Sixtape album) (2015)
- Tom Daveau – drums (only on the sixtape album) (2015)
- Romain Bachelard – drums, percussion (only for the Sixtape tour) (2016–2017)

== Solo projects ==
Band members have been known to have their side solo projects.

=== Jenn Ayache ===
The lead vocalist Jennifer Ayache, also known as Jenn Ayache, was born in Cannes on 9 November 1983. She is the daughter of Jean-Pierre Ayache and Chantal Lauby, the latter a member of the comedy group Les Nuls. Vocalist Jenn Ayache is also a multi-instrumentalist playing the drums, guitar and piano.

She met guitarist Michel Giovannetti co-founding the band in October 1999. A successful songwriter, she has written songs for a number of artists including "Comment faire" for David Hallyday and for musical comedies Scooby-Doo et les Pirates Fantômes (2009) in the song "Aero Toto" and for Kamel Ouali's musical Dracula – L'amour plus fort que la mort (2010) in the song "1, 2, 3" performed by Anaïs Delva, and the debut single from the play, plus "Encore" and "Appelle le docteur". She also wrote the play's She was in album Satellite in 2004 under the pseudonyme Marie Janin and sang with Marc Lavoine the song "Désolé". She offered the song "Tu te fous de nous" originally titled "Dansez" to Christophe Willem for the album Caféine in 2009. In January 2010, she was part of the charity song "Un Geste pour Haïti chérie". She has been in the audiovisual production La cité de la peur (1994), and in a TV film Telle mère telle fille (1998) playing the role of Rebecca.

In October 2014, she released her solo album +001 that charted in France and Belgium.

== In popular culture ==
Their song "Lola" is the main theme song of the Greek TV series that has the same name (Λολα), inspired by the original Argentine series Lalola.

"Radio Song" off of their second album Pop'n'gum was featured in the video game Guitar Hero III: Legends of Rock as an unlockable bonus song.

"Butterfly" is featured in the soundtrack of the video game FIFA 08.

== Discography ==
=== Studio albums ===
Year	Title	Peak positions			Certification
Year	Title	FRA	BEL (Wa)	SWI	Certification
2002	Aéromusical	85	–	–	
2004	Pop'n'gum	26	–	–	
2006	Wow	6	38	–	
2009	Lova Lova	2	13	45	
2012	Sunset	5	14	55	
2016	Sixtape	14	44	82	

=== Compilation albums ===
Year	Title	Peak positions	
Year	Title	FRA	BEL (Wa)
2010	Happy BusDay: The Best of Superbus	182	44

=== Extended plays ===
Year	Title	Peak positions
Year	Title	FRA
2020	XX	65

=== Singles ===
Year	Title	Peak positions			Album
Year	Title	FRA	BEL (Wa)	SWI	Album
2002	"Tchi-Cum-Bah"	59	–	–	Aéromusical
2005	"Pop'n'Gum"	39	–	–	Pop'n'Gum
2007	"Butterfly"	11	40	80	Wow
2007	"Lola"	7	13	72	Wow
2007	"Travel the World"	30	48	–	Wow
2009	"Addictions"	7	42	–	Lova Lova
2009	"Apprends-moi"	19	62	–	Lova Lova
2010	"Mes défauts"	–	77	–	Happy BusDay - The Best Of Superbus
2012	"All Alone"	93	81	–	Sunset
2016	"Strong and Beautiful"	117	–	–	Sixtape
2020	"Silencio"	–	–	–	XX
2025	"Lola" (with Hoshi featuring Nicola Sirkis)	70	–	–	Sixtape
2025	"Butterfly" (Remix) (featuring Rori)	–	34	–	Non-album single

=== Other songs ===
- 2003: "Superstar"
- 2003: "Into the Groove"
- 2003: "Monday to Sunday"
- 2004: "Sunshine"
- 2004: "Radio Song"
- 2005: "Little Hily"
- 2006: "Le rock à Billy"
- 2008: "Ça mousse"
- 2009: "Lova Lova"
- 2009: "Nelly"
- 2012: "À la chaîne"
- 2012: "Whisper"

=== Studio albums ===
Year	Album	Peak positions	
Year	Album	FRA	BEL (Wa)
2014	+001	46	75
