= Cheyne (singer) =

American singer and songwriter

- Born: Cheyne Anderson
- Origin: Los Angeles, California, U.S.
- Genres: R&B; dance
- Occupations: Singer; songwriter
- Years active: 1984–present
- Labels: MCA

Cheyne Anderson, better known mononymously as Cheyne, is an American R&B singer who was still a teenager when her song "Call Me Mr. Telephone (Answering Service)" hit number one on the U.S. Hot Dance Club Play chart in 1985. She also contributed to the Weird Science soundtrack with the song "Private Joy".

The Madonna single "Into the Groove" was originally written by Madonna as a song to be performed by Cheyne.

== See also ==
- List of number-one dance hits (United States)
- List of artists who reached number one on the US Dance chart
