= Takes a Little Time (Total Contrast song) =

Song by Total Contrast

from the album Total Contrast
- Released: 1985
- Length: 3m 40s (7" single); 5m 30s (The Bandito Mix)

"Takes a Little Time" is a 1985 dance hit by British, techno-soul, duo, Total Contrast. Their debut American release went to number one on the U.S. dance chart for one week. "Takes a Little Time" did not make the Hot 100 but, peaked at number eighty on the R&B singles chart. The song also reached number 17 in the UK Charts.
