= Thinking About Your Love (Skipworth & Turner song) =

Single released by Skipworth & Turner

"Thinking About Your Love" is a 1985 song by Skipworth & Turner. In the US, it reached number one on the dance chart and number ten on the R&B chart. In the UK, the song reached No. 24 on the singles chart.

Chart (1985)	Peak position
New Zealand (Recorded Music NZ)	47
UK Singles (OCC)	24
US Hot Dance Music Play	1
US Hot R&B Singles	10
