= Paula Kelley =

American singer-songwriter

- Also known as: The Divine PK
- Born: Paula Anne Kelley; September 10, 1971 (age 54); Boston, Massachusetts, U.S.
- Genres: Indie pop, indie rock
- Occupations: Composer, arranger, singer-songwriter, multi-instrumentalist
- Instruments: Guitar, piano, bass, harpsichord, harp
- Years active: 1990–present
- Labels: Stop, Pop, and Roll
- Website: thedivinepk.com

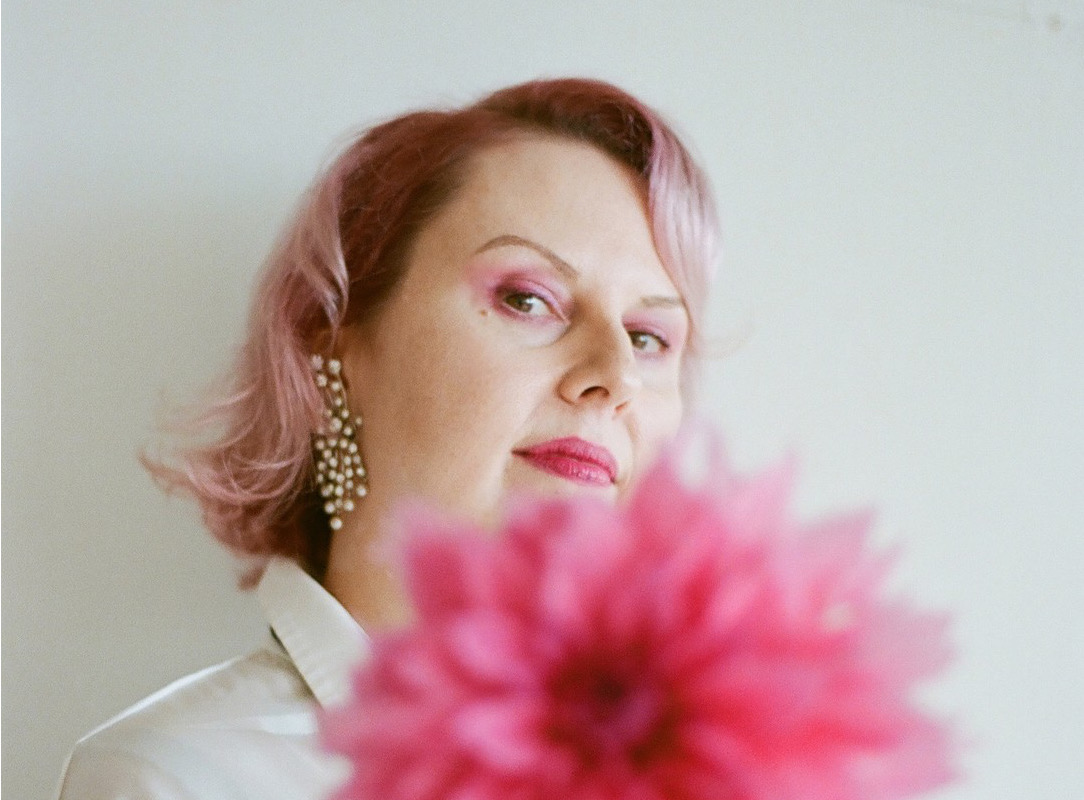
Paula Kelley photo by Annabell K Lee

Paula Anne Kelley (born September 10, 1971) is an American indie pop singer-songwriter and orchestral arranger/composer from Boston, Massachusetts.

== Career ==
She began her musical career in the 1990s with the band Drop Nineteens before leaving them in 1994 to start her own career in songwriting. She worked with several other bands before going solo with her first album, Nothing/Everything, which was released in 2001 on Stop, Pop, and Roll Records in the US and then later on Caraway in Japan. The Trouble with Success or How You Fit into the World was released in 2003 on the independent Kimchee Records label in the US and again on Caraway in Japan. She followed this up with a US tour and a tour of France after the album's European release through Polaris Musique/Sony. Her latest release is the "Airports EP (2008)," a collection of four orchestrated tracks.

In 2005, Kelley relocated to Los Angeles to pursue a career scoring films and doing orchestral arrangements, in addition to recording and performing her own music.

In 2022, Kelley reunited with Drop Nineteens. The band released a new album, Hard Light, in 2023.

Kelley released her third solo LP, the baroque pop Blinking As The Starlight Burns Out, in 2026.

== Discography ==
- Blinking As The Starlight Burns Out (2026 Wharf Cat Records)
- The Airports EP (2008 Worm Kid Music)
- Some Sucker's Life, Part 1: Demos and Lost Recordings (2006 Stop, Pop, and Roll Records)
- The Trouble with Success or How You Fit into the World (2003 Kimchee Records)
- Nothing/Everything (2001 Stop, Pop, and Roll Records)
- A Bit of Everything EP (2000 JacquesAss Records)
- Why Christmas? with The Misfit Toys (1999 Rhubarb Records)
- Break the Spell, Etc. EP with Boy Wonder (1999 Jackass Records)
- 5:01 with Paula Kelley Rock Band(1997 Rhubarb Records)
- Wonder-Wear with Boy Wonder (1997 Cherrydisc/Roadrunner Records)
- Mission to Destroy b/w Backyard 7-inch with Boy Wonder (self-released)
- Speed – Danger – Death with Hot Rod (1993 Caroline/Hut Records)
