= So Get Up =

Spoken-word poem by Ithaka Darin Pappas

- So Get Up (original demo version cover) 1993

Single by Ithaka with mixes by USL, Lexicon Avenue, Cosmic Gate etc.
- Released: 1992–present
- Recorded: Ithaka's acapella recorded 13 December 1992, Estúdios 1 Só Céu – Cascais, Portugal. Music made globally by individual producers (1993–present)
- Length: Varying lengths
- Label: Sweatlodge Records [US], Nervous Records (US), Kaos Records [Portugal], Tribal Records [US/UK], Armada Music; London Recordings; Twisted Records [USA/UK], **Publishing administered by North Music Group [US]
- Songwriter: Ithaka Darin Pappas
- Producer: various

"So Get Up" is a 1992 rhyming, spoken-word poem by Ithaka Darin Pappas (professionally known by his mononym Ithaka) that has been utilized in songs of various genres of music, most frequently electronic music, with differing degrees of success.

In 2025, Expresso journalist Paulo André Cecílio stated that Ithaka's lyrics Forget the past, go outside, have a blast are words that, at one point in the 90s, had as much impact around the world as Timothy Leary's famous expression: Turn on, tune in, drop out.

Because of multiple remixes and recreations using Ithaka's a capella as the lyrical and vocal component, the "So Get Up" is frequently associated with other artists, including; Portuguese house music production duo Underground Sound of Lisbon, German trance music duo Cosmic Gate, the Spanish group Committe, and British producers such as Stretch & Vern, Meat Katie and Fatboy Slim.

== Song Origins and Meaning ==
Ithaka Darin Pappas lived and recorded in Lisbon, Portugal, from 1992 to 1998 (now considered the artist's Portuguese Years). His poem "So Get Up" (then titled "So Get Up, the End of the Earth Is Upon Us") was written and first vocalized on December 13, 1992, for a program called Quarto Bairro on Rádio Comercial in Lisbon. He had written the poem on a coffeeshop napkin, just minutes before going into the station. The station's sound engineer, Pedro Costa, recorded Ithaka's voice while he was live on-air.

When asked about the meaning of the poem in a 2020 interview by Maria Ana Ventura for UP Magazine, Ithaka stated that his father had recently passed away when he had written it and that it was that affirmation of the impermanence of our individual lives, and perhaps existence itself, that had affected him, "Life is short, so let's live it", he said.

In March 1993, he recorded a Kraftwerk-inspired techno-pop version in Manchester, England (with a student engineer-producer), released with little attention on Embryo Recordings. On this version, however, Ithaka added the final lines, Goodbye my friends, Goodbye world, I'll see you in the next life. This addition has remained on all subsequent rerecording of the vocal, and on all printed forms of the poem for the last thirty-five years.

In 1994, Underground Sound of Lisbon (or USL) invited Ithaka to re-record his poem on their instrumental entitled "303" for their B-Side of their first release 12" demo vinyl. The song became popular within Portugal and was later licensed internationally.

== Acapella Usage ==
Because two a capellas were unauthorizedly included on the first U.S. and U.K. releases of USL's "So Get Up" on Tribal America Records, rogue musical versions using the vocal snowballed out of control. Hundreds of House, Hardstyle, Progressive House, Speedcore, Trance, Techno, Tech House, Industrial, Rock, Dubstep and Gabber producers have simply placed the So Get Up vocal on their own instrumentals and called them their own (sometimes with subtle title changes, but often just as "So Get Up"). To date, there are now several hundred released remixes using Ithaka Darin Pappas' original vocal recording. As of late 2016, So Get Up now holds the distinction of being the most remixed vocal a cappella in musical history (Guinness World Record Holder 2016).

Thru the last three and a half decades, the poem So Get Up has served as the base of songs of varying titles such as; "Get Up", "Insane", "Go Insane", "Get Up! Go Insane!", "Forget the Past", "Next Life", "See You in the Next Life" "The End of the Earth", "The End of the Earth Is Upon Us", "Hardventure", "Headcharge", "Hurt", "Belther", "Last Resurrection", "Earthquake", "PPF (Past Present Future)", "Intensity", "My Tripcreator", "Viginti Etduo", "Trance Line", "Zombie", "All Points North", "Speed O.J.", "1000 Miles" etc. has been remixed, sampled and released in a multitude of EDM styles on the records of; Fatboy Slim, Stretch & Vern, Oxia, Peter Bailey, Orion's Voice, JJ Mullor, Dani Sbert, Lexington Avenue, Dylan, Derek Marin, Public Domain, K-Traxx, Technoboy, Bob Ray & Van Dyuk, Ben Gold, Pelari, Meat Katie and many others.

== Most Visible Versions ==
Several of the songs utilizing the So Get Up poem as their lyrical and vocal base have had an element of charting success in countries around the world including, the USA, UK, Spain, Denmark and France.

=== USL featuring So Get Up (1994) ===
USL's "So Get Up" featuring Ithaka became popular within Portugal and with the aid of Junior Vasquez was eventually licensed internationally selling approximately 80,000 copies, with over a million copies of the song sold between 1994 and 1995 via international compilations, reaching the #1 ranking on specialized dance music charts around the world.

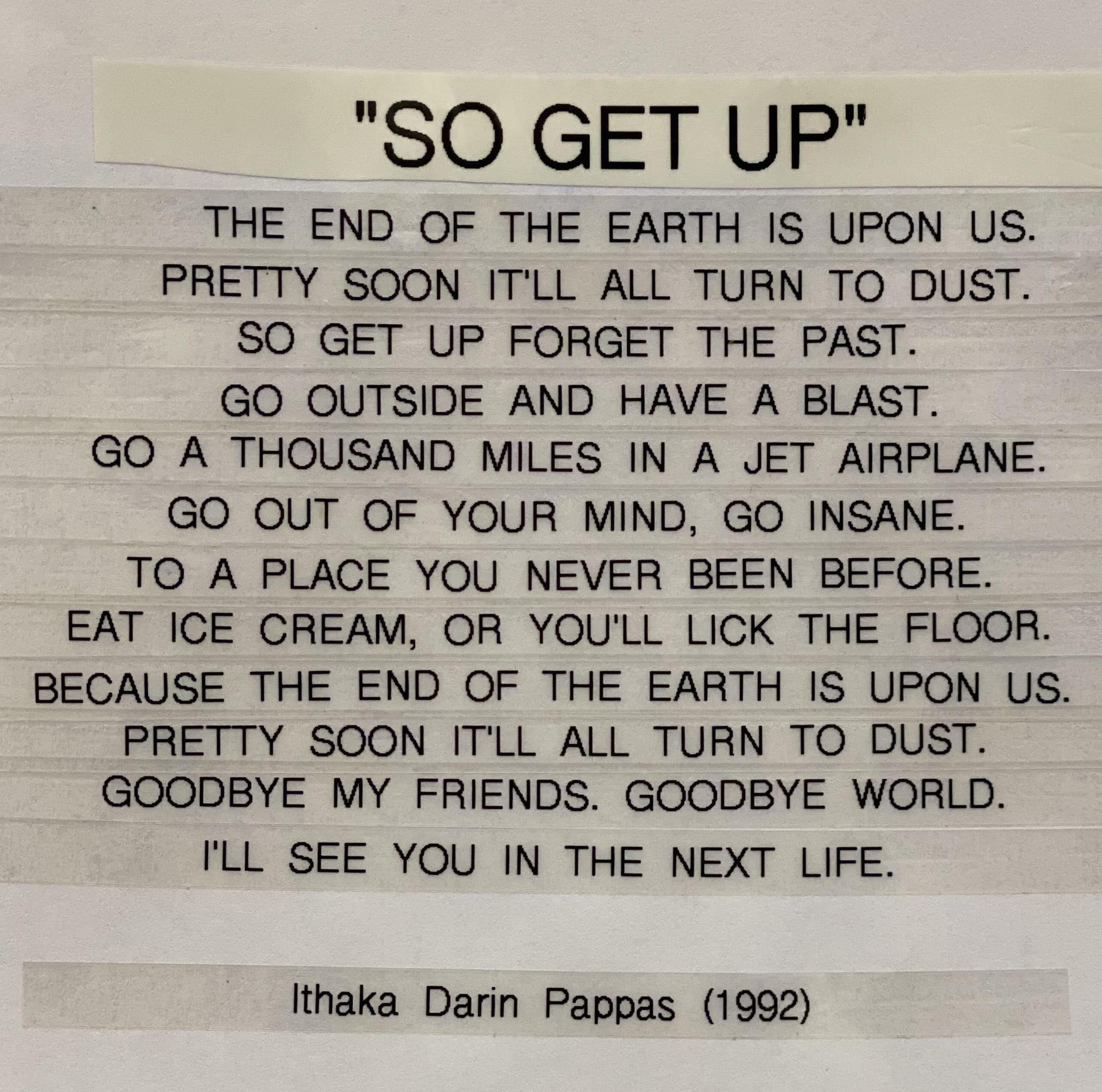
"So Get Up" lyric collage.

In 2025, "So Get Up"(one by U.S.L. was featured in the award-winning documentary, Paraíso directed by Daniel Mota about rave culture and the history of electronic music in Portugal. Among other topics, the film discusses So Get Up's influence in bringing Portuguese dance music to a more international presence in the music world. Paraíso, which also features top Djs such as Yen Sung and Carlos Fauvrelle, won both the Best Documentary Award and the FILMin Audience Choice Award at the 2025 Caminhos do Cinema Português festival in Coimbra. The film was also in included in the Official Selection of the 2025 Melkweg festival in Amsterdam.

=== Committe "Trance Line" (1995) ===
In 1995, Madrid-based production team Committee (Dimas Carbajo and J.J. De La Fuente) released the Hard trance song entitled "Trance Line" (distributed by MD Records). which utilized the entirety of Ithaka's So Get Up spoken-word poem. The track rose to No. 3 in January 1995 on the Billboard Singles Chart for Spain, remaining in the Top Ten for more than a month. Committee's Trance Line versions, which also had several mixes of their own utilized all of Ithaka's original vocal.

=== Stretch & Vern "Get Up! Go Insane!" (1997) ===
Get Up! Go Insane! is a Breakbeatsong by London-based DJ/producers Stretch Silvester (Stuart Silvester) and Jules Vern (Julian Peake) under the name Stretch & Vern featuring elements of Ithaka's poem, So Get Up as the hook. The song peak at #1 of the UK Dance Single Charts and #17 on the UK Singles Charts. Larry Flick from Billboard magazine said of the song, "sparkles with cross-over appeal, thanks to a credible beat, a glossy hook and smooth synths". The Brixton Buzz called it, a worldwide hit.

In 1999, Samsung in Korea featured Get Up! Go Insane! in a national My Jet printer television commercial featuring actress Jun Ji-Hyun. According to almost all online biographical sources, the commercial transformed Ji-Hyun into a teen idol in Korea, and today Jun Ji-Hyun is one of the most prominent celebrities in the entire country.

=== Atlantis Ita "See You In The Next Life" (2000) ===
In 2000, the Italian project Atlantis Ita (formed by members Alessandro Foietta, Dino Lenny, Marco Capelli) created the Acid trance song, See You In The Next Life, featuring memorable lines from "So Get Up". The instrumental itself was largely borrowed from "Freedom" by Chris Huelsbeck (featured in the soundtrack of the video game Turrican II: The Final Fight), while the vocal element was an unauthorized use of Ithaka's vocals and lyrics. The song was released by Overdose Records in Germany and Infusion Records in the UK, where is peaked in the #91 position on the UK Singles Charts in August of 2000. Several remixes have since been recorded.

The same year Atlantis Ita "See You In The Next Life" appeared during the closing titles sequence of the British feature film Sorted, directed by Alexander Jovy and starring Matthew Rhys, Sienna Guillory, Ben Moor and Tim Curry.

The Sorted soundtrack also includes songs by; Leftfield, Morcheeba, Public Enemy, Elvis Presley, Matt Darey, Southsugar, The Turtles, Mauro Picotto, Paul Johnson, Aphrodite, Agnelli & Nelson, Funky G, Gibson Brothers, St. Etienne, Kadda Cherif Hadria, Disposable Disco Dubs, Six Degrees, Da Hool, Highgate, Art of Trance, Scott 4, Depeche Mode, Twisted Pair, Lost Tribe, and CRW.

=== Meat Katie "Next Life" (2002) ===
In March of 2002, Breakspoll Award winning electronic music producer Meat Katie (aka Mark Pember) released the Breakbeat, Tech House track entitled "Next Life" (released by Kingsize Records, UK) which featured a significant part of Ithaka's "So Get Up" spoken-word poem, with several reoccurrences used as the hook. In April of 2002, the song peaked at #28 on the UK Dance Singles charts.

In May of 2002, Meat Katie released an additional 12" vinyl, also on Kingsize Records, featuring two remixes of "Next Life", one by Elite Force (Simon Shackleton), another by Phil Kieran from Northern Ireland.

Note: In 2005, Meat Katie, used Ithaka's "So Get Up" poem again for a live Mashup with the track "Phat Prick" by Figures. This new creation appeared that appeared Meat Katie's album FabricLive.21 recorded during a set at Fabric Nightclub in Farringdon, London.

=== Miss Kittin "Radio Caroline Intro" (2002) ===
In 2003, world-renowned French DJ, songwriter and performer Miss Kittin used Ithaka's entire "So Get Up" poem as part of the intro on her album Radio Caroline Vol.1 intertwined with her own spoken-word autobiographical story. The album, released by Mental Groove Records peaked at #134 of France's Top Album charts and sold approximately 50,000 globally.

=== Cosmic Gate "So Get Up" (2013) ===
In 2013, German Trance superstars Cosmic Gate (Claus Terhoeven and Stefan Bossems), released Progressive Trance, Main-Floor EDM song called So Get Up. Without a doubt, Cosmic Gate's version of has become the biggest commercially successful song incorporating the "So Get Up" vocal poem to date. In October 2013, it charted at number #1 on Beatport's trance music charts after being featured on Armin Van Buuren's compilation A State of Trance 2013, on Hardwell's program Hardwell On Air Episode 133, hosted by Hardwell. It was released on Cosmic Gate's album Start to Feel (2014), additional mixes by Pelari, Alex di Stefano and Ben Gold soon followed. It has been a festival favorite for the group since its release, being performed at Amsterdam Dance Event, Electric Daisy Carnival, Ultra Music Festival and on Cosmic Gate's own world tour.

== DJ Endorsement of "So Get Up" Acapella ==
"So Get Up" musical versions by their individual producers and associated DJs have been played or performed at large-scale dance parties and festivals around the global such as the Electric Daisy Carnival. But many top DJs globally have also worked directly with the acapella during live sets and broadcast playlists, either as a raw vocal interludes or creating new live mashups.

On December 19th 2015 Greek-Belgian DJ duo, brothers Dimitri Vegas & Like Mike, compounded Ithaka's "So Get Up" raw vocal with the song "Come On" by X-Filter to close their vinyl set at the Bringing The World Madness 3.0 in Antwerp, Belgium.

On February 18th, 2017, Armin Van Buuren opened a vinyl set at his own A State of Trance 800 festival in Utrecht, Netherlands by playing the unaccompanied "So Get Up" acapella.

On August 7th 2021, British house and techno club DJ Carl Cox created a live mashup combining the "So Get Up" spoken-word poem with "On Off" by Cirez D (aka Eric Prydz for his Essential Mix/BBC Radio 1 set at Newcastle upon Tyne.

On October 6th 2023, French international DJ David Guetta fused the song by "Bring Me To You" by Mark Roma and the "So Get Up" acapella for his Playlist

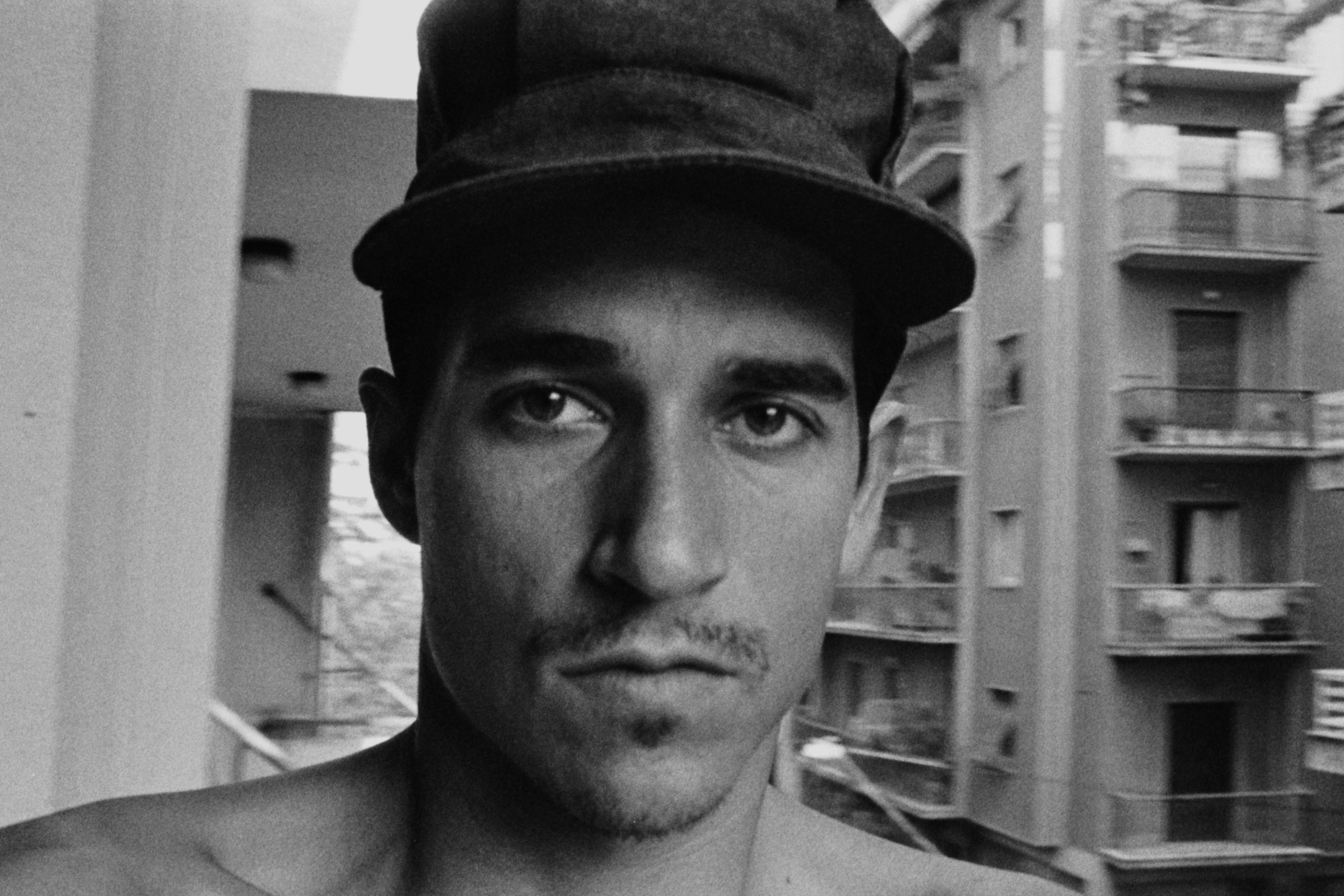
"So Get Up" lyricist Ithaka Darin Pappas in 1992

== Poem Book Releases ==
So Get Up, as a printed poem has appeared in various forms, most recently, the 35th anniversary hardbound edition was released by Sweatlodge Publishing.

== Musical Variations, Remixes, Sampling and Cover Versions ==
Documented uses of vocal and poem, So Get Up [by Ithaka Darin Pappas ©1992] in modern music appearing under varying titles. Poem was originally recorded for Radio Cómercial in Lisbon, Portugal in 1992. However, most musical versions have stemmed from unauthorized uses or sampling of the a cappella version that was re-recorded for Underground Sound of Lisbon in Portugal, 1994. Note: This incomplete list includes both legal and unauthorized uses.

=== 1992 ===
- Ithaka – Rádio Commercial Lisbon "So Get Up" (lyrics and vocals by: Ithaka) Acapella recorded December 13, 1992, with engineer Pedro Costa.

=== 1993 ===
- Ithaka "So Get Up 1993" (lyrics and vocals by: Ithaka) Electro 'demo' version recorded in Manchester, England – February 1993
- Underground Sound of Lisbon ft. Ithaka – "So Get Up" (Original Mix) Kaos Records Portugal

=== 1994 ===
- Ithaka "So Get Up" (Acapella) lyrics and vocals by: Ithaka – TRIBAL America-I.R.S.
- Underground Sound of Lisbon ft. Ithaka "So Get Up” (Factory Mix by Junior Vasquez) TRIBAL America-I.R.S.
- Underground Sound of Lisbon ft. Ithaka "So Get Up" (Junior’s Factory Dub) TRIBAL America-I.R.S.
- Underground Sound of Lisbon ft. Ithaka "So Get Up” – (Danny Tenaglia's "In The Light We Sleep" Mix) TRIBAL America-I.R.S.
- Underground Sound of Lisbon ft. Ithaka "So Get Up (Danny Tenaglia’s Get-Upella Edit) TRIBAL America-I.R.S.
- Underground Sound of Lisbon ft. Ithaka "So Get Up” (It's 4 P.M. Danny, Get Up! Dub) TRIBAL America-I.R.S.
- Orion's Voice "The Next Life (Original Mix) lyrics and vocals by: Ithaka
- Sarasite "The End of the Earth" (Jatzzup Mix) lyrics and vocals by: Ithaka - Melody Maker Records, Italy
- Sarasite "The End of the Earth" (Patrick P.D.JJ. Tribal Mix) lyrics and vocals by: Ithaka - Melody Maker Records, Italy
- Sarasite "The End of the Earth" (M.C. Hair New Wave Vibrations mix) - lyrics and vocals by: Ithaka - Melody Maker Records, Italy

=== 1995 ===
- Committee "Trance Line" (lyrics and vocals by: Ithaka) Lost Paradise Records
- Public Domain – "So Get Up" : Jeremy mix (lyrics and vocals by: Ithaka) BZRK Records, Netherlands
- Public Domain – "So Get Up" : Dr. Phil's mix (lyrics and vocals by: Ithaka) BZRK Records, Netherlands
- Public Domain – "So Get Up" : original mix (lyrics and vocals by: Ithaka) BZRK Records, Netherlands
- Pineapple Jack “Go Out Of Your Mind” (Music by: DJ The Prophet / lyrics and vocals: Ithaka) Mokum Records [Netherlands]

=== 1996 ===
- K.S. – "Fellini's Circus" - Active Bass music [Italy]
- Tecmania Rebel (a.k.a. Patrick van der Hart) – "So Get Up" – (lyrics and vocals by: Ithaka) The Violet E.P. – Planet Dance Records [Netherlands]

=== 1997 ===
- Next Generation - The Earthquake - (lyrics and vocals by: Ithaka) Ipnotika Records (Italy)
- Joystick (a.k.a. Jason "Jinx" Zambito) – "Go Insane" – (lyrics and vocals by: Ithaka) Yoshitoshi Recordings/Deep Dish Records [USA]
- Stretch & Vern – "Get Up, Go Insane !" – The Terrace Edit – (lyrics and vocals by: Ithaka) Spot On Records [UK]
- Stretch & Vern – "Get Up, Go Insane !" – Fatboy Really Lost It – (lyrics and vocals by: Ithaka) Spot On Records [UK]
- Stretch & Vern – "Get Up, Go Insane !" – Disco Dub by Fatboy Slim – (lyrics and vocals by: Ithaka) Avex Trax [China]
- Stretch & Vern – "Get Up, Go Insane !" – Moonmens Theme – (lyrics and vocals by: Ithaka) Spot On Records [UK]
- Stretch & Vern – "Get Up, Go Insane !" – Rock 'N' Roll Mix – (lyrics and vocals by: Ithaka) Spot On Records [UK]
- Stretch & Vern – "Get Up, Go Insane !" – Disco Dub Katz Mix by Fatboy Slim – (lyrics and vocals by: Ithaka) FFRR Records [UK]
- Stretch & Vern – "Get Up, Go Insane !" – Bonus Acid Beat by FatBoy Slim – (lyrics and vocals by: Ithaka) Grandslam Records / Strictly Rhythm [USA]

=== 1998 ===
- Joystick (a.k.a. Jason "Jinx" Zambito) – "Go Insane" – Go Insane Remix (lyrics and vocals by: Ithaka) Yoshitoshi Recordings/Deep Dish Records [USA]
- Joystick (a.k.a. Jason "Jinx" Zambito) – "Go Insane" – Psychic Girls' Groove (lyrics and vocals by: Ithaka) Yoshitoshi Recordings/Deep Dish Records [USA]
- Pathfinder – "So Get Up '98" – Odysee Of Life Remix(lyrics and vocals by: Ithaka) Refreshed [Germany]
- Pathfinder – "So Get Up '98" – Apocalyptic Remix (lyrics and vocals by: Ithaka) Refreshed [Germany]

=== 1999 ===
- Marcel – Viginti Etduo – (lyrics and vocals by: Ithaka) Mole Listening Pearls [Germany]
- Samsung My Jet Mix – Get Up! Go Insane! (lyrics and vocals by: Ithaka) Commercial starring Jun Ji-Hyun

=== 2000 ===
- Fatboy Slim a.k.a. Norman Cook – Fatboy Slim's Greatest Remixes – "Get Up, Go Insane!" (lyrics and vocals by: Ithaka) (lyrics, vocals) Priarity Records
- Atlantis ITA “See You In The Next Life” (original mix) music by Dino Lenny, lyrics and vocals by: Ithaka) Overodose Records, Germany
- Atlantis ITA “See You In The Next Life” Scot Project Remix) lyrics and vocals by: Ithaka - Overodose Records [Germany]
- Rui da Silva ft. Ithaka "Earth" Kismet Records [UK]

=== 2001 ===
- Ce Ce Lee – "Get Up" – (lyrics and vocals by: Ithaka) 24 Records Italy
- PCP – "Zombie" – (lyrics and vocals by: Ithaka) PTP Records [Germany], Bit Music [Spain], Hardcore Maniacs [Spain]

=== 2002 ===
- Meat Katie ft. Ithaka "Next Life" (Original Version)
- Meat Katie ft. Ithaka "Next Life" (Simon Shackleton|Elite Force]] Remix)
- Meat Katie ft. Ithaka "Next Life" (Phil Kieran Remix)
- Miss Kittin – "So Get Up" Intro Acapella – (lyrics and vocals by: Ithaka) Groove Records [Switzerland]
- K-Traxx – "Hardventure" – Original Mix – (lyrics and vocals by: Ithaka) Titanic Records, [Italy]
- High Voltage – "Go Insane" – (lyrics and vocals by: Ithaka) Sys-X Records [Netherlands]
- Dylan – "Headcharge" – (lyrics and vocals by: Ithaka <> produced by Dylan Hilsley) Earth EP – Renegade Hardware Records [UK]

=== 2003 ===
- Orion's Voice "The Next Life": (original mix) music by: Don Diablo and Brennan Heart with lyrics and vocals by: Ithaka - Re-Fuel Records [Netherlands]
- Orion's Voice "The Next Life”(Origin Unknown Remix) music by: Don Diablo and Brennan Heart with lyrics and vocals by: Ithaka - Re-Fuel Records [Netherlands]

=== 2004 ===
- Yoshi & Chia - "Turn to Dust" (lyrics & vocals by: Ithaka Darin Pappas) X-Ite Records (UK)
- Underground Sound of Lisbon ft. Ithaka "So Get Up" (Mert Yücel DeepXperience Mix) Kaos Records [Portugal]
- Underground Sound of Lisbon ft. Ithaka "So Get Up" (Eric Kupper Tribalectro Mix) Kaos Records [Portugal]
- Underground Sound of Lisbon ft. Ithaka "So Get Up" (King-Size Mix) Kaos Records [Portugal]
- Underground Sound of Lisbon ft. Ithaka "So Get Up" (Dan Robbins Three Dimension Mix) Kaos Records [Portugal]
- Underground Sound of Lisbon ft. Ithaka"So Get Up" (Low End Specialists Mix) Kaos Records [Portugal]
- Committee "Trance Line" (TCR Mix) lyrics and vocals by Ithaka Trance Corporation Recordings [Spain]

=== 2005 ===
- Architect ft. Ithaka – "Speed O.J." – ( Hymen Records [Germany]
- Meat Katie "Phat Prick/So Get Up Mashup" – (lyrics and vocals by: Ithaka/Music by: Figures) Fabric Records [UK]

=== 2006 ===
- Phobia – "All Points North" – (lyrics and vocals by: Ithaka) All Points North EP – Renegade Hardware Records [UK]
- Magik Johnson - "In The Next Life" (lyrics and vocals by: Ithaka) NRK Music [UK]

=== 2007 ===
- DJ Evol - "Next Life (lyrics & vocals by: ithaka) Combat Records [USA]
- Underground Sound of Lisbon ft. Ithaka “So Get Up” (Damaged People Remix by Lexicon Avenue) Forensic Records [UK]
- Underground Sound of Lisbon ft. Ithaka “So Get Up (Mirabeau Remix by Dave Seaman) Forensic Records [UK]
- Ray & Suly - "Oclusion" – (lyrics and vocals by: Ithaka) Echo90 Records (Spain)

=== 2008 ===
- Underground Sound of Lisbon ft. Ithaka "So Get Up" (Mowree Next Life Mix) Absolutely Records [Italy]
- Underground Sound of Lisbon ft. Ithaka ”So Get Up” (Sharp & Smooth Remix by Alex Bass and David Mimram) Absolutely Records [Italy]
- Underground Sound of Lisbon ft. Ithaka “So Get Up” (Phunk Investigation 'O' Tech Mix) Absolutely Records [Italy]
- Underground Sound of Lisbon ft. Ithaka “So Get Up” (Phunk Investigation Turbolento Mix) Absolutely Records [Italy]
- Underground Sound of Lisbon ft. Ithaka “So Get Up” (Shuffling Phunk Investigation Mix) Absolutely Records [Italy]
- DJ Zorneus – "Insane" – DJ Zorneus Mix – (lyrics and vocals by: Ithaka) Mental Madness Records [Germany]
- Lochness DJ Team – "Insane" – Lochness DJ Team Remix – (lyrics and vocals by: Ithaka) Mental Madness Records [Germany]
- Maziano – "Insane" – Maziano Remix – (lyrics and vocals by: Ithaka) Mental Madness Records [Germany]
- Dantime – "Insane" – Dantime Remix – (lyrics and vocals by: Ithaka) Mental Madness Records [Germany]
- Seikos – "Insane" – Seikos ICE507 Old Vinyl Remix – (lyrics and vocals by: Ithaka) Mental Madness Records [Germany]

=== 2009 ===
- Dan Edge - "Get Up" (lyrics and vocals by: Ithaka) Album: Ravers Addition 3 [UK]
- X-Cyte - "The Next Life" (lyrics and vocals by: Ithaka) Album: Ravers Addition 3 [UK]
- 2 DJs in a Room – "The End of the Earth" – (lyrics and vocals by: Ithaka) Album: Hardstyle Connection / Mega Prod Records [France]
- Steve Hill & Technikal – "Forget the Past" – (lyrics and vocals by: Ithaka) Album: World Series Amsterdam / Masif Records [Australia]
- Andrea Doria & Dino Lenny – "So Get Up" Cover Version – Andre Doria Mix – (lyrics by: Ithaka) Afterglow Records
- Andrea Doria & Dino Lenny – "So Get Up" Cover Version – Dino Lenny Mix – (lyrics by: Ithaka) Afterglow Records
- Andrea Doria & Dino Lenny – "So Get Up" Cover Version – Original Rework – (lyrics by: Ithaka) Afterglow Records

=== 2010 ===
- Morbus M. "Forget the Past" (lyrics & vocals by: Ithaka) Album: Forget the Past [Hands]
- Philippe Rochard – "PPF (Past Present Future)" – (lyrics and vocals by: Ithaka) Album: Angels and Demons / Sector Beatz [Switzerland]
- Peace Maker – "Turn to Dust" – (lyrics & vocals by: Ithaka) Album: Intensity / Nutek Records [Spain]
- Peace Maker "Turn to Dust" – Field Mix – (lyrics & vocals by: Ithaka) Album: California Dreaming / United Beats Records [Spain]

=== 2011 ===
- Bart Skils – "Dust" – (lyrics & vocals by: Ithaka) Tronic [Sweden]
- Mike Steventon & Tone – "Get Up" (lyrics & vocals by: Ithaka) 011, K405 Records [UK]
- Plusculaar – "Have A Blast" – (lyrics & vocals by: Ithaka) Album: Rare Species / Electronic Zoo Music
- Outworld -"Alien Life Forms, Goodbye My Friends" – (lyrics & vocals by: Ithaka) Album: Outworld /Blue Byte [Belgium]
- DJ Pibert – "Jet Airplane" – DJ Activator Remix – (lyrics & vocals by: Ithaka) Album: DJ style 2) / Hardnetmusic-Edinet Publishing [Italy]
- Horizon "Turn to Dust" – (lyrics & vocals by: Ithaka) Album: Ancient Future) Phantasm Records [UK]

=== 2012 ===
- Black Force – "Next Life" – (lyrics and vocals by: Ithaka) Part Three EP / Activa Records [Italy]
- Bageera – "Go Insane!" – (lyrics & vocals by: Ithaka) Atypical Records [Spain]
- JJ Mullor, Dani Sebert – "So Get Up" – (lyrics & vocals by: Ithaka) Supermarket Records [Spain]
- Marco Calanni – "Forget the Past" – (lyrics and vocals by: Ithaka) – Konstrukt Records [Turkey]
- Peace Maker – "Turn to Dust" – (lyrics and vocals by: Ithaka) Album: Best Of 2011 / United Beats Records [Spain]
- Hakan Sarugil – "So Get Up" – Original Mix – (lyrics and vocals by: Ithaka) Album: High Tech Soul #3 / Bliss Point Records
- Cassien Jean – "Goodbye My Friends" – (lyrics and vocals by: Ithaka) Album: Various Artists / Spur Records [Italy]
- Jay Dahbi – "Go Insane" – Extended Mix – (lyrics & vocals: Ithaka) Album: The Weekend / Soltrenz Records [USA]
- Danny Garlick – "So Get Up" – (lyrics & vocals by: Ithaka) White Mind Records [UK], Bedroom Music [USA]
- Danny Garlick – "So Get Up" – Original Mix – (lyrics and vocals by: Ithaka) Digital+ Records [Spain]
- Derek Marin – "The End of the Earth" (lyrics & vocals: Ithaka) Albums: Culture Response / Streetlight Records, Plastic City [Germany]
- Derek Marin – "The End of the Earth" – full vocal mix – (lyrics and vocals by: Ithaka) Album: Satellite Subspace / Streetlight Records [Germany]
- Derek Marin – "The End of the Earth" – Dub – (lyrics and vocals by: Ithaka) Plastic City Records [Germany]

=== 2013 ===
- Armin Van Buuren – "So Get Up" – (lyrics & vocals by: Ithaka) Album: A State Of Trance 2013 – Armada Records [Netherlands]
- Hardwell – "So Get Up" – Hardwell On Air Episode 133 Mix – (lyrics & vocals by: Ithaka)
- Cosmic Gate – "So Get Up" – (lyrics & vocals by: Ithaka) – Wake Your Mind Records [Germany]
- Cosmic Gate – "So Get Up" – Extended Mix – (lyrics & vocals by: Ithaka) Wake Your Mind Records [Netherlands]
- Cosmic Gate "So Get Up" – HeatBeat Remix – (lyrics & vocals by: Ithaka) Wake Your Mind Records [Netherlands]
- Cosmic Gate "So Get Up" – Pelari Remix – (lyrics & vocals by: Ithaka) Wake Your Mind Records [Netherlands]
- Cosmic Gate "So Get Up" – Ben Gold Remix – (lyrics & vocals by: Ithaka) Wake Your Mind Records [Netherlands]
- Cosmic Gate "So Get Up" – Radio Edit – (lyrics & vocals by: Ithaka) Album: Vonyc Sessions / Vandit Records [Germany]
- HeatBeat (Agustin Servente & Matias Chavez) – "So Get Up" – HeatBeat Remix – (lyrics & vocals by: ithaka) – Wake Your Mind Records [Germany]
- Carlos HP – "Get Up" – (lyrics & vocals by: Ithaka) YPQN Records [Spain]
- Rich Gior "Goodbye World" – (lyrics & vocals by: Ithaka) Album: Miami Vibes Productions / Dark Vibe Productions [USA]
- Audio Noir "Lick The Floor" – Original Mix – (lyrics & vocals by: Ithaka) Bonzai Progressive [Belgium]
- Damien Blaze – "Out Of Your Mind" – (lyrics & vocals by: Ithaka) Electrified Recordings
- Koozah – "Next Life" – (lyrics & vocals by: Ithaka) Next Cyclone Records [Italy]
- Koozah – "Next Life" – (lyrics & vocals by: Ithaka) Next Cyclone/Sonic Solution [Italy]
- Koozah "Next Life" – Edit – (lyrics & vocals by: Ithaka) Next Cyclone/Sonic Solution [Netherlands]
- Morgana DJ – "The Next Life" – (lyrics & vocals by: Ithaka) Emmestudio Records [Italy]
- Marcel "Viginti Etduo"- (lyrics and vocals by: Ithaka) Album: Viginti Etduo / Mole Listening Pearls [Germany]
- Bob Ray, Van Dyuk "So Get Up" – (lyrics and vocals by: Ithaka) Elektrobeats Records [Italy]
- Furio Levant – "So Get Up" – (lyrics & vocals by: Ithaka) Doctors of Chaos Records [Italy]
- Furio Levant – "So Get Up!" – Original Mix – (lyrics & vocals by: Ithaka) – Doctors Of Chaos Records [Italy]
- Slow Panpot – "The End of the Earth" – (lyrics & vocals by: Ithaka) Album: Basewate / Sibilant Records
- Koozah – "Next Life" – (lyrics & vocals by: Ithaka) Next Cyclone/Sonic Solution [Italy]
- Koozah "Next Life" – Edit – (lyrics & vocals by: Ithaka) Next Cyclone/Sonic Solution [Netherlands]

=== 2014 ===
- Ben Gold – "So Get Up" – Ben Gold Remix – (lyrics and vocals by: Ithaka) Armada Records [Netherlands]
- Pelari – "So Get Up" – Pelari Radio Edit – (lyrics and vocals by: Ithaka) Armada Records [Netherlands]
- Igor Carmo – "So Get Up" – (lyrics and vocals by: Ithaka) Nervous Records [USA]
- JJ Mullor, Dani Sbert – "So Get Up" – (lyrics and vocals by: Ithaka) Supermarket Records
- Atmozfears – "The Next Life" – (lyrics and vocals by: Ithaka) – Memory Stick Records [Netherlands]
- Loose Effects – "Get Up" – (lyrics and vocals by: Ithaka) Under Noize Records [El Salvador]
- Swing Kings – "The End of the Earth" – Original Mix – (lyrics and vocals by: Ithaka) Orange Groove Records [UK]
- Ninja, Cab Thomas – "The Next Life" – (lyrics and vocals by: Ithaka) Thundercut Records [Germany]
- Peace Maker – "Turn to Dust" – Field Mix – (lyrics and vocals by: Ithaka) United Beats Records – [Spain]
- Audio Noir – "Floorlicker" – (lyrics and vocals by: Ithaka) Albums: Club Traxx 2014, WMC Miami 2014 / Bonzai Progressive [Belgium]
- Let's Try – "Goodbye World" – (lyrics and vocals by: Ithaka) Keep It Pure Music [Turkey]
- Mr. Argenis – "The End of the Earth" – (lyrics and vocals by: Ithaka) LCA Records [France]
- Trolley Snatcha – "The End of the Earth" (lyrics and vocals by: Ithaka) Album: Archetype / Firepower Records [Canada]
- Gu'Brian – "Go Insane" – (lyrics and vocals by: Ithaka) Complex Drop Records [Peru]
- Maik Ibane – "So Get Up" – (lyrics and vocals by: Ithaka) Vendetta Records [Spain]
- Maik Ibane – "So Get Up" – Extended Mix – (lyrics and vocals by: Ithaka) Vendetta Records – [Spain]
- Micromakine – "Last Resurrection" – (lyrics and vocals by: Ithaka) Union Recordings [Poland]
- Micromakine – "Last Resurrection" – Original Mix – (lyrics and vocals by: Ithaka) Union Recordings [Poland]
- Micromakine – "Last Resurrection" – Cooh Remix – (lyrics and vocals by: Ithaka) Union Recordings [Poland]
- Acti, Antolini – "Belther" – Original Mix – (lyrics and vocals by: Ithaka) Albums: Defqon.1 2014, Q-Base / Q-Dance [Netherlands]
- Acti, Antolini – "Belther" – Orbital Edit – (lyrics and vocals by: Ithaka) Subground Records [Italy]
- Acti, Antolini – "Belther" – Extended Mix – (lyrics and vocals by: Ithaka) Subground Records [Italy]
- TNT (a.k.a. Technoboy), Tuneboy & Zatox – "Intensity" – (lyrics & vocals by: Ithaka) Album: Certified One / HARDwithSTYLE Records [Netherlands]
- TNT, Zatox – "Intensity" – Original Mix – (lyrics and vocals by: Ithaka) Q-Dance Records [Netherlands]
- TNT, Zatox – "Intensity" – Edit – (lyrics and vocals by: Ithaka) HardwithStyle Records [Netherlands]
- TNT, Zatox – "Intensity" – Radio Cut – (lyrics and vocals by: Ithaka) Titanic Records [Italy]
- TNT, Zatox – "Intensity" – Extended Version – (lyrics and vocals by: Ithaka) Titanic Records [Italy]
- DJ Kryst-Off – "Go Insane featuring Breaker" – Reloaded Mix – (lyrics and vocals by: Ithaka) Mental Madness Records [Germany]
- DJ Kryst-Off, Breaker – "Go Insane" – Bresker Old School Mix (lyrics and vocals by: Ithaka) Album: DJ Case / Mental Madness Records [Germany]
- DJ Kryst-Off, Breaker – "Go Insane" – Old School Mix – (lyrics and vocals by: Ithaka) Albums: DJ Case, Go Insane / Mental Madness – [Germany]
- DJ Kryst-Off, Breaker – "Go Insane" – Old School Edit – (lyrics and vocals by: Ithaka) Album: Go Insane / Mental Madness – [Germany]
- DJ Kryst-Off, Breaker – "Go Insane" – Handzup Mix – (lyrics and vocals by: Ithaka) Album: DJ Case / Mental Madness Records [Germany]
- DJ Kryst-Off, Breaker – "Go Insane" – HandzUp Edit – (lyrics and vocals by: Ithaka) Album: Go Insane / Mental Madness [Germany]
- DJ Kryst-Off, Breaker – "Go Insane" – Live Mix – (lyrics and vocals by: Ithaka) Album: EDM Madness / Mental Madness [Germany]
- DJ Kryst-Off, Breaker – "Go Insane" – Reloaded Mix – (lyrics and vocals by: Ithaka) Album: EDM Madness / Mental Madness [Germany]
- DJ Kryst-Off, Breaker – "Go Insane" – Reloaded Edit – (lyrics and vocals by: Ithaka) Album: Go Insane / Mental Madness [Germany]

=== 2015 ===
- DJ Lugo - "Get Up" - (lyrics and vocals by: Ithaka) Cirka Music [Venezuela]
- Razat – "Get Up" – Mash-Up Masterblast Mix – (lyrics and vocals by: Ithaka) Moscow Mule Records [Russia]
- Razat – "Get Up" – Hash-In-The Bowl Dubstep Mix – (lyrics and vocals by: Ithaka) Moscow Mule Records [Russia]
- Alex Page – "So Get Up, Atom Bride" (lyrics and vocals by: Ithaka)
- Lee Burridge – "So Get Up" – Burning Man Essential Mix – (lyrics and vocals by: Ithaka) BBC One Radio [UK]
- FuturePlays (Mexico) – "So Get Uo" – Original Mix – (lyrics and vocals by: Ithaka) Boshporus Underground Recordings [Turkey]
- Samir Kuliev – "So Get Up" – Samir Kuilev Re-Edit – (lyrics and vocals by: Ithaka) Chuvstvo Ritma Records [Russia]
- Underground Sound of Lisbon ft. Ithaka "So Get Up" (Pagano 2015 Mix) Twisted Records [USA]
- Underground Sound of Lisbon ft. Ithaka "So Get Up"(Pagano 2015 Dub) Twisted Records [USA]
- Cosmic Gate – "So Get Up"- (lyrics & vocals by: Ithaka) Start To Feel, Deluxe album version / Armada Music Bundles [Netherlands]
- Paradigm X – "The End of the Earth" – (lyrics and vocals by: Ithaka) Album UK Trendz #3 / U.K. Trendz [UK]
- Fuelo Ruedo – "It's Upon Us" – (lyrics and vocals by: Ithaka) Cats Love Bass Records [Italy]
- Fuelo Ruedo – "I'll See You" – (lyrics and vocals by: Ithaka) Cats Love Bass Records [Italy]
- Cubik, Checo Zak – "Forget the Past" (Original Mix) 2015, Dilematic Records Czech Republic
- Cubik, Checo Zak – "Forget the Past" Javas Remix Dilematic Records [Czech Republic]
- Cubik, Checo Zak – "Forget the Past" – JM Blex Remix – (lyrics and vocals by: Ithaka) Dilematic Records [Czech Republic]
- Maik Ibane – "So Get Up" – Radio Edit Blanco Y Negro Musica [Spain]
- Doppeldosen – "The End of the Earth" – (lyrics and vocals by: Ithaka) Raizo Music [Spain]
- Joseph LP – "So Get Up"- (lyrics and vocals by: Ithaka) People Tech Records [Venezuela]
- Marcel – "Viginti Etduo" – (lyrics and vocals by: Ithaka) Album: Christam Escapades/Parasol Phonoteque [Germany]
- Marcel – "Viginti Etduo" – (lyrics and vocals by: Ithaka) Album: Amsterdam Bar Longue / Parasol Phonoteque [Germany]
- Acti, Antolini – "Belther" – Orbital Edit – (lyrics and vocals by: Ithaka) Drizzly Music [Germany]
- Derek Marin – "The End of the Earth" – (lyrics and vocals by: Ithaka) Album: Plastic City Revised / Plastic City [Germany]
- Dejay D, Ozy & Ash – "The End of the Earth" – (lyrics and vocals by: Ithaka) Album: Cheeky Bounce Stompers / Cheeky Tracks Records [U.K.]
- Manu Kenton – "Get Up" – (lyrics and vocals by: Ithaka) Kentek Recordings [France]

=== 2016 ===
- Ring - "Good Bye World" – (lyrics/vocals by: Ithaka) Bullfinch Records
- Fabio Monesi - "Acid Storm" – (lyrics/vocals by: Ithaka) Russian Torrents Versions/L.I.E.S. Records
- Club Atlas (Branko/Buraka Som Sistema) – "So Get Up" – Red Bull Culture Clash Mix – (lyrics/vocals by: Ithaka) Live Coliseu dos Recreios [Portugal]
- Alex Di Stefano – "So Get Up" – Mix Cut Remix – (lyrics and vocals by: Ithaka) Black Hole Recordings
- Geometric Dark – "So Get Up" – Original Mix – (lyrics and vocals by: Ithaka) Party Label Unique Records [Netherlands]
- FuturePlays (Mexico) – "So Get Up" – Vocal Mix – (lyrics and vocals by: Ithaka) Black Habitat Records
- DJ Dũng Tí – "So Get Up" – DJ Dũng Tí – (lyrics and vocals by: Ithaka)
- Cosmic Gate – "So Get Up" – Alex Di Stefano Extended Remix – (lyrics and vocals by: Ithaka) Wake Your Mind/Armada [Netherlands]
- Cosmic Gate – "So Get Up" – Alex Di Stefano Extended Remix – (lyrics and vocals by: Ithaka) Black Hole Recordings – Netherlands
- Meat Katie – "Next Life" – (lyrics and vocals by: Ithaka) album: Back In The Day – Lowering The Tone Records [U.K.]
- Marc Hartman – "A Place You've Never Been Before" – (lyrics and vocals by: Ithaka) album: Changes – Lemon Grass Music [Germany]
- TNT, Zatox – "Intensity" – Extended Version – (lyrics and vocals by: Ithaka) Starlight Records [Italy]
- Pepo, Pacho – "Next Life" – (lyrics and vocals by: Ithaka) Be One Limited Records [Spain]
- Geometric Dark – "So Get Up" – (lyrics and vocals by: Ithaka)Party Label Unique Records [Netherlands]
- Nell Silva – "So Get Up" – 22 Years Of So Get Up – (lyrics and vocals by: Ithaka) Desire Records [Portugal]
- Nell Silva – "So Get Up" – Vortex Version – (lyrics and vocals by: Ithaka) Desire Records [Portugal]
- Nell Silva – "So Get Up" – Original Version remastered – (lyrics and vocals by: Ithaka) Desire Records [Portugal]
- Nell Silva – "So Get Up" – Vortex Version remastered 2016, Desire Records [Portugal]
- Acti, Antolini – "Belther" – Orbital Edit – (lyrics and vocals by: Ithaka)Berlin Sensation [Germany]
- DANTEE, Alternative Journey – "The End of the Earth" – (lyrics and vocals by: Ithaka) album: Brazil Generation #3
- Swing Kings – "The End of the Earth" – (lyrics and vocals by: Ithaka) album: The Disco LP 2 – Orange Groove Records [UK]
- ZRG – "Forget the Past" – Chris Drifter Remix (lyrics and vocals by: Ithaka) album: Club Runner – GR8 AL Music [Belgium]
- ZRG – "Forget the Past" – Chris Drifter Remix (lyrics and vocals by: Ithaka) album: House Running – GR8 AL Music [Belgium]
- Dr. Funk – "Get Up" – (lyrics and vocals by: Ithaka) album: Phunked Up – Foolish Records [Netherlands]
- Dani Villa, Rodri Vegas – "Get Up" – (lyrics and vocals by: Ithaka) Dropper Get Up E.P. – Patent Skills Records Bulgaria

=== 2017 ===
- Ithaka – "So Get Up 2017" (lyrics and vocals by: Ithaka) – Album: So Get Up & The Lost Acapellas (Sweatlodge Records)
- Armin Van Buuren – "So Get Up" – Armin's Acapella Mix (lyrics and vocals by: Ithaka) Performed Live Feb. 18th – ASOT Festival [Utrecht, Netherlands]
- Rui Flip – "All Turn to Dust" – (music and vocals: Rui Flip <> lyrics: Ithaka) Dogmain Records [Portugal]
- 2017 Violet, BLEID, Caroline Lethô, EDND, Yen Sung (feat. Belita, Maria Amor, Sonja) – "So Get Up – IWD Cover Version" – (lyrics by: Ithaka) Equality Now Records [UK]
- Township Rebellion – "Next Life" – (lyrics and vocals by: Ithaka Darin Pappas) Stil Vor Talent [Germany]
- Frankyeffe vs. Ithaka – "So Get Up" – (lyrics and vocals by: Ithaka Darin Pappas) Phobiq Records (Italy)
- Hu Bee featuring Ithaka – "New World" – (lyrics and vocals by: Ithaka Darin Pappas) TED Records [France]
- Underground Sound of Lisbon ft. Ithaka “So Get Up” (Adam Freemer RM-X) Twisted Records
- Jay Dahbi – "Go Insane" – Original Mix – (lyrics and vocals by: Ithaka) album: The Weekend – Soltrenz Records [NY, USA]
- Jay Dahbi – "Go Insane" – Extended Mix – (lyrics and vocals by: Ithaka) album: The Weekend – Soltrenz Records [NY, USA]
- Chaka & Marty – "Goodbye World" – (lyrics and vocals by: Ithaka) (album: Visions Of Tech House) RH2 [Germany]
- MotivBreaks – "Forget the Past" – Original Mix – (lyrics and vocals by: Ithaka) Fantomas Records [Greece]
- MotivBreaks – "Forget the Past" – Perfect Kombo Mix – (lyrics and vocals by: Ithaka) Fantomas Records [Greece]
- Liquid Viking – "The End of the Earth" – (lyrics and vocals by: Ithaka Darin Pappas) Uxmal Records, Mexico
- Omar Lopez – "Have A Blast" – (lyrics and vocals by: Ithaka Darin Pappas) Darkside Digital Records [Argentina]
- Neanderthal Phonogram – "Forget the Past" – Dj Kryst-Off & Betrand Mix -(lyrics and vocals by: Ithaka) Records [Germany]
- Neanderthal Phonogram – "Forget the Past" – Dj Kryst-Off & Betrand Edit – (lyrics and vocals by: Ithaka) Aqualoop [Germany]
- Neanderthal Phonogram – "Forget the Past" – Pulsedriver Remix – (lyrics and vocals by: Ithaka) Aqualoop [Germany]
- Matheu – "So Get Up" – (lyrics and vocals by: Ithaka Darin Pappas) Vecto Records [Columbia]
- Pirro – "So Get Up" – (lyrics and vocals by: Ithaka Darin Pappas) Run Records [Argentina]
- Rab-Beat – "So Get Up" – (lyrics and vocals by: Ithaka Darin Pappas) Sector Beatz Records [Switzerland]
- U.S.L. – "So Get Up" – Original & King Size Mix – (lyrics and vocals by: Ithaka) album: Totally Kaos Mix Kaos [Portugal]
- Underground Sound Of Lisbon ft. Ithaka "So Get Up" – (Danny's Get Upella) Total Kaos – Kaos [Portugal]
- Joseph LP – "So Get Up" – (lyrics and vocals by: Ithaka) album: The Sound Of Brothers / People Tech Records [Spain]
- Public Domain – "So Get Up" – (lyrics and vocals by: Ithaka) Derailed Traxx/Be Yourself Music [Netherlands]

=== 2018 ===
- Dual Shock - "Get Up" - (lyrics and vocals by: Ithaka) Midijum Records [Germany]
- Sebastien Pedro - "Hurt" (lyrics and vocals by: Ithaka) Berlin After Dark Records
- Nathan D "The End of the Earth Is Upon Us" (lyrics and vocals by: Ithaka)
- Orion (Br) & DropGrade - "So Get Up" (lyrics and vocals by: Ithaka) Purple Haze Records.
- DJ Healer (a.k.a. Traumprinz) featuring Ithaka – "End of the World" – (lyrics and vocals by: Ithaka) Album: Planet Lonely/Label: Planet Uterus
- Dostech - "Get Up" - (lyrics and vocals by: Ithaka)
- VV303 - "So Get Up (2018 Bunker Remix)" - lyrics and vocals by: Ithaka
- Mitekss - "So Get Up" - (lyrics and vocals by: Ithaka)
- Mitekss - "So Get Up (Marcos Salas Remix)" - lyrics and vocals by: Ithaka
- Sebastien Pedro - "Hurt" - (lyrics and vocals by: Ithaka) Berlin After Dark
- Crypton - "The Next Life" - (lyrics and vocals by: Ithaka) Q-Dance
- Crypton - "The Next Life (Extended Mix)" - (lyrics and vocals by: Ithaka) Q-Dance
- DJ Delivery - "It Will All Turn to Dust" - (lyrics and vocals by: Ithaka) Black Box
- David Tech - "Next Life" - (lyrics and vocals by: Ithaka) DZB
- KTK - "End of the Earth" - (lyrics and vocals by: Ithaka) Kaleidoscope
- Synctrex - "So Get Up" (lyrics and vocals by: Ithaka)
- DJ Jonibigodes - "So Get Up" (lyrics and vocals by: Ithaka)

=== 2019 ===
- Crank der Dirigent - "Good Bye World" - (lyrics and vocals by: Ithaka) Flair Berlin Records [Germany
- DJ Swat - "Good Bye World" - original mix (lyrics and vocals by: Ithaka) [Hungary
- DJ Swat - "Good Bye World" - full minimal remix (lyrics and vocals by: Ithaka) [Hungary]
- Joy Marquez - "Next Life" (lyrics and vocals by: Ithaka) Records [Mexico]
- Sai & I - "End Of Earth" [Columbia]
- Rejectiorz - "So Get Up" [Mexico]
- DJ Snat featuring Ithaka – "The End Is Nigh" (lyrics and vocals by: Ithaka) Corecube - Russia
- HugoP - "So Get Up (Remake)" (lyrics and vocals by: Ithaka)
- John Neiland featuring Ithaka – "The End Is Nigh" – (lyrics and vocals by: Ithaka)
- Br1an featuring Ithaka "Upon Us" – (lyrics & vocals by: Ithaka) 1A Recordings
- Stretch N Vern - "Get Up! Go Insane!" - The Terrace Edit (lyrics and vocals by: Ithaka) London Recordings
- Stretch N Vern - "Get Up! Go Insane!" KDA Let Me Be Remix 2019 (lyrics and vocals by: Ithaka) London Recordings
- Stretch N Vern - "Get Up! Go Insane!" Plump DJs Remix 2019 (lyrics and vocals by: Ithaka) London Recordings
- Stretch N Vern - "Get Up! Go Insane!" K & K Remix 2019 (lyrics and vocals by: Ithaka) London Recordings
- Stretch N Vern - "Get Up! Go Insane!" Fatboy Disco Dub (lyrics and vocals by: Ithaka) London Recordings
- Stretch N Vern - "Get Up! Go Insane!" Fatboy's Really Lost It (lyrics and vocals by: Ithaka) London Recordings

=== 2020 ===
- Outsiders - "1000 Miles" (lyrics and vocals by: Ithaka) Sacred Technology [Israel]
- Hidden Secret - "Get Outa Here" (lyrics and vocals by: Ithaka) TSD REcords [Germany]
- El Jack - "Next Life" (lyrics and vocals by: Ithaka) Muscaria Project [Mexico]
- Rick Silva - "Get Up!!" (lyrics and vocals by: Ithaka) House Of Rhythm Records [Mexico]
- Alvaro Miranda & Spencer - "Get Up" (lyrics and vocals by: Ithaka)
- Joe Waudby - "Next Life" (lyrics and vocals by: Ithaka)
- Insanatix - "Go Insane" (lyrics and vocals by: Ithaka) Gearbox Digital Records
- Forgiven X Derex - "The End of the Earth" (lyrics and vocals by: Ithaka) FL Studio 20 Records
- Pomella - "So Get Up" (lyrics and vocals by: Ithaka) Ithica Records/France, Belgium
- Second Nature - "So Get Up" (sunrise mix) - (lyrics and vocals by: Ithaka) Portugal
- Alien Project - "Get Up" - (lyrics and vocals by: Ithaka) H2O Music
- Dade (ITA) "Get Up" Original Mix - (lyrics and vocals by: Ithaka) Shaman/Pressology(Italy)
- Dade (ITA) "Get Up" Parente Remix - (lyrics and vocals by: Ithaka) Shaman/Pressology (Italy)
- Dade (ITA) "Get Up" Parenti/Gioveri Remix - (lyrics and vocals by: Ithaka) Shaman/Pressology (Italy)
- Niko - "So Get Up" (lyrics and vocals by: Ithaka) Niko Music Records (Brazil)
- DJ Pandemora "So Get Up" (lyrics and vocals by: Ithaka
- Paolo Barbato & Lineka - "See You In The Next Life" (lyrics and vocals by: Ithaka) Graba Music Group

=== 2021 ===
- Sovax - "Get Up" (lyrics and vocals by: ithaka) Dusty Nose
- Arturo Diaz - "So Get Up" (lyrics and vocals by: ithaka) Coronita
- Sgarra - "So Get Up" (lyrics and vocals by: ithaka) Woolly Woolly
- Darkinox - "Next Life" (lyrics and vocals by: ithaka) Noisj.nl Records

=== 2023 ===
- DJ AniMe w/ Broken Minds "Go Insane" (lyrics and vocals by: ithaka) Dogfight

- Ciro Leone "Goodbye My Friend" ft. ithaka (lyrics and vocals by: ithaka)

=== 2024 ===
- The Element MT "Upon Us" (lyrics and vocals by: ithaka)

=== 2025 ===
- Tom Sawyer "Get Up" (lyrics and vocals by: ithaka)

=== 2026 ===
- Zombie Nation "Kernkraft 400 (Apocalyptic Mix)" (production by Technoboy with lyrics and vocals by: ithaka)
- Nocturne (ofc) "Upon Us" (lyrics and vocals by: ithaka)
- Steam 03 "Forget The Past" (lyrics and vocals by: ithaka)

== Articles about "So Get Up" and its derivatives ==
- 2013 Magnetic Magazine [USA] Regarding version by Cosmic Gate: written by Hannah DeuPree
- 2013 Daily Beat [USA] Regarding version by Cosmic Gate: written by Hugh Lurcott
- 2013 UP Magazine [Portugal] Regarding the origins of So Get Up's a cappella: written by Maria Ana Ventura
- 2013 Redbull [International] "It Happened Here" Regarding the origins of So Get Up in Portugal
- 2014 DJ Mag [Netherlands] Regarding versions by Cosmic Gate: written by Ruben De Ronde
- 2015 Earmilk [USA] Regarding Armin Van Buuren/Cosmic Gate collaboration, mentioning So Get Up: written by Steph Evans
- 2015 Flash DC [USA] Regarding the origins of So Get Up
- 2017 Rimas e Batidas [Portugal] Mentions Ithaka's "So Get Up" vocal as most sampled acapella in the world: written by Hugo Jorge
- 2018 Redbull [International] "Essential Portuguese Club Tracks" by Sammy Lee
- 2019 Red Bull Music Academy
- 2025 DJ Mag "New documentary explores ‘90s rave culture in Portugal"

== See also ==
- List of songs subject to plagiarism disputes
