= You (DJ Vibe song) =

2007 single by DJ Vibe & Ithaka

Single by DJ Vibe, Ithaka
- Released: 19 January 2007
- Genre: House; progressive house; tribal house
- Length: 7:38
- Label: Kaos Records (Portugal) - Vidsco
- Songwriters: António Manuel Portela Alves Pereira; Ithaka Darin Pappas
- Producer: DJ Vibe

Music video
- "You" on YouTube

"You" is a tech house song by Portuguese electronic music artist DJ Vibe (#40 globally on DJ Mag's 2008 list) and Californian lyricist-vocalist Ithaka (nine-time Prémio Blitz nominee).

"You" was the second track DJ Vibe (António Manuel Portela Alves Pereira) and Ithaka (or Ithaka Darin Pappas) had recorded together, the first being the 1994 song "So Get Up" made by Underground Sound of Lisbon (consisting of members DJ Vibe and Rui da Silva), which featured Ithaka on lyrics and vocals.

DJ Vibe recorded the "You" instrumental during a period of several weeks at The Cave Studio in Lisbon with sound engineer and mixer Henri Sanrame. Ithaka's vocals were recorded by Sanrame in 2002 (also at The Cave). The executive producer of the release was António Cunha (founder of Kaos Records).

You (Original Mix) first previewed on DJ Vibe's 2006 mix compilation Global Grooves 03, which sold more than 45,000 copies in Portugal, its country of original release.

The following year, in 2007, "You" was released as both a 12" vinyl (including a remix by Peter Bailey and Ithaka's isolated spoken-word a cappella) and also on an enhanced Digipak CD that additionally included the Global Grooves 03 edit and a music video by Edgar Pera. Both versions came out on Kaos Records. Distribution was handled by Vidisco (Portugal).

== Peter Bailey Remix ==
Raised in Staten Island, and influenced by the techno and acid house surge that hit NYC in the early 90s, Peter Bailey's remix interpretation of "You" has been described as tough tribal. Peter Bailey's remix of "You" appeared on the 2008 compilation Blended Sound 002 released by Chus & Ceballos, Joubin on the Canadian label Mile End Records.

== DJ Riot Remix ==
DJ Riot (Rui Pedro Soares Da Silva Pité) of the internationally recognized Portuguese project Buraka Som Sistema also remixed "You", released on the 2009 compilation Total Kaos 09.

== Video ==
Filmed, directed, and edited in Tokyo's Shibuya-ku district by Portuguese filmmaker, fine artist, and graphic novelist, Edgar Pêra, this tech house music video features deliberately lo-fi television textures and prominent futuristic lyric subtitles.

The imagery follows two androids, Beatrix Droid and Henry Droid, who wear humorous, cartoonish masks to hide their robotic identities. They walk the streets of Shibuya, attempting to assimilate into humanity undetected; running, dancing, and smoking cigarettes. However, their disguises fail to convince anyone, as passersby quickly sense that something is unusual about the pair. Instead of being frightened, citizens begin mocking the droids, in turn angering them.

Unexpectedly, Beatrix and Henry then encounter two more androids, wearing equally ridiculous disguises. A bond of mutual recognition forms, and the four join forces to conquer Tokyo.

Note: When Ithaka Darin Pappas first moved to Lisbon, Portugal in 1992, his first contracted form of employment was making still photographs on two of Edgar Pêra's films "SWK4" (1993) and "Manual Of Evasion LX94" (1994), produced by Companhia de Filmes do Principe Real, owned by Inês de Medeiros.

== Compilations ==
Since its initial Global Grooves 03 appearance in 2006, "You" by DJ Vibe & Ithaka has appeared on a number of other compilations including:

- Dubfire – Taipei: GU31 (released by Global Underground UK)
- Kaos Records One Hundred (released by Kaos Records Portugal)
- Chus & Ceballos, Joubin – Blended Sound 002 Mile End Records (Canada)
- Total Kaos 09 (released by Kaos Records Portugal)
- Progressive House (released by Ice Records - Russia)
- Os Hits Dos Melhores 44 DJs (released by Vidisco - Portugal
- Agosto #123 (released by Dance Club Magazine - Portugal)
- Annual Summer Portugal (released by Farol Records - Portugal)
- Orbital Mix (released by Vidisco Portugal)

== DJ endorsements ==
On April 14, 2007 Carl Cox played DJ Vibe featuring Ithaka "You" during his set at Future Music Festival in Brisbane, Australia.

On October 13, 2007 David Morales played "You" by DJ Vibe featuring Ithaka at 20 Years Def Mix Tour, Pacha in New York City.

== Sonic inspirations, samples and lyrics ==
DJ Vibe's instrumental production for the Original Mix of "You" featuring Ithaka was largely based on the 1990 song "Searchin' by Washington DC project, 33 1/3 Queen.

Peter Bailey's remix of "You" included all original programming, with no listed sampling.

Ithaka Darin Pappas' lyrics for "You" were borrowed from his own early poem, "We Are The Players" (from the Lost Acapellas collection). This rhyming spoken-word poem had been used previously on Ithaka's own song entitled "778" that appeared on the 1998 compilation Ao Vivo Na Antena 3 (or Live On Antena 3) released by NorteSul-Valentim de Carvalho-EMI.

== Publishing ==
"You" by DJ Vibe featuring Ithaka is published by Sociedade Portuguesa de Autores, Rossio Music (Portugal), Ravenshark Music/North Music Group, BMG Gold Songs, and American Society of Composers, Authors and Publishers. The ISRC numbers for Original Mix are: PTVI10702033, QMDA61825348. The ISRC number for the Peter Bailey mix is:PTVI10900346.
