= Dance with Me (Underground Sound of Lisbon song) =

1993 single by Underground Sound of Lisbon

"Dance With Me"

Single by Underground Sound of Lisbon
- Released: 19 December 1993
- Genre: house; Progressive house; Tribal house
- Length: 7:38
- Label: Kaos Records (Portugal) - VIDISCO; Tribal America / I.R.S. Records/EMI Records*
- Songwriters: Rui Jorge Martins Pacheco da Silva; António Manuel Portela Alves Pereira
- Producers: DJ Vibe; Rui da Silva

Underground Sound of Lisbon singles chronology
"Dance With Me" (1993)	"So Get up" (1994)

Music video
- "Dance With Me" on YouTube

"Dance With Me" is a progressive house music song by Portuguese electronic music duo Underground Sound of Lisbon, (or U.S.L.).

This was the first recording by U.S.L., formed by Rui da Silva, producer of the #1 hit "Touch Me" - and DJ Vibe, who in 2008 was ranked #40 globally by DJ Mag.

Dance With Me was released on Kaos Records Portugal in late 1993 as the A-Side of their debut 12" promo entitled Chapter One. Distribution was later handled by VIDISCO (Portugal).

The song was licensed the next year by Tribal America Records and put out internationally as an extra track on the double-vinyl 12" remix release of Underground Sound of Lisbon's So Get Up ft. Ithaka.

== Compilations ==
Dance With Me was also released on a series of Kaos Records compilations including; Totally Kaos – The Singles Summer 94, Total Kaos (Underground House From A Paradise Called Portugal), DJ Vibe – Kaos Totally Mixed (More Portuguese House Beatmixed Absolutely Live), Early Years - The Singles Collection 1993 - 1998 and on Kaos Totally Mix 3 - Portugal All Stars.

International compilations have included Rebirth an independent UK release, DJ Mag's 1994 magazine accompaniment compilation CD entitled, The Night Before / The Morning After mixed by Danny Tenaglia and Coldcut and on John Digweed's Renaissance - The Mix Collection - Part 2 (1995).

In 2003, Dance With Me was re-released digitally by Kismet Records (UK).

== Reception ==
DJ Rankings has called Dance With Me, An underground classic.

== Samples ==
Dance With Me contains three prominent samples; Age of Love by Age of Love, Operaattack by Grace Jones and Moby's "Go" (Woodtick Mix).

== Publishing ==
"Dance With Me" by Underground Sound of Lisbon is published by Sociedade Portuguesa de Autores, Rossio Music (Portugal), Notting Hill Music (UK). The ISRC numer is: ISRC PTVI19800025.
