= Paraíso (2025 film) =

Documentary film about Portuguese rave culture in the 1990s

- Directed by: Daniel Mota
- Produced by: João Evredosa, Maria Guedes
- Starring: Yen Sung, DJ Morgana, Paulo Leite, Luís Leite, DJ Vibe, Danny Tenaglia, Rui da Silva, etc.
- Production company: Shipton House
- Release date: May 4, 2025 (IndieLisboa)
- Country: Portugal
- Languages: Portuguese, English

Paraíso is a 2025 award-winning documentary film about electronic dance music primarily focusing on Portugal in the 1990s (the decade widely considered the golden age of Rave culture in the country). It was directed by Daniel Mota and produced by João Evredosa and Maria Guedes. It premiered at the IndieLisboa film festival in Portugal on May 4, 2025.

Dance Club magazine wrote of Paraíso, The title refers to a phrase published in the defunct magazine Muzik, when a journalist described the phenomenon of Portuguese parties as "A Paradise Called Portugal"—an expression that would end up symbolizing a brief but remarkable phase of the national club culture. This international projection was largely due to "So Get Up", by Lisbon's Underground Sound—a "B-side" track with lyrics and vocals by Californian Ithaka Darin Pappas, which ended up becoming an unexpected hit, as DJ Vibe and Rui da Silva recall.

The 78-minute film, edited by Henrique Brazão, was created by montaging together hundreds of hours of archival home VHS video tapes, television reports from RTP, SIC and MTV and thousands of still photographs, along with thirty-eight recent interviews with scene insider DJs, producers, dancers and producers including; Yen Sung, Alex FX, Carlos Fauvrelle, Carlos Manaça, Paulo Leite, Luís Leite, The Advent, DJ Vibe, Frank Maurel, Luis "XL" Garcia, Miss Sheila, Nuno Cacho, Rui da Silva and Rob di Stefano.

The film discusses the early humble origins of electronic music in Portugal; its clubs such as Kremlin, Alcântara-Mar and Frágil, its underground record labels, and its unique large scale dance parties, often held at historical sites such as the Santa Maria da Feira castle.

The film also reflects on the global attention the movement began receiving in 1994 after the release of "So Get Up" by the duo Underground Sound of Lisbon who incorporated a 1992 literary work written and vocalized by Greek-Californian artist Ithaka (Ithaka Darin Pappas) as the memorable intro and vocal hook. World-renowned DJ, Danny Tenaglia also makes an appearance to discuss his own remix of "So Get Up" which, more than thirty years after its initial release, remains one of the era's most enduring tribal house tracks.

== Festival Reception ==
The film premiered to a sold out theater at the IndieLisboa festival in Lisbon, Portugal on May 4, 2025, and was immediately shown again at Culturgest – Fundação Caixa Geral de Depósitos on May 10 to another sold-out house.

In October 2025, Paraíso was included in the official selection of the Melkweg festival in Amsterdam.

In November 2025, Paraiso was screened at the Caminhos do Cinema Português film festival in Coimbra. There it received two awards; "Best Documentary" and the "FILMin Audience Choice Award."

On May 28th 2026 Paraíso screened at Rio Cinema, Dalston in East London as part of the 2026 Doc'n Roll Film Festival.

Journalist Jorge Mourinho of the Portuguese newspaper Público, who gave the project a three star rating, says of the film, In relation to the wave of Portuguese documentaries that have premiered in 2025, Paraíso presents several unique features that make it stand out. First: it arrives in theaters without significant delay, having premiered in May at IndieLisboa. Second: it enters the commercial circuit with a capital gain of sympathy, given an enthusiastic reaction from the public that—a rare occurrence—demanded the scheduling of additional screenings at the festival. Most importantly: the pioneering role that Daniel Mota's film plays in illuminating the Portuguese nights of the 1990s in electronic dance music, the party culture that came to be known as raves, and which even had global success in "So Get Up" by Underground Sound of Lisbon and Ithaka. Paraíso is a dive into a scene that may have gone unnoticed by more conventional audiences, but which, before the discovery of Portugal by "digital nomads", had already elevated our country to an enviable reputation within the global community of DJs and partygoers—at one point it was said that we would be "the next Ibiza". We didn't quite get there, but we came close.

UK writer Joe Delon, of the youth-culture website Buttondown wrote that the film tells the story behind the phrase “Underground house music from a paradise called Portugal”, examining portugal's electronic dance music scene during the 1990s and its subsequent decline in the 2000s. Delon also discussed the influence of exchanges between Portuguese and American DJs and promoters on the development of the scene, citing DannyTenaglia's description of the music as "not techno, not house" or trance, but something that created a "trance-like state".

== Mainstream Showings and Streaming ==
In late October 2025, Paraíso began showing in mainstream Portuguese theaters and was released on the European streaming channel Filmin on September 17th, 2026..

== Awards ==
- "Best Documentary" Caminhos de Cinema Português Festival (Nov 2025)
- "FILMin Audience Choice Award" Caminhos de Cinema Português Festival (Nov 2025)
