= Mile End Records =

Mile End Records is an independent record label based in Montreal, Quebec, Canada. It was started in 2005 by Producer/DJ Patrick Dream and MIXART Studios' Kirk Coleman. It is a predominantly house music label that draws on a growing collective of top musicians, producers and DJs, dedicated to Montreal music and its worldwide appreciation.

== History ==
In 2005, Kirk Coleman of MIXART Studios was exploring the possibility of purchasing music label Bombay Records to be combined with a network of international producers in an effort to promote local Montreal talent. Patrick Dream, a partner in Bombay Records sold his shares to concentrate on producing and DJing. As a result, Coleman and Dream founded Mile End Records and initial projects such as the release of Chez Nous 1, showcased the diversity of Montreal electronic producers. The first single to be released by Mile End was by deep house legend Roy Davis Jr.

Mile End records also has reached out and work with European DJs/producers. Portuguese producer DJ Vibe teamed up with Montreal's Stephan Grondin on Stereo Sound:01; a double CD compilation. Montreal producer Joubin matched up with Spanish duo Chus & Ceballos for Blended Sound:02. Mile End in 2010 released the next installment in Chez Nous series- releasing Chez Nous 2 mixed and compiled by Vivie- Ann.

The name is inspired by the Montreal neighborhood called Mile End which since the 1980s has been an artistic center and home to many artists, musicians, writers and filmmakers as well as a culturally diverse area. Patrick Dream was living there at the time when the label was founded and it came to symbolize a creative, musical and stylistic diversity and that would be reflected in the releases and albums of the label.

Mile End has since released music of other genres such as soul and funk but under the MIXART Production brand to distinguish any release that is not classified as electronic such as tracks by French soul singer Rachelle Jeanty.

== Artists ==
- Chus & Ceballos
- Roy Davis Jr.
- Patrick Dream
- Marco Gotama
- My Favorite Robot
- Omid16B
- Hector Couto
- Elevator People
- Miguel Graca
- Stephan Grondin
- Blond:ish
- Regan Grey
- Jaimy
- James Teej
- Joubin
- Fadel
- Angel Moraes
- Darius Syrossian
- Danny Buddha Morales
- Omar Cito Perez
- Julien Prince
- Steve Bear Sas
- Nicola Torriero
- Dj Vibe
- Vivie-Ann
- Miles Moore
- Lee Walker

== Releases ==
- Everybody (2006)
- Goodlife (2006)
- What I'm Saying (2006)
- Real Deal (2007)
- Feet Don't Fall (2007)
- Why Do I Luv Muzik EP (2007)
- Real Deal Remixes (2007)
- Stereostar Remixes (2007)
- What I'm Saying Remixes (2007)
- Stereo Sound 001 (2007)
- Why Do I Luv Muzik Remixes (2008)
- White is Pure 7: Trance Mix (2008)
- Red Lite Series 5 (Continuous DJ Mix) (2008)
- Booty Pop feat. Gouchy Boy & Amanda (2008)
- Levitate (2008)
- Reach Up (2009)
- Magic Carpet Ride (2009)
- Blended Sound 002 (2009)
- Heartbroken Reprise (2009)
- Pleasure 31 (2009)
- White is Pure 8 (2009)
- Red Lite Series 6 (2009)
- Fascination (2010)
- Strings of Life 2010 (2010)
- Dressed in White (2010)
- The Darker Side (2010)
- A Stereo Tribute (2010)
- Sueno Mio feat. Cito (2010)
- Makin' Sense EP (2010)
- Giger (2010)
- KissKiss (2010)
- Solar System (2010)
- Got It EP (2012)
- Go Back EP (2014)
- Freak Foundation (2014)

== Discography ==
- Chez Nous 2

== See also ==
- Mile End, Montreal
- List of record labels
