= Yen Sung =

Portuguese DJ and record producer

- Yen Sung in Lisbon

Background information
- Born: 1970 (age 54–55); Beira, Mozambique
- Genres: Tribal house, US garage, techno, Hip hop
- Occupation(s): Record producer, DJ, remixer, Vocalist
- Years active: 1992 until present
- Labels: Atlantic Jaxx, Compost Records

Born in Mozambique, based in Lisbon,Yen Sung, sometimes referenced as Portugal’s First Lady of Dance Music, is a female DJ, vocalist and electronic music producer of Portuguese, African and Chinese descent. For three decades, Yen Sung has been at the center of Lisbon's club scene as a longstanding resident House music DJ at club Frágil and its successor Luxfrágil, where she has also hosted her own "Chocolate City" Hip hop, R & B, Soul and funk events. She has released a handful of singles. One of them, entitled "Do You", was released by Atlantic Jaxx records founded by British electronic music duo Basement Jaxx.

In 2023, she made her first DJing appearance in New York City and weeks later played New Year's Eve at Berghain's prestigious Panorama Bar in Berlin, opening for world renowned German DJ/producer Boris Brejcha.

== Early Life and Influences ==
Yen Yung was born in 1970 in Beira, Mozambique, to parents of Portuguese, African and Chinese backgrounds. Fleeing the Mozambican Civil War that followed the end of Portuguese rule, she and her family moved to Lisbon in 1977.

Yen Sung grew up listening to her father's record collection, a mix of performers like Shirley Bassey, Marvin Gaye, Gilberto Gil and African artists like Bonga. Later as a teenager she developed a taste for dancing and clubbing at afternoon parties in the Lisbon, listening to pop, soul and African music like Kizomba and Funaná.

== Career Beginnings ==
In 1992, after asking for a job in the coatroom of Lisbon's most notorious nightclub, Frágil. Club owner, Manuel Reis, instead offered Yen Sung a job as a DJ. She had very little experience, but with a few practice sessions, her residency had essentially already begun.

Yen was not only the first female career DJ in Portugal, she was also the first Portuguese hip hop DJ (male of female). It began when another boss at Frágil, suggested she do an Acid jazz night. "Why do acid jazz? Everywhere is playing that." Yen told him, "I think we should do a hip hop night.", but he declined.

She then partnered with rapper-poet Ithaka Darin Pappas (So Get Up, Escape From the City of Angels) and the two began approaching dive bars in the then dilapidated Cais do Sodré area to do hip hop events. One of them, called Viking, accepted. Ithaka, a Californian living in Portugal, was the doorman/promotor and Yen Sung was the DJ. Audiences grew and parties soon had to be moved to a warehouse in the Santos district on the docks of the Tagus River, where Yen would also play instrumental tracks to include an Open mic session for upstart MCs.

In 1993, Yen Sung as a vocalist/DJ co-founded the early Hip-hop tuga project Da Weasel along with Angolan-born rapper Carlão. She left the project in 1997 to concentrate on DJing full-time.

== Film Appearance ==
In 2025, Sung appeared in the award-winning documentary film Paraíso about the origins of Electronic music and rave culture in Portugal. The project was directed by Daniel Mota and produced by João Evredosa and Maria Guedes and also features Danny Tenaglia, DJ Vibe, Rui da Silva and other well known djs and industry insiders. It premiered at the IndieLisboa film festival in Portugal on May 4th 2025 and showed in theaters around the country.

== Releases ==
- 2002 Yen Sung “Do You” (Atlantic Jaxx/Basement Jaxx) .
- 2021 “Still” Yen Sung & Photonz (Alphabet Street)
- 2022 “A Temperança” Yen Sung & Photonz (Alphabet Street)

== In Popular Culture ==
In 2024, Portuguese painter Panmela Castro created a large scale oil portrait of Yen Sung that was included in her solo showing at Lisbon's Galeria Francisco Fino.
