= Rui da Silva =

Rui da Silva may refer to:

- Rui da Silva (field hockey) (born 1939), Hong Kong field hockey player
- Rui da Silva (athlete) (1951–1999), Brazilian sprinter
- Rui da Silva (DJ) (born 1968), Portuguese producer and DJ
