= David Penn (DJ) =

Spanish DJ, producer and remixer

- Born: 17 April 1972 (age 54); Madrid, Spain
- Genres: House music
- Occupations: Record producer, Musician
- Years active: 2002-present
- Labels: Urbana Recordings, Defected Records
- Website: http://djdavidpenn.com/

David Penn is a Spanish DJ, producer and remixer, internationally known on the house music scene.

== Biography ==
David Penn is one of Spain’s best-known DJs and producers of house music. In the 2000s, he collaborated often with DJ Chus to produce house and garage house tracks. Urbana recordings is his own imprint. As a DJ, Penn has more than 15 years of experience.

Recently, he played as a DJ for big labels like Defected and Glitterbox all over Europe. Moreover, he played often at the Defected Croatia festival.

In December 2019, David Penn was awarded Best House Artist of 2019 by Traxsource. In April 2020, he released a reworked version of Ultra Flava by Heller & Farley Project on Defected Records.

In November 2020, David Penn released a remix of "Finally Ready" by The Shapeshifters on Defected Records. David Penn was ranked #10 at the "Top Artists Of 2020" by Traxsource.

== Discography ==
=== Singles ===
- 2004 "Every Night & Every Day"
- 2005 "Esperanza" (with DJ Chus)
- 2008 "We Play House Music" (with DJ Chus)
- 2012 "Join Us" (with Lisa Millet)
- 2017 "Yeah Yeah"
- 2018 "Losing You"
- 2018 "Nobody"
- 2018 "Dynamite" (with ATFC)
- 2019 "Rollerball"
- 2020 David Penn vs Roland Clark - "The Power"
- 2020 David Penn & KPD - "Ain't Got No"
- 2020 David Penn - "The Heat"
- 2021 David Penn featuring Ramona Renea - "Lift Your Hands Up"

=== Remixes ===
- 2011 Copyright feat. Imaani - Story Of My Life (DJ Chus & David Penn Remix)
- 2016 YASS - Get Some (David Penn Remix)
- 2017 HAJI & EMANUEL - Weekend (David Penn Remix)
- 2017 YASS - Been a long time - (David Penn Remix)
- 2018 Todd Terry, Gypsymen - Babarabatiri (David Penn Remix)
- 2019 Pete Heller - Big Love (David Penn Remix)
- 2020 Heller & Farley Project - Ultra Flava (David Penn Extended Remix)
- 2020 Sneaky Sound System - Can't Help The Way That I Feel (David Penn Remix)
- 2020 Blue Boy - Remember Me (David Penn Remix)
- 2020 Mistura, Angela Johnson - Do You Love Me (David Penn Remix)
- 2020 The Goodfellas, David Penn - Soul Heaven (David Penn Remix)
- 2020 Double Dee, Dany - Found Love (David Penn Remix)
- 2020 The Shapeshifters featuring Billy Porter - Finally Ready (David Penn Extended Remix)
- 2021 Idris Elba & Inner City ft. Steffanie Christi'an - No More Looking Back (David Penn Extended Remix)
- 2022 Technasia & Green Velvet - Suga (David Penn Remix)
