= I'm Alive (Stretch & Vern song) =

1996 single by Stretch 'n' Vern

Single by Stretch & Vern present "Maddog"
- B-side: "Remixes"
- Released: 2 September 1996
- Genre: Disco; house
- Length: 3:07
- Label: FFRR; London
- Songwriters: Allee Willis; Jon Lind; Julian Peake; Stuart Silvester; Schluermann
- Producers: Stretch Silvester; Jules Vern

Stretch & Vern singles chronology
| "I'm Alive" (1996) | "Get Up! Go Insane!" (1997) |

Music video
- "I'm Alive" on YouTube

"I'm Alive" is a song by London-based DJ/producers Stretch Silvester (Stuart Silvester) and Jules Vern (Julian Peake) under the name Stretch & Vern, released as their debut single on 2 September 1996. Containing a looped sample from "Boogie Wonderland" by Earth, Wind & Fire, it was well received by music critics, peaking at number six on the UK Singles Chart and number-one on the UK Dance Chart. Released by FFRR and London Records, it was also featured on Coca-Cola advert campaigns. In other European countries, the song peaked at number 21 in Ireland, number 23 in the Netherlands and number 29 in Sweden, where it also topped the Swedish Dance chart. Outside Europe, the single peaked at number two on the Billboard Hot Dance Club Play chart in the US and at number 65 in Australia. The accompanying black-and-white music video was directed by Katya Nelhams-Wright and featuring an early appearance of actress Jaime Murray. British electronic dance and clubbing magazine Mixmag ranked "I'm Alive" number 28 in its list of the best singles of 1996.

== Critical reception ==
Larry Flick from Billboard magazine described the song as a "quirky dance twirler" and explained further that "this track is rife with the kitschy allure of a novelty hit", and "fashion a jittery disco beat beneath a tongue-twisting female rap." David Bennun from The Guardian complimented it as "gleefully manic" and "brilliant". Kevin Courtney from Irish Times wrote, "With summer coming to an end and autumn looming large, mankind has been preoccupied with one burning question: what are we going to dance to instead of 'Macarena'? This latest contender for the Wallypop crown has been packing; dancefloors across the UK, but sorry, it's just not silly enough; to succeed Los Del Rios." A reviewer from Music Week declared it as "alarmingly infectious".

Tim Jeffery from the Record Mirror Dance Update gave it a score of four out of five, adding, "This is so certain to be a huge hit that you probably wouldn't even get odds at Ladbrokes on it. It's a similar idea to the Bucketheads in that it's basically a disco pastiche made up of other people's records, particularly the large chunks of 'Boogie Wonderland', but it's the way this has been put together that's so special. Just try not dancing to this. Already snapped up by a major, copies on this label will be hard to find until it gets a proper release but you're certain to hear this everywhere you go." Another RM editor, James Hyman, noted its "I'm alive, the man with the second face and I'm ready y'all to rock the space" hook, and concluded that the song "has already caused club carnage and will do the same in the national charts."

== Track listing ==
- 7", UK (1996)

A. "I'm Alive" (Eat Me Edit) — 3:08
B. "I'm Alive" (Eat Me Edit) — 3:08

- 12" single, UK (1996)

A1. "I'm Alive" (12" Original) — 7:20
B1. "I'm Alive" (Fat Boy Comes Alive) — 5:08
B2. "I'm Alive" (Moonmen Mix) — 9:12

- CD single, UK & Europe (1996)
1. "I'm Alive" (7" Eat Me Edit) — 3:06
2. "I'm Alive" (12" Original) — 7:16
3. "I'm Alive" (Fat Boy Comes Alive) — 5:05
4. "I'm Alive" (Moonmen Mix) — 9:08

== Charts ==
=== Weekly charts ===
| Chart (1996–1997) | Peak position |
|---|---|
| Australia (ARIA) | 65 |
| Belgium Dance (Ultratop) | 4 |
| Europe (Eurochart Hot 100) | 16 |
| Europe (European Dance Radio) | 24 |
| Ireland (IRMA) | 21 |
| Netherlands (Dutch Top 40) | 23 |
| Netherlands (Single Top 100) | 25 |
| Scotland (OCC) | 12 |
| Sweden (Sverigetopplistan) | 29 |
| Sweden (Swedish Dance Chart) | 1 |
| UK Singles (OCC) | 6 |
| UK Dance (OCC) | 1 |
| UK Airplay (Music Week) | 20 |
| UK Club Chart (Music Week) | 2 |
| UK Pop Tip Club Chart (Music Week) | 8 |
| US Hot Dance Club Play (Billboard) | 2 |

=== Year-end charts ===
| Chart (1996) | Position |
|---|---|
| Sweden (Swedish Dance Chart) | 18 |
| UK Singles (OCC) | 75 |
| UK Club Chart (Music Week) | 27 |
