= Get Up! Go Insane! =

1997 single by Stretch 'n' Vern ft. Ithaka

Single by Stretch & Vern present "Maddog"
- B-side: "Remixes"
- Released: 27 July 1997
- Genre: Big beat; hip-hop; disco; house
- Length: 3:07
- Label: FFRR; London
- Songwriters: Julian Peake; Stuart Silvester; Ithaka Darin Pappas
- Producers: Stretch Silvester; Jules Vern

Stretch & Vern singles chronology
| "I'm Alive" (1996) | "Get Up! Go Insane!" (1997) | ""I Want You Remix"" (1998) |

Music video
- "Get Up! Go Insane!" on YouTube

"Get Up! Go Insane!" is a song by London-based DJ/producers Stretch Silvester (Stuart Silvester) and Jules Vern (Julian Peake) under the name Stretch & Vern and featuring Californian lyricist-vocalist Ithaka. The original 1997 version contained a looped sample from "Jump Around" by House of Pain, which was omitted in most of the subsequent mixes.

Released as Stretch & Vern's second single on 27 July 1997 by both FFRR and London Records. It was well received by music critics, in August of 1997 peaking at number seventeen on the UK Singles Chart and number-one on the UK Dance Chart. In Denmark, the song peaked at number fifteen on the national charts. The accompanying music video was directed by Eric Welch. Released by both FFRR and London Records, the song was also featured in a Samsung advert in South Korea featuring actress Jun Ji-hyun. The accompanying music video was directed by Eric Welch.

== Critical reception ==
Larry Flick from Billboard magazine said of the song, "sparkles with cross-over appeal, thanks to a credible beat, a glossy hook and smooth synths". The Brixton Buzz called it, a worldwide hit.

In 2020 retrospective article, the magazine 909 Originals described Get Up! Go Insane! as, "a pivotal record in the development of the big beat scene".

== DJ endorsements ==
On June 13, 1997, Fatboy Slim played the original mix of "Get up! Go Insane!" in Sweden during his set at Hultsfreds Hembygdspark to an audience of approximately 10,000. Fatboy eventually did two remixes of the song, one of them , entitled Fatboy Really Lost It Mix appeared on his own album, Fatboy's Greatest Remixes

On July 12, 1997, just weeks before the official release, German DJ Westbam played "Get Up! Go Insane!" at Love Parade to an audience of more than 1,000,000 people.

== Samsung My Jet Printer commercial ==
In 1999, Samsung in South Korea featured "Get Up! Go Insane!" in a national My Jet printer ad series featuring actress Jun Ji-Hyun. According to biographical sources, the commercial transformed Ji-Hyun into a teen idol in Korea. Today Jun Ji-Hyun is one of the most prominent celebrities in the entire country. The commercial, which was created by Cheil Worldwide an affiliate company of Samsung.

== 2019 reissue ==
In 2019, Stretch n Vern via London Records released a remastered special edition of Get Up! Go Insane! (both digitally and on 12" vinyl) including contemporary mixes from KDA, Plump DJs and K & K. The package also features two classic mixes from Fatboy Slim. These tracks, ‘Fatboy’s Disco Dub’ and ‘Fatboy’s Gone Insane’, mark the only occasion where Fatboy Slim has remixed the same artist on two separate instances. Although each mix showcases distinct styles, they both deliver high energy and embody that chaotic stadium sound that few, aside from Fatboy Slim, can achieve.

== Track listing ==
- CD single, US (1997) [FFRR, Spot On Recordings]
1. "Get Up! Go Insane!" (The Terrace Edit)
2. "Get Up! Go Insane!" (Fatboy Really Lost It)
3. "Get Up! Go Insane!" (Disco Dub)
4. "Get Up! Go Insane!" Moonmens Theme)
5. "Get Up! Go Insane!" (Rock 'N' Roll Mix)
- 12" vinyl, Italy (1997) [Bull & Butcher Recordings]
1. "Get Up! Go Insane!" (Rock'n'Roll Mix) — 6:39
2. "Get Up! Go Insane!" (Disco Dub Katz Mix) — 6:26
3. "Get Up! Go Insane!" (Fatboy Really Lost It) — 7:17
4. "Get Up! Go Insane!" (Moonmens Theme) — 11:38
- CD single maxi-single, Thailand (1997) [Avex Asia Limited]
1. "Get Up! Go Insane!" (The Terrace Edit) — 3:48
2. "Get Up! Go Insane!" (Fatboy Really Lost It) — 7:17
3. "Get Up! Go Insane!" (Disco Dub) — 6:34
4. "Get Up! Go Insane!" (Moonmens Theme) — 11:34
5. "Get Up! Go Insane!" (Rock'n'Roll Mix) —
6. "I'm Alive" (7" Eat Me Edit) — 3:06
7. "I'm Alive" (12" Original) — 7:16
8. "I'm Alive" (Fat Boy Comes Alive) —
9. "I'm Alive" (Moonmen Mix) — 9:10

== Charts ==
=== Weekly charts ===
| Chart (1996–1997) | Peak position |
|---|---|
| Denmark (ARIA) | 15 |
| UK Dance (OCC) | 1 |
| UK Singles (OCC) | 17 |
| US Hot Dance Club Play (Billboard) | 38 |

=== Year-end charts ===
| Chart (1997) | Position |
|---|---|
| UK Club Chart | 67 |
