= So Get Up (Underground Sound of Lisbon song) =

1994 single by Underground Sound of Lisbon featuring Ithaka

Single by Underground Sound of Lisbon featuring Ithaka)
- Released: 19 January 1994
- Studio: 1 Só Céu Cascais, Portugal
- Genre: house; Progressive house; Tribal house; Spoken word
- Length: 9:20
- Label: Kaos Records (Portugal)/Vidisco; Tribal America / I.R.S. Records/EMI Records*; Twisted Records; Absolutely Records (Italy); Forensic Records (UK)
- Songwriters: Rui Jorge Martins Pacheco da Silva; António Manuel Portela Alves Pereira; Ithaka Darin Pappas
- Producers: DJ Vibe; Rui da Silva

Underground Sound of Lisbon singles chronology
"Dance With Me" (1993)	"So Get Up" (1994)	"Are You Looking For Me" (1997)

Music video
- "So Get Up" on YouTube

"So Get Up" is a song by Portuguese electronic music duo Underground Sound of Lisbon featuring Greek-American lyricist-vocalist Ithaka, (including its subsequent nineteen officially-sanctioned versions and remixes).

== Creation ==
The original, non-vocal, unreleased version of the song by Underground Sound of Lisbon (DJ Vibe and Rui da Silva) was entitled, "303", in reference to the Roland TB-303, an analog bass synthesizer that much of the instrumental was created on. However, after inviting writer/vocalist Ithaka Darin Pappas, to record one of his existing vocal-poems over the track, the title was changed to simply "Get Up" to reflect the lyrics for an initial run of white-label vinyls and its B-side appearance on USL's December 1993 single release of "Dance With Me" in Portugal. The following year it was rebranded as So Get Up coinciding with its international releases.

USL members Rui da Silva and DJ Vibe with So Get Up lyricist/vocalist Ithaka (center) at Estúdios 1 Só Céu - Cascais, Portugal, November 1993

Although the initial nine-minute, twenty-second progressive house version of "Get Up" obscurely appeared on the B-side of the "Chapter One" 12-inch vinyl single release of "Dance With Me, a handful of national DJs such as Luis Leite kept the song in heavy rotation ultimately transforming it into a major Portuguese dance music "national anthem", influencing a large populace of Portuguese youth to get interested in house music. And famous for Ithaka's shouting "The end of the earth is upon us. Pretty soon it'll all turn to dust, So Get Up!, forget the past, go outside and have a blast!"

== Junior Vasquez/The Sound Factory ==
In late 1993, the group sent copies of the white-label promo vinyl to acquaintances in metropolises around the world. Eventually a friend of DJ Vibe's was able to get one into the hands of DJ Junior Vasquez of the famed Manhattan, New York nightclub The Sound Factory. Vasquez played the song several times that same night he was handed the record, but refused to tell anyone who the music was by, and where he had gotten it. The song soon became Junior Vasquez' trademark theme song at the club and it created an element of hype and mystery around it. It was nearly ten months later, when Vasquez revealed the origins of the track, leading to contract offers from several international dance music labels. It was New York's Tribal America Records, backed by Miles Copeland III's I.R.S. Records who signed the song to an international licensing deal.

== International licensing ==
In 1994, the US and UK editions of the song (now called "So Get Up") had included remixes by Junior Vasquez and Danny Tenaglia as well as the original mix and two different edits of the a cappella itself. This first international edition sold approximately 80,000 copies, with over a million copies of the song sold between 1994 and 1995 via the approximately 45 international compilations it appeared on. It reaching the #1 ranking on specialized dance music charts around the world and ranked #7 on the UK Dance charts in August 1994.

In 1995, "So Get Up" (Junior's Factory Mix) appeared on the compilation Cream Live (mixed by Graeme Park (DJ), Pete Tong, Paul Oakenfold and Justin Robertson) released by Deconstruction Records. The double-album peaked at the #2 spot on the UK's Top Compilations charts in June 1995. The song appearing on a UK compilation that sold upwards of a hundred-thousand units aided in solidifying the song's presence in Europe.

In following years, additional official remixes were created by international producers such as Turkey's Mert Yücel, and Eric Kupper from the U.S., and released by Kaos Records (Portugal), Twisted Records (USA), Absolutely Records (Italy), Forensic Records (UK). There were additionally hundreds of unauthorized bootlegs appearing across a multitude of dance music genres.

== Reception ==
=== Portugal ===
Although two fundamental components of the song (both lyrics and vocals) were created by a Greek-American temporarily residing in Portugal, the song was largely presented, both nationally internationally, as a 100% Portuguese, homegrown creation. The song became a dance music anthem within Portugal's electronic music scene. And the nightclubs and raves of US, UK and beyond soon followed. Público (Portugal) stated that, So Get Up was the catalyst of the dance music movement in Portugal. Blitz Magazine called the song, "A big success". And in 2017, more than two decades after its release the newspaper Diário de Notícias still considered it, "One of the biggest hits in Portuguese dance music'.

=== International ===
In 2015, Huffpost has called, "So Get Up" a world-wide House phenomenon.

Resident Advisor news has described "So Get Up" as one of the era's most enduring tracks.

DJ Mag has called the song, a bonafide progressive classic.

In the electronic music documentary, Paraíso, Danny Tenaglia describes the first time he heard the original USL ft. Ithaka mix of So Get Up in late 1993. (Note: He later went on to be one of the tune's foremost remixers). "I remember hearing it and thinking that is was really dark and it stuck out because it didn't have the hi-hats and all the sampling. It wasn't House, it wasn't Bonzai Techno. It was leaning more Progressive, but it wasn't even Tribal, there wasn't a lot of percussion to it. But the way it was building, and of course the story, The end of the earth, it gets your attention. You just get sucked into it".

In 2018, British music historian and author Bill Brewster said of Ithaka's vocals on So Get Up, one of the most iconic voices in house music.

In 2025, music journalist, Paulo André Cecílio of SIC Notícias stated (of Ithaka's So Get Up vocal-lyric) "Forget the past, go outside, have a blast" are words that, at a certain point during the 90s, had as much impact around the world as Timothy Leary's famous expression: "Turn on, tune in, drop out."

Renowned Scottish DJ, producer and label owner Kevin McKay describing Danny Tenaglia's In The Light We Sleep Mix of So Get Up, "This was the song everyone was talking about. The minute the voice comes out of this record, The end of the earth is upon us, everyone on the dance floor was like, What the fuck is this? And then the beats and the grooves and the acid and the analog that followed. The whole place went absolutely crazy".

== DJ endorsements ==
Throughout the decades, the official musical versions of "So Get Up" have been supported by several top global DJs including; Joris Voorn, John Creamer, Deep Dish and others.

== So Get Up at Rock in Rio ==
On June 1, 2014, Underground Sound of Lisbon reunited for a headlining performance at the Lisbon edition of Rock in Rio. So Get Up was the encore of their set.

== Paraíso (2025 documentary) ==
In 2025, “So Get Up” by Underground Sound of Lisbon featuring Ithaka, was featured in Paraíso, an award-winning documentary directed by Daniel Mota about rave culture and the history of electronic music in Portugal. The film explores, among other subjects, how “So Get Up” helped bring Portuguese dance music to greater international prominence. Featuring leading DJs including Yen Sung and Carlos Fauvrelle, Paraíso received both the Best Documentary Award and the FILMin Audience Choice Award at the 2025 Caminhos do Cinema Português festival in Coimbra. It was also included in the Official Selection of the 2025 Melkweg festival in Amsterdam.

== Track listing (including official mixes) ==
=== 1994 ===
- Chapter One - Vinyl, 12", 33 ⅓ RPM (1993) [Kaos Records, Portugal]
1. "Dance With Me"
2. "Get Up" [ISRC# PTVI10400011]

=== 1995 ===
- So Get Up - 2 x Vinyl, 12", 33 ⅓ RPM (1994) [TRIBAL America]
1. So Get Up (Original Mix) — 9:20 [ISRC# PTVI19701426]
2. So Get Up (Acapella) — 1:08 [ISRC# PTVI19701426]
3. So Get Up (Junior's Factory Mix) — 5:23 [ISRC# PTVI10400012]
4. So Get Up (Factory Dub) — 11:38
5. So Get Up (Danny's "In The Light We Sleep" Mix) — 10:10 [ISRC# PTVI10400013]
6. So Get Up (Get-Upella) — 1:25 [ISRC# PTVI19500866]
7. So Get Up (The "It's 4 P.M. Danny, Get Up!" Dub) — 5:55
8. Dance With Me (Original Mix) — 7:39

=== 2002 ===
- So Get Up 2002 - Vinyl, 12" (2007) [Absolutely, Italy]
1. So Get Up 2002 (Eric Kupper's Tribalectro Mix) — 8:45 [ISRC# PTVI10400015]
2. So Get Up 2002 (Dan Robbins Three Dimension Mix) — 13:09 [ISRC# PTVI10400018]
3. So Get Up 2002 (Low End Specialists Mix) — 6:16 [ISRC# PTVI10100310]
4. So Get Up 2002 (Mert Yücel's DeepXperience Mix) 7:03 [ISRC# PTVI10400017]

=== 2007 ===
- So Get Up - 2 x File, MP3, 320 kbit/s (2007) [Forensic Records, UK]
1. So Get Up (Mirabeau Remix) — 8:43
2. So Get Up (Damaged People Remix) — 7:14

=== 2007 ===
- So Get Up - Vinyl, 12" (2007) [Kaos Records, Portugal]
1. So Get Up (Shuffling Phunk Investigation Mix) — 7:37
2. So Get Up (Phunk Investigation Turbolento Mix) — 7:39
3. So Get Up (Phunk Investigation 'O' Tech Mix) — 8:45
4. So Get Up (Next Life Mowree Rmx) — 6:49

=== 2014 ===
- Adam Freemer – Twisted Class - X - 5 x File, WAV (2014) [Twisted Records, USA]
1. So Get Up (Adam Freemer Rm-X) — 8:15

=== 2015 ===
- So Get Up (Pagano Mixes) 12" Vinyl (2015) [Tribal Records, USA]
1. So Get Up Pagano 2015 Mix — 7:57
2. So Get Up Pagano 2015 Dub — 7:43

== Charts ==
Chart (1994)	Peak position
UK Dance (OCC)	7

== Publishing ==
"So Get Up" by Underground Sound of Lisbon featuring Ithaka is published by Sociedade Portuguesa de Autores, Rossio Music (Portugal), Notting Hill Music (UK), Ravenshark Music/North Music Group, BMG Gold Songs, and American Society of Composers, Authors and Publishers.
