= Mert Yücel =

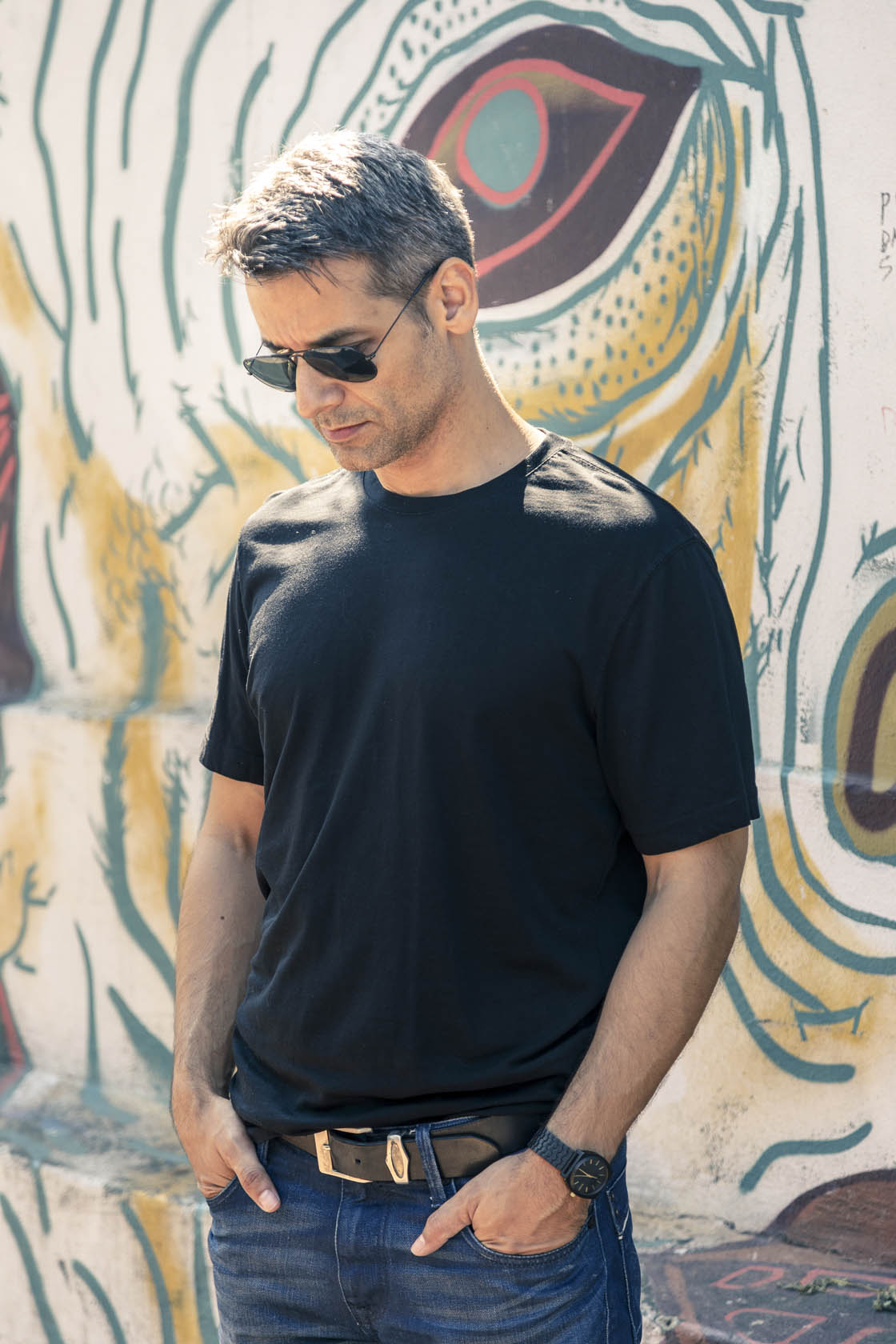

Background information
- Also known as: Silentrunner
- Born: Mert Yücel
- Genres: House, Tech House
- Occupations: Producer, DJ
- Years active: 1999-present
- Labels: Subversive Records; Maya Records; Artform Records; Baroque Records; DeepXperience Productions; Maya Records; Dutchie Music; Dusk Recordings; Nascent Recordings; Swift Recordings; East'n Soul Recordings
- Website: http://www.mertyucel.com/

Mert Yücel is a Turkish electronic music producer from Istanbul. At the age of 22, Yücel produced the first house music album released in Turkey. He his career singles have included; "Dreamer", released on US and UK labels including Baroque Records, Subversive Records, and Choo Choo Records. Yücel released a 2002 remix of "So Get Up" by Underground Sound of Lisbon featuring Ithaka (aka Ithaka Darin Pappas) for (Kaos Records/Tribal America). In 2007, he collaborated with Ithaka on another release entitled "Evolution" for Wiggle Records.

He has released more than 54 singles on various UK and US labels.

Yücel also runs the record label DeepXperience Productions, which he founded in 2005. The label is mainly focused on house, deep-house, tech-house and their derivatives. The label has released singles from Jamie Anderson, Joeski, Mieka Du Franx, Tyler Stadius, Tyler Lewis, Murray Richardson, C-Soul, Gideon Jackson, Alex Celler, and Dave Mothersole.

Yücel is also host of a radio show on Radio FG 93.7 FM.
