= Stretch & Vern =

English electronic music duo

- Origin: London, England
- Genres: Electronic, house
- Years active: 1993–present
- Labels: FFRR; London; Spot On Records; Mono-Type Records; VC Recordings
- Members: Stretch Silvester; Jules Vern

Stretch & Vern are an English electronic music duo consisting of Stretch Silvester (Stuart Collins) and Jules Vern (Julian Peake).

== Biography ==
They are best known for the 1996 hit "I'm Alive", which prominently samples "Boogie Wonderland" by Earth, Wind & Fire.

"I'm Alive" was a huge success, reaching No. 6 on the UK Singles Chart, No. 2 on the US Billboard Hot Dance Club Play chart and No. 1 on the Swedish and UK Dance charts. The song gained popularity again in 2019 after a re-release of new mixes by Illyus & Barrientos, Prins Thomas and Wax Worx.

Their second single, "Get Up! Go Insane!", features Californian lyricist and vocalist Ithaka (Escape From The City Of Angels). The song which also includes a sample of House of Pain's "Jump Around", reached number 17 on the UK Singles Chart as well as also reaching number one on the UK Dance Singles Chart in 1997.

== Discography ==
=== Singles ===
List of singles, with selected chart positions
Title	Year	Peak chart positions				
Title	Year	UK	AUS	FIN	NLD	SWE
"I'm Alive" (present "Maddog")	1996	6	65	—	25	29
“Get Up! Go Insane!” (present "Maddog")	1997	17	—	15	—	—
