= Rui da Silva (DJ) =

Portuguese DJ (born 1968)

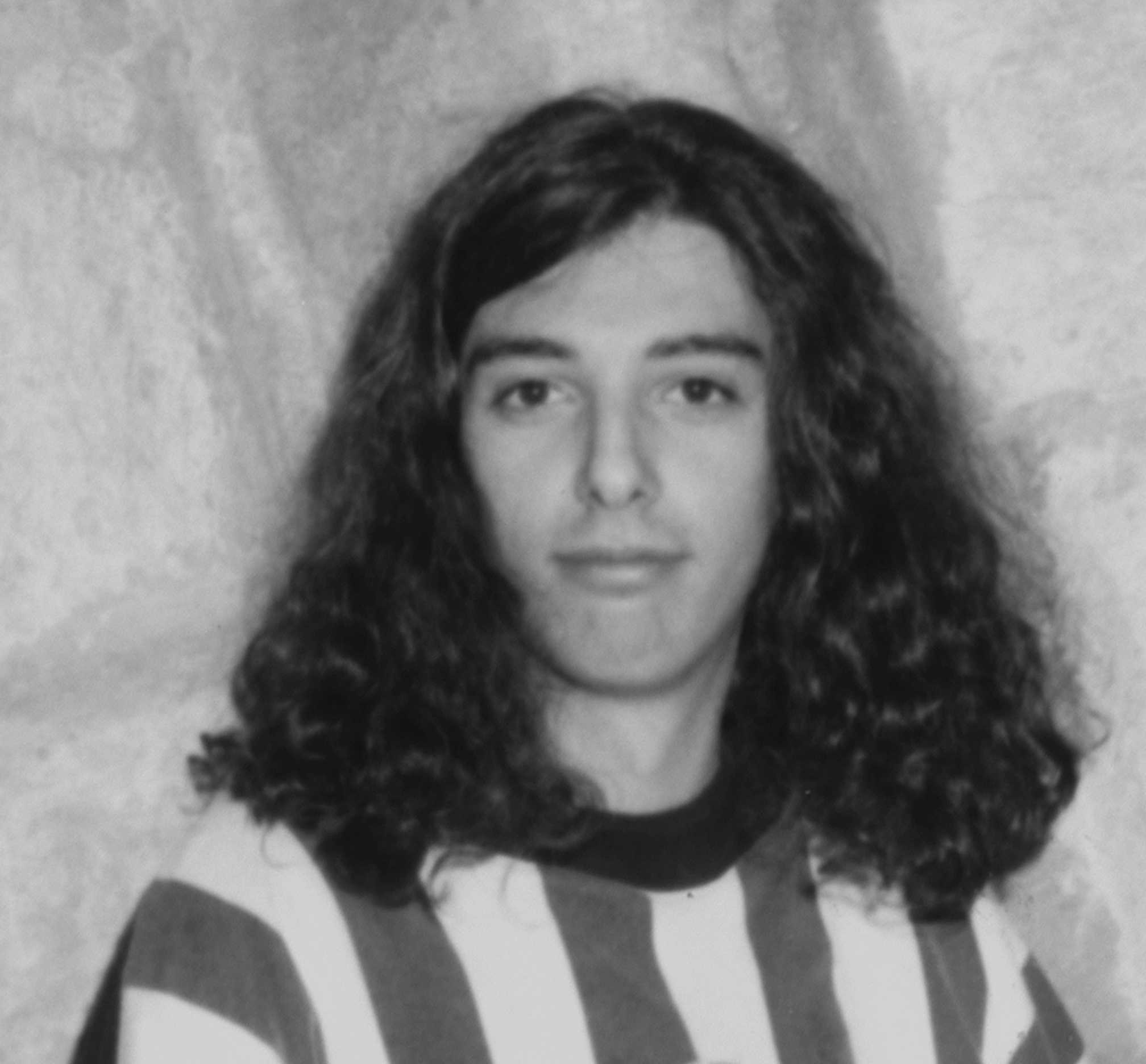
- Silva in 1994

Background information
- Also known as: Doctor J
- Born: 25 April 1968 (age 58)
- Origin: Lisbon, Portugal
- Genre: House
- Occupations: Record producer, dj
- Years active: 1992–present
- Labels: Kismet Records, Sixty Four Records
- Website: kismetrecords.com

Rui da Silva (born 25 April 1968) is a Portuguese producer and DJ, whose single "Touch Me" topped the Portuguese Singles Chart. Outside Portugal, "Touch Me" also topped the charts in the United Kingdom, where it became the first progressive house song to top the UK Singles Chart, the first song by a Portuguese act to top the chart.

== Career ==
Silva started producing house music in 1992, just as club culture was getting established in Lisbon. Noticing the lack of dance music labels in Portugal, he teamed up with DJ Vibe to form Kaos Records, the first label in Portugal specialized in house and electronic music.

His first major hit (and Kaos' first release) was "Não", a track that sampled vocals from a Xutos & Pontapés track, released under the alias Doctor J. With DJ Vibe, he also formed the Underground Sound of Lisbon project in 1993. A year later, their track "So Get Up" (which features an original spoken-word poem by Californian songwriter Ithaka (Ithaka Darin Pappas) achieved worldwide fame after getting picked by the Tribal America label and support from Danny Tenaglia. Tenaglia also remixed the track.

During his years at Kaos, Silva also worked with other artists, namely Luís Leite (under the guise of LL Project, creating the song "Khine #3") and Alex Santos (with whom he released the garage house track "The Sax Theme").

In 1999, he left Lisbon for London, to move from producing to DJing, and also to start working under his own name. Silva left Kaos Records, and produced his final collaborative effort as Underground Sound of Lisbon in 2001. In the UK, he founded Kismet Records, where he began producing a more progressive sound. He has released a number of tracks under his own name, as well as collaborative efforts with Chris Coco and Moshic.

Silva has achieved some fame as a remixer, creating his own versions of Jennifer Lopez's "Play", Lighthouse Family's "Happy" and Yoko Ono's "Walking on Thin Ice".

== Discography ==
see Underground Sound of Lisbon for the rest of Rui da Silva's discography

=== Albums ===
- Produced & Remixed (2002)
- Praying Mantis (2006)

=== Singles ===
==== Rui da Silva ====
- "Touch Me" with Cassandra Fox (2000)
- "Fire/Earth" (Kismet Records, 2001)
- "Feel the Love" (with Victoria Horn (2002)
- "Pacman/Punks Run Wild" (64 Records, 2004)
- "So Move Closer" (2005)
- "Dance.Come.Feel.Exe" (2005)
- "Lixuneanos" (2005)
- "Amidar" (2006)
- "Spreading Isolation/The Regressors" (2007)
- "The Whole Room Dematerialized" (2007)
- "Escaping My Mind" (2007)
- "On My Mind" (with Ben Onono (2008)
- "Crazy Love" with Dada featuring One (Destined Records, 2011)

==== Doctor J ====
- "Não" (1993)
- "The Sax Theme" with Alex Santos (1994)
- "Human Soul", as Doctor J Presents Mata Hari (1995)

==== The Four Elements ====
- "Earth/Water" (2000)
- "Fire" (2002)
- "The Fifth Element" (2002)
- "Matrix/Stoned" (2003)

==== Coco da Silva ====
All are collaborations with Chris Coco

- "Coisa Nossa/Close My Eyes" (2000)
- "Lost" (2001)
- "@ Night" (2001)
- "Saudade" (Kismet Records, 2002)
- "This Time You're Mine" (2002)
- "The Shiva Chant" (2003)
- "Don't Say Nothing (Say Something)" (2011)

==== Other aliases ====
- "So Get Up", as Underground Sound of Lisbon (1993)
- "Work in Progress", as LL Project with Luís Leite (1995)
- "Khine No. 3 (The Remixes)", as LL Project with Luís Leite (1996)
- "Fat Beat/Bossa Nova", as Gum Club (1996)
- "Matrix", as Morpheus (1999)
- "Obeah Dance", as The Obeah Men with Terry Farley (2001)
- "Riding", as Teimoso with Shelly Preston (2001)
- "Radar House", as Hyper da Silva with DJ Hyper (2003)
- "Deep as the Rivers", as Moshic da Silva with Moshic (2003)
- "Gibberish", as Moshic da Silva (with Moshic (2003)
- "Cosmic Mind", as Sound Projectors (2003)
- "Dark Love, as The Downloaderz (2004)
