= DJ Chus =

Spanish musician (born 1971)

- Birth name: Jesus Lopez Esteban
- Also known as: DJ Chus
- Born: 1971 (age 53–54); Madrid, Spain
- Genres: House
- Occupation(s): Producer, DJ
- Years active: 1994–present
- Labels: Stereo Productions
- Website: http://www.djchus.com/

DJ Chus (born Jesús López Esteban, 1971 in Madrid, Spain) is a Spanish electronic music producer, remixer and DJ. He works mainly in house music.

== Biography ==
Chus began DJing at the age of 16. In 1994, he opened Teatro Kapital, and was also one of the residents in Algarve's Kadoc disco.

After years of producing house and trance music under a variety of names, DJ Chus, along with fellow DJ and producer Pablo Ceballos and manager Carlos Caliço, founded the Stereo Productions record label in 2001. DJ Chus usually collaborates with Pablo Ceballos on progressive house releases, and with David Penn on garage house tracks.

== Discography ==
=== Singles ===
==== DJ Chus ====
- 1994: "Kapital of House"
- 1996: "Come into the House"
- 1997: "Get Funky", with David Penn and Beto Cerutti
- 2005: "World Routes"
- 2006: "Black Rain"

==== Chus & Ceballos ====
Collaborations with Pablo Ceballos:

- 2001: "Afrika"
- 2002: "Iberican Grooves Vol. 1"
- 2002: "Deep Architecture", as Dano, Chus & Ceballos, with Dano
- 2002: "Iberican Sound"
- 2002: "The Strong Rhythm", as Manaça, Chus & Ceballos, with Carlos Manaça
- 2002: "On the Strength", as Chus & Ceballos vs. Tony Hewitt, with Tony Hewitt
- 2003: "Echoes from Doruma"
- 2004: "In Stereo", as Chus & Ceballos vs. Tedd Patterson, with Tedd Patterson
- 2004: "Low Frequencies", as Chus & Ceballos vs. Richie Santana, with Richie Santana
- 2005: "Iberican Sound (2005 Remixes)"
- 2005: "Wrong About Me", with Derek Conyer
- 2009: "Blended Sound 002: (Part 1)"
- 2010: "One Night in Havana" with Gonzalez & Gonzalo
- 2013: "Xango" with Rafa Barrios
- 2014: "La Colombiana"
- 2015: "They Say Nothing"
- 2015: "Black Rock City"
- 2015: "Abisinia" with Leonardo Gonelli ft GiGi
- 2015: "Check Tech" with Rafa Barrios
- 2016: "Twisted Comes" with Adrian Hour
- 2016: "Pussy Cat" with Tini Garcia
- 2017: "Now or Never" with Rafa Barrios Ft. Cari Golden
- 2018: Fiezzta EP with Oscar L
- 2018: "More I Want U"
- 2018: "Down for It" with Danny Serrano, Solo Tamas
- 2018: "Sostenido", with Oscar L
- 2018: "The Sun", with Dennis Cruz

==== DJ Chus & David Penn/Chus+Penn ====
Collaborations with David Penn:

- 2000: "Sunshine", with Darren J. Bell
- 2001: "From Madrid with Love"
- 2001: "Music for Playgrounds", as Halo, Penn & Chus, with Halo
- 2002: "Baila", with Caterina de Jesus
- 2002: "Burning Paris"
- 2004: "Esperanza"
- 2004: "Sunshine 2004", with Darren J. Bell
- 2004: "Will I (Discover Love)", with Concha Buika

==== Hannu ====
- 2003: "Latina"
- 2004: "Into the Night"
- 2004: "Summerfunk"

==== Polaris ====
Collaborations with Beto Cerutti:

- 1997: "Polaris"
- 1998: "The Next Millennium"
- 2000: "Give Me Your Hand"

==== Latin Lovers ====
Collaborations with Beto Cerutti:

- 2000: "Voices of Savanna"
- 2003: "Dos Gardenias (Para Ti)"
- 2004: "Cuando El Amor"

==== Other aliases ====
- 1997: "Screaming Dolphins", as Kenya, with Beto Cerutti
- 1997: "Le Plaisir", as Nitro, with Beto Cerutti
- 1998: "Atmosphere", as Nitro, with Beto Cerutti
- 1998: "Are You Ready to Honk the Airhorns?", as Roundheadz, with Beto Cerutti
- 1998: "Bahia's Children", as Cerutti & Lopez, with Beto Cerutti
- 2001: "El Amor", as Joeski & Chus, with Joeski and Caterina de Jesus
- 2001: The Roma EP, as DJ Chus vs. Oscar de Rivera, with Oscar de Rivera
- 2002: "That Feeling", as The Groove Foundation, with Pablo Ceballos and Darren J. Bell - UK #65
- 2003: "We Play House", as Soulground, with David Penn and Concha Buika
- 2005: "That Feeling (Bring It Back Again)", as The Groove Foundation, with Pablo Ceballos and Darren J. Bell
- 2006: "We Play House (Remixes)", as Soulground, with David Penn and Concha Buika
- 2006: "Superflyin'", as Cubic, with Pablo Ceballos and Victor Calderone

==== (Co-)productions for other artists ====
- 1995: Kadoc - "The Nighttrain"
- 1995: Kadoc - The Return of the Dark Mask EP
- 2000: Tekknova - "Dancing in Outer Space", with David Castellano
- 2003: Marcelo Castelli - "Quimera", with Pablo Ceballos

== Awards ==
- Deejay Mags - Best House DJ 2001, 2004
- Deejay Mags - Best Spanish DJ 2004
- Deejay Mags - Best House Production 2002
- Dance Club Awards - Best Producer 2002, 2004
- Dance Club Awards - Best CD Compilation 2003
