= DJ Vibe =

Portuguese DJ (born c. 1967)

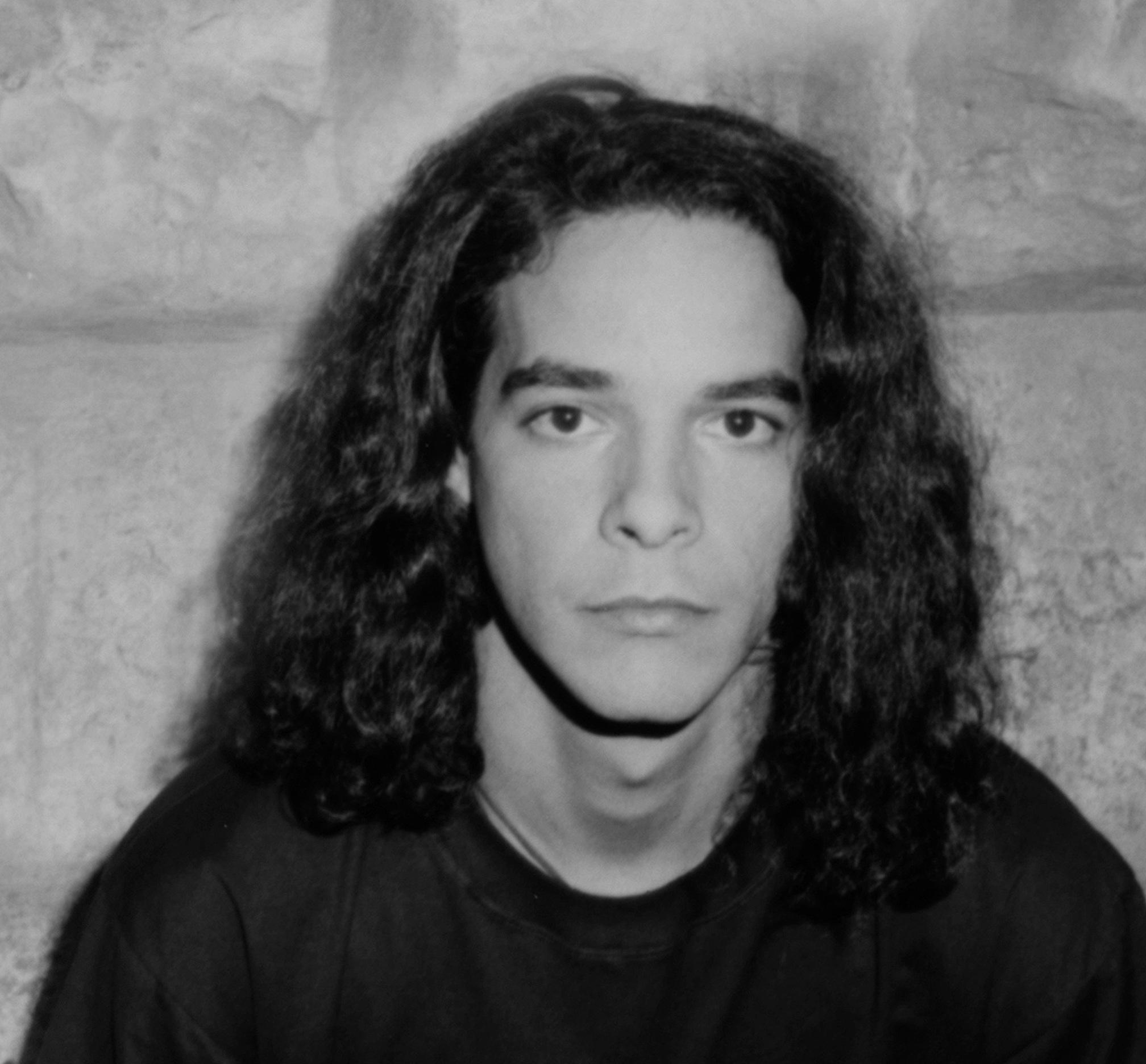
- DJ Vibe in 1994

Background information
- Also known as: DJ Vibe; Tó
- Born: António Manuel Portela Alves Pereira; 1968 (age 57–58); Lisbon, Portugal
- Genre: House
- Occupations: Producer, DJ
- Years active: 1992–present
- Label: Kaos Records
- Formerly of: Underground Sound of Lisbon, Sonic Hunters, Meco
- Website: soundcloud.com/dj-vibe-official

António Manuel "Tó" Portela Alves Pereira (born 1968), known by his stage name DJ Vibe, is a Portuguese house DJ.

== Career ==
Vibe was born in Lisbon, Portugal, and became a DJ at 15. At this age he started to perform in clubs and before long he was playing side by side with big names of the dance scene like Paul Oakenfold, Tony Humphries, Roger Sanchez and Danny Tenaglia. However, it was his partnership with another Portuguese, Rui da Silva, that propelled him to the top of the house music scene, both nationally and internationally. Together, with Da Silva, he brought life to the project, Underground Sound of Lisbon, which in the summer of 1994 released the hit "So Get Up" (featuring vocals and lyrics by Californian artist/songwriter, Ithaka (Ithaka Darin Pappas) distributed by Rob di Stefano's label, Tribal USA, reaching #1 on the Billboard Club Chart. He has done an extensive number of remixes for DJ Jiggy, Danny Tenaglia, Kristine W and others.

In addition to DJing, Vibe co-owns Kaos Records, a record store and label in Lisbon, which he founded in 1992 with entrepreneur António Cunha. Vibe has mixed a variety of compilations for Kaos Records, most notably Global Grooves. He was also involved in other projects such as LHT, NYLX, Sonic Hunters and Meco.

== Discography ==
See Underground Sound of Lisbon for the rest of DJ Vibe's discography

=== DJ Vibe ===
- 1994 "Unreleased Project", with Tó Ricciardi
- 2003 "Solid Textures", with Pete Tha Zouk
- 2004 "I'll Take You", with Franklin Fuentes
- 2007 "Tranzient/Da Muzik", as Calderone & Vibe, with Victor Calderone
- 2007 You (DJ Vibe & Ithaka song)

=== Other aliases ===
- 1999 "Meco EP", as Meco
- 2000 "The Driver", as Meco
- 2005 "Re-Evolution", as Sonic Hunters, with Tó Ricciardi
- 2006 "Mosquito Pollen/El Ayoun", as Casa Grande

=== Remixes ===
- Yoko Ono "Everyman… Everywoman…" (2004)

=== Premiums ===
- 1999 reach #1 ranking World's Best DJ's
