= Sociedade Portuguesa de Autores =

The Sociedade Portuguesa de Autores (or SPA) translated as Portuguese Society of Authors is a limited liability cooperative, founded in Portugal in 1925 to manage copyrights.
