= Caminhos do Cinema Português =

The Caminhos do Cinema Português (Portuguese: Paths for Portuguese Cinema) is the only festival of exclusively Portuguese cinema, held in Portugal. It is a project of the "Centro de Estudos Cinematográficos" (Centre for Cinematographic Study) of the Associação Académica de Coimbra. It is considered the sixth film festival of Portugal, and one of the few festivals held outside the greater Lisbon and greater Porto areas. The festival takes place annually in November in the city of Coimbra and reached its nineteenth season as of 2012.

== Award Recipients by Year ==
=== 2015 ===
"Grande Prémio" Blood of My Blood directed by João Canijo

=== 2025 ===
- Grande Prémio "La Durmiente" directed by Maria Inês Gonçalves
- Best Documentary Paraíso" directed by Daniel Mota
- "FILMin Audience Choice Award" Paraíso" directed by Daniel Mota
