= Underground Sound of Lisbon =

Portuguese music duo

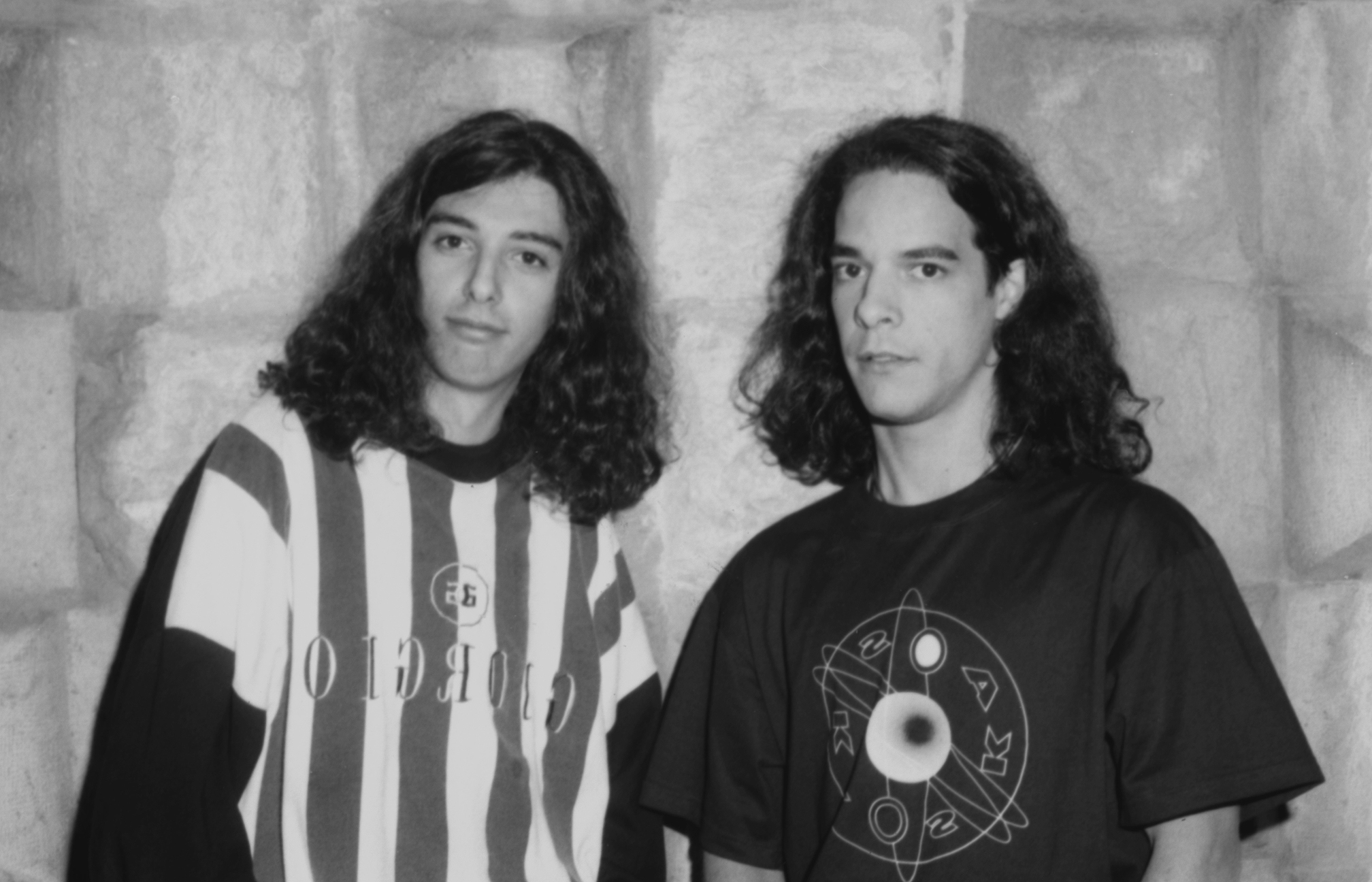
- U.S.L. in 1994

Background information
- Also known as: LHT
- Origin: Lisbon, Portugal
- Genre: House
- Years active: Since 1993
- Label: Kaos Records
- Past members: DJ Vibe; Rui da Silva

Underground Sound of Lisbon (sometimes shortened to USL) is a collaboration between Portuguese house music producers Rui da Silva (then known as Doctor J) and DJ Vibe (real name Tó Pereira), who were active between 1993 and 2001. In 2014, USL returned to the stage to perform at the Rock in Rio Lisboa Electronic Stage.

The duo started working together in 1993 by founding Kaos Records, the first Portuguese electronic music label, with promoter António Cunha. They released their first record as Underground Sound of Lisbon, Chapter One, in 1994, although at that time they also signed their production work as LHT (Lisbon Hard Team).

But the USL moniker prevailed, becoming much more internationally recognized after the track "So Get Up", a hard tribal anthem with spoken-word apocalyptic proclamations by Californian vocalist-lyricist Ithaka Darin Pappas (more often known simply as Ithaka), received airplay in New York clubs at the hands of DJ Junior Vasquez, which led to a worldwide release at the Tribal America label. They also produced a track with house diva Celeda on the vocals called "Are You Looking For Me".

In 1998, USL contributed "Hailwa Yenge Oike Mbela" to the AIDS benefit compilation album Onda Sonora: Red Hot + Lisbon produced by the Red Hot Organization.

By the late 1990s their tribal house sound morphed into a more progressive and dreamy vibe. After the release of their final album, Etnocity, the duo officially entered an indefinite hiatus, as both artists wanted to branch out into other fields and work with other producers. Da Silva relocated to London, where he set up Kismet Records and started touring the world, while Vibe continued to tour worldwide and began working with up-and-coming Portuguese producers.

== NYLX ==
NYLX was the name of a collaborative project between USL and Danny Tengalia. It was a one-track project released in 1997, the track being "Goosebumps". NYLX is the junction of NY (for New York City) and LX for Lisbon. The track uses a spoken vocal provided by Claudia Radbauer, also known as Lula (who has also provided some vocals for Club 69 or Sizequeen projects by Peter Rauhofer.)

Its Portuguese release on Kaos Records was a three-track 12-inch single: A. Goosebumps (The Kremlim Mix) B1. "Goosebumps" (The Portuguese Sound) B2 "Goosebumps" (Radio Edit). In the US, on Twisted Records (U.S.), it was released as a maxi-single CD that featured the Portuguese sound mix, the a cappella, called here "Lula-pella" and its signature remix-version, 15 minutes and 10 seconds long, by American producer Johnny Vicious: "The Mushroom Head Mix".

== Discography ==
=== Albums ===
- 1998 Early Years - The Singles Collection 1993-1998
- 2000 Etnocity

=== Singles ===
- 1993 "Chapter One"
- Dance With Me (Underground Sound of Lisbon song)
- 1994 "So Get Up" (lyrics/vocals Ithaka)
- 1997 "Chapter Two"
- 1997 "Goosebumps" (as NYLX, with Danny Tenaglia and Claudia Radbauer)
- 1998 "Are You Looking For Me" (with Celeda)
- 2000 "The Lights"
- 2000 "African Dreams" (with Filipe Mukenga)
- 2001 "Etnocity Album Sampler" (with Maria João & Mário Laginha)
- 2002 "So Get Up 2002" (lyrics/vocals by Ithaka)
- 2004 "So Get Up" 10th Anniversary Edition (lyrics/vocals by Ithaka), mixes by Junior Vasquez, Danny Tenaglia, Eric Kupper, Low End Specialists, Mert Yücel & Dan Robbins
- 2007 "So Get Up 2007" (lyrics/vocals by Ithaka)
