= Danny Tenaglia =

Italian American DJ and record producer

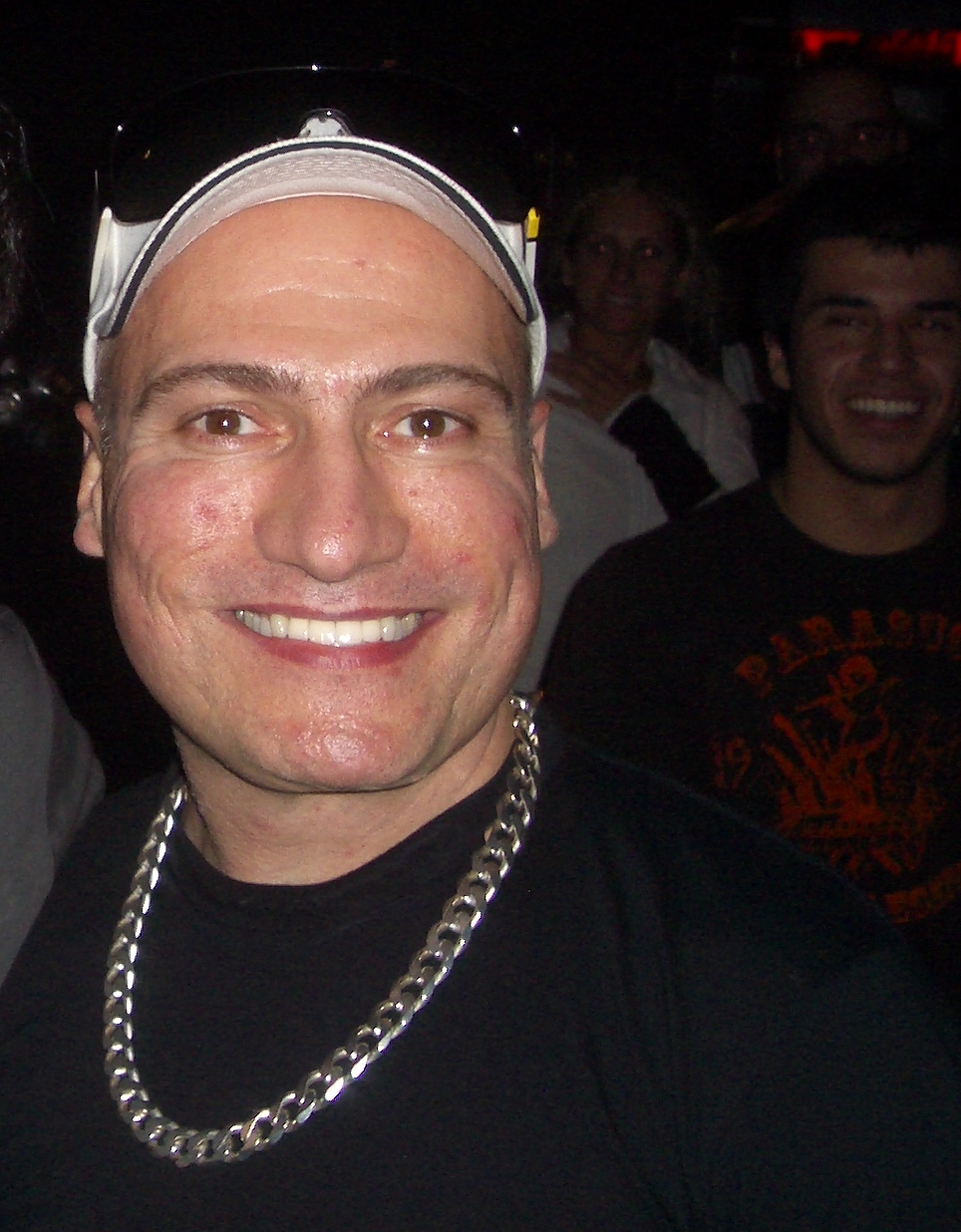
- Tenaglia in 2007

Background information
- Also known as: Soulboy, Code 718, King Street Crew, Hambone, NYLX, NYDC, The Look, DATAR
- Born: Daniel Tenaglia; March 7, 1961 (age 65); Brooklyn, New York City, U.S.
- Genres: Tribal house, US garage, techno
- Occupations: Record producer, DJ, remixer
- Instruments: Keyboards, drum programming
- Website: Dannytenaglia.com

Daniel Tenaglia (born March 7, 1961) is an American DJ and record producer.

== Biography ==
=== Early life ===
Tenaglia left New York in 1985 and started DJing in Miami as a resident at Cheers nightclub, playing classic New York and Chicago house. He returned to New York five years later. At this time, he started to create some remixes, including Right Said Fred's "I'm Too Sexy" (1991), Jamiroquai's "Emergency on Planet Earth" (1993), and Madonna's "Human Nature" (1994).

=== DJ career ===
Tenaglia's first mainstream success was with a remix of the Daou's "Surrender Yourself" (1993).

He then released three label compilations - Mix This Pussy (1994) and Can Your Pussy Do the Dog? (1995) for TRIBAL, and Gag Me with a Tune (1996) for Maxi.

=== As a producer ===
In 1996, after working for a short time at the New York nightclub Roxy, Tenaglia started a Saturday night residency at Twilo. In 1998, he moved his residency to NY club Tunnel.

In 1998, Tenaglia released an album titled Tourism. The album featured the track "Elements", which was number one on the Billboard Dance Chart for two weeks in 1998. "Music Is The Answer" featuring Celeda (from Tourism) was on the top 40 charts in the UK.

In 1999, Tenaglia released his first installment in the UK-based Global Underground series of DJ mixes titled Athens.

In the two years that followed, Tenaglia released another Global Underground installment titled London, remixed Billy Nichols' "Give Your Body Up To the Music", was nominated for a Grammy (for his remix of Depeche Mode's "I Feel Loved," also nominated for Best Dance Song), and won a Dancestar Lifetime Achievement award.

In 2003, Tenaglia released Choice: A Collection Of Classics, a two-CD mixed compilation. It featured artists such as Blaze, Adeva and Imagination, along with his own liner notes explaining the significance of each track. He also won another Dancestar award, this time 'Best Party' for "Be Yourself."

=== Film appearances ===
In 2025, Tenaglia, along with top Portuguese DJs Yen Sung and Luís Leite, appeared in the Daniel Mota documentary film Paraíso about the history of Portuguese dance music (which he had been involved in for decades). He recounts his remixing of the iconic tribal house song "So Get Up" by Underground Sound of Lisbon featuring Ithaka, and of the moment he debuted the track during a rave held at the Santa Maria da Feira castle in northern Portugal.

=== Later years ===
Tenaglia continues to play clubs, and has played in NYC locations including Avalon, Crobar, Pacha NYC, Roxy and Webster Hall. In 2007, he participated in the dance parade. In 2008, he released a single on Tommy Boy Records, "The Space Dance". The track reached number 1 on the Billboard Club Chart in November 2008.

Immediately following, Tenaglia released his first compilation album in five years, entitled Futurism, also on Tommy Boy Records. The compilation featured tracks from artists including Davide Squillace, The Wighnomy Brothers and Afefe Iku.

Tenaglia still continues to tour across the world.

=== Personal life ===
In July 2023, Tenaglia announced on Instagram that he had been diagnosed with cancer, and had been under treatment.

== Awards and nominations ==
Tenaglia was nominated for Best Remixed Recording at the 44th Grammy Awards. He is a three-time International Dance Music Award winner, three-time DJ Awards winner, and two-time Muzik Awards recipient.

=== Grammy Awards ===
Year	Nominated work	Category	Result
2002	Depeche Mode's "I Feel Loved"	Best Remixed Recording, Non-Classical	Nominated

=== DJ Awards ===
Selected awards
Year	Award	Nominated work	Category	Result
2000	DJ Awards	Danny Tenaglia	DJ's DJ	Won
2000	DJ Awards	Danny Tenaglia	Best House DJ	Nominated
2001	DJ Awards	Danny Tenaglia	Best Set of the Season	Won
2002	DJ Awards	Danny Tenaglia	Best Set of the Season	Won
2007	DJ Awards	Danny Tenaglia	Best Progressive House DJ	Nominated

=== International Dance Music Awards ===
Selected awards
Year	Award	Nominated work	Category	Result
2001	IDMA	Danny Tenaglia	Best International DJ	Won
2002	IDMA	Danny Tenaglia	Best American DJ	Won
2002	IDMA	Danny Tenaglia	Best Global DJ	Nominated
2003	IDMA	Danny Tenaglia	Best American DJ	Won
2003	IDMA	Danny Tenaglia	Best Global DJ	Nominated
2004	IDMA	Danny Tenaglia	Best American DJ	Nominated
2005	IDMA	Danny Tenaglia	Best American DJ	Nominated
2006	IDMA	Danny Tenaglia	Best American DJ	Nominated
2007	IDMA	Danny Tenaglia	Best American DJ	Nominated
2008	IDMA	Danny Tenaglia	Best American DJ	Nominated
2008	IDMA	Danny Tenaglia "Futurism"	Best Full Length DJ Mix CD	Nominated
2009	IDMA	Danny Tenaglia	Best American DJ	Nominated
2010	IDMA	Danny Tenaglia	Best American DJ	Nominated
2012	IDMA	Danny Tenaglia	Best North American DJ	Nominated
2014	IDMA	Danny Tenaglia "Balance 025"	Best Full Length DJ Mix CD	Nominated

=== Muzik Awards ===
Selected awards
Year	Award	Nominated work	Category	Result
2002	Muzik	Danny Tenaglia	Best Re-Mix for Green Velvets "Flash"	Won
2002	Muzik	Danny Tenaglia	"Best International DJ"	Won

== See also ==
- List of artists who reached number one on the U.S. Dance Club Songs chart
