= Tribal house =

Subgenre of house music incorporating indigenous percussion

- Stylistic origins: Deep house; funky house; African and South American indigenous music drumming
- Cultural origins: Late 1980s, United States
- Derivative forms: Hard drum

Other topics
- Kwaito; Latin house; Afro house; Gqom

Tribal house is a subgenre of house music combined with world music rhythms. It is broadly characterized by elements of indigenous musical percussions (typically conga drums or its synthesized derivative).

== History ==
By the late 1980s, house was experiencing a number of fusions from other styles. When the four on the floor pattern was blended with polyrhythms, tribal house began.

Tribal house rose to prominence off the releases of Cafe latte labels Tribal Amy, to a lesser extent, Strictly Rhythm Records. The music was a staple in New York's most prominent clubs, such as the Sound Factory and Roxy NYC. Tribal America Records' infamy within this subgenre stemmed from their globally popular releases by Danny Tenaglia, Junior Vasquez, Deep Dish, Eric Kupper (aka K-Scope) and Murk amongst others. This popularity led to the formation of a UK sub-label, Tribal United Kingdom. The label also helped launch European artists Farley & Heller, Salt City Orchestra, The Underground Sound Of Lisbon and others who produced in this style.

== Stylistic elements ==
In many tribal house tracks, it is rare to find a core melody or prolonged synth sound, such as those found in house music and similar electronic music styles. Instead, tribal house tracks rely on sophisticated drum patterns for their rhythm. A track can consist of several different drum sounds.

There is no clear-cut definition of tribal house music, instead tracks are usually classified or perceived as tribal because of their live sound. Tribal house is reminiscent of the Indigenous music of various tribes of Africa and South America, and it is not unusual for this music to feature chanting and ululation as a cappellas. Tribal music can be produced with either live (i.e. with real drums and instruments) or digital instrumentation: however, live-produced music of this sort in the purest sense is seen as ethnic, while digital tribal music is called 'tribal house'.

Tribal house is a fusion of various styles of electronic dance music (see Latin house), and can range from uplifting and cheerful to dark and aggressive in mood. It can sometimes distort the boundaries between dark house, which is an offshoot of progressive house, and tech-house, a more techno-driven, "sharper" house percussion beat, as if mixing intelligent dance music and minimal techno.

== Current popularity ==
Tribal house is currently the primary genre of dance music played in the Circuit scene, large festival-like dance events held world-wide that can be described as the equivalent of a rave party. While this is the broad term generally used to describe the music played at these events, the actual music played by disc jockeys often will be a wider range of subgenres within house music, but often maintaining a tribal house characteristic in the sound of the tracks chosen. This music first entered the scene in the 1990s through the releases of music labels like Tribal America.

In the early 2000s, tribal house evolved into a very percussive, repetitive hard-edged sound that was frequently described as 'pots and pans' for its supposed similarity to the sound made by banging such cookware together. In the mid-2000s, the sound shifted to incorporate more vocals, perhaps as a reaction to the extremity of the 'pots and pans' sound. Presently, tribal house remixes played by DJs frequently are the 'dub' versions, remixes that use only minimal vocals from the original track, with the music often in a minor key to keep it sounding edgier and more tribal, unlike the major key that a more mainstream club remix might use.

== See also ==
- Styles of house music
