= Adam Neely =

American YouTuber and musician (born 1988)

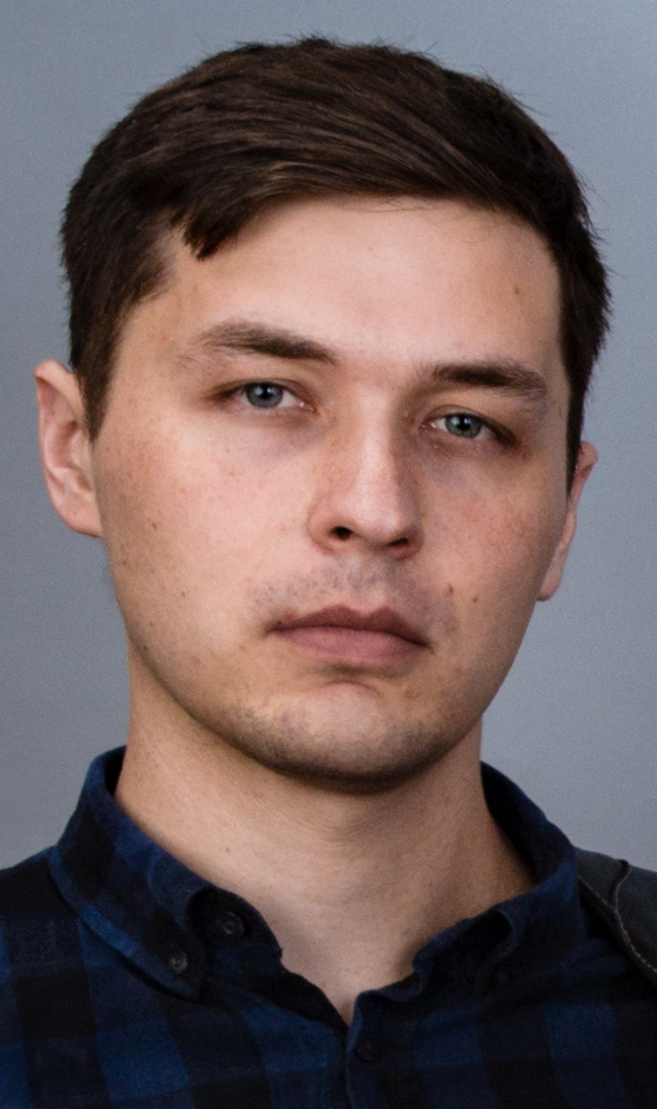
- Neely in 2019

Background information
- Born: 1988 (age 37–38)
- Genres: Jazz; electronic; indie; nu jazz; EDM
- Occupations: Musician; composer; YouTuber; record producer; educational entertainer
- Instruments: Bass guitar; keyboards
- Years active: 2006–present
- Website: www.adamneely.com

YouTube information
- Channel: Adam Neely
- Subscribers: 1.82 million
- Views: 257 million
- Last updated: April 5, 2026

Adam Neely (born 1988) is an American bassist, YouTuber, and jazz musician based in New York City. His YouTube content includes Q&A videos, vlogs about performing music, and video essays about online music culture. As a musician, he performs with groups including the electro-jazz duo Sungazer (with drummer Shawn Crowder) and the instrumental band Aberdeen.

Neely began playing bass guitar and composing jazz music in high school. He studied jazz composition at Berklee College of Music and the Manhattan School of Music. He began making YouTube content in 2006, initially creating lessons for bass guitarists before shifting toward edutainment about music theory in the 2010s. He and similar YouTubers established the community of Music Theory YouTube, and he became a celebrity among music theory communities. He created a 2019 internet challenge that involved playing 7-over-11 polyrhythms at 7-Eleven stores. He has made videos discussing musical copyright cases such as Gray v. Perry. He collaborated with music theorist Philip Ewell on a 2020 video essay, "Music Theory and White Supremacy".

== Education ==
Adam Neely was born in 1988. His mother, Cathryn Frazier-Neely, worked as a singer and instructor of avant-garde classical music. Neely began playing bass guitar when he joined a band in high school and gained more interest in the instrument after attending a jazz concert by Dave Brubeck and bassist Christian McBride. He joined his school jazz band and began composing music, with the support of his teacher.

Adam Neely graduated from Berklee College of Music with a Bachelor of Arts in Jazz Composition in 2009 and in 2012, received a Masters of Music in Jazz Composition from the Manhattan School of Music as directed under Jim McNeely. He was awarded the Herb Alpert ASCAP Young Jazz Composer award in 2012 and 2015 as well as the Jerome Fund commission prize in 2014, for his work "Exigence". Neely initially planned on a career in academia.

== Career ==
Neely began making YouTube videos in 2006 and regularly posted while attending Berklee. Neely's initially made videos teaching bass guitar, inspired by the burgeoning DIY culture of music lessons by amateurs. Like other music-themed YouTubers of the time, he mentioned music theory only as part of instrument lessons. He focused on being a full-time YouTuber at the suggestion of a friend after experiencing burnout from his job as a gig musician. Neely integrated the strategies of viral music content creators and of broader edutainment creators. As his audience expanded beyond bass players, he diversified his content to include music videos, reharmonizations of songs, and "gig vlogs".

Music YouTubers such as Neely, Rick Beato, Aimee Nolte, and 12tone shifted toward curiosity content, teaching advanced music theory to a general audience, around 2016. His 2018 livestream series Musica Analytica consisted of conversations with YouTubers 12tone, Sideways, and 8-bit Music Theory. This introduced these YouTubers to each other's audiences, contributing to the establishment of the Music Theory YouTube genre.

In a 2018 review of the movie Whiplash, he criticized it for misrepresenting jazz culture and using it only as a plot point. He presented a talk at SXSW 2019 analyzing spoken language through the lens of music.

External videos
- 7:11 Polyrhythms

Neely originated an internet challenge called "7-Eleven polyrhythms" in early 2019. He posted videos on YouTube and Instagram showing how to play a 7-over-11 polyrhythm and told people to play the rhythm at a 7-Eleven store. Neely combined the popularity of the difficulty of polyrhythms with an iconic number, saying, "Memes can be a way to musical aptitude." Hundreds of social media users attempted the challenge; some failed. A YouTube video by Alex Becerra of Mexico City, titled "Playing a 7/11 polyrhythm inside a 7-Eleven on July 11th at 7:11 for 7 minutes and 11 seconds", received millions of views and was positively reviewed by Kevin Cortez of The A.V. Club Other versions involved people using one hand to play The Lick and the other to play a song like "All Star" or "Never Gonna Give You Up". The trend became one of the most popular music theory memes.

Neely has made videos about musical copyright disputes. In the case Gray v. Perry, he said that a jury's decision "sets a dangerous precedent" by ruling that Katy Perry's song "Dark Horse" had copied an ostinato from "Joyful Noise" by Flame. He argued that other aspects of the songs were not similar and that the ostinato was too unoriginal to be copyrightable. His video about the case received a YouTube copyright strike by Warner Chappell Music for featuring "Dark Horse", despite the fact that the segment cited in the claim actually used "Joyful Noise". In a follow-up video, Neely criticized that Warner Chappell "specifically [targeted]" him despite his support of their case. In a video about the suit against Ed Sheeran over similarities between his song "Thinking Out Loud" and Marvin Gaye's "Let's Get It On", he compared it to Pharrell Williams v. Bridgeport Music. He said, "The fear is that you can own a groove. And because you can own a groove, you can own genre."

External videos
- Music Theory and White Supremacy

Neely published a 44-minute video essay titled, "Music Theory and White Supremacy", in 2020. It featured music theory professor Philip Ewell, who had authored a controversial paper the same year arguing that the field of music theory largely promotes an ethnocentric view of music by disproportionately teaching the techniques of 18th-century Western classical music. In the video, Neely argues Western music theory emphasizes outdated concepts like figured bass while inadequately describing traditions such as Indian classical music. The video introduced Ewell's anti-racist perspective to a large audience. A thread about it on the subreddit r/musictheory had many commenters who argued against it. The video received 500,000 views within days of publication.

In a video about "The Girl from Ipanema", he argued that the version of the song in the Real Book loses the complexity of the original bossa nova song in order to fit within the jazz tradition. In a September 2023 deep dive video titled, "Is Laufey Jazz?", he analyzed the stylistic choices and "cultural foundations" of Laufey, classifying her music as mid-century pop with various influences.

=== Music performance ===
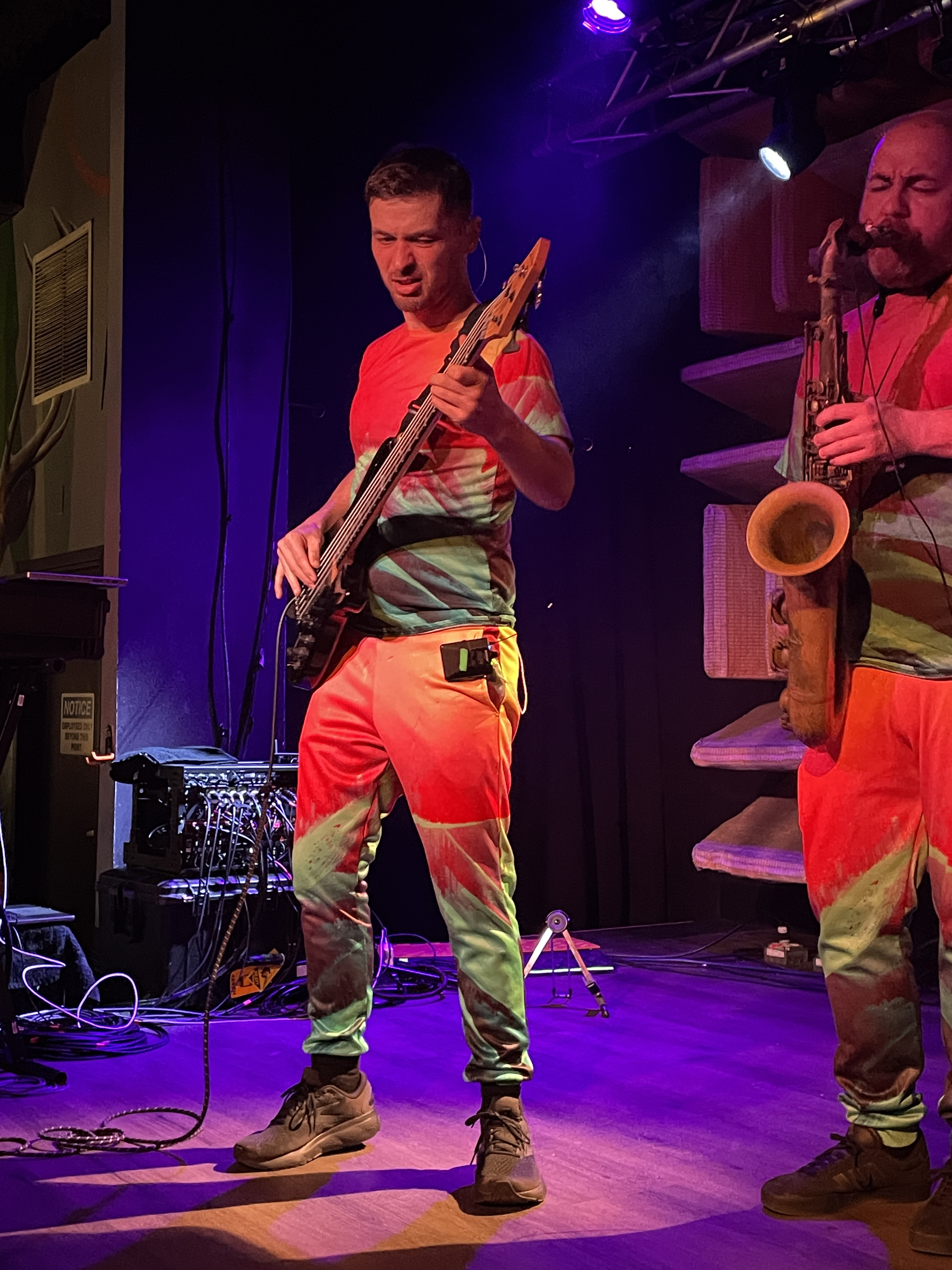
Neely performing in Indianapolis, Indiana in January 2025 with saxophonist Jared Yee.

Neely is the bassist and a founding member of the electro-jazz band Sungazer alongside drummer Shawn Crowder. The band went on tour in 2018. In March 2020, Sungazer and Shubh Saran went on the Shubhgazer tour, performing at five cities in India. The band debuted its second EP, Sungazer vol. 2, on the tour. In 2024, Sungazer was a supporting act for a North American tour by guitarist Plini.

On May 18–20, 2019, Adam Neely, as a member of the band Aberdeen, was hired by the United States Department of State to go to Kyrgyzstan. Their tour consisted of a rock concert at the Ololohaus Erkindik in Bishkek, joined by the Kyrgyz band Choro; a workshop for students at the A. Novoi School in the Osh Region, then at the Osh Regional Library; and a concert at School #29 in Bishkek. He has also performed with the electro-jazz and djent-influenced inside//outside, the rock band Bright and Loud, the indie soul band sóto, the ensemble Mass Extinction Event, and other New York City artists.

== Style ==
Neely's YouTube content includes vlogs, short video essays, Q&A videos, and deep dives about musical trends. Several of his video essays deal with internet culture, with topics including the vaporwave genre and the trend of sea shanties on TikTok. He told the magazine Spin that his video topics were, "the stuff I get excited about", rather than what is covered in music education. His Q&A videos have titles and thumbnails that feature a single question to draw in viewers. His "gig vlogs" give insight into his work as a professional musician in New York City and around the world. Neely films his videos at his apartment in New York City. He co-writes original scores for his videos and edits them using Final Cut Pro to match the timing of the music.

Neely is a celebrity within online communities about music theory who has inspired internet memes and influenced an online jazz movement. His inside jokes incorporate memes and music theory content, contributing to the viral spread of his content. He creates collaborations with YouTubers with dissimilar musical niches, such as Rob Scallon.

== Awards ==
- ASCAP Young Jazz Composer Award (2011, 2012, 2014)
- Jerome Fund Commission (2014)

== Discography ==
=== As Adam Neely ===
Albums and EPs
Year	Title
2014	time//motion//wine
2018	Gig Vlog M I X T A P E vol. 1
2019	two microtonal lo-fi jams
2019	Christmas Microtonal Lo-Fi Hip Hop EP
2020	polytonal lo-fi
2020	A Very 15/16 Christmas
2025	The Way Under (with Lau Noah)

Singles
Year	Title
2016	"優待 k m a r t ジャズ"
2017	"Clarity" (with Little Kruta)
2017	"Have Yourself a Merry Little Christmas" (feat. Justina Maria Sóto)
2018	"no pride (leonard bernstein remix)"
2018	"the '15 minute tune'"
2019	"7:11"
2019	"...it ain't my fault..."
2020	"we got people playing pianos"
2020	"g a r o t a"
2020	"a.i. lo-fi #1"
2020	"Castaways" (ft. Martina DaSilva)
2022	"in this moment"

=== With Sungazer ===
Albums and EPs
Year	Title
2014	sungazer vol. I
2019	sungazer vol. 2
2021	Perihelion
2024	Against the Fall of Night

Singles
Year	Title
2017	"Want to Want Me" (Jason Derulo cover)
2024	"Against the Fall of Night"
2024	"Cool 7"
