= Gray v. Perry =

Copyright infringement lawsuit in California

- Court: United States District Court for the Central District of California
- Full case name: Marcus Gray et al. v. Katy Perry et al.
- Decided: August 13, 2018 (summary judgment denied); July 29, 2019 (jury verdict); March 16, 2020 (judgment as a matter of law granted, verdict vacated)
- Docket nos.: 2:15-cv-05642
- Citations: 2017 WL 1240740 (partial summary judgment granted); 2018 WL 3954008 (summary judgment denied); 2020 WL 1275221 (judgment as a matter of law granted, verdict vacated); 28 F.4th 87 (affirming grant of judgment as a matter of law on appeal to the Ninth Circuit)

Case history
- Appealed to: United States Court of Appeals for the Ninth Circuit

Court membership
- Judge sitting: Christina A. Snyder

Keywords
- Substantial similarity

Marcus Gray et al. v. Katy Perry et al. was a copyright infringement lawsuit against Katheryn Elizabeth Hudson ("Katy Perry"), Jordan Houston ("Juicy J"), Lukasz Gottwald ("Dr. Luke"), Karl Martin Sandberg ("Max Martin"), Henry Russell Walter ("Cirkut"), Capitol Records and others, in which the plaintiffs Marcus Gray ("Flame"), Emanuel Lambert ("Da' T.R.U.T.H.") and Chike Ojukwu alleged that Perry's song "Dark Horse" infringed their exclusive rights in their song "Joyful Noise" pursuant to 17 U.S.C § 106.

The focus of the similarity was a short descending pattern known in music as an "ostinato". In both songs, a short ostinato is used repeatedly to form part of the beat of each song and both ostinatos share similar descending shapes. Gray et al. claimed that the instrumental beat of the ostinato in "Joyful Noise" was protectable original expression and that Perry et al. had access to and copied the ostinato when composing "Dark Horse."

On March 16, 2020, Judge Christina A. Snyder ultimately found that Gray et al. had failed to satisfy the extrinsic test for substantial similarity, overturning a previous jury verdict which had sided with the plaintiffs. Snyder's ruling was affirmed on appeal.

== Background ==
"Joyful Noise" was released in 2008 as a part of the album Our World: Redeemed which debuted at No. 5 on the Billboard Top Gospel Chart in 2008 and was nominated for a Grammy Award for Best Rock or Rap Gospel Album. "Joyful Noise" was extensively played on Christian Radio, and was nominated for the 40th GMA Dove Awards. The track itself peaked at Position 9 on the Billboard Gospel Digital Song Sales chart in 2011, following which, its music video versions were released garnering more than 4 million views at the time of the suit and around 10 million till date.

In September 2013, Capitol Records released the "Dark Horse" song as a promotional single from Perry's album, entitled Prism. By January 2014, it had reached Number 1 on the Billboard 100 chart, where it remained for weeks.

In both songs, a short ostinato is used repeatedly to form part of the "beat" of each song and both ostinatos share the same descending shape, though the ostinato of "Joyful Noise" uses three notes, while that of "Dark Horse" uses four.

The defendants alleged that public distribution of CDs of Prism, duplication and uploading of digital versions of defendants' song on websites for purchase, as well as public performance of the song at various concerts and events by the plaintiff violated their copyright in "Joyful Noise". In addition, Capitol Records prepared the music video of defendants' song and arranged for its commercial syndication and publication on YouTube and other commercial sites.

The defendants emphasized that unauthorized copying, distribution, and public performance of "Joyful Noise" caused them damage and irreparable harm, and requested permanent injunctive relief since the defendants failed to cease infringing activities despite notice of infringement. They also asserted reputational harm for "Joyful Noise" being falsely associated with anti-Christian witchcraft, paganism, black magic, and Illuminati imagery evoked by the "Dark Horse" song. Apart from equitable relief, the defendants sought monetary damages, defendant's profits, interest, costs and reasonable attorney's fees, and requested a jury trial.

== Summary judgment ==
In August 2018, U.S. District Judge Christina A. Snyder denied the defendants’ motion for summary judgment, finding existence of genuine issues of material facts as to questions of defendant's access to the plaintiff's song, and substantial similarity between the "Dark Horse" and "Joyful Noise".

=== Access ===
The defendants asserted that there was a high burden to show widespread dissemination and popularity, which had not been met. In response, the plaintiffs pointed to evidence showing that prior to the creation of "Dark Horse", videos of "Joyful Noise" had amassed nearly four million online views on YouTube and Myspace, and enjoyed popularity and acclaim in the Christian music industry. The writers of "Dark Horse" said they never viewed "Joyful Noise", nor had they heard of the plaintiffs previously. The defendants averred lack of commercial success, and urged the court to discount the importance of online views on mentioned platforms since they don't show the actual number of unique human views.

The court disagreed with the defendants, holding that the plaintiffs only needed to show a reasonable possibility of access to the protected work for showing a genuine issue for trial, and found such possibility to exist due to widespread dissemination of "Joyful Noise". While the court agreed that mere posting of a video on online platforms was insufficient to show access, it sided with the plaintiffs, reasoning that, although the plaintiffs had not shown evidence of commercial success, they had demonstrated a triable issue of fact as to access because "Joyful Noise" achieved critical success, including a Grammy nomination, and was readily available and viewed millions of times on YouTube and Myspace.

The court likewise rejected the argument pertaining to unsatisfactory rebuttal of the defendants' evidence of independent creation, noting that "the strength of defendants' evidence for independent creation is a factual issue for the jury to determine at trial, and is not an issue suited for determination at [the summary judgment] stage."

=== Substantial similarity ===
The court mentioned that for the purposes of summary judgment, only the extrinsic test was important because the subjective question of intrinsic similarity must be left to the jury.

The plaintiffs submitted, through their musicologist Todd Decker, that the songs shared "five or six points of similarity"; specifically, the ostinatos, which were either identical in both songs, or nearly similar in their phrase length, rhythm, pitch content, and timbre.

The defendants attempted to convince the judge otherwise through the report of their own expert, arguing that the two songs shared no significant similarities beyond generic elements. They argued that commonplace elements are not copyrightable to begin with because they are part of the inventory of fundamental musical ideas. Perry's musicologist, Lawrence Ferrera, exhibited over thirty songs composed prior to "Joyful Noise" which shared similar elements with both songs. Some of these included much older songs; "Mary Had a Little Lamb", "Jolly Old Saint Nicholas", and "Merrily We Roll Along". Ferrera also argued for a more holistic comparison of the songs' elements, not just the ostinatos themselves. Todd Decker rebutted by stating that the examples were gross generalizations about the use of ostinato, and he continued to draw arguments to plain audible similarities of the common ostinato in both songs.

Acknowledging that certain elements plaintiffs' expert relied upon to support substantial similarity may be individually unprotectable, the court reasoned that Decker's expert testimony involved identification of particular features, which in combination, could support a jury's finding of substantial similarity. The court, unconvinced by defendant's criticisms of Decker, relating to transcription of musical elements of the songs and abstraction of unprotectible elements of "Joyful Noise" prior to comparison, found a genuine issue of material fact as to substantial similarity between the two songs.

== Jury trial ==
On July 29, 2019, a nine-person federal jury, consisting of six women and three men, found that Perry, Dr. Luke, Max Martin, Cirkut, Sarah Hudson, who only wrote the lyrics, and Juicy J, who only wrote the rap, were guilty of infringement, along with Capitol Records, Warner Bros. Music Publishing, Kobalt Publishing, and Kasz Money Inc.

The defendants had testified that they had never heard "Joyful Noise", or of the plaintiffs, before the lawsuit. The plaintiffs responded that the song was widely distributed, with millions of plays on YouTube and Spotify, and reminded the jury that Perry, herself began her career from the Christian Music World. Jurors agreed, finding that the song was distributed widely enough that there was a reasonable chance that the "Dark Horse" writers had heard it.

Plaintiffs argued that there was substantial similarity between the songs since Perry and her team had copied the main beat and instrumental line of "Joyful Noise" and the same featured in a substantial part of "Dark Horse". Perry's attorney, Christine Lepera said during closing arguments of the trial that, "they're trying to own basic building blocks of music, the alphabet of music that should be available to everyone." The jury disagreed, finding that the bumping beat and riff at the heart of "Joyful Noise" were original enough to be copyrighted, handing the victory over to the plaintiffs.

Upon jury's finding of infringement, the plaintiffs asked for damages amounting to $20 million contending that "Dark Horse" was responsible for $31 million coming in to Capitol Records, counting all profits from album and live DVD on which it appeared. Capitol Records disputed that accounting for costs, their profits from the song itself, were only $650,000 and the defense lawyers argued that $360,000 was a reasonable figure for damages. The jury found that 22.5 percent of the profits from "Dark Horse" were attributable to parts of "Joyful Noise". On August 1, the jury decided that awarded the plaintiffs $2.78 million in damages, of which Perry herself was ordered to pay $550,000.

== Motion for judgment as a matter of law ==
In October 2019, the defendants filed an appeal against the jury verdict calling the decision "a grave miscarriage of justice".

Defendants' contentions

Perry et al., moved for judgment as a matter of law asserting that there was no sufficient evidentiary basis supporting either the jury's findings on substantial similarity between the two songs, or defendant's access to "Joyful Noise" since no direct and circumstantial evidence was presented, the dissemination was in a niche market, and defendants did not avail the opportunity to access "Joyful Noise". They also challenged the jury's decision on unrebutted and unimpeached evidence at trial demonstrating independent creation of "Dark Horse". They further questioned the evidentiary basis for the opinion that the Ojukwu's instrumental beat was itself copyrighted remarking that "Joyful Noise" was a derivative work of that beat and not a work of joint authorship. The defendants finally challenged the jury's finding that 22.5 percent of the net profit earned from "Dark Horse" was attributable to the use of the "Joyful Noise" and the exclusion of costs in calculating profits.

In the alternative, the defendants requested for a new trial citing the same reasons and asserting that award was excessive and contrary to the clear weight of the evidence. The motion for a new trial highlighted that Plaintiffs' counsel and witnesses, Dr. Todd Decker, engaged in misconduct by perversely influencing the jury though his improper and highly prejudicial testimony.

Plaintiffs' contentions

The plaintiffs argued that proper application of the extrinsic test to the facts and evidence submitted must reasonably lead to a clear finding of substantial similarity emphasizing that the Ninth Circuit accords protection to a wide range of musical elements taken alone or in combination. The plaintiffs referred to Swirsky to highlight that, "it cannot be said as a matter of law that seven notes is too short a length to garner copyright protection." The multiple similarities between the songs were not commonplace and Dr. Decker identified several other shared elements which, in combination, contribute to the distinctiveness of the ostinatos. Gray et al., finally submitted that the apportionment determination was fully supported by the evidence, and rather, the evidence actually demonstrated that the damages awarded were insufficient as the jury should not have deducted nearly $5 million in "royalty expenses" in calculating Capitol's profits.

The plaintiffs disputed the motion based on lack of sufficient ground for a new trial since the clear weight of the evidence fully supported the jury's findings on liability. They made reference to Rule 59 and the remittitur standard reiterating that the court has the discretion to grant a new trial "if the verdict appears ... to be against the weight of the evidence", and only if of the firm conviction that a mistake has been committed. Further, there was no misconduct since Dr. Decker's testimony was proper and did not influence the jury on matters of striking similarity as the opinions were on matters exclusively related to the intrinsic test.

Additionally, a group of musicologists submitted an amicus brief supporting the defendant's motion on January 9, 2020.

== District Court judgement ==
The plaintiff had only asserted copying by trying to show access and substantial similarity. The District court employed the two-part test of extrinsic similarity and intrinsic similarity to is determined substantial similarity.

=== Extrinsic test ===
==== Protectability of elements ====
Judge Snyder remarked that the uncontroverted evidence pointed to only one conclusion: that none of the individual elements, as set forth by plaintiff's own musicologist, constituted individually protectable elements.

- First, the key or scale in which a melody is composed is not protectable as a matter of law. Neither are evenly-syncopated rhythms, pitch sequences or chord progressions, protectable as such.
- Second, as conceded by Gray et al., the rhythm or phrase length of eight notes were not independently protectable musical elements.
- Third, because an ostinato is a "basic musical device", and its use is in accordance with rules of consonance common in popular music, it is not the type of musical element that is protectable.
- Fourth, assuming that the timbre or texture, were a product of the composition, they were still not protectable being inherent elements of music, and more attributable to the sound recording.

Finally, the court opined that the musical elements of the ostinato in "Joyful Noise" were not "numerous enough and arranged in a sufficiently original manner to warrant copyright protection." Thus, the court held that neither the individual nor combination of elements in the plaintiff's ostinato were protectable under the extrinsic test.

==== Substantial similarity ====
Perry's lawyers had referred to the Ninth Circuit's influential en banc opinion in favor of Led Zeppelin, as part of their appeal to Judge Snyder. The court, ruling on whether Zeppelin's song "Stairway to Heaven" violated the copyright of the song "Taurus" by the band Spirit, had found that in case of "works where there is a narrow range of available creative choices", the protection available was thin and only towards works "virtually identical" to that of the plaintiff's.

Following the Ninth Circuit's reasoning, the court said that the plaintiff's claim was based on minimally original musical expression that acquires only "thin" protection. Noting that elements in the "Dark Horse" ostinato needed to be "virtually identical" to the "Joyful Noise" ostinato in order to meet the "substantially similar" standard, the court referred to Dr. Decker's testimony.

- First, the testimony set forth that the pitches on the seventh and eighth beats of the "Joyful Noise" ostinato were different from the pitches on the corresponding beats of the "Dark Horse" ostinato in "Joyful Noise".
- Second, ignoring Dr. Decker's opinion, the court found considered at least six instances of portamento in the composition in "Joyful Noise" not present in "Dark Horse" as a significant factor.
- Third, Dr. Decker himself acknowledged that the compositions for the ostinatos use different keys, tempos, harmonies, and rhythms.

The court concluded that, even if the 8-note ostinato in "Joyful Noise" was protected, the evidence submitted did not support a legal conclusion that the two ostinatos were, objectively, substantially similar, lest being "virtually identical".

=== Intrinsic tests ===
==== Access ====
The court pointed out that the question was not of "proven access based on preponderance of evidence but whether reasonable minds could find that defendants had a reasonable opportunity to have heard Plaintiff's song before they created their own song." The court believed that the question must be deferred to jury's determination of reasonableness and held that the evidence presented by plaintiffs at trial was sufficient to support the jury's finding as to access, although the court might have found otherwise.

==== Substantial similarity ====
The court also considered substantial similarity pursuant to the intrinsic test, examining whether an ordinary, reasonable person would consider the total concept and feel of "Joyful Noise" and "Dark Horse" to be substantially similar. Despite the plaintiff’s ostinato failing the extrinsic test, the court refused to resolve the intrinsic test as a matter of law, and held that "a reasonable jury could nevertheless conclude that the 'concept and feel' of the two ostinatos were 'intrinsically' similar."

=== Other defenses ===
Despite granting defendants judgment as a matter of law, the court also entertained defendants' other arguments and affirmative defenses, but rejected them all.

==== Independent creation ====
Defendants had proffered extensive testimony about independent creation the ostinato in "Dark Horse". The court said that the jury was entitled to credit or discredit this self-interested testimony as it saw fit, and once the jury decided that the testimony was not credible enough to establish "proof of independent creation", the Court must, yield to that determination.

==== Failure to establish ownership of a joint work ====
The defendants had contended that "Joyful Noise" was a derivative work since the ostinato in it was originally part of a beat published earlier by Chike Ojukwu. They argued that plaintiffs' copyright does not extend to protect the preexisting material embodied in the beat.

Plaintiffs rebutted arguing that "Joyful Noise" was a joint work of authorship since, and that Ojukwu retained a 50% ownership stake in the song created with his beat. The district court held that evidence presented showing that Ojukwu and Gray contracted to become coauthors of "Joyful Noise", was dispositive and established plaintiffs' ownership as a matter of law, and defendants were not entitled to judgment as a matter of law on this basis.

==== Liability for individual defendants ====
The defendants contended that the evidence presented did not support a finding that any defendants other than Walter ("Cirkut") and Capitol Records were individually liable for the alleged infringement of "Joyful Noise".

Reiterating the opinion of the Ninth Circuit that, "in copyright infringement cases, any member of the distribution chain of allegedly infringing products can be jointly and severally liable for the alleged misconduct", The court said that each of the defendants named could be liable for infringement based on their role in the "distribution chain".

==== Failure to apportion ====
The defendants contended that the jury's finding of 22.5 percent of net profit derived from "Dark Horse" being attributable to the use of plaintiff's ostinato reflected "pure speculation unsupported by evidence". Evidence established that the infringing ostinato in "Dark Horse" plays across 45% of the composition, based on which plaintiffs requested 45% of defendants' aggregated profits, of which the jury evidently decided to divide plaintiffs' requested amount in half based on evidence presented. The court commented that the jury's damages award was not so clearly unsupported by substantial evidence as to warrant vacatur, and an award of "less than 100% of the profits but more than the percentage estimates of [defendant's] experts does not represent clear error."

==== Failure to deduct overhead ====
To determine the defendants' net profits, the Court instructed the jury to "deduct all appropriate expenses incurred by that defendant from that defendant's gross revenue." Appropriate expenses include "fixed overhead" costs, provided that the overhead "contributed" to the infringing good.

Capitol Records presented testimony that its deductible expenses amounted to $11,772,912, including $5,103,213 in overhead costs while plaintiffs sought to discredit this overhead figure suggesting that did not "contribute" to the production, marketing, or commercial success of "Dark Horse". Weighing the evidence, the jury deducted only $6,669,699 of the $11,772,912 in claimed expenses from the total claimed profits, declining to deduct the $5,103,213, and the jury's decision is supported by substantial evidence adduced at trial, and not otherwise contrary to law.

== Conclusion ==
The court granted the defendants' motion for judgment as a matter of law and vacated the jury's verdicts as to liability and damages since Gray et al., failed to satisfy the extrinsic test for substantial similarity. The court held that a new trial would have been allowed, as the jury disregarded the weight of the evidence, highlighting that it was Katy Perry's star power and Capitol's marketing efforts, and not the similarity to plaintiffs' ostinato, that made "Dark Horse" a commercial success. However, since the defendants were entitled to judgment as a matter of law, defendants' motion for a new trial was denied as moot.

== Aftermath and appeal ==
Adam Neely, a jazz musician in New York, highlighted the dangerous precedent of allowing exclusive rights over building blocks of musical compositions. Since the verdict on "Blurred Lines" there was an emergence of lawsuits focusing on commonplace musical elements in combination; and the decisions in Zeppelin and Perry et al., have been received as a move in the right direction by many litigators and musicians. Christine Lepera, the lawyer for Katy Perry said that the chilling effect created by "the 'Blurred Lines' curse" in the music industry had been lifted with this verdict.

Marcus Gray filed a notice of appeal to the Ninth Circuit on April 13, 2020. The Ninth Circuit ruled 3–0 in March 2022 in Perry's favor, upholding the district court's ruling. In the opinion, the court stated "The portion of the 'Joyful Noise' ostinato that overlaps with the 'Dark Horse' ostinato consists of a manifestly conventional arrangement of musical building blocks. Allowing a copyright over this material would essentially amount to allowing an improper monopoly over two-note pitch sequences or even the minor scale itself." The court's opinion focused on the extrinsic test for substantial similarity and did not comment on the other issues decided by the district court, concluding that it was unnecessary to "reach any other issue in this case." The Ninth Circuit's opinion was authored by Judge Milan D. Smith, who had also recently authored the court's opinion in another high-profile music copyright case, Williams v. Gaye. The opinion was recognized within the legal community as one of the most important copyright decisions of 2022.

== See also ==
- List of songs subject to plagiarism disputes
