= Doe v. CVS Pharmacy, Inc. =

- Court: United States Court of Appeals for the Ninth Circuit
- Argued: June 2, 2003
- Decided: December 9 2020
- Citation: 982 F.3d 1204 (9th Cir. 2020)

Case history
- Prior history: 2018 WL 6593843 (N.D. Cal. Dec. 14, 2018) (granting motion to dismiss)
- Subsequent history: Cert. granted, CVS Pharmacy Inc. v. Doe, 141 S. Ct. 2882 (2021), dismissed, 142 S. Ct. 480 (2021)

Court membership
- Judges sitting: Milan Smith, Andrew D. Hurwitz, Timothy M. Burgess (sitting by designation)

Case opinions
- Majority: Smith, joined by Hurwitz, Burgess

Laws applied
- Rehabilitation Act of 1973

Doe v. CVS Pharmacy, Inc., 982 F.3d 1204 (9th Cir. 2020), was a case related to whether the Rehabilitation Act of 1973 provides a disparate impact cause of action for plaintiffs alleging disability discrimination, decided by the United States Court of Appeals for the Ninth Circuit in 2020. It was appealed to the United States Supreme Court as CVS Pharmacy, Inc. v. Doe (Docket 20–1374), but settled and was dismissed before argument the following year.

== Background ==
The John Doe plaintiffs were individuals living with HIV/AIDS who relied on employer-sponsored health insurance to obtain essential medications. Historically, they were able to fill prescriptions at community pharmacies, where they received in-person counseling and monitoring from pharmacists familiar with their medical history. However, the health plans administered by CVS Caremark required that specialty medications, including HIV/AIDS treatments, be dispensed only through a designated specialty pharmacy program. Under this program, medications were delivered by mail or made available for pickup at CVS locations, and only prescriptions obtained this way were considered "in-network", with full insurance coverage. If plaintiffs filled prescriptions elsewhere, they faced significantly higher out-of-pocket costs.

The plaintiffs alleged that this new arrangement disrupted continuity of care, exposed them to privacy risks, created logistical burdens, and effectively denied them access to the pharmaceutical counseling necessary to manage their condition. They claimed the program discriminated against them as individuals with disabilities, in violation of the Affordable Care Act (ACA), the Rehabilitation Act, the Americans with Disabilities Act (ADA), California's Unruh Civil Rights Act, the California Unfair Competition Law (UCL), and provisions of the Employee Retirement Income Security Act (ERISA). Section 504 of the Rehabilitation Act prohibits discrimination based on disability by any program receiving federal funds. The plaintiffs sued CVS on the basis of a disparate impact.

The case concerned both Title I and Title III of the Americans with Disabilities Act of 1990, because it involved both the employers of the plaintiffs through whom they received health insurance thus invoking Title I, and public accommodations to the plaintiffs as customers of a business open to the public, thus invoking Title III.

== Legal outcome ==
The case was initially filed in February 2018 in United States District Court for the Northern District of California, where District Judge Edward M. Chen dismissed the case with prejudice, holding that the program did not explicitly target HIV patients.

However, in 2020, the Ninth Circuit Court of Appeals revived the suit, finding that although the statutes in question did not create healthcare-specific causes of action, the program's effect could nonetheless be discriminatory, even absent intent.

Writing for the panel, Judge Milan Smith held that while Section 1557 of the ACA does not create a new, independent anti-discrimination standard, it incorporates the standards of the Rehabilitation Act. Applying the framework of Alexander v. Choate, the court concluded that the plaintiffs had plausibly alleged a denial of “meaningful access” to their prescription drug benefits, which could support a disparate impact claim under Section 504 of the Rehabilitation Act. The court therefore revived the ACA claim and the UCL claim to the extent it was predicated on ACA violations.

The Ninth Circuit affirmed the dismissal of other claims, holding that the ADA did not apply because employer-provided health plans are not places of public accommodation, and that plaintiffs had failed to identify specific ERISA plan provisions that had been violated. Similarly, the court found the UCL claim under the "unfair" business practices prong inadequately pleaded, and ruled that the plaintiffs had waived their claim for declaratory relief by failing to raise it on appeal.

== Supreme Court and aftermath ==
CVS appealed to the Supreme Court, and certiorari was granted in the case on July 2, 2021.

On November 10, 2021, the parties jointly stipulated that they would no longer litigate this case before the Supreme Court. Counsel for the plaintiffs reported being surprised when CVS announced their intent to dismiss the case, attributing it to pressure from disability groups and the filing of a brief in favor of the plaintiffs by the United States Department of Justice.

Doe v. CVS Pharmacy remains one of the most prominent federal appellate cases to address whether Section 504 of the Rehabilitation Act encompasses disparate impact discrimination. While the Ninth Circuit permitted such a claim, a similar case in the Sixth Circuit, Doe v. BlueCross BlueShield of Tennessee, did not. The dismissal of Doe v. CVS Pharmacy prior to a ruling from the Supreme Court left the question unresolved at the national level.

Following the dismissal of the case in the Supreme Court, litigation resumed in the Northern District of California, where the case remained open as of April 2024, when Judge Chen denied a new motion to dismiss by CVS.
