= Todd Decker =

- Education: Fresno Pacific College (BA); San Francisco Conservatory of Music (MM); University of Michigan (PhD)
- Occupations: Musicologist; professor
- Years active: 1989-present

Todd Decker is an American musicologist. He is the Paul Tietjens Professor of Music at Washington University in St. Louis. Decker edited the journal American Music from 2020 to 2022.

Decker graduated from Fresno Pacific College in 1989, then earned a Master of Music degree in harpsichord from the San Francisco Conservatory of Music in 1991. He completed his PhD at the University of Michigan in 2007 and joined the faculty of the Arts and Sciences at Washington University in St. Louis that same year.

Decker's research, teaching, and publications generally focus on American popular music from 1920 to the present, with particular emphasis on the Broadway and Hollywood musical, Hollywood film music (and sound), the recorded popular music industry, and pre-1970 jazz.

== Expert witness ==
In 2019, Decker testified as an expert witness in a lawsuit against Katy Perry, stating that Christian rapper Flame produced a "unique" eight-note ostinato — a repeating sequence of musical figures within a song — which Flame's legal team claimed Perry plagiarized. Decker further testified that the ostinatos used in Perry's 2013 song "Dark Horse" and Flame's 2008 song "Joyful Noise" share "five or six points of similarity." A jury verdict that found the Katy Perry song did infringe the copyright of Flame's song was overturned on appeal on the March 16, 2020. US District Court judge Christina A Snyder said "It is undisputed in this case" that the ostinato was "not a particularly unique or rare combination."

Music theorist and YouTuber Adam Neely criticized Decker's arguments as "intellectually dishonest", and claimed that Decker had "sold us all out" with his involvement in the case.

== Publications ==
Books

- Decker, Todd (2011). Music Makes Me: Fred Astaire and Jazz. University of California Press. ISBN 978-0520268906.
- Decker, Todd (2013). Show Boat: Performing Race in an American Musical. Oxford University Press. ISBN 978-0190250539.
- Decker, Todd (2015). Who Should Sing 'Ol' Man River'?: The Lives of an American Song. Oxford University Press. ISBN 978-0199389186.
- Decker, Todd (2017). Hymns for the Fallen: Combat Movie Music and Sound after Vietnam. University of California Press. ISBN 978-0520282322.
- Decker, Todd (2022). Astaire by Numbers: Time & the Straight White Male Dancer. Oxford University Press. ISBN 978-0197643594.
