= Pharrell Williams v. Bridgeport Music =

Appeals court case

- Court: United States Court of Appeals for the Ninth Circuit
- Full case name: Pharrell Williams et al v. Bridgeport Music et al
- Argued: October 6, 2017
- Decided: March 22, 2018
- Citations: Williams v. Gaye, 895 F.3d 1106 (9th Cir. 2018)

Case history
- Appealed from: United States District Court for the Central District of California

Holding
- The panel partially affirmed the District Court's judgement after a jury trial. Copyright protection in musical composition is not limited to a narrow range of expressions.

Court membership
- Judges sitting: Milan Smith, Mary H. Murguia, and Jacqueline H. Nguyen

Case opinions
- Decision by: Smith
- Concurrence: Murguia
- Dissent: Nguyen

Laws applied
- Copyright Act of 1976; 17 U.S.C. §§ 101, 102, 106, 504, 505

Pharrell Williams et al. v Bridgeport Music et al., No. 15-56880 (9th Cir. July 11, 2018) is a United States Court of Appeals for the Ninth Circuit case concerning copyright infringement of sound recording. In August 2013, Pharrell Williams, Robin Thicke and Clifford Joseph Harris (known by his stage name "T.I.") filed a complaint for declaratory relief against the members of Marvin Gaye's family and Bridgeport Music in the United States District Court for the Central District of California, alleging that the song "Blurred Lines" did not infringe the copyright of defendants in "Got to Give It Up" and "Sexy Ways" respectively.

On October 6, 2017, the Circuit Court held oral arguments on the appeal to vacate the district court's judgement. The Ninth Circuit upheld the District Court's decision against Williams and Thicke and affirmed liability of millions of dollars in damages. It was established that "Got to Give It Up" is "entitled to broad protection against copyright infringement liability because musical compositions are not confined to a narrow range of expression".

== Background ==
“Blurred Lines" is a song performed by Robin Thicke, featuring Pharrell Williams and T.I., and the trio shared writing credits. The song was a hit, spending twelve weeks at the top of the Billboard Hot 100 and ultimately reaching the number two spot on the year-end Billboard Hot 100 chart.

However, the song became a subject for dispute with Gaye's family and Bridgeport Music, who claimed that the song infringed on their copyright and was inspired by their songs "Got to Give It Up" (1977) and "Sexy Ways" (1974) respectively.

=== Complaint for declaratory relief ===
Notably, unlike the traditional manner, the litigation started with preemptive filing of declaratory relief. In August 2013, Williams, Thicke and T.I. filed a complaint for declaratory relief against Gaye's family and Bridgeport Music. Prior to the complaint, Gaye's family and Bridgeport Music alleged that the plaintiff had "ripped-off" "Got to Give it Up". The complaint argued that "the basis of the Gaye defendants' claims is that "Blurred Lines" and "Got To Give It Up" "feel" or "sound" the same. Being reminiscent of a "sound" is not copyright infringement. The intent in producing "Blurred Lines" was to evoke an era. In reality, the Gaye defendants are claiming ownership of an entire genre, as opposed to a specific work". They argued that they did not copy the expression but only the 'idea' or the 'genre', which is not copyright-able.

==== Plaintiff's disposition ====
Williams stated that the two songs were "completely different", adding "just simply go to the piano and play the two. One's minor and one's major. And not even in the same key". Thicke stated that at the time of recording, he was "high on Vicodin and alcohol when [he] showed up at the studio", and so "[Williams] had the beat and he wrote almost every single part of the song".

==== Counter-claim ====
In the counterclaim, Gaye's family argued that the songs were not merely stylistically similar; instead, they claim that "many of the main vocal and instrumental themes of "Blurred Lines" are rooted in "Got to Give It Up"; namely, the signature phrase, vocal hook, backup vocal hook, their variations, and the keyboard and bass lines and "the substantial similarities are the result of many of the same deliberate creative choices made by their respective composers."

==== Motion for summary judgement ====
In July 2014, the plaintiff filed for a motion of summary judgment. However, on October 30, 2014, the court denied the motion. Judge John A. Kronstadt, after reviewing competing musicologist reports, found "substantial similarity [between "Blurred Lines" and "Got to Give It Up"] to present a genuine issue of material fact", and that the "signature phrases, hooks, bass lines, keyboard chords, harmonic structures and vocal melodies" in both songs were similar".

== Holding ==
=== Trial ===
The trial started in the District Court on February 10, 2015. Plaintiffs filed a successful motion in limine pleading that Gaye's sound recording of "Got to Give It Up" be excluded from being played during the trial. The motion was successful since Marvin Gaye's voice had no relevance in the case. The dispute was limited to the elements from sheet music. Judge Kronstadt stated "I don't expect Gaye's voice to be a part of the case".

The jury was to decide whether "Blurred Lines" infringed upon the following limited elements: i) Signature Phrase ii) Hooks iii) Bass Lines iv) Harmonic Structures, and v) Keyboard Chords. The jury was allowed to hear a limited portion of Gaye's sound recording that substantially reflected the disputed subject-matter. The portion was edited to remove unprotected elements.

On March 10, 2015, the jury unanimously found Thicke and Williams liable for copyright infringement. It awarded a sum of $7.3 million as damages for the infringement to Gaye's family. The amount was reduced by the District Court to $5.3 million, along with 50 percent royalties on future songwriter and publishing revenue of "Blurred Lines".

On January 11, 2016, Gaye's family moved an application for approximately $3.5 million in attorney's fee and costs on the grounds that the jury verdict prevailed on merits, rather than on a technical issue. The Court denied the application and ordered further submissions on the issue of costs.

=== Appeal ===
In August 2016, Thicke, Williams and T.I. appealed against the judgement on the grounds that the Gaye family failed to show substantial similarity between the two songs. Later, a number of amicus curiae briefs were filed in support of the appeal by musicians, musicologists and copyright scholars, including John Oates and R. Kelly. The briefs claimed that the judgement would have a deleterious effect on innovation in popular music industry and that the jury's verdict was based on flawed testimony by Gaye's family musical expert. In March 2018, the three-judge panel at the Court of Appeals upheld the District Court's decision 2–1.

==== Dissent ====
Appellate Court Judge Jacqueline Nguyen wrote a dissenting opinion. She argued that "Blurred Lines" and "Got to Give It Up" differed in "melody, harmony" and "rhythm" and thus lack extrinsic similarity. She claimed that the judgement allowed for protection over musical style, stating that “[the judgement] establishes a dangerous precedent that strikes a devastating blow to future musicians and composers everywhere".

== Subsequent developments ==
In December 2019, the Gaye estate filed a second attempt for $3.5 million in attorney fees and costs, arguing that Williams had committed perjury in a 2019 interview with GQ where he said he "reverse-engineered" Gaye's song. In February 2021, Judge Kronstadt found insufficient evidence to support a finding of perjury, and dismissed the suit.

== Commentary and implication ==
Copyright scholars and musicians closely followed the case since it directly addressed the question of copyright protection for sheet music elements other than melody, harmony and rhythm. Many scholars have expressed concern that the case can open a Pandora's box of litigation and will cause substantial damage to the music industry, potentially causing a chilling effect. Another concern was that the case was essentially decided by the jury and judge, thus potentially failing the requirement of 'extrinsic test'.

In 2022, music business writer Ted Gioia commented that the decision was a watershed moment for music writers and publishers because of the increased risk of copyright lawsuits and added expense that it caused: "The risks have increased enormously since the "Blurred Lines" jury decision of 2015—with the result that additional cash gets transferred from today's musicians to old (or deceased) artists."

== See also ==
- Cultural appropriation
- Inverse ratio rule
- List of songs subject to plagiarism disputes
  - Swirsky v. Carey, where Seth Swirsky and Warryn Campbell alleged that their song "One of Those Love Songs" was plagiarized by Mariah Carey's "Thank God I Found You"
  - Skidmore v. Led Zeppelin, where Spirit's "Taurus" was allegedly plagiarized by Led Zeppelin's "Stairway to Heaven"
  - Gray v. Perry, where the song "Joyful Noise" was allegedly plagiarized by Katy Perry's "Dark Horse"
  - Three Boys Music v. Bolton
  - Rice v. Fox Broadcasting Co.
