= Lau Noah =

Spanish musician and composer

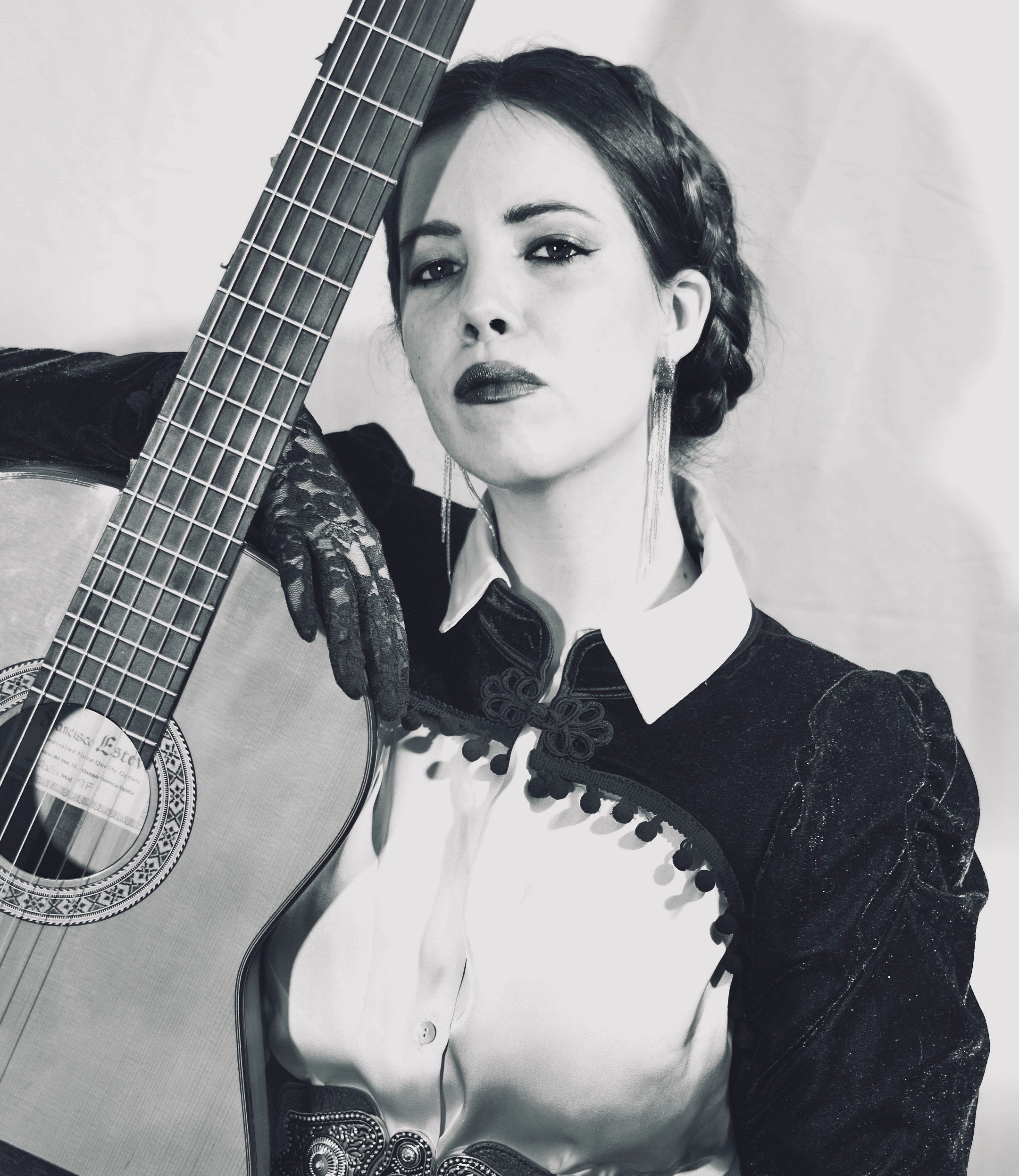

Background information
- Born: February 11, 1994 (age 32); Reus, Spain
- Genres: Folk, classical, jazz, Spanish folklore
- Occupations: Musician, composer
- Instruments: Guitar, vocals, piano
- Years active: 2014–present
- Website: https://www.launoahmusic.com

Lau Noah (born February 11, 1994) is a Spanish singer, instrumentalist, and composer. She is known for her musical approach combining singing and contrapuntal guitar playing, with the Recording Academy describing her as "a musical polymath." She was the first Catalan artist to perform on NPR Music's Tiny Desk Concert series. Her first LP contains collaborations with artists such as Jacob Collier, Jorge Drexler, Chris Thile, and Cécile McLorin Salvant.

== Early life ==
Lau Noah was born in Reus, Catalonia, Spain. As a child, she studied basic solfège and, during her adolescence, played the pipe organ at church. She performed her original songs with just vocals and piano accompaniment in towns across Catalonia. She cites the soundtracks of Disney films as a significant early influence.

== Career ==
Noah began studying basic piano lessons at the Centre de Lectura de Reus and later at the Vila-seca Conservatori of Music, but quit by the age of 13, saying music conservatories were "not for her". At age 17, she moved to a musicians' residence in Begues, Baix Llobregat county, near Barcelona. Two years later, in 2013, she recorded an unreleased demo entitled Wolves. The recording marked her first experience with music production and included a collaboration with drummer Jorge Rossy.

At 19, Noah relocated to New York City after securing a nanny position through an online platform. She arrived with $100 and worked various jobs while performing regularly at local venues, including The Bitter End and Rockwood Music Hall. In February 2016, she began teaching herself to play the guitar.

In the following years, Noah started posting performances of her guitar compositions to Facebook. These videos caught the attention of musicians such as pianist Larry Goldings, who organized a private performance for Noah in his Los Angeles home. The event was attended by artists that included Jesse Carmichael of Maroon 5 and producer Blake Mills.

In February 2019, Noah performed a solo set for NPR's Tiny Desk Concert. Billboard wrote about the performance. Bob Boilen, the creator of the series, said: "There's a magical aura that surrounds Lau Noah. She writes these thought-provoking song-stories that captured my heart."

Later that year, according to Metropolis Ensemble, Lau Noah worked on television projects including Little Voice (Apple TV).

During the COVID pandemic of 2020, Lau was noticed by musicians including Jacob Collier, Gavin Degraw, Phoebe Bridgers, and Moses Sumney. In the same year, she composed several songs for a short film The Sleeping Life of Sofia.

Lau self-released her first EP, titled 3, in June 2021, a compilation of songs for guitar and voice.

In July 2021, Noah was invited to perform with Jacob Collier at the Blue Note in NYC. Later that year, Noah performed a solo tour in Spain, France, Germany, and Switzerland. In 2022, Lau performed alongside pop star Gavin Degraw at Bethel Woods, the site of the 1969 Woodstock festival.

Lau went on tour with Chris Thile in the fall of 2022, opening his shows in Europe and, in early 2023, opened for the American band Nickel Creek in the UK.

On 19 May 2023, Noah released “If a Tree Falls in Love with a River,” a duet with Jacob Collier.

In the fall of 2023, she opened for Ben Folds in the UK, performing at the Royal Albert Hall in London and other notable venues. When the tour was suddenly cancelled because of Folds’ health issues, Noah took to social media and turned to her fans, who helped organize a headlining tour within three days, spanning over 10 dates in several locations in Ireland, Germany, France, the Netherlands, and Spain.

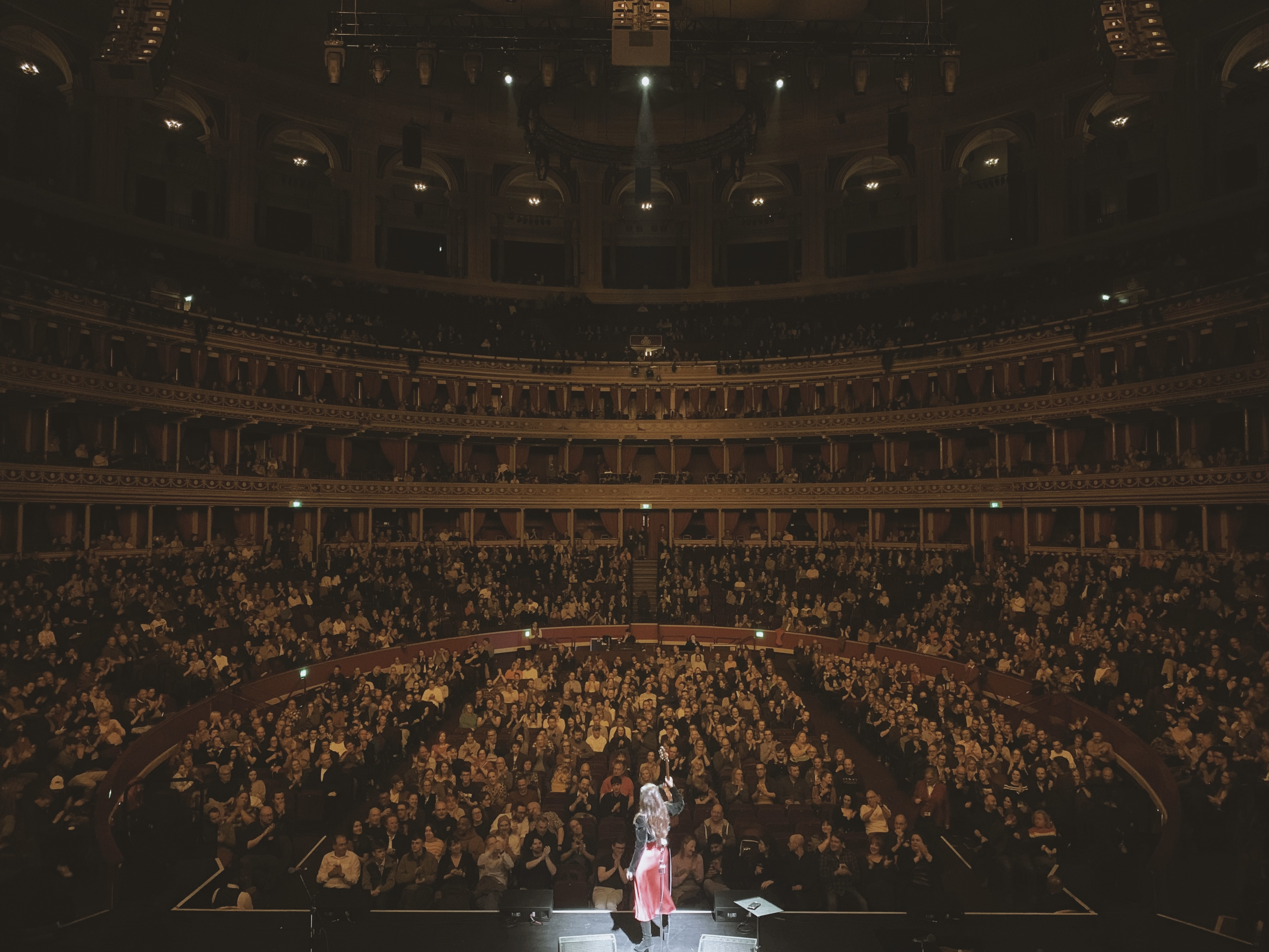
Lau Noah turning the audience into a choir at the Royal Albert Hall

Noah released her first LP, A Dos, on 12 January 2024, receiving positive coverage in the media, featuring Grammy winner Gaby Moreno, mandolinist Chris Thile, Goya awards winner Sílvia Pérez Cruz, Jacob Collier, flamenco singer Ángeles Toledano, ECM favourite Shai Maestro, Academy Award recipient Jorge Drexler, Eurovision winner Salvador Sobral, and Herbie Hancock Institute of Jazz first-prize winner Cécile McLorin Salvant.

Throughout January and February 2024, Noah was on the cover of Performer Magazine and was featured in music publications and podcasts including NPR's New Sounds, WBGO's Third Story podcast and Recording Academy's Global Spin. The user-based website Album of the Year rated Noah's duet with Collier 100%, and the full record a rating of 86%.

In March 2024, Noah became a finalist in the American Songwriter song contest.

Jamie Cullum spoke about Noah's record and played it on his BBC radio show in March 2024.

Noah has spoken about creativity at Ivy League universities including Brown University and various music festivals and conservatories (Cork international guitar festival 2019, Connecticut Guitar festival 2018, St Louis Classical guitar conservatory 2020, Escuela Superior de Música Creativa de Madrid 2020, Taller de Música de Barcelona 2024).

In the fall of 2024 Lau opened for Jacob Collier around Europe.

On June 13, 2025, Noah released a duo record with bass player and YouTube personality Adam Neely.

== Discography ==
- 3 - Lau Noah (2021)
- A Dos - Lau Noah (2024)
- The Way Under - Adam Neely & Lau Noah (2025)
