= Milan Smith =

American judge (born 1942)

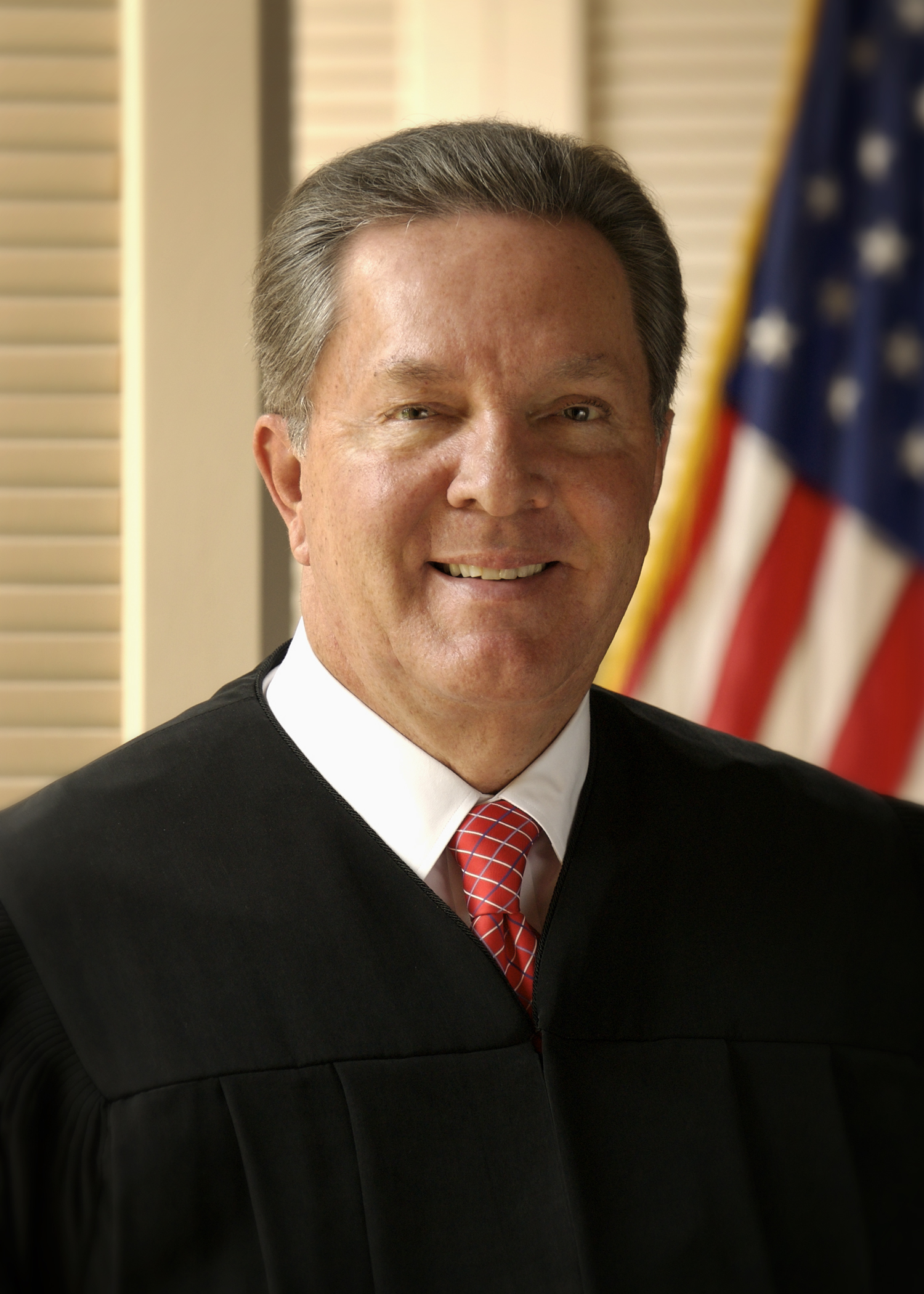
- Smith in 2015

Judge of the United States Court of Appeals for the Ninth Circuit
- Incumbent
- Assumed office May 18, 2006
- Appointed by: George W. Bush
- Preceded by: A. Wallace Tashima

Personal details
- Born: Milan Dale Smith Jr. 1942 (age 83–84) Pendleton, Oregon, U.S.
- Relatives: Gordon H. Smith (brother)
- Education: Brigham Young University (BA); University of Chicago (JD)

Milan Dale Smith Jr. (born 1942) is an American attorney and jurist serving as a United States circuit judge of the United States Court of Appeals for the Ninth Circuit. Smith's brother, Gordon H. Smith, was a Republican U.S. Senator from 1997 to 2009. Milan Smith is neither a Republican nor a Democrat, and he considers himself to be a political independent. Smith is married to Kathleen Denise Crane, a trust and estates attorney.

== Early life and education ==
Smith was born in Pendleton, Oregon. He is the son of Milan D. Smith, Sr., who served as chief of staff of the Department of Agriculture under Secretary Ezra Taft Benson. Smith received a Bachelor of Arts degree from Brigham Young University in 1966. Smith attended the University of Chicago Law School on a full-tuition scholarship, graduating in 1969 with a J.D. degree.

== Career ==
After law school, Smith became an associate attorney at the Los Angeles firm of O'Melveny & Myers. In 1972, Smith left O'Melveny to co-found his own law firm, Smith & Hilbig, which eventually became Smith, Crane, Robinson & Parker. He was a President-General Counsel of the Los Angeles State Building Authority from 1983 to 2006. Smith was a Vice Chairman of the California Fair Employment and Housing Commission from 1987 to 1991.

=== Federal judicial service ===
Smith was nominated by President George W. Bush on February 14, 2006, to fill a seat vacated by Judge A. Wallace Tashima. The Standing Committee on the Federal Judiciary of the American Bar Association rated him "well qualified," the highest possible rating. He was confirmed just over three months later by the United States Senate on May 16, 2006, by a 93–0 vote. He was the fifth judge appointed to the Ninth Circuit by Bush, and the first since Carlos Bea was confirmed in 2003. He received his commission on May 18, 2006.

In 2022, Smith told the Deseret News that he has no plans to retire and wishes to "die with my boots on."

== Notable cases ==
Smith has been one of the Ninth Circuit's most prolific writers. According to one periodical, he authored the most majority opinions of any judge on the Ninth Circuit in the three-year period ending on May 10, 2013.

=== First Amendment ===
- United States v. Alvarez, 617 F.3d 1198 (9th Cir. 2010). Smith wrote the majority opinion, which struck down the Stolen Valor Act of 2005. The panel ruled 2 to 1 that the law violated the First Amendment. "The right to speak and write whatever one chooses—including, to some degree, worthless, offensive and demonstrable untruths—without cowering in fear of a powerful government is, in our view, an essential component of the protection afforded by the First Amendment," Smith wrote in the majority opinion. The U.S. Supreme Court affirmed the judgment in a 6–3 decision.
- Comite de Jornaleros v. City of Redondo Beach, 657 F.3d 936 (9th Cir. 2011). Smith, writing for the majority of an 11-judge en banc panel, concluded that an ordinance of the City of Redondo Beach, California, that barred day laborers from soliciting work from occupants of motor vehicles violated the Free Speech Clause of the First Amendment.
- Protectmarriage.com-Yes on 8 v. Bowen, 752 F.3d 827 (9th Cir. 2014). Smith, writing for a divided panel, rejected an effort by contributors to California's anti-gay marriage ballot measure, Proposition 8, to shield their identities from disclosure. The opinion rejected a Free Speech Clause challenge to the California requirement that committees report donations made before the election but after the pre-election reporting deadline, and that certain other aspects of the donors' challenges were either moot or not ripe because the information the donors sought to keep confidential had already been published across the internet.
- Kennedy v. Bremerton School District, 869 F.3d 813 (9th Cir. 2017). Writing on behalf of an undivided panel, Smith held that a high school football coach spoke as a public employee when he would kneel and pray on the 50-yard line immediately after games, in full school apparel, while in view of students and parents. Because the coach's demonstrative conduct was made in his capacity as a public employee, the school did not illegally retaliate against him when the school ordered the coach not to speak in the manner that he did. Smith also noted that the school district's action was justified in order to avoid violating the Establishment Clause. The 9th circuit denied en banc on July 19, 2021, with Smith writing a concurring opinion. Certiorari was granted in the case on January 14, 2022. The U.S. Supreme Court reversed the judgment in a 6–3 decision. In her dissent, Justice Sonia Sotomayor echoed Smith's observation that the coach's argument that he only wanted to conduct his own private prayer while seeking no attention from his players or the public was flatly contradicted by the facts in the record.
- Herring Networks, Inc. v. Maddow, 8 F.4th 1148 (9th Cir. 2021). Smith dismissed a defamation lawsuit against Rachel Maddow. He ruled that Maddow's words that OAN “really literally is paid Russian propaganda" could not amount to defamation and that her speech is protected by the First Amendment.
- Tucson v. City of Seattle, 91 F.4th 1318 (9th Cir. 2024). Smith wrote the majority opinion, which reversed the district court’s order preliminarily enjoining the City of Seattle from enforcing its anti-graffiti ordinance. Writing for an undivided panel, Smith criticized the district court for enjoining the ordinance as overbroad without acknowledging “the numerous applications of the ordinance that would not implicate any protected speech, such as spray-painting an individual’s private home, vehicle, or other private property, or chalking messages on an individual’s private driveway.” The Seattle Times characterized the ruling as “a victory for Seattle City Attorney Ann Davison, who made public disorder and specifically graffiti crackdowns central to her campaign two years ago.”
- NetChoice v. Bonta, 113 F.4th 1101 (9th Cir. 2024). Writing for a unanimous panel, Smith partially upheld and partially vacated a preliminary injunction issued by Judge Beth Labson Freeman that had previously blocked the enforcement of California's Age-Appropriate Design Code Act ("CAADCA"). Smith agreed with Judge Freeman that the CAADCA likely violated the First Amendment insofar as it required online companies to assess and report on potential content-related harms to children. However, Smith vacated the rest of the district court's injunction, finding that it was unclear whether the other provisions of the CAADCA, such as those related to default privacy settings and the prohibition of using children's data in harmful ways, also violated the First Amendment.
- Hunter v. U.S. Dep't of Educ., 115 F.4th 955 (9th Cir. 2024). Writing for an undivided panel, Smith affirmed a lower court's dismissal of a constitutional challenge to Title IX's exemption for sex-based discrimination at religious post-secondary institutions that receive federal funding. Smith held that Congress, “within its constitutional boundaries,” adequately balanced the interests of religious freedom and gender-based equality, both of which are protected under the American Constitution.
- X Corp. v. Bonta, 116 F.4th 888 (9th Cir. 2024). Smith, writing for a unanimous panel, blocked the state of California from enforcing a law that requires large social media platforms to report how they moderate especially controversial categories of speech, finding that certain provisions of the law violate the First Amendment.

=== Second Amendment ===
- United States v. Henry, 688 F.3d 637 (9th Cir. 2012). Smith, writing for a unanimous three-judge panel, upheld a conviction for the possession of a homemade machine gun. Rejecting the defendant's Second Amendment claim based on District of Columbia v. Heller, 554 U.S. 570 (2008), Smith wrote that machine guns are "dangerous and unusual weapons" that are not "typically possessed by law-abiding citizens for lawful purposes," and that their possession is not protected by the Second Amendment.
- United States v. Duarte (9th Cir. 2024). Smith dissented from the majority opinion, which held that the felon-in-possession statute, 18 U.S.C. § 922(g)(1), violates the Second Amendment as applied to non-violent offenders who have served their time in prison and reentered society. Smith urged the court to rehear the case en banc.

=== Fourth Amendment ===
- Estate of Lopez v. Gelhaus, 871 F.3d 998 (9th Cir. 2017). Smith authored the majority opinion affirming the denial of summary judgment based on qualified immunity, where a deputy sheriff fatally shot a 13-year-old boy. Viewing the facts in the light most favorable to the plaintiffs, the panel concluded that the deputy deployed deadly force within seconds after exiting his vehicle while the boy was walking in the opposite direction on an adjacent sidewalk, holding what appeared to be a gun pointed at the ground, without warning about the amount of force that would be used, and without observing any aggressive behavior by the boy. Because the boy did not pose an immediate threat to law enforcement officials or anyone else, the law clearly established that the deputy's conduct was unconstitutional and the deputy was not entitled to qualified immunity. The U.S. Supreme Court later denied cert.
- Snitko v. United States, 90 F.4th 1250 (9th Cir. 2024). Writing for a unanimous panel, Smith rebuked the FBI for its March 2021 raid on US Private Vaults in Beverly Hills, California, in which it seized over 700 safe deposit boxes and attempted to civilly forfeit each box's contents. Smith also wrote a separate concurrence indicating his view that the inventory search doctrine should categorically not extend to searches of safe deposit boxes in a locked vault. Many observers celebrated the ruling as a crucial win for individuals' Fourth Amendment rights.

=== Environmental law ===
- Karuk Tribe of California v. U.S. Forest Service, 681 F.3d 1006 (9th Cir. 2012). Smith dissented from an en banc decision of the court holding that a federal agency's decision to refrain from acting triggered the Endangered Species Act's interagency consultation process. The dissent began with a reproduction of a woodcut and excerpt from Jonathan Swift's Gulliver's Travels, depicting and describing the eponymous traveler's capture by the Lilliputians—an unusual sight in the Federal Reporter.
- Cottonwood Env't L. Ctr. v. Edwards, 86 F.4th 1255 (9th Cir. 2023). Writing for an undivided panel, Smith held that the passage of pollutants through natural groundwater before reaching navigable waters necessarily triggered application of the Supreme Court's "functional equivalent" test from its decision in Cnty. of Maui, Hawaii v. Hawaii Wildlife Fund, 140 S. Ct. 1462 (2020).

=== Intellectual property ===
- Williams v. Gaye, 885 F.3d 1150 (9th Cir. 2018). Smith wrote the majority opinion for a divided panel, which upheld a jury verdict finding that the 2013 song "Blurred Lines" infringed on Marvin Gaye's estate's copyright to the 1977 song "Got To Give It Up." The decision rested on narrow grounds based on the procedural posture of the case.
- Gray v. Hudson, 28 F.4th 87 (9th Cir. 2022). Writing for a unanimous panel, Smith wrote an opinion upholding the district court's decision to overturn a $2.78 million award in a copyright lawsuit against the singer Katy Perry and several other defendants. In the lawsuit, the plaintiffs alleged that Perry's song "Dark Horse" impermissibly copied an ostinato (i.e., repeated musical figure) from their song "Joyful Noise." Smith agreed with the district court that the plaintiffs failed to show that Perry or her co-defendants had copied elements of "Joyful Noise" that were sufficiently original to be protectable under copyright law, stating: "The portion of the 'Joyful Noise' ostinato that overlaps with the 'Dark Horse' ostinato consists of a manifestly conventional arrangement of musical building blocks. Allowing a copyright over this material would essentially amount to allowing an improper monopoly over two-note pitch sequences or even the minor scale itself." Smith's opinion did not comment on other issues decided by the district court, concluding that it was unnecessary to "reach any other issue in this case." Smith's ruling was recognized within the legal community as one of the most important copyright decisions of 2022.

=== Labor, employment, and antitrust ===
- Tibble v. Edison International, 843 F.3d 1187 (9th Cir. 2016). On remand from the U.S. Supreme Court, Smith authored an opinion on behalf of a unanimous en banc panel that vacated the district court's judgment in favor of an employer and its benefits plan administrator on claims of breach of fiduciary duty in the selection and retention of certain mutual funds for a benefit plan governed by ERISA. Smith reasoned that federal law imposes on fiduciaries an ongoing duty to monitor investments, even absent a change in circumstances. Looking to the law of trusts, the duty of prudence requires fiduciaries to reevaluate investments periodically and to take into account their power to obtain favorable investment products, particularly when those products were substantially identical—other than their lower cost—to products they had already selected.
- In re Nat'l Collegiate Athletic Ass'n Athletic Grant-in-Aid Cap Antitrust Litig., 958 F.3d 1239 (9th Cir. 2020). Smith authored a concurring opinion in which he largely joined the majority's finding that rules implemented by the National Collegiate Athletic Association capping the amount of grant-in-aid that student-athletes are permitted to receive from their school as part of an athletic scholarship was in violation of antitrust law as an illegal restraint of trade. Smith wrote separately to argue that the majority's use of cross-market analysis to assign a procompetitive benefit to benefit of the NCAA's amateurism restrictions in developing a separate and distinct market for amateur college sports was against the legislative purpose of the Sherman Antitrust Act. Writing that the treatment of student-athletes "is the result of a cartel of buyers acting in concert to artificially depress the price that sellers could otherwise receive for their services"—exactly the "sort of distortion" that the antitrust laws were designed to prohibit—Smith argued that the majority's analysis "seems to erode the very protections a Sherman Act plaintiff has the right to enforce" by limiting the extent of the relief afforded to student-athletes despite their being "quite clearly deprived of the fair value of their services." After the case was appealed to the U.S. Supreme Court, Justice Brett Kavanaugh shared the same concerns as Smith, stating that antitrust laws "should not be a cover for exploitation of the student athletes."
- Epic Games, Inc. v. Apple, Inc., 67 F.4th 946 (9th Cir. 2023). Smith authored the majority opinion, which affirmed the district court’s conclusion that Apple’s App Store anti-steering rules violated California’s Unfair Competition Law and upheld the nationwide injunction against those rules. The panel also affirmed the district court’s conclusion that Epic had failed to provide sufficient evidence showing that Apple’s prohibition on app distribution outside of the App Store and its related requirement that developers exclusively use Apple’s In-App Purchase payment system for purchases within an app violate federal antitrust laws. The U.S. Supreme Court later denied cert.

=== Other notable cases ===
- United States v. California, 921 F.3d 865 (9th Cir. 2019). Smith, writing for a unanimous panel, largely upheld a district court's denial of the federal government's motion to enjoin California's sanctuary state laws, including SB 54, the California Values Act. The panel mostly rejected the government's intergovernmental immunity and preemption arguments, concluding instead that the Tenth Amendment's anticommandeering doctrine precluded the government's attempt to force state and local officials to assist with immigration enforcement efforts. The panel concluded: "SB 54 may well frustrate the federal government's immigration enforcement efforts. However, whatever the wisdom of the underlying policy adopted by California, that frustration is permissible, because California has the right, pursuant to the anticommandeering rule, to refrain from assisting with federal efforts." The U.S. Supreme Court later denied cert.
- State of California v. Azar (9th Cir. 2020). On February 24, 2020, Smith was in a 7-4 majority that upheld a gag rule that prohibited funding to programs that included abortion in family planning.
- McGill v. Shinn, 16 F.4th 666 (9th Cir. 2021). Smith dissented when the Ninth Circuit permitted Arizona to execute someone despite the fact that Arizona's death penalty statute at the time was declared unconstitutional by the U.S. Supreme Court in Ring v. Arizona. Although Arizona updated its death penalty statute afterwards, Smith argued that the execution violates the ex post facto clause.
- United States v. Idaho (9th Cir. 2023). On November 13, 2023, Smith was in a different 7-4 majority that temporarily blocked Idaho's abortion ban due to its lack of exceptions for medical emergencies. On January 5, 2024, the Supreme Court said it would take up the case and dissolved the 9th circuit's temporary injunction. The Supreme Court dissolved the stay, reinstating the injunction in Moyle v. United States on June 27, 2024. On December 10, 2024, the same 11-judge panel heard oral arguments for a merits ruling.
- State of Washington v. Trump (9th Cir. 2025). On February 19, 2025, Smith was one of three judges to reject the Trump administration's attempt to end birthright citizenship.

== Selected publications ==
- Milan D. Smith, Jr. (2020). "Only Where Justified: Toward Limits and Explanatory Requirements for Nationwide Injunctions". Notre Dame Law Review. 95: 2013–2038.
- Milan D. Smith, Jr. (2016). "A Blast From the Past: The Public Trust Doctrine and Its Growing Threat to Water Rights". Environmental Law. 46: 461–480.

== See also ==
- Udall family
- Lee-Hamblin family

Legal offices
Preceded by A. Wallace Tashima	Judge of the United States Court of Appeals for the Ninth Circuit; 2006–present	Incumbent
