= List of songs subject to plagiarism disputes =

The following is a list of songs that have been the subject of plagiarism disputes. In several of the disputes the artists have stated that the copying of melody or chord progression was unintentional. In some cases the song was sampled or covered. Some cases are still awaiting litigation.

== Songs subject to plagiarism disputes ==
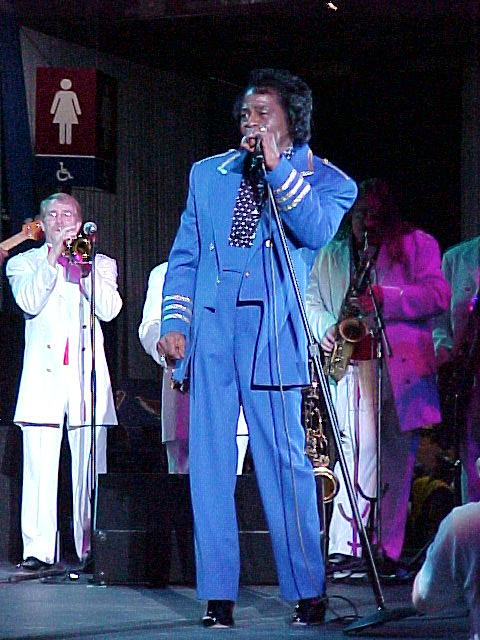
James Brown settled one dispute.

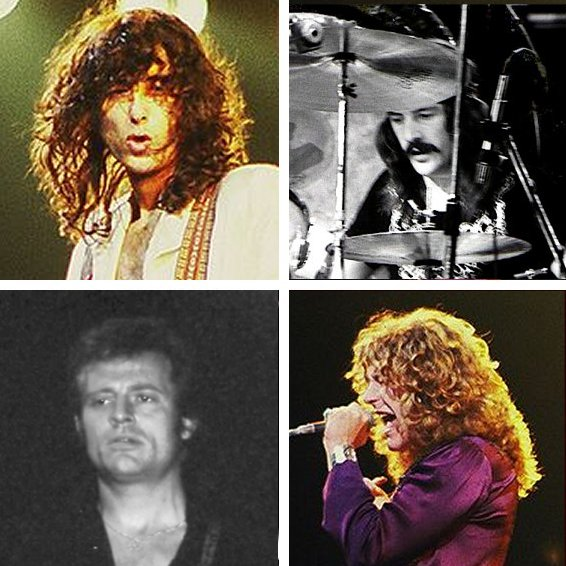
Led Zeppelin settled six disputes so far, and a seventh was decided in their favor.

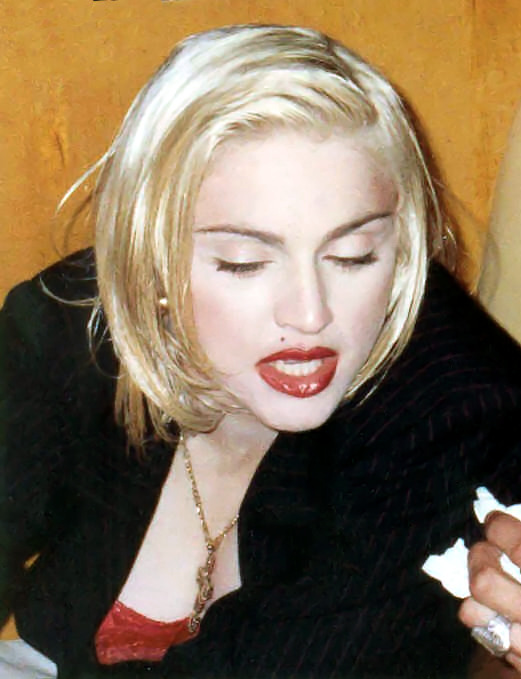
Madonna settled two plagiarism disputes.

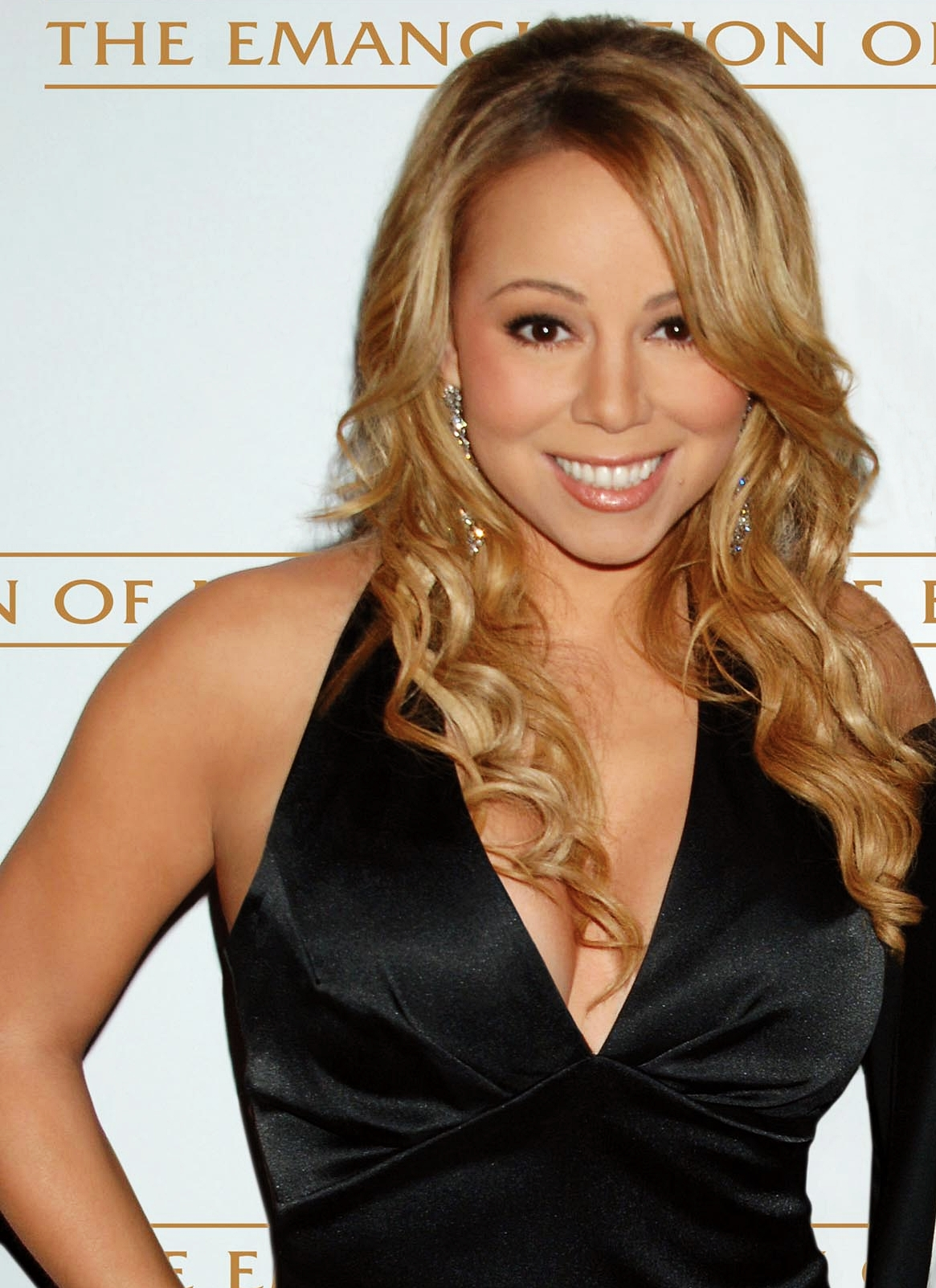
Mariah Carey settled three times.

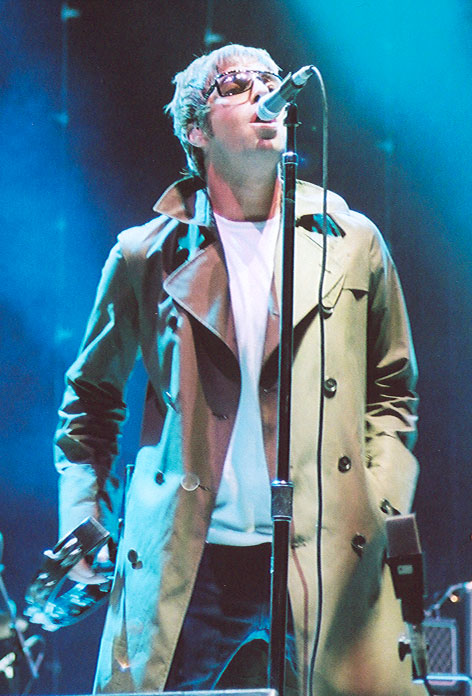
Oasis settled over three songs

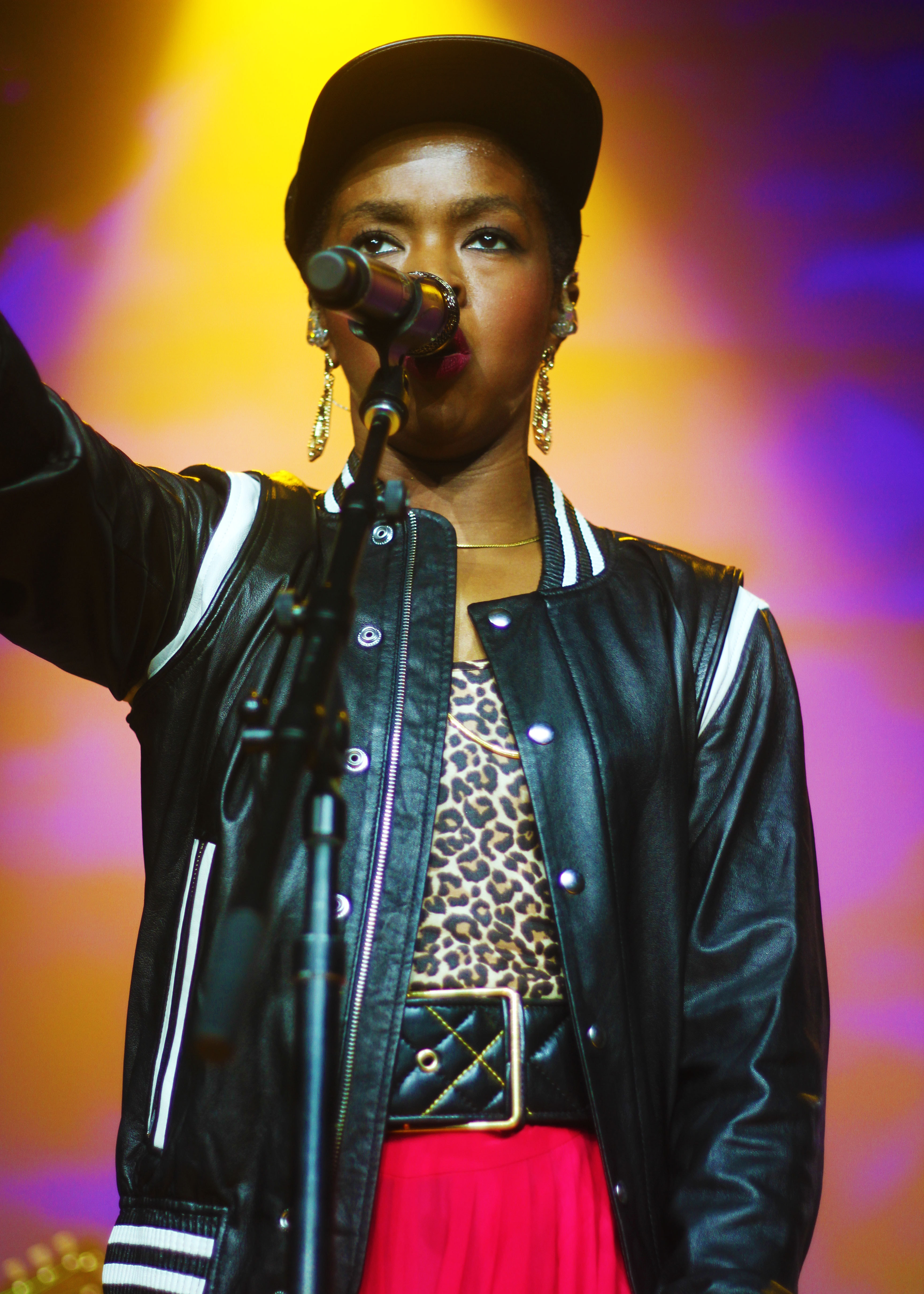
Lauryn Hill settled for a dispute over 13 tracks.

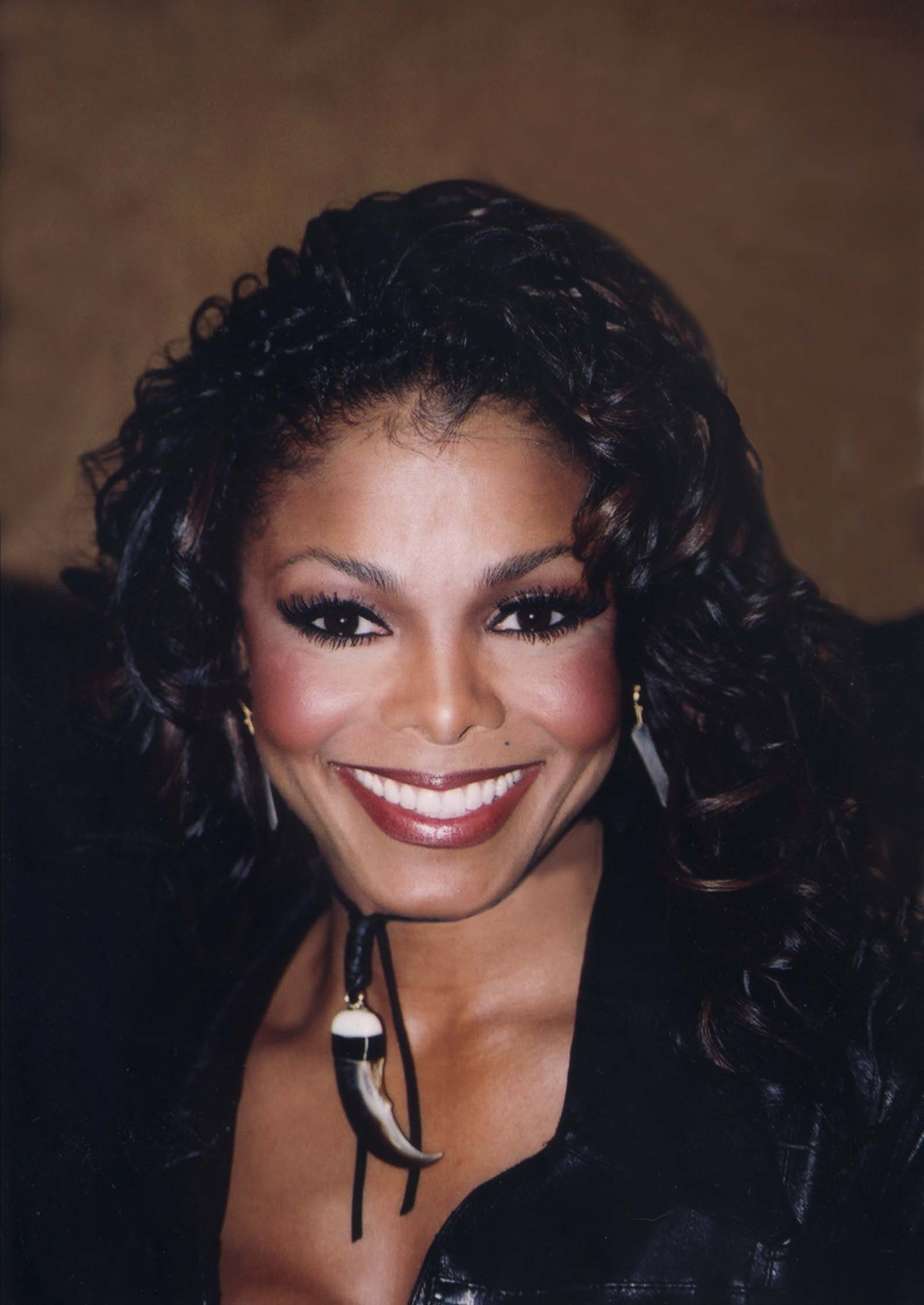
Janet Jackson settled once.

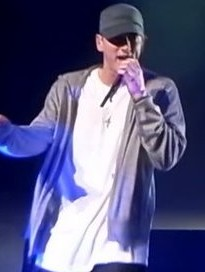
Eminem settled once.

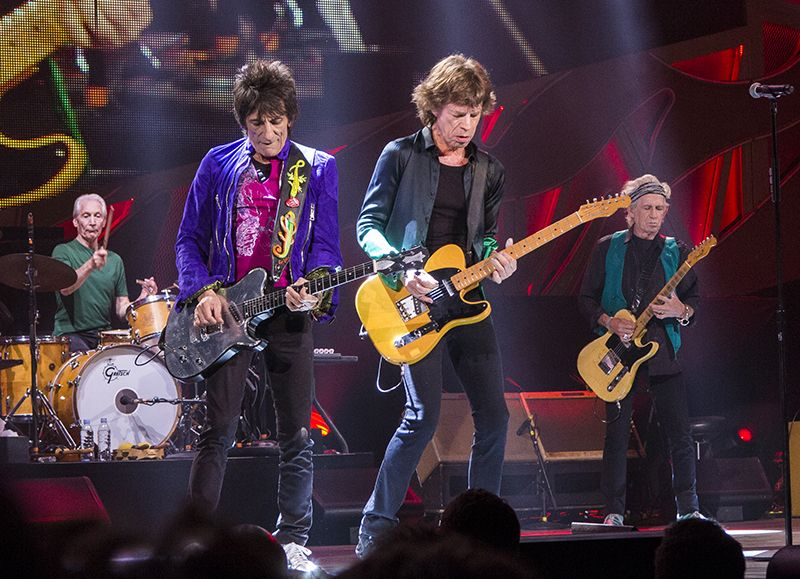
The Rolling Stones settled three disputes and were also claimants in two plagiarism disputes.

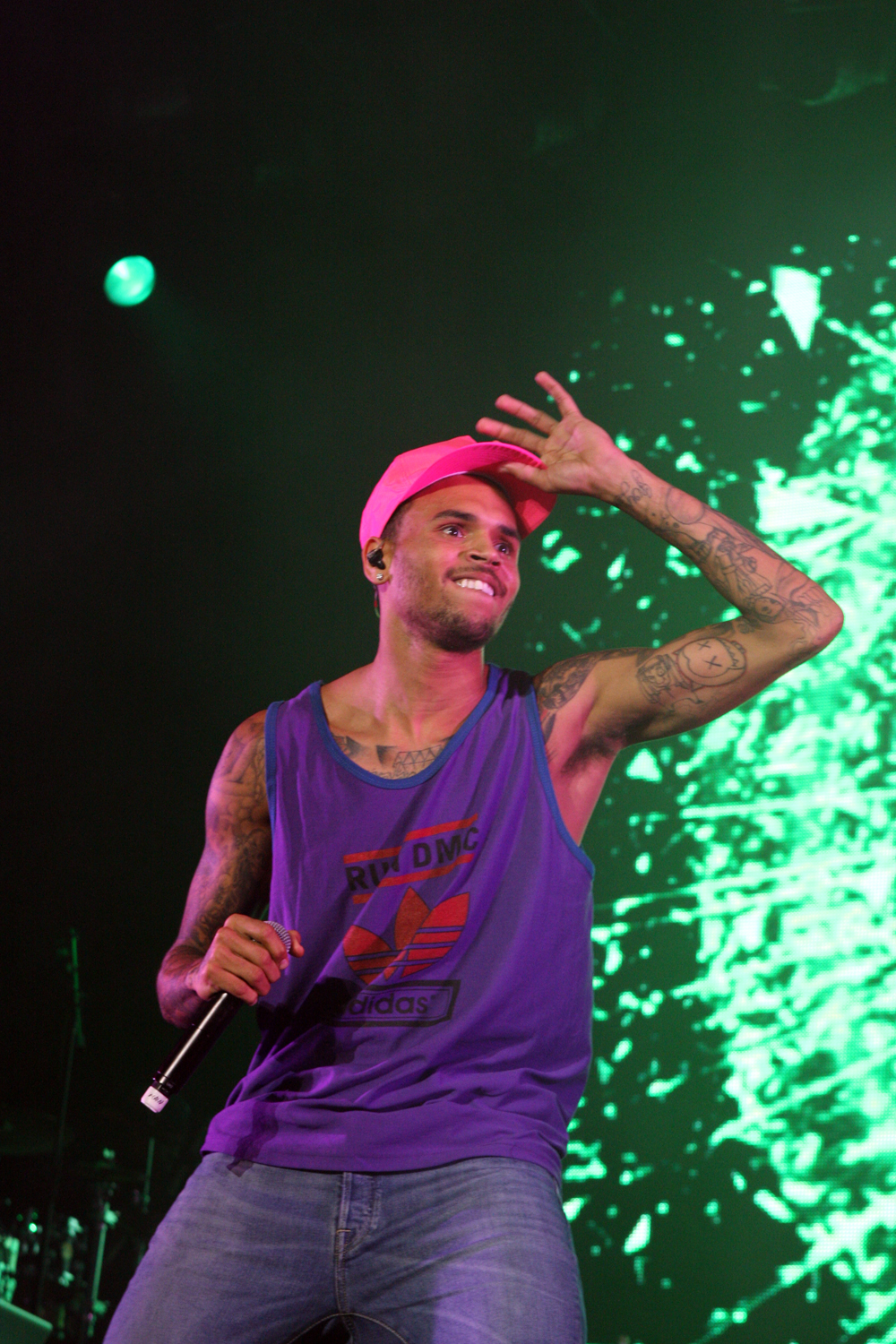
Chris Brown settled one dispute.

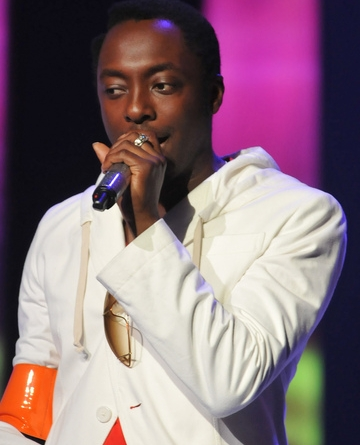
Will.i.am settled five disputes.

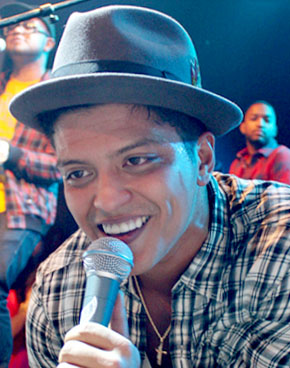
Bruno Mars had two cases dismissed, settled four disputes and was also claimant in one plagiarism dispute.

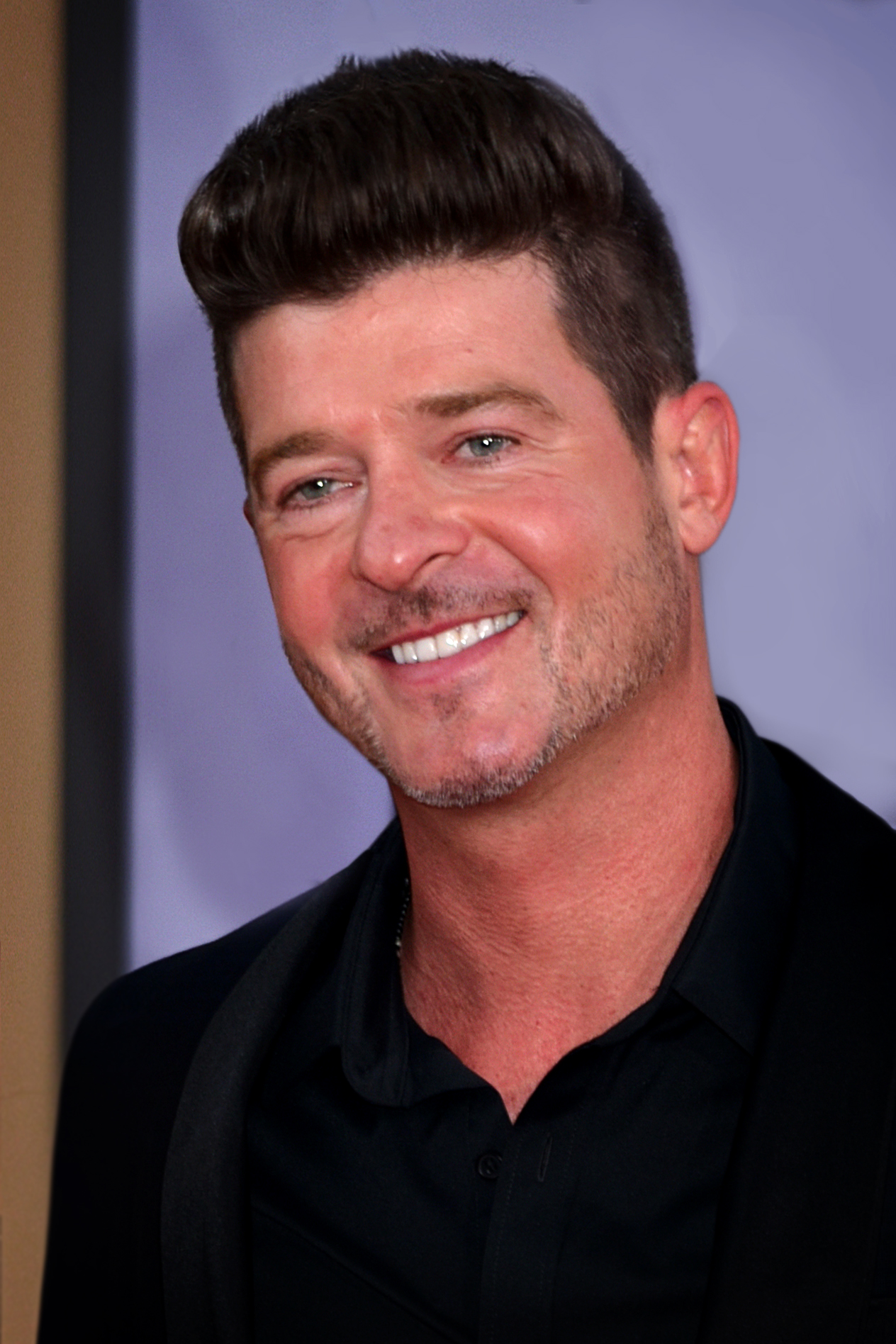
Robin Thicke settled one dispute.

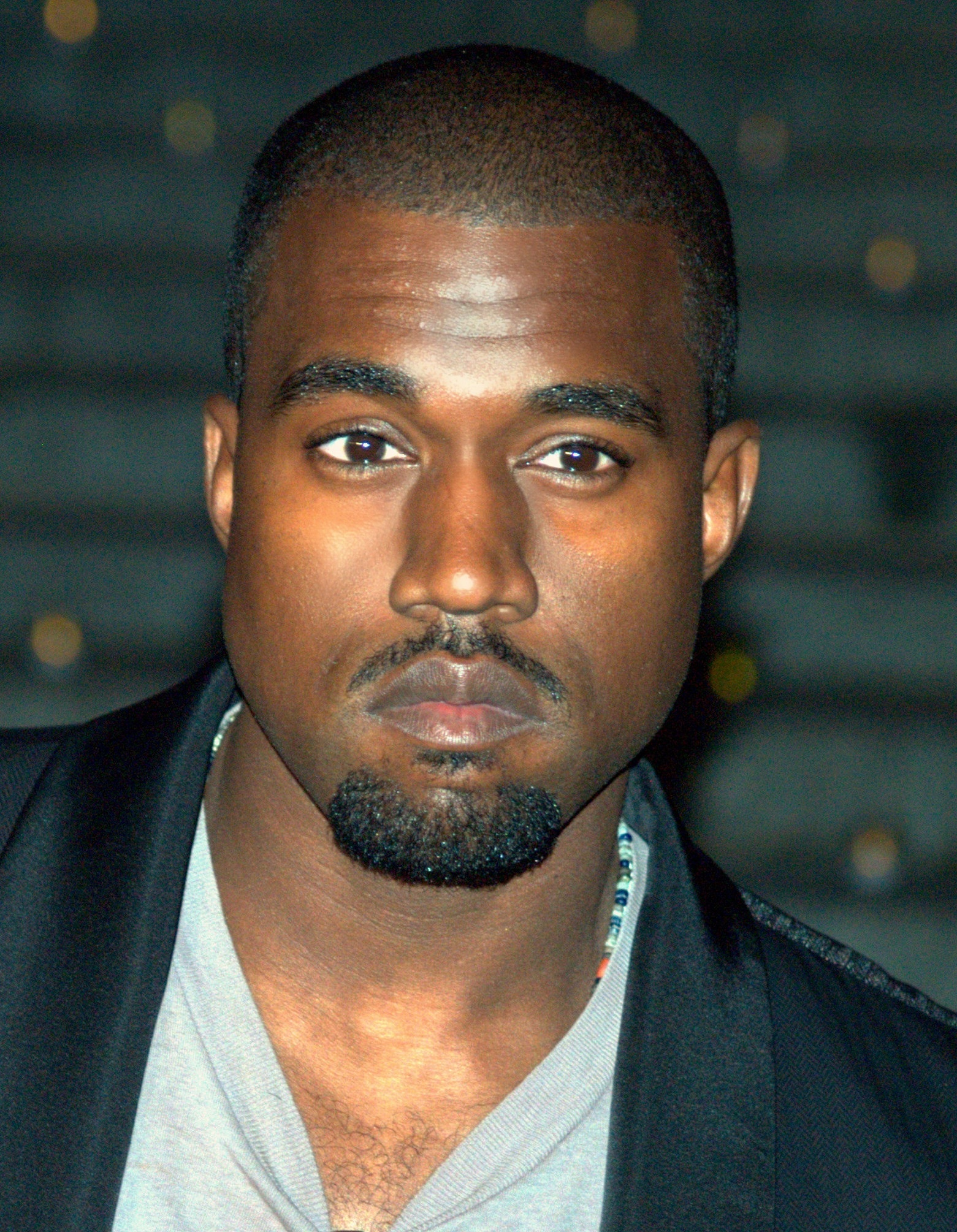
Kanye West settled three times.

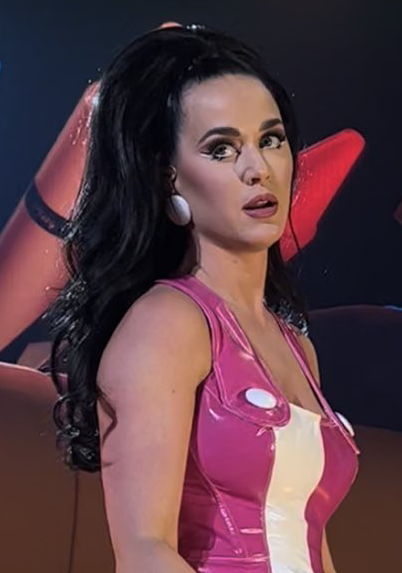
Katy Perry

Year	Original work	Original artist	Second song	Second artist	Result	Ref.
1965	"Ask Any Girl"	The Supremes	"1-2-3" (1965)	Len Barry	15% of the song's writing and publishing royalties	
1966	"It's a Man's World (But What Would He Do Without a Woman)"	Betty Jean Newsome	"It's a Man's Man's Man's World" (1966)	James Brown	Copyright of the song and a third of the royalties	
1966	"Sweet Little Sixteen"	Chuck Berry	"Surfin' U.S.A." (1963)	The Beach Boys	Songwriting credit, copyright having already been assigned to Berry via Arc Music	
1967	"In the Mood"	Glenn Miller	"All You Need Is Love" (1967)	The Beatles	Royalties	
1968	"All Day and All of the Night" (1964)	The Kinks	"Hello, I Love You" (1968)	The Doors	Settled	
1969	"You Can't Catch Me" (1956)	Chuck Berry	"Come Together" (1969)	The Beatles	Settled out of court in 1973, with John Lennon agreeing to compensate by recording three of the publisher's songs for his next album	
1971	"He's So Fine" (1963)	Ronnie Mack	"My Sweet Lord" (1970)	George Harrison	$1,599,987 to Bright Tunes; subsequently reduced to $587,000	
1971	"Feuilles Mortes" (1949)	Joseph Kozma	"La Maritza"	Sylvie Vartan	The totality of the song royalties were confiscated and went to Joseph Kozma heirs	
1972	"Bring It on Home" (1963)	Sonny Boy Williamson II	"Bring It on Home" (1969)	Led Zeppelin	Songwriting credit	
1973	"Speedy Gonzales" (1962)	Pat Boone	"Crocodile Rock" (1972)	Elton John	Settled	
1976	"Lonely Night" (1974)	Status Quo	"Am I Ever Gonna See Your Face Again" (1976)	The Angels	Settled out of court for royalties	
1978	Various Lennon–McCartney compositions (1963–1970)	The Beatles	"Cheese and Onions", "Piggy in the Middle" and other songs on The Rutles (1978)	The Rutles	Royalties and songwriting credits	
1979	"Taj Mahal" (1972)	Jorge Ben Jor	"Da Ya Think I'm Sexy?" (1978)	Rod Stewart	Settled out of court, donated profits to UNICEF	
1979	"Good Times" (1979)	Chic	"Rapper's Delight" (1979)	The Sugarhill Gang	Undisclosed settlement and songwriting credits	
1970s	"Killing Floor" (1964)	Howlin' Wolf	"The Lemon Song" (1969)	Led Zeppelin	Songwriting credit	
1970s	"Crescent City Blues" (1953)	Gordon Jenkins	"Folsom Prison Blues" (1955)	Johnny Cash	$75,000	
1983	Unnamed	Linden Hudson	"Thug" (1983)	ZZ Top	Undisclosed amount	
1984	"I Want a New Drug" (1983)	Huey Lewis and the News	"Ghostbusters" (1984)	Ray Parker Jr.	Settled non-disclosure agreement	
1985	"Pour toi" (1957)	Louis "Loulou" Gasté	"Feelings" (1976)	Morris Albert	$500,000	
1985	"You Need Love" (1963)	Muddy Waters	"Whole Lotta Love" (1969)	Led Zeppelin	Settled out of court for undisclosed amount	
1985	"Sugar Don't Bite" (1984)	Sam Harris	"Papa Don't Preach" (1986)	Madonna	Undisclosed amount	
1986	Unnamed	Los Lobos	"All Around the World or the Myth of Fingerprints" (1986)	Paul Simon	Undisclosed	
1987	“If You Could Read My Mind" (1970)	Gordon Lightfoot	“The Greatest Love of All" (1977)	George Benson	Settled out of court; Lightfoot withdrew the lawsuit feeling it had a negative impact on Whitney Houston, who covered the song in 1985	
1988	"Just Another Night"	Patrick Alley	"Just Another Night" (1985)	Mick Jagger	Six-person jury decided in Jagger's favor in April 1988	
1988	"Run Through the Jungle" (1970)	Creedence Clearwater Revival	"The Old Man Down the Road" (1984)	John Fogerty	Six-person jury decided in Fogerty's favor in November 1988	
1989	"You Showed Me" (1968)	The Turtles	"Transmitting Live from Mars" (1989)	De La Soul	$1.7 million	
1989	"Love Sensation" (1980)	Loleatta Holloway	"Ride on Time" (1989)	Black Box	Sample used without permission; song reissued with new vocal	
1990	"Llorando se fue" (1981)	Los Kjarkas	"Lambada" (1989)	Kaoma	Songwriting credit	
1990	"Chorando Se Foi" (1986)	Márcia Ferreira	"Lambada" (1989)	Kaoma	Songwriting credit	
1990	"Babe I'm Gonna Leave You"	Anne Bredon	"Babe I'm Gonna Leave You" (1969)	Led Zeppelin	Songwriting credit	
1990	"I'm a Roadrunner" (1966)	Junior Walker and the All-Stars	"Roll with It" (1988)	Steve Winwood	Songwriting credit	
1990	"Super Freak" (1981)	Rick James	"U Can’t Touch This" (1990)	MC Hammer	Songwriting credit, 50% of royalties	
1991	"Leaving on a Jet Plane" (1966)	John Denver	"Run 2" (1989)	New Order	Songwriting credit	
1991	"Best of My Love" (1977)	Maurice White	"Emotions" (1991)	Mariah Carey	Undisclosed amount	
1991	"Eighties" (1985)	Killing Joke	"Come as You Are" (1991)	Nirvana	No lawsuit	
1992	"I Want to Thank You"	Kevin McCord	"Make It Happen" (1992)	Mariah Carey	$500,000	
1992	"Right Before My Eyes"	Sharon Taber and Ron Gonzalez	"Can't Let Go" (1991)	Mariah Carey	Settled for $1 million	
1993	"(I'd Do) Anything for You" (1989)	Jon Dunmore Sinclair	"I'd Do Anything for Love" (1993)	Meat Loaf	Undisclosed settlement	
1993	"Under Pressure" (1981)	Queen and David Bowie	"Ice Ice Baby" (1990)	Vanilla Ice	Undisclosed amount and songwriting credit	
1993	"Al Yawm Ulliqa Alal Khashaba" (1962)	Fairuz	"Erotica" (1992)	Madonna	$2.5 million	
1993	"The Air That I Breathe" (1972)	Albert Hammond and Mike Hazlewood	"Creep" (1992)	Radiohead	Songwriting credits and royalties	
1994	"How Sweet to Be an Idiot" (1973)	Neil Innes	"Whatever" (1994)	Oasis	Songwriting credit	
1994	"Love Is a Wonderful Thing" (1964)	The Isley Brothers	"Love Is a Wonderful Thing" (1991)	Michael Bolton	Under the Ninth Circuit ruling, the Isleys were to be paid $4.2 million	
1994	"I'd Like to Teach the World to Sing (In Perfect Harmony)" (1971)	The New Seekers	"Shakermaker" (1994)	Oasis	$500,000	
1995	"So Get Up" (1992)	Ithaka	"So Get Up" (1995)	Underground Sound of Lisbon	Unresolved dispute, regarding 19 remixes and 2 A cappella versions released by USL with allegedly no performance payment or credit to vocalist Ithaka Darin Pappas (also the lyricist)	
1996	"Uptight (Everything's Alright)" (1965)	Stevie Wonder	"Step Out"	Oasis	Songwriting credit	
1996	"Within You Without You" (1967)	The Beatles	"Indus"	Dead Can Dance	Songwriting credit	
1996	"Hero" (1990)	Christopher Selletti	"Hero" (1993)	Mariah Carey	Case dismissed; Selletti ordered to pay fines.	
1996	"Be Your Own Hero" (1991)	Rhonda Dimmie	"Hero" (1993)	Mariah Carey	Case dismissed	
1997	"Every Breath You Take" (1983)	The Police	"I'll Be Missing You" (1997)	P Diddy	100% of the publishing royalties	
1997	"Constant Craving" (1992)	k.d. lang	"Anybody Seen My Baby?" (1997)	The Rolling Stones	Songwriting credit	
1998	Unnamed tracks	New Ark	13 tracks on the album The Miseducation of Lauryn Hill (1998)	Lauryn Hill	Undisclosed settlement	
1998	"I'm Eighteen" (1970)	Alice Cooper	"Dreamin'" (1998)	Kiss	Undisclosed settlement	
1998	"Feel So High" (1991)	Des'Ree	"Got 'til It's Gone" (1997)	Janet Jackson	Settled out of court with an estimated amount of $2.6 million	
1999	"The Last Time" (1965)	The Rolling Stones	"Bitter Sweet Symphony" (1997)	The Verve	Songwriting credits and 100% of royalties; returned to the Verve in 2019	
1999	"Metal on Metal" (1977)	Kraftwerk	"Nur Mir" (1997)	Sabrina Setlur	Ruled in favor of Kraftwerk	
2000	"Love in Vain" (1939)	Robert Johnson	"Love in Vain" (1969)	The Rolling Stones	Settled	
2000	"Stop Breakin' Down Blues" (1937)	Robert Johnson	"Stop Breakin' Down" (1972)	The Rolling Stones	Settled	
2002	"Pulsion" (1979)	Jacques Loussier	"Kill You" (2000)	Eminem	Settled	
2003	"Father and Son" (1970)	Cat Stevens	"Fight Test" (2003)	The Flaming Lips	75% of the song royalties.	
2003	"My Life Is in Your Hands" (1994)	Kathy Troccoli	"My Life Is in Your Hands" (2001)	Jamie Rivera	Alternating lyrics, misspelled songwriting credits, and uncrediting of the song's publishers.	
2006	"Mbube" (1920)	Solomon Linda	"The Lion Sleeps Tonight" (1961)	Disney's usage of the Tokens' song on the movie The Lion King	Back royalties and songwriting credits	
2007	"If We Could Start All Over" (1993)	Eddy and Danny van Passel	"You Are Not Alone" (1995)	Michael Jackson	Condemnation for plagiarism of its solo writer R. Kelly	
2007	"Acidjazzed Evening" (2001)	Janne "Tempest" Suni	"Do It" (2007)	Nelly Furtado (prod. Timbaland)	Settled out of court for an undisclosed sum	
2007	"Around the World" (1997)	Daft Punk	"I Got It from My Mama Remix" (2007)	will.i.am	Denial of sample clearance, leading to the cancellation of the remix's official release	
2008	"Taj Mahal" (1969)	Jorge Ben Jor	"Da Ya Think I'm Sexy?" (1978)	Rod Stewart	Settled	
2008	"Play with Fire" (1965)	The Rolling Stones	"Playing with Fire" (2008)	Lil Wayne	Settled	
2008	"I Wanna Be Your Boyfriend" (1979)	The Rubinoos	"Girlfriend" (2007)	Avril Lavigne	Undisclosed settlement	
2008	"Jealous Again" (1990)	The Black Crowes	"Work Hard, Play Harder" (2008)	Gretchen Wilson	Songwriting credit	
2009	"I Was Made for Lovin' You" (1979)	Kiss	"Outlaw Pete" (2009)	Bruce Springsteen	Kiss did not pursue legal action out of respect for Springsteen.	
2009	"Mancry" (2009)	Adam Freeland	"Party All the Time" (2009)	The Black Eyed Peas	Settled	
2009	"If I Could Fly" (2004)	Joe Satriani	"Viva la Vida" (2008)	Coldplay	Case dismissed	
2009	"Wherever You Are" and "A Strangely Isolated Place"	Ulrich Schnauss	"Riad N' the Bedouins" (2008)	Guns N' Roses	Undisclosed	
2010	"I'm Not Alone" (2009)	Calvin Harris	"Yeah 3x" (2010)	Chris Brown	Songwriting credit	
2010	"Kookaburra" (1932)	Marion Sinclair	"Down Under" (1980)	Men at Work	5% of royalties backdated to 2002	
2011	"I Need a Freak" (1983)	DJ Lynn Tolliver	"My Humps" (2005)	The Black Eyed Peas	$1.2 million and 75% songwriting credits	
2011	"Where Are You Now" (2004)	Anthony Stokes	"Maxine's Interlude" (2006)	John Legend	Settled for an undisclosed amount	
2012	"Dazed and Confused" (1967)	Jake Holmes	"Dazed and Confused" (1969)	Led Zeppelin	Undisclosed settlement out of court	
2012	"Baby I'm Yours" (2010)	Breakbot	"Treasure" (2012)	Bruno Mars	Songwriting credits	
2013	"Got to Give It Up" (1977)	Marvin Gaye	"Blurred Lines" (2013)	Robin Thicke	$5.3 million and songwriting credits	
2014	"Playaz Club" (1994)	Rappin' 4-Tay	"Who Do You Love" (2014)	Drake	$100,000	
2014	Frisky Vol. 1 to 30 (Tapes) (2000)	Demetrius Proctor	"Billionaire" (2011)	Travie McCoy, Bruno Mars	Case dismissed	
2015	"I Won't Back Down" (1989)	Tom Petty	"Stay With Me" (2014)	Sam Smith	12.5% songwriting credit	
2015	"Mulheres" (1996)	Toninho Geraes	"Million Years Ago" (2015)	Adele	A Brazilian court ruled that Adele had to cease publication of "Million Years Ago". The decision was later overturned on appeal.	
2015	"Takin' Me to Paradise" (1983)	Bruno Bergonzi and Michele Vicino	"The Most Beautiful Girl in the World" (1994)	Prince	Songwriting credits and compensation for moral rights	
2015	The Machine film score (2013)	Tom Raybould	"The Hills" (2015)	The Weeknd	Undisclosed settlement	
2015	"Oops Up Side Your Head" (1979)	The Gap Band	"Uptown Funk" (2014)	Mark Ronson, Bruno Mars	17% royalties and songwriting credit	
2016	"Young Girls" (1983)	Collage	"Uptown Funk" (2014)	Mark Ronson, Bruno Mars	Undisclosed settlement	
2016	"Taurus" (1968)	Spirit	"Stairway to Heaven" (1971)	Led Zeppelin	Appeals court found that "Stairway to Heaven" was not plagiarized	
2016	"Les chansons d'artistes" (2001)	Les années Boum	"Si seulement je pouvais lui manquer" (2004)	Calogero	€80,000	
2016	"Don't You Want to Stay"	Bill Withers	"I Do This"	Kendrick Lamar	Litigated, Not settled	
2016	"Ring the Bell" (2014)	Casey Dienel	"Sorry" (2015)	Justin Bieber	Ruled in favor of Bieber	
2016	“I Remember” (2008)	deadmau5 and Kaskade	“Antarctica” (2016)	$uicideboy$	Undisclosed settlement in 2021, included songwriting credits.	
2017	"Amazing" (2011)	Matt Cardle	"Photograph" (2015)	Ed Sheeran	Privately settled in April 2017	
2017	"Gyöngyhajú lány" (1969)	Gábor Presser	"New Slaves" (2013)	Kanye West	Undisclosed settlement	
2017	"More Bounce to the Ounce" (1980)	Zapp	"Uptown Funk" (2014)	Mark Ronson, Bruno Mars	Undisclosed settlement	
2017	"Funk You Up" (1979)	The Sequence	"Uptown Funk" (2014)	Mark Ronson, Bruno Mars	Case dismissed	
2017	"Playas Gon' Play" (2001)	3LW	"Shake It Off" (2014)	Taylor Swift	Case dismissed	
2017	"No Scrubs" (1999)	TLC	"Shape of You" (2017)	Ed Sheeran	Negotiations to clear an interpolation started before "Shape of You" was released but not finalized until afterwards. Songwriting credits & royalties	
2018	"Oh Why" (2015)	Sami Switch	"Shape of You" (2017)	Ed Sheeran	Ruled in favor of Ed Sheeran	
2018	"Hooyo" (2009)	Yasmin Mohamed	"Starboy" (2016)	The Weeknd	Litigated; not settled	
2018	"Seven Nation Army" (2003)	The White Stripes	"Toy" (2018)	Netta Barzilai	Songwriting credits and royalties	
2018	"When I Found You" (2015)	Jasmine Rae	"The Rest of Our Life" (2017)	Tim McGraw and Faith Hill	Undisclosed settlement	
2018	"I Don't Give a Fuck"	Tulisa	"Scream & Shout" (2012)	will.i.am and Britney Spears	Songwriting credits and 10% royalties	
2018	"Let's Get It On" (1973)	Marvin Gaye	"Thinking Out Loud" (2014)	Ed Sheeran	Ruled in favor of Sheeran.	
2018	"The Man Who Can't Be Moved" (2008)	The Script	"Say You Won't Let Go" (2016)	James Arthur	Settled, with Danny O'Donoghue and Mark Sheehan, the writers of "The Man Who Can't Be Moved", each receiving a co-writing credit for "Say You Won't Let Go".	
2019	"Work This Pussy" (1989)	Junior Vasquez	"WTP" (2018)	Teyana Taylor	Settled between Vasquez and Kanye West who wrote the song	
2019	"Joyful Noise" (2008)	Flame	"Dark Horse" (2013)	Katy Perry	$2.78 million and songwriting credits. However, in March 2020, a judge reversed the jury's $2.78 million award and decision. (See Gray v. Perry.)	
2019	"Carry On" (1982)	Bobby Caldwell	"Carry On" (2019)	Lil Nas X	Litigated; not settled	
2019	"Broad Day" (2019)	Brandon Lee	"Rodeo" (2019)	Cardi B and Lil Nas X	Litigated, not settled	
2019	"Creep" (1992)	Radiohead	"Get Free" (2017)	Lana Del Rey	Undisclosed settlement	
2019	"Holly Wood Died" (2006)	Yellowcard	"Lucid Dreams" (2018)	Juice Wrld	Yellowcard dropped its lawsuit against Juice Wrld after his death. However, the band could still refile the lawsuit if it changed its mind.	
2020	"Sunrise" (2018)	Yeasayer	"Pray for Me" (2018)	The Weeknd and Kendrick Lamar	Litigated; Not settled	
2020	"Naked" (1996)	Louise Redknapp	"Peppa's Party Time" (2019)	Peppa Pig	Songwriting credits and royalties	
2020	"Baby Can I Hold You" (1988)	Tracy Chapman	"Sorry" (2018)	Nicki Minaj	$450,000	
2020	"Ice Drop" (2016)	DJ Lag	"Culture" (2020)	will.i.am	Undisclosed settlement	
2020	"Love Is in the Air" (1977)	John Paul Young	"Warm in the Winter" (2011)	Glass Candy	Litigated; not settled	
2021	"Made In America" (2016)	Kidd Wes	"This Is America" (2018)	Childish Gambino	Not settled	
2021	"Goin' Home" (1998)	Toto	"Anyone" (2021)	Justin Bieber	Not settled	
2021	"Misery Business" (2007)	Paramore	"Good 4 U" (2021)	Olivia Rodrigo	Songwriting credits	
2021	"Pump It Up" (1978)	Elvis Costello	"Brutal" (2021)	Olivia Rodrigo	Costello never took any action against Rodrigo.	
2022	"Live Your Life" (2017)	Artikal Sound System	"Levitating" (2020)	Dua Lipa	Cases dismissed.	
2022	"Wiggle and Giggle All Night" (1979)	Dr. Buzzard's Original Savannah Band	"Levitating" (2020)	Dua Lipa	Cases dismissed.	
2022	"Dancing with Strangers" (2017)	Jordan Vincent	"Dancing with a Stranger" (2019)	Sam Smith and Normani	Case dismissed	
2022	"Get Ur Freak On" (2001)	Missy Elliott	"Safaera" (2020)	Bad Bunny, Jowell & Randy and Ñengo Flow	25% royalties	
2022	"Thank You" (2000)	Dido	"Mi Bebito Fiu Fiu" (2022)	Tito Silva Music	Sample used without permission, which led Silva to remove the song from streaming services after it went viral to avoid legal issues	
2022	"Stan" (2000)	Eminem	"Mi Bebito Fiu Fiu" (2022)	Tito Silva Music	Sample used without permission, which led Silva to remove the song from streaming services after it went viral to avoid legal issues	
2022	"El Hueso de Mi Perra" (2012)	Little Key and Son de AK	"Gatita" (2022)	Bellakath	Not settled	
2024	"Trouble Is a Friend" (2008)	Lenka	"Selos" (2023)	Shaira	Songwriting credit	
2024	"Scatman (Ski-Ba-Bop-Ba-Dop-Bop)" (1994)	Scatman John	"Bailar Contigo" (2022)	Black Eyed Peas and Daddy Yankee	Not settled	
2024	"I Feel Love" (1977)	Donna Summer	"Good (Don't Die)" (2024)	¥$	Donna Summer's estate and Kanye West settled with West prohibited from using "Good (Don't Die)".	
2024	"When I Was Your Man" (2012)	Bruno Mars	"Flowers" (2023)	Miley Cyrus	Not settled	
2025	"I Want You" (1966)	Bob Dylan	"Bulles de savon" (2025)	Calogero	Not settled	

== See also ==
- Sampling (music)
- Music copyright
