= Peter Rauhofer =

Austrian-American DJ (1965–2013)

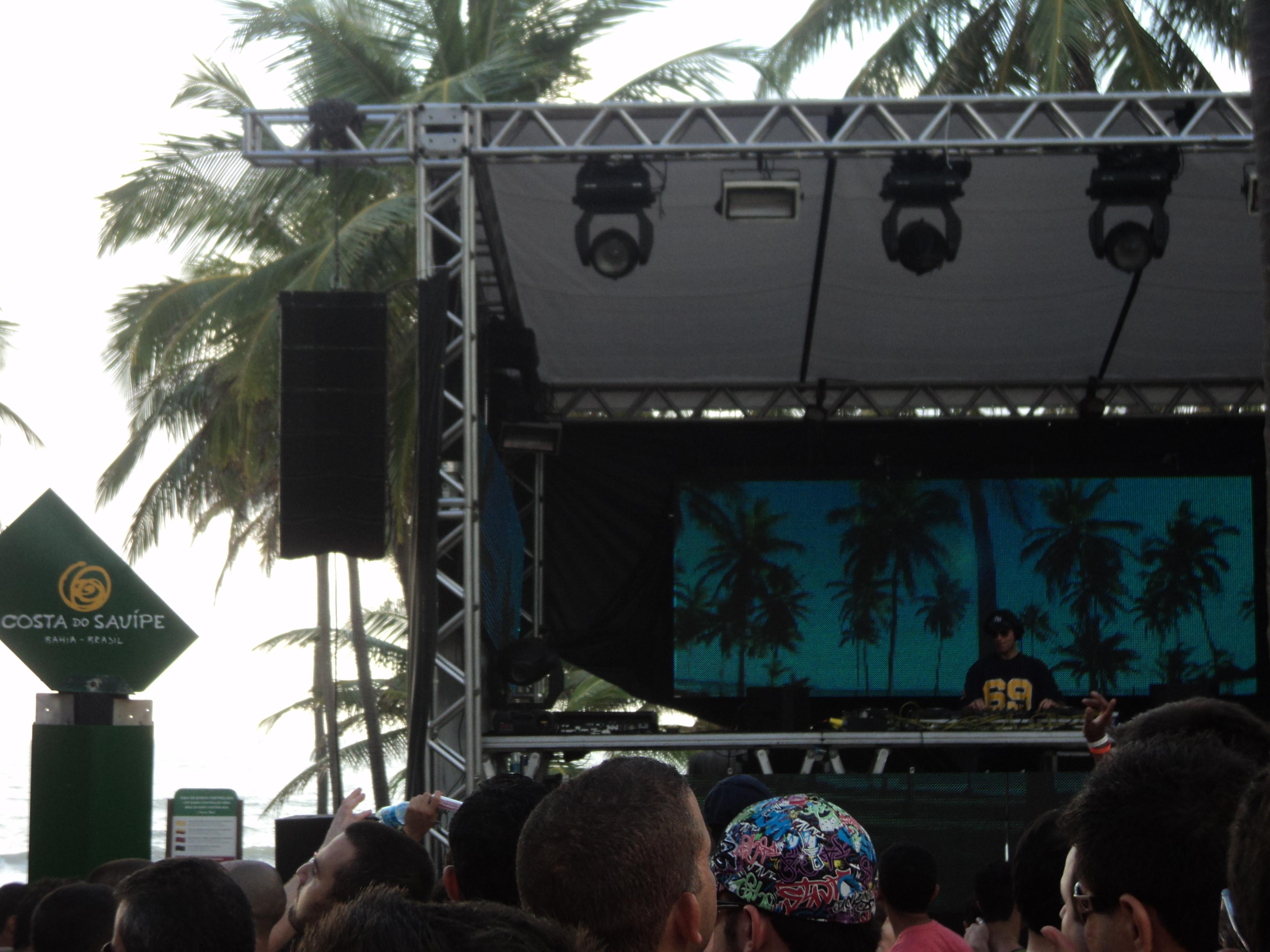
- Peter Rauhofer performing live at the Hell & Heaven in Brazil (2010).

Background information
- Also known as: Club 69; Size Queen
- Born: 29 April 1965; Vienna, Austria
- Origin: Vienna, Austria; New York City, New York, U.S.
- Died: 7 May 2013 (aged 48)
- Genres: Tribal house; progressive house
- Occupations: DJ; remixer; producer
- Instruments: Turntables; sampler

Peter Rauhofer (29 April 1965 – 7 May 2013) was an Austrian-American disc jockey (DJ), remixer and producer who formerly worked under the moniker Club 69 as well as Size Queen. A native of Vienna, Austria, he was famous for a variety of his remixes including Cher's "Believe" and a number of Madonna's songs including "Nothing Really Matters", "American Life", "Nothing Fails", "Nobody Knows Me", "Get Together", "Impressive Instant" and "4 Minutes", as well as her collaboration with Britney Spears, "Me Against the Music" and various collaborations with Janet Jackson ("Throb" and "Just a Little While" to name a few). He has also provided remixes for Donna Summer, Kylie Minogue, Whitney Houston, Jessica Simpson, Britney Spears, Christina Aguilera, Yoko Ono, Pink, Tori Amos, Pet Shop Boys, Depeche Mode, Yazoo, Frankie Goes to Hollywood, Book of Love, Soft Cell, Duran Duran and Mariah Carey, among others. He was also behind the tribal house record label Star 69 and was a frequent producer of the label's releases.

== Career ==
Rauhofer was a popular DJ who spun throughout the United States. He was the former resident DJ at the weekly gay dance night held at the Roxy in New York, which closed its doors in 2007. Rauhofer was formerly the resident DJ of the gay dance party called "Work". His party was held weekly at the Stereo nightclub in New York until March 3, 2008, when the City invoked eminent domain and acquired the building. "Work" was a monthly event, despite lacking a permanent venue.

Rauhofer was mostly known for spinning tribal house and continued to play many gay circuit party events, and was scheduled to play the ultimate events (White Party Palm Springs and One Mighty Weekend's Magic Journeys at Arabian Nights) prior to his falling ill in February 2013.

Memorial services were held from coast to coast (including Miami and New York) and special events honoring Rauhofer continued into the summer of 2013.

Peter Rauhofer (under the moniker Club 69 with Georg O. Luksch) won the Grammy Award in 2000 for Best Remixer of the Year for his remixes of Madonna "Nothing Really Matters", Cher "Believe", Whitney Houston "It´s Not Right But It´s OK", Everything but the Girl "Five Fathoms", Donna Summer "I Will Go With You".

== The Collaboration ==
The Collaboration was a dance music project created by Rauhofer. Rauhofer's first release as The Collaboration was "Do It Properly", a 1999 track produced with Victor Calderone, featuring Deborah Cooper on vocals. The Collaboration moniker was then used by Rauhofer on "Break 4 Love", a no. 1 Hot Dance Music/Club Play hit featuring Pet Shop Boys, released in 2001.

== Death ==
On 17 April 2013, it was made public that Rauhofer was diagnosed with a brain tumor. A message was posted on his Facebook page by his friend and manager, Angelo Russo, informing friends and fans of the incident. On 7 May 2013, it was reported that Rauhofer had died. The cause was brain cancer.

== Remixes ==
- "4 Minutes" (Madonna and Justin Timberlake)
- "17 Again" (Eurythmics)
- "4th Of July" (Kelis)
- "A Thousand Beautiful Things" (Annie Lennox)
- "Ain't That a Lot of Love" (Simply Red)
- "All The Lovers" (Kylie Minogue)
- "Alright! Strobelight!" (Amtr@k Jrny)
- "American Life" (Madonna)
- "Apologize" (OneRepublic)
- "Appreciate Me" (Amuka)
- "Are You Ready For Love" (Elton John)
- "Aura Tribe" (Dan Q)
- "Automatic" (Laura Kidd)
- "Away" (Mantra feat. Lydia Rhodes)
- "Bad Romance" (Lady Gaga)
- "Beautiful" (Christina Aguilera)
- "Believe" (Cher)
- "Believe In Love" (Tom Stephan feat. Gerideau)
- "Benedictus" (Brainbug)
- "Big Love" (Suzanne Palmer)
- "Bucci Bag" (Andrea Doria)
- "Body" (Funky Green Dogs)
- "Boy" (Book Of Love)
- "Brand New Day" (Minds Of Men)
- "Break 4 Love" (The Collaboration + Pet Shop Boys)
- "Can't Get You Out Of My Head" (Kylie Minogue)
- "Comin' Back" (The Crystal Method)
- "Dance Naked" (Aaron Carl)
- "Dance To The Music" (Laszlo Panaflex)
- "Dark Beat" (Oscar G & Ralph Falcón)
- "Der Commissar" (Falco)
- "Diamonds" (Rihanna)
- "Discoteka" (Starkillers)
- "Din Da Da" (Kevin Aviance)
- "Do I Look Like A Slut?" (Avenue D)
- "Do Ya Think I'm Sexy" (Rod Stewart)
- "Don't Give Up" (Chicane)
- "Don't Stop the Music" (Rihanna)
- "Don't Want Another Man" (Dynamix feat. Tina Ann)
- "Don't You Worry Child" (Swedish House Mafia)
- "Don't You Forget About Me" (Simple Minds)
- "Eyes On You" (Tina)
- "Elements 2005" (Danny Tenaglia)
- "Everybody Wants To Rule The World" (Steven Lee & Granite Feat. Zander Bleck)
- "Fascinated" (Suzanne Palmer)
- "Feel Free" (Yves Deruyter)
- "Fire" (Alicia Keys)
- "Fire With Fire" (Scissor Sisters)
- "Fired Up!" (Funky Green Dogs)
- "Filthy Mind" (Amanda Ghost)
- "Fire with Fire" (Scissor Sisters)
- "Five Fathoms" (Everything But The Girl)
- "Flavor" (Tori Amos)
- "Found a Cure" (Ultra Nate)
- "Get A Job" (Gossip)
- "Get It Together" (Seal)
- "Get Together" (Madonna)
- "Gimme More" (Britney Spears)
- "Give Me Danger" (Dangerous Muse)
- "Got To Dance Disco" (H.O.G. Presents Groovlines)
- "Greatest Love of All" (Whitney Houston)
- "Hard" (Rihanna)
- "Heaven" (Nu Flavor)
- "He Wasn't Man Enough" (Toni Braxton)
- "Heart Attack" (Jahkey B feat. Satta)
- "Hell In Paradise" (Yoko Ono)
- "Hide U" (Suzanne Palmer)
- "Hold Your Head Up High" (Boris Dlugosch presents Booom!)
- "House On Fire" (Arkarna)
- "How Would You Feel" (David Morales)
- "Hurt Me So Bad" (Lulu)
- "I Didn't Know My Own Strength" (Whitney Houston)
- "I Don't Know What You Want But I Can't Give It Anymore" (Pet Shop Boys)
- "Impressive Instant" (Madonna)
- "I Feel Loved" (Depeche Mode)
- "I Heart You" (Toni Braxton)
- "I Like How It Feels" (Enrique Iglesias)
- "I Need Love" (Paul Main Project feat. Renee)
- "I Think I'm in Love with You" (Jessica Simpson)
- "It's No Good" (Depeche Mode)
- "It's Not Right, But It's Okay" (Whitney Houston)
- "I Try" (Made By Monkeys)
- "I Will Go with You (Con te partirò)" (Donna Summer)
- "Just a Little While" (Janet Jackson)
- "Keep It Coming" (Seven featuring Mona Monet)
- "Keep the Faith" (Suzanne Palmer)
- "Killer" (Seal)
- "Let The Music Use You Up" (Celeda)
- "Let's Have A Kiki" (Scissor Sisters)
- "Life Story" (Angie Stone)
- "Live In Unity" (Dangerous Minds)
- "Live It Up" (K-Klass)
- "Looking For Love" (Karen Ramirez)
- "Lose My Breath" (Destiny's Child)
- "Love Is The Message" (Saxmachine)
- "Love Of Life" (Yohan Square)
- "Love That Man" (Whitney Houston)
- "Love You Some More" (Cevin Fisher)
- "Love" (Kazaky)
- "Luv Drug" (Suzanne Palmer)
- "Magic Orgasm" (House Heroes)
- "Maneater" (Nelly Furtado)
- "Me Against the Music" (Britney Spears feat. Madonna)
- "Meet Her At The Love Parade" (Hans)
- "Million Dollar Bill" (Whitney Houston)
- "Miles Away" (Madonna)
- "Mother and Father" (Madonna)
- "Musica Electrica" (Alma Matris)
- "My Empire" (Lula)
- "My Imagination" (Ceevox)
- "My Urban Soul" (Urban Soul)
- "Nasty Girl" (Inaya Day)
- "Nightmare" (Brainbug)
- "Nobody Knows Me" (Madonna)
- "Nobody's Supposed To Be Here" (Deborah Cox)
- "Nothing Fails" (Madonna)
- "Nothing Really Matters" (Madonna)
- "Oh No" (Danny Tenaglia)
- "Only Girl (In The World)" (Rihanna)
- "Only The Horses" (Scissor Sisters)
- "Ooh La La" (Goldfrapp)
- "Open Your Mind" (Celeda)
- "Open Your Mind" (Celeda)
- "Paparazzi" (Lady Gaga)
- "Peace" (Depeche Mode)
- "Pearls" (Shady)
- "Perfect Love" (House Of Prince feat. Oezlem)
- "Play" (Jennifer Lopez)
- "Power Of Love" (Donna Summer)
- "Reach Up" (Celeda)
- "Relax" (Frankie Goes to Hollywood)
- "Release Me" (Industry)
- "Rise Up" (Funky Green Dogs)
- "Rolling in the Deep" (Adele)
- "Rollerblade" (Movin' Melodies)
- "Rude Boy" (Rihanna)
- "Por Causa Do Amor" (Zona)
- "Sax It Up" (Saxmachine)
- "Say It Right" (Nelly Furtado)
- "Say Somethin'" (Mariah Carey)
- "Scream & Shout" (will.i.am feat. Britney Spears)
- "Sexy Love" (Residence Deejays)
- "SexyBack" (Justin Timberlake feat. Timbaland)
- "Shake It" (Jark Prongo)
- "She Wolf" (Shakira)
- "Shout To The Top" (Fire Island feat. Loleatta Holloway)
- "Show Me" (Suzanne Palmer)
- "Sister Soul & Mr. Beat" (Beat 4 Feet feat. Kim Cooper)
- "Situation" (Yaz)
- "Skin" (Arkarna)
- "Skin" (Charlotte)
- "Skin" (Madonna)
- "Skyfall" (Adele)
- "Smalltown Boy" (Bronski Beat)
- "Somebody That I Used to Know" (Gotye)
- "Somebody's Baby" (Charlotte)
- "Some Lovin - (Queer as Folk)" (Kristine W)
- "Soulshaka" (Jan Driver)
- "Sound Of The Drum" (Suzanne Palmer)
- "Stand Up!" (Magic Cucumber)
- "Step Into My World" (Jennifer Lopez)
- "Story Of My Life" (Hidden Agenda feat. Kim Payton)
- "Strict Machine" (Goldfrapp)
- "Strong Enough" (Cher)
- "Sunchyme" (Dario G)
- "Suffer Well" (Depeche Mode)
- "Surreal" (Ayumi Hamasaki)
- "Tainted Love" (Soft Cell)
- "Take A Picture" (Filter)
- "Thank You Lord" (Connie Harvey)
- "That Sound" (Michael Moog)
- "The Consequences of Falling" (K.D. Lang)
- "The DJ, The Music & Me" (Lula)
- "The Future's Overrated" (Arkarna)
- "The Music" (K&S Project feat. Shelby)
- "The Return Of Nothing" (Sandstorm)
- "The Singing Saw" (House E Delic)
- "The Underground" (Celeda)
- "The World Is Mine" (David Guetta)
- "Throb" (Janet Jackson)
- "Till The World Ends" (Britney Spears)
- "Till Tonight" (Laidback Luke feat. Jonathan Mendelsohn)
- "Timebomb" (Kylie Minogue)
- "Toxic" (Britney Spears)
- "Try" (P!nk)
- "Turn It Up" (Paris Hilton)
- "Two Together" (Mimi)
- "Until The Day" (Funky Green Dogs)
- "Up & Down" (Vengaboys)
- "Upgrade U" (Beyoncé)
- "Walking On Thin Ice" (Yoko Ono)
- "We Belong Together" (Mariah Carey)
- "We Found Love" (Rihanna)
- "What About Us?" (Brandy)
- "What Happens Tomorrow" (Duran Duran)
- "What's So Funny" (Carlton)
- "Whateva" (Ralph Falcón feat. Alex K & Alan T.)
- "Who Am I" (Massiv)
- "Wrong" (Depeche Mode)
- "X99" (Junior Vasquez)
- "Yang Yang" (Yoko Ono)
- "You Can Run" (H2O feat. Billie)

== See also ==
- List of number-one dance hits (United States)
- List of artists who reached number one on the US Dance chart
