= Veronica Electronica =

Remix album by Madonna
- Released: July 25, 2025
- Recorded: 1997–1998
- Length: 42:16
- Labels: Maverick; Warner; Rhino
- Producers: Marius de Vries; Patrick Leonard; Madonna; William Orbit

Madonna chronology
Deadpool & Wolverine: Madonna's "Like a Prayer" EP (2024)	Veronica Electronica (2025)	Bedtime Stories: The Untold Chapter (2025)

Veronica Electronica is the fourth remix album by American singer-songwriter Madonna, released on July 25, 2025, through Warner Records. The album title comes from an alter ego, which Madonna created during the Ray of Light era in 1998.

== Background ==
Conceived by Madonna as a companion remix album to her seventh studio album Ray of Light (1998), Veronica Electronica was shelved at the time due to the ongoing commercial success of Ray of Light and its singles. Over the years, it became the subject of persistent fan speculation and rumors.

The album features rare and previously unreleased remixes by several of Madonna's collaborators from the Ray of Light era, including Peter Rauhofer, William Orbit, Sasha, BT, and Victor Calderone. While many of these remixes were originally released on singles, some have been newly edited or combined specifically for this album. It also includes "Gone Gone Gone", a previously unreleased demo recorded during the Ray of Light sessions with producer Rick Nowels.

On June 5, 2025, Madonna announced that the album would be released on July 25, 2025, on digital and streaming platforms, as well as in a limited-edition silver vinyl pressing. On the day of release, Madonna announced a further clear vinyl and CD release for October 10, 2025.

== Title and artwork ==
Throughout the original album's campaign, Madonna commented that Veronica Electronica is the nickname to the alter-ego she gave herself during the recording of the Ray of Light album. Additionally, the name is one of her chosen middle names, originating from her Catholic confirmation when she was a child and the Saint Veronica. During the album's promotion campaign, MTV journalist Kurt Loder interviewed Madonna and she stated that the alter-ego is medieval. According to spokesperson Liz Rosenberg, Madonna considered titling the original album Mantra, which she thought was a "really cool title", and she also considered calling it Veronica Electronica; however, she discarded both of those ideas and called it Ray of Light, as, aside from her debut LP, her studio albums up to that point were titled after one of the songs from each album's tracklist. Thematically, the first five edits were created after the idea of a trippy DJ set performed in an underground club, Veronica being a girl dancing to it with the music progressively putting her into a trance. The last three could be described as the after-hour segment you chill to before leaving the dance floor and going back to the real world.

On Instagram, Madonna stated that "Making my Ray of Light album was a seminal moment in my life as an artist. I was going through a huge metamorphosis. I had given birth to my daughter Lola. I had found my spiritual path and I was ready to shed a new skin and take a road less traveled. I ventured into electronic music with William Orbit and I created an alter ego, taking one of my middle names—and Veronica Electronica was born." Her statement continued, "Meet my other half." Photographs taken from a January 14, 1998, photoshoot by photography duo Inez and Vinoodh are used for the album's artwork.

== Promotion ==
On June 5, 2025, Madonna released the Peter & Victor's Collaboration Remix Edit for Ray of Light album track "Skin", followed by "Gone Gone Gone"—a previously unreleased original demo from the Ray of Light sessions—about a month later; "Gone Gone Gone" debuted at number 72 on the UK Singles Downloads Chart on July 18, 2025.

== Critical reception ==
Professional ratings
Aggregate scores
Source	Rating
Metacritic	63/100
Review scores
Source	Rating
AllMusic	3/5 stars
Beats Per Minute	62%
The Guardian	3/5 stars
The Irish Times	4/5 stars
The Line of Best Fit	7/10
musicOMH	4/5 stars
Pitchfork	5.9/10

Veronica Electronica was met with generally positive reviews. At Metacritic, which assigns a normalized rating out of 100 to reviews from mainstream publications, the album received an average score of 63, based on 7 reviews. Neil Z. Yeung from AllMusic called it "one of the more intriguing releases to come from the retrospective anniversary series that was rolled out into the 2020s". Shaad D'Souza from The Guardian commented it "is worth the price of admission". Mary Chiney of Beats Per Minute wrote: "It gives form to a forgotten chapter and lets a monumental era exhale one last time. In doing so, Madonna doesn't just honor the past, she releases it". Ed Power of The Irish Times opined: "It's a postcard from the edge of the rave era and an eloquent love letter to pop at its purest and most euphoric". Callum Foulds of The Line of Best Fit wrote: "Veronica Electronica may not add much to the already excellent era it comes from, but it certainly acts as a reminder to give the original another spin."

A less favorable review came from Pitchfork's Owen Myers. He pointed out releasing the widely available remixes instead of the songs Madonna mentioned in 1998. He commented that "Veronica Electronica doesn't know if it wants to dynamically reinvent the remixes of its day or present an authoritative survey of them. It winds up doing neither", adding it "promised to soar just as high, but it hardly gets off the ground."

== Commercial performance ==
Veronica Electronica charted in 16 countries. In the United Kingdom, Madonna earned her 26th top 40 album, peaking at number 23. The album also debuted and peaked at number one for two weeks on the UK Dance Albums Chart, and at number three on the UK Vinyl Albums Chart. The album is also Madonna's tenth entry on the Billboard Top Dance Albums chart, peaking at 23.

== Track listing ==
Veronica Electronica track listing
No.	Title	Writer(s)	Producer(s)	Length
1.	"Drowned World/Substitute for Love" (BT & Sasha's Bucklodge Ashram New Edit)	Anita Kerr; David Collins; Madonna; Rod McKuen; William Orbit	Madonna; Orbit; Brian Transeau^{[r]}^{[a]}; Sasha^{[r]}^{[a]}	5:21
2.	"Ray of Light" (Sasha Twilo Mix Edit)	Madonna; Orbit; Clive Maldoon; Dave Curtiss; Christine Leach	Madonna; Orbit; Sasha^{[r]}	5:42
3.	"Skin" (Peter & Victor's Collaboration Remix Edit)	Madonna; Patrick Leonard	Madonna; Marius de Vries; Orbit; Peter Rauhofer^{[r]}; Victor Calderone^{[r]}	5:19
4.	"Nothing Really Matters" (Club 69 Speed Mix Meets the Dub)	Madonna; Leonard	Madonna; De Vries; Orbit; Rauhofer^{[r]}^{[a]}	5:14
5.	"Sky Fits Heaven" (Victor Calderone Future New Edit)	Madonna; Leonard	Madonna; Leonard; Orbit; Calderone^{[r]}	5:20
6.	"Frozen" (Widescreen Mix and Drums)	Madonna; Leonard	Madonna; Leonard; Orbit^{[p]}	5:18
7.	"The Power of Good-Bye" (Fabien's Good God Mix Edit)	Madonna; Rick Nowels	Madonna; Leonard; Orbit; Fabien Waltmann^{[r]}	5:23
8.	"Gone Gone Gone" (Original Demo Version)	Madonna; Nowels		4:39
Total length:				42:16

Japanese bonus track
No.	Title	Writer(s)	Producer(s)	Length
9.	"Skin" (Peter & Victor's Collaboration Remix)	Madonna; Leonard	Madonna; Vries; Orbit; Rauhofer^{[r]}; Calderone^{[r]}	11:01
Total length:				53:17

=== Notes ===
- ^{^[p]} signifies a primary producer and remixer
- ^{^[a]} signifies an additional producer
- ^{^[r]} signifies a remixer

== Personnel ==
Credits adapted from the album's liner notes and Tidal.

- Madonna – vocals
- Dan Hersch – remix editing, mastering
- Bill Inglot – remix editing, mastering
- Fergus Gerrand – drums (track 1)
- Sasha – engineering (2)
- Pat McCarthy – engineering (2, 3)
- Marc Moreau – guitar (2)
- Matt Silva – engineering (3, 6)
- David Reitzas – engineering (3)
- Jon Englesby – engineering (3)
- Mark Endert – engineering (3)
- Ted Jensen – engineering (3)
- Georg O. Luksch – keyboards, programming (4)
- Craig Armstrong – strings arrangement (6)
- Patrick Leonard – additional arrangement (6)
- Mac Quayle – keyboards (6)
- Sean Spuehler – technician (6)
- Niven Garland – engineering (7)
- Johann Delebarre – creative direction
- Inez Van Lamsweerde – photography

== Charts ==
=== Weekly charts ===
Weekly chart performance
Chart (2025)	Peak position
Australian Albums (ARIA)	33
Austrian Albums (Ö3 Austria)	39
Belgian Albums (Ultratop Flanders)	8
Belgian Albums (Ultratop Wallonia)	28
Croatian International Albums (HDU)	1
Dutch Albums (Album Top 100)	20
Finnish Physical Albums (Suomen virallinen lista)	3
French Albums (SNEP)	44
German Albums (Offizielle Top 100)	12
Hungarian Albums (MAHASZ)	5
Italian Albums (FIMI)	20
Japanese Albums (Oricon)	31
Japanese Digital Albums (Oricon)	47
Japanese Download Albums (Billboard Japan)	40
Japanese Top Albums Sales (Billboard Japan)	30
Polish Albums (ZPAV)	84
Scottish Albums (Official Charts)	7
Spanish Albums (Promusicae)	18
Swiss Albums (Schweizer Hitparade)	10
UK Albums (Official Charts)	23
UK Dance Albums (Official Charts)	1
US Top Album Sales (Billboard)	43
US Top Dance Albums (Billboard)	23

=== Monthly charts ===
Monthly chart performance
Chart (2025)	Position
Croatian International Vinyl Albums (HDU)	1

=== Year-end charts ===
Monthly chart performance
Chart (2026)	Position
Croatian International Albums (HDU)	4
