= Electric City of Music Instructor =

Studio album by Music Instructor
- Released: 1998
- Recorded: 1997
- Genre: Electro music, freestyle, breakbeat

Music Instructor chronology
The World of Music Instructor (1996)	Electric City of Music Instructor (1998)	Millennium Hits of Music Instructor (2000)

Electric City of Music Instructor is German group Music Instructor's second album, released in 1998. The album's style is electro/hip hop, unlike their first album The World of Music Instructor, which was mostly techno/happy hardcore. Four tracks from this album have been released as singles - Super Sonic, Rock Your Body, Get Freaky and Electric City and all sound the same - the each track resembles the other three. Earlier edition of Electric City of Music Instructor is titled Electro City and one song on it are different (Get Freaky). All original songs are written and produced by Mike Michaels, MM Dollar, Mark Tabak and Dean Burk a.k.a. Superfly. The album features many guests, such as the Songwriter and Rapper Superfly (Dean Burk), Lunatics and Flying Steps, and some covers of notable classic electro and hip hop tracks.

== Track listing ==
1. "Electric City" [4:13]
2. "Planet Earth" [5:06]
3. "Let The Music Play" [3:56]
4. "Super Sonic" [3:39]
5. "Breakdance" [4:30]
6. "Get Freaky (Single Edit)" [3:47]
7. "Jam On It" [3:44]
8. "Technical Lover" [4:38]
9. "Rock Your Body" [3:33]
10. "Don't Stop The Rock" [3:46]
11. "Funky Nation" [5:18]
12. "Galaxy Jam" [5:15]
13. "Pack Jam" [3:39]
14. "Rock Your Body (Brainbug remix)" [5:54]
15. "We Are The Robots" [3:23]
16. "Music Instructor Megamix" [12:51]

== Charts ==
=== Weekly charts ===
Chart (1998)	Peak position
Hungarian Albums (MAHASZ)	23
Swiss Albums (Schweizer Hitparade)	27
German Albums (Offizielle Top 100)	15
