= List of Billboard number-one dance singles of 2000 =

Billboard magazine compiled the top-performing dance singles in the United States during 2000 on two Hot Dance Music charts: the Club Play and the Maxi-Singles Sales. Premiered in 1976, the Club Play chart ranked the most-played singles on dance club based on reports from a national sample of club DJs. The Maxi-Singles Sales chart was launched in 1985 to compile the best-selling dance singles based on retail sales across the United States.

== Charts history ==
Chart history
Issue date	Hot Dance Music/Club Play		Hot Dance Music/Maxi-Singles Sales		Ref.
Issue date	Song	Artist(s)	Song	Artist(s)	Ref.
January 1	"17 Again"	Eurythmics	"Sexual (Li Da Di)"	Amber	
January 8	"Fly Away (Bye Bye)"	Eyes Cream	"Sexual (Li Da Di)"	Amber	
January 15	"Supersonic"	Jamiroquai	"Sexual (Li Da Di)"	Amber	
January 22	"Above the Clouds"	Amber	"Sexual (Li Da Di)"	Amber	
January 29	"That Sound"	Michael Moog	"Sexual (Li Da Di)"	Amber	
February 5	"Take a Picture"	Filter	"Sexual (Li Da Di)"	Amber	
February 12	"Temperamental"	Everything but the Girl	"Sexual (Li Da Di)"	Amber	
February 19	"I Learned from the Best"	Whitney Houston	"I Learned from the Best"	Whitney Houston	
February 26	"I Learned from the Best"	Whitney Houston	"Maria Maria"	Santana	
March 4	"I Learned from the Best"	Whitney Houston	"Maria Maria"	Santana	
March 11	"Stop Playing with My Mind"	Barbara Tucker featuring Darryl D'Bonneau	"I Learned from the Best"	Whitney Houston	
March 18	"Planet Love"	Taylor Dayne	"Maria Maria"	Santana	
March 25	"Chase"	Giorgio Moroder vs. Jam & Spoon	"Say My Name"	Destiny's Child	
April 1	"American Pie"	Madonna	"Say My Name"	Destiny's Child	
April 8	"Think It Over"	Jennifer Holliday	"Say My Name"	Destiny's Child	
April 15	"King of My Castle"	Wamdue Project	"Say My Name"	Destiny's Child	
April 22	"Missing You"	Kim English	"Say My Name"	Destiny's Child	
April 29	"It Feels So Good"	Sonique	"Say My Name"	Destiny's Child	
May 6	"Be with You"	Enrique Iglesias	"Say My Name"	Destiny's Child	
May 13	"If It Don't Fit"	Abigail	"Say My Name"	Destiny's Child	
May 20	"I'm in Love"	Veronica	"Say My Name"	Destiny's Child	
May 27	"I Will Love Again"	Lara Fabian	"Say My Name"	Destiny's Child	
June 3	"Feelin' So Good"	Jennifer Lopez featuring Big Pun and Fat Joe	"Desert Rose" (Victor Calderone Remix)	Sting Featuring Cheb Mami	
June 10	"When I Get Close to You"	Jocelyn Enriquez	"Desert Rose" (Victor Calderone Remix)	Sting Featuring Cheb Mami	
June 17	"Show Me"	Angel Clivillés	"Desert Rose" (Victor Calderone Remix)	Sting Featuring Cheb Mami	
June 24	"Flash"	Green Velvet	"Desert Rose" (Victor Calderone Remix)	Sting Featuring Cheb Mami	
July 1	"I'm Not in Love"	Olive	"Desert Rose" (Victor Calderone Remix)	Sting Featuring Cheb Mami	
July 8	"Don't You Want My Love"	Rosabel featuring Debbie Jacobs-Rock	"Desert Rose" (Victor Calderone Remix)	Sting Featuring Cheb Mami	
July 15	"Don't You Want My Love"	Rosabel featuring Debbie Jacobs-Rock	"Desert Rose" (Victor Calderone Remix)	Sting Featuring Cheb Mami	
July 22	"Don't Call Me Baby"	Madison Avenue	"Desert Rose" (Victor Calderone Remix)	Sting Featuring Cheb Mami	
July 29	"Bingo Bango"	Basement Jaxx	"Desert Rose" (Victor Calderone Remix)	Sting Featuring Cheb Mami	
August 5	"Bingo Bango"	Basement Jaxx	"Jumpin', Jumpin'"	Destiny's Child	
August 12	"I Never Knew"	Deborah Cox	"Let's Get Married"	Jagged Edge	
August 19	"Spanish Guitar"	Toni Braxton	"Let's Get Married"	Jagged Edge	
August 26	"Desire"	Ultra Naté	"Let's Get Married"	Jagged Edge	
September 2	"Desire"	Ultra Naté	"Let's Get Married"	Jagged Edge	
September 9	"Stronger"	Kristine W	"Music" †	Madonna	
September 16	"Music" †	Madonna	"Music" †	Madonna	
September 23	"Music" †	Madonna	"Music" †	Madonna	
September 30	"Music" †	Madonna	"Music" †	Madonna	
October 7	"Music" †	Madonna	"Music" †	Madonna	
October 14	"Music" †	Madonna	"Music" †	Madonna	
October 21	"Your Child"	Mary J. Blige	"Music" †	Madonna	
October 28	"Don't Want Another Man"	Dynamix presents Tina Ann	"Music" †	Madonna	
November 4	"Lovin' Is Really My Game"	Ann Nesby	"Music" †	Madonna	
November 11	"I Turn to You"	Melanie C	"Music" †	Madonna	
November 18	"Pasilda"	Afro Medusa	"Music" †	Madonna	
November 25	"Pasilda"	Afro Medusa	"Most Girls"	P!nk	
December 2	"Love One Another"	Amber	"Most Girls"	P!nk	
December 9	"Dreamin'"	Loleatta Holloway	"Most Girls"	P!nk	
December 16	"Independent Women Part I"	Destiny's Child	"Most Girls"	P!nk	
December 23	"Livin' for Love"	Natalie Cole	"Independent Women Part I"	Destiny's Child	
December 30	"One More Time"	Daft Punk	"Independent Women Part I"	Destiny's Child	

== See also ==
- 2000 in music
- List of Billboard Hot 100 number ones of 2000
