= Hands in the Air =

Hands in the Air may refer to:

- "Hands in the Air", song by Joe Satriani, Is There Love in Space?
- "Hands in the Air", song by Music Instructor from The World of Music Instructor
- "Hands in the Air", song by 8-Ball from 2 Fast 2 Furious
- "Hands in the Air", song by Miley Cyrus from Bangerz
- "Hands in the Air", song by Timbaland & Ne-Yo from Step Up Revolution soundtrack
- "Hands in the Air", song by Da Brat from Unrestricted
- "Hands in the Air", song by AZ from Aziatic
