= Twisted Records (U.S.) =

American record label

TWISTED Records (also known as TWISTED America, TWISTED United Kingdom, and TWISTED World) is an American record label founded by Rob Di Stefano and Mark Davenport in 1996. Born from the shuttered TRIBAL America label (and its Tribal UK subsidiary), Twisted pioneered the hard house and progressive club styles that rose to international success in the early 2000s.

It released hits such as "Fired Up!", by Funky Green Dogs, "Elements" & "Music is The Answer" by Danny Tenaglia, "Be Yourself" by Celeda, "Revolution" by Superchumbo, "Muscles" by Club 69, "Walking On Thin Ice" by Yoko Ono, "Free Your Mind" by Sapphirecut, "Dark Beat" by Oscar G and Ralph Falcon, and also "So Get Up" by progressive house duo Underground Sound of Lisbon featuring an iconic vocal poem by Californian author/songwriter Ithaka Darin Pappas.

The label released classic albums such as Danny Tenaglia's Tourism, Funky Green Dogs' Get Fired Up, Celeda's This Is It, Club 69's Style, and Superchumbo's Wowie Zowie.

== Roster ==
- Alex Santer
- Danny Tenaglia
- Tom Stephan
- Celeda
- Digitribe
- Funky Green Dogs
- Deep Dish
- Rui da Silva
- DJ Vibe
- Junior Vasquez
- Ono
- Ithaka
- Mindskap
- Louie"Boogie"Balo
- Stereo Soldiers
