= Celeda =

American singer

Celeda (a.k.a. Victoria Sharpe, b. November 17, 1970) is an American dance music singer and drag performer. She was born in Chicago, Illinois.

She began having hits on the U.S. Hot Dance Club Play chart in the late 1990s, beginning with "Music Is the Answer (Dancin' & Prancin')," a collaboration with DJ and producer Danny Tenaglia that peaked at number 15 in 1998. The track reached #36 in the UK Singles Chart in September 1998.

In December 2016, Billboard magazine ranked her as the 97th most successful dance artist of all-time.

In 1999, Celeda released a full-length album entitled This Is It on Twisted Records and on the Portuguese Kaos Records. The album featured tracks produced by E-Smoove, Danny Tenaglia, Cevin Fisher, Peter Rauhofer and Maurice Joshua among others. The tracks released as singles were "Messin' with My Mind" (1997), "Music Is the Answer (Dancin' & Prancin')" (1998), "Be Yourself (And No One Else)" and "Burnin' Up" (1999). The album contained the dance hits "Let the Music Use You Up" and "Happy".

Since then Celeda placed four consecutive singles in the top 10, including "The Underground", which hit number one on the U.S. dance chart in 2001 (originally produced by Peter Rauhofer and remixed by Saeed & Palash).

This Is It track listing

1. "Burnin' Up"
2. "Try Again"
3. "Hooked on You"
4. "Music Is the Answer (Dancin' & Prancin')"
5. "Happy"
6. "Movin' On"
7. "Let the Music Use You Up"
8. "I'm Grateful"
9. "Release the Power"
10. "Beat Me Down"
11. "Messin' with My Mind"
12. "Be Yourself (And No One Else)" (Parts 1 & 2)
13. "Get It Together"
14. "This Is It"

== See also ==
- List of number-one dance hits (United States)
- List of artists who reached number one on the US Dance chart
