= Living for Love (disambiguation) =

"Living for Love" is a song by Madonna.

Living for Love may also refer to:

- Living for Love, novel by Barbara McMahon
- Living for Love, album by Koreana, or the title track
- Livin' for Love: The Natalie Cole Story, a 2000 American film starring Natalie Cole
  - "Livin' for Love", a 2000 song by Natalie Cole
