= Music Instructor =

German electro-dance music project

- Origin: Germany
- Genres: Hip hop, electro, breakbeat, happy hardcore, dancehall
- Years active: 1995–2001
- Labels: Kinetic/Reprise/Warner Bros.

Music Instructor was a German electro-dance music project. The producers and songwriters of Music Instructor were Mike Michaels, Mark "MM" Dollar, and Mark Tabak, also known as Triple-M Crew. Triple-M has also produced other artists and bands such as Brainbug, Flying Steps, Mystica, Highland, The Boyz, Overground, Before Four, US5 and Ayman. Music Instructor often worked with many other artists, especially a group Lunatics and a breakdance crew Flying Steps, and was most active in the late 1990s and early 2000s.

== Beginnings ==
At first, the group made dance music similar to happy hardcore with the singer Holly Trance. Their first single was a cover of "Hymn", originally performed by Ultravox. It was released in 1995, and was followed by the album The World of Music Instructor in 1996 with three more singles – "Hands in the Air", "Dream a Little Dream" and "Dance". They also released the single "Friends Will Be Friends", which was a cover of Queen's song of the same title and appeared in the compilation Queen Dance Traxx.

== Electro music ==
At the time of the regrowing popularity of electro music in 1998, Music Instructor became an electro project, and released the album Electric City of Music Instructor with the singles "Super Sonic", "Rock Your Body", "Get Freaky" and "Electric City". The first three singles featured the German breakdance collective Flying Steps, and "Get Freaky" featured the German hip-hop band Lunatics. For "Get Freaky", a special single edit was made, different from the original song, and the character Abe from the Oddworld video games appeared in videos for both singles. "Super Sonic"'s single version was also slightly different from the album version. The first edition of this album was called Electro City and contained the original version instead of the single edits. The album also featured the Music Instructor Megamix and covers of Newcleus' "Jam on It", Freestyle's "Don't Stop the Rock", Jonzun Crew's "Pack Jam (Look Out for the OVC)" and Shannon's "Let the Music Play".

== Post-electro ==
After the second album, the group remixed DJ Session One's "Dreams In My Fantasy" and released the singles "DJ's Rock Da House" (1999), "Super Fly (Upper MC)" (featuring the rapper Dean Burke from Lunatics), "Highland" (2000), and "Play My Music" (featuring Veronique) (2001).

== Discography ==
=== Albums ===
- 1995The World of Music Instructor
- 1998 Electric City of Music Instructor

=== Singles ===
Year	Single	Peak chart positions					Certifications (sales thresholds)	Album
Year	Single	GER	AUT	NED	SUI	EUR	Certifications (sales thresholds)	Album
1995	"Hymn"	8	15	17	6	34	GER: Gold	The World of Music Instructor
1996	"Hands in the Air"	16	40	45	15	62		The World of Music Instructor
1996	"Dance"	38	—	—	—	—		The World of Music Instructor
1996	"Dream a Little Dream"	—	—	—	—	—		The World of Music Instructor
1996	"Hands in the Air"	—	—	—	—	—		—
1996	"Friends Will Be Friends"	—	—	—	—	—		—
1998	"Super Sonic"	4	24	—	9	16	GER: Gold	Electric City of Music Instructor
1998	"Rock Your Body"	9	—	—	23	65		Electric City of Music Instructor
1998	"Get Freaky"	5	16	—	9	19	GER: Platinum	Electric City of Music Instructor
1999	"Electric City"	12	—	—	15	56		Electric City of Music Instructor
1999	"DJ's Rock da House"	38	—	—	74	—		—
2000	"Super Fly (Upper MC)"	13	—	—	36	68		—
2001	"Play My Music"	—	—	—	—	—		—
"—" denotes releases that did not chart.
