= Nightmare (instrumental) =

1996 single by Brainbug

- UK artwork

Single by Brainbug
- Released: 25 November 1996
- Genre: Dance
- Length: 6:19
- Label: Strike Force; Positiva
- Songwriter: Alberto Bertapelle
- Producer: Alberto Bertapelle

Brainbug singles chronology
"Nightmare" (1996)	"Benedictus" (1997)

Audio
- "Nightmare" (Sinister Strings mix) on YouTube

"Nightmare" is an instrumental composition written, produced, and performed by Italian dance musician Brainbug, released as his debut single. The track was first issued as a single on 25 November 1996 and was re-released in the United Kingdom on 21 April 1997. Following this re-release, the song became a chart hit, reaching number 11 in the United Kingdom, number 14 in Australia, and number 15 in Ireland.

In November 1997, the song was re-issued as a double A-side with Brainbug's next single, "Benedictus", this time reaching number 24 on the UK Singles Chart and number 25 on the Irish Singles Chart. Critically, "Nightmare" was highly praised. In Australia, it was ranked at number 85 on the Triple J Hottest 100 of 1997.

== Critical reception ==
Richard D of music website 909 Originals wrote that "Nightmare" was one of the most "sinister" dance tracks to become a chart hit while British columnist James Masterton wrote that the instrumental "owes more to the Sisters of Mercy than anything else", calling it a "chilling combination of strings and techo beats."

== Track listings ==
=== "Nightmare" ===
- Italian 12-inch single

A1. "Nightmare" (Mistericky version) – 6:27
A2. "Nightmare" (original mix) – 6:19
AA1. "Nightmare" (Isaac version) – 6:20
AA2. "Nightmare" (Oriental mix) – 6:15

- UK 12-inch single (1996)

A. "Nightmare" (Sinister Strings mix) – 6:45
AA. "Nightmare" (A Synergetic mix) – 9:35

- UK and Australian CD single
1. "Nightmare" (Sinister Strings radio edit) – 3:27
2. "Nightmare" (original Sinister Strings mix) – 6:47
3. "Nightmare" (Tall Paul remix) – 9:27
4. "Nightmare" (Burger Queens remix) – 7:48
5. "Nightmare" (Phat Manhattan mix) – 10:11
- UK 12-inch single (1997)

A1. "Nightmare" (original Sinister Strings mix) – 6:47
A2. "Nightmare" (Phat Manhattan mix) – 10:11
AA1. "Nightmare" (Tall Paul remix) – 9:27
AA2. "Nightmare" (Burger Queens remix) – 7:48

- UK cassette single
1. "Nightmare" (Sinister Strings radio edit) – 3:27
2. "Nightmare" (original Sinister Strings mix) – 6:47
3. "Nightmare" (Tall Paul remix) – 9:27
- US maxi-CD single
1. "Nightmare" (Sinister Strings radio edit) – 3:27
2. "Nightmare" (original Sinister Strings mix) – 6:47
3. "Nightmare" (Tall Paul remix) – 9:27
4. "Nightmare" (Burger Queens remix) – 7:48
5. "Nightmare" (Phat Manhattan mix) – 10:11
6. "Nightmare" (Club 69 meets DJ Wild from Paris mix) – 6:51
7. "Nightmare" (Club 69 Future mix) – 6:59
- US 12-inch single 1

A1. "Nightmare" (Phat Manhattan mix) – 7:08
AA1. "Nightmare" (Sinister Strings mix) – 6:46
AA2. "Nightmare" (A Synergetic mix) – 9:32

- US 12-inch single 2

A1. "Nightmare" (Club 69 meets DJ Wild) – 6:51
A2. "Nightmare" (Club 69 Future mix) – 6:59
B1. "Nightmare" (Tall Paul mix)
B2. "Nightmare" (Bonus Beats mix)

=== "Benedictus" / "Nightmare" ===
- Italian and UK 12-inch single

A1. "Benedictus" (Exitiale mix) – 7:18 (6:18 in UK)
A2. "Benedictus" (Epicus Modi mix) – 7:40 (6:26 in UK)
AA1. "Nightmare" (Dexterous remix) – 6:33 (5:37 in UK)
AA2. "Nightmare" (Club 69 meets DJ Wild from Paris mix) – 7:05 (6:28 in UK)

- UK CD single
1. "Benedictus" (Exitiale edit) – 3:33
2. "Nightmare" (original Sinister Strings mix) – 6:47
3. "Benedictus" (Epicus Modi mix) – 6:26
4. "Nightmare" (Club 69 meets DJ Wild from Paris mix) – 6:28
- UK cassette single
1. "Benedictus" (Exitiale edit) – 3:33
2. "Nightmare" (original Sinister Strings mix) – 3:25
3. "Nightmare" (Dexterous remix) – 5:39

== Charts ==
=== Weekly charts ===
"Nightmare"

Chart (1997)	Peak position
Australia (ARIA)	14
Europe (Eurochart Hot 100)	46
Ireland (IRMA)	15
Netherlands (Dutch Top 40 Tipparade)	2
Netherlands (Single Top 100)	47
Scotland Singles (OCC)	10
UK Singles (OCC)	11
UK Dance (OCC)	1
US Dance Club Play (Billboard)	4
US Maxi-Singles Sales (Billboard)	14

"Benedictus" / "Nightmare"

Chart (1997–1998)	Peak position
Australia (ARIA)	77
Europe (Eurochart Hot 100)	70
Ireland (IRMA)	25
Scotland Singles (OCC)	26
UK Singles (OCC)	24
UK Dance (OCC)	1
UK Club Chart (Music Week)	1

=== Year-end charts ===
Chart (1997)	Position
Australia (ARIA)	92
UK Club Chart (Music Week)	64
US Dance Club Play (Billboard)	49

== Release history ==
Region	Version	Date	Format(s)	Label(s)	Ref.
Italy	Solo release	1996	12-inch vinyl	Strike Force	
United Kingdom	Solo release	25 November 1996	12-inch vinyl	Additive	
United Kingdom (re-release)	Solo release	21 April 1997	12-inch vinyl; CD; cassette	Positiva	
United Kingdom	with "Benedictus"	10 November 1997	12-inch vinyl; CD; cassette	Positiva	
