= Don't You Want My Love (Debbie Jacobs song) =

Single by Debbie Jacobs

from the album Undercover Lover
- B-side: "Think I'm Fallin' in Love"
- Released: 1979
- Genre: Disco
- Length: 3:12
- Label: MCA
- Songwriter: Paul Sabu
- Producer: Paul Sabu

Debbie Jacobs singles chronology
"Undercover Lover" (1979)	"Don't You Want My Love" (1979)	"All My Love" (1979)

"Don't You Want My Love" is a 1979 disco single written and produced by Paul Sabu and performed by Debbie Jacobs. Along with the track, "Undercover Lover", "Don't You Want My Love went to #6 on the US disco chart. "Don't You Want My Love" also went to #66 on the soul chart.

== Rosabel recording ==
In 2000, "Don't You Want My Love" the song was remixed and was credited to Rosabel featuring Debbie Jacobs-Rock, this version went to number one on the US dance charts

== See also ==
- List of number-one dance singles of 2000 (U.S.)
