= Fired Up! (song) =

1997 single by Funky Green Dogs

Single by Funky Green Dogs

from the album Get Fired Up
- Released: September 2, 1996
- Studio: HN, Down Low (Miami, Florida)
- Genre: Tribal house; techno; pop
- Length: 7:12
- Label: Twisted America
- Songwriters: Ralph Falcon; Oscar Gaetan
- Producers: Ralph Falcon; Oscar Gaetan

Funky Green Dogs singles chronology
"High Up" (1994)	"Fired Up!" (1996)	"The Way" (1997)

Audio
- "Fired Up!" on YouTube

"Fired Up!" is a song by American house music duo Funky Green Dogs, also known as Murk. Written and produced by group members Ralph Falcon and Oscar Gaetan, the track's vocals are performed by Pamela Williams. "Fired Up!" was released on September 2, 1996, as the lead single from Funky Green Dogs' debut album, Get Fired Up (1996). Music critics responded positively to the song, praising its hook and tribal sound. The song became a number-one hit on the US Billboard Maxi-Singles Sales chart, the Canadian RPM Dance chart, and the Ultratop 50 chart of Belgium's Flanders region. It also reached the top 20 in the United Kingdom and in Belgium's Wallonia region.

== Critical reception ==
Larry Flick of Billboard magazine called "Fired Up!" a "percussive, tribalistic anthem" and noted that the remixes by Danny Tenaglia are "too hot for mere words". In later reviews for the same publication, he referred to the song's hook as "mind-numbing" and described the track as a "stomper that melds the throaty sass of singer Pamela Williams with infectious tribal drums". Music & Media magazine also praised the song's hook, with Marc Pinte of Flemish radio station BRTN Radio Donna calling the track an "absolutely fantastic record" and noting its appeal for both radio and dance clubs.

== Commercial performance ==
Following its commercial release in the United States, "Fired Up!" appeared on the Billboard Maxi-Singles Sales chart, debuting at number 21 on September 14, 1996. The following week, it jumped to number one, giving Funky Green Dogs their only number-one single on this chart. On the Billboard Dance Club Play chart, the song reached number two in early November 1996 and spent 15 weeks on the ranking, making it their joint-longest-charting single on this listing along with "Body" and "Rise Up". The song also appeared on the main Billboard Hot 100 chart in February 1997, peaking at number 80 that April and charting for 14 weeks; it is the band's only appearance on this ranking. In Canada, the track topped the RPM Dance chart in December 1996 and was the country's 26th-most-successful dance hit of 1997.

Outside North America, "Fired Up!" charted in several Western European countries. In the Flanders region of Belgium, the song debuted at number 15 on the Ultratop 50 chart on March 22, 1997. Over the following four weeks, it rose and fell within the top 10, eventually ascending to number one on April 26. It held the top spot for five consecutive weeks and stayed on the chart for 24 weeks in total, ending the year as Flanders' eighth-highest-selling single. The song also reached the top 20 in the Wallonia region, where it peaked at number 11, spent 16 weeks within the Ultratop 40, and finished at number 74 on the region's year-end chart. The song is certified gold in Belgium for selling over 25,000 copies. In the Netherlands, "Fired Up!" peaked at number 23 on the Dutch Top 40 listing and number 40 on the Single Top 100 chart. On the UK Singles Chart, the single debuted and peaked at number 17 in April 1997, making it Funky Green Dogs' only top-40 UK hit. On the Eurochart Hot 100, "Fired Up" reached number 31 the same month.

== Track listings ==
=== 1996 releases ===
US, European, and Australian maxi-CD single

1. "Fired Up!" (Twilo Anthem edit)
2. "Fired Up!" (Club 69's Future mix)
3. "Fired Up!" (Murk's original groove)
4. "Fired Up!" (Club 69's Future dub)
5. "Fired Up!" (Peter's Plastic Disco mix)
- A second maxi-CD with the same ID was also released in the US featuring a sixth track: the Brat radio edit.

US 12-inch single

A1. "Fired Up!" (Murk's original groove)
A2. "Fired Up!" (Club 69's Future dub)
B1. "Fired Up!" (Peter's Plastic Disco mix)
B2. "Fired Up!" (Murk's Vocaled Up dub)

US and UK 2×12-inch single; UK CD single

1. "Fired Up!" (Twilo Anthem edit)
2. "Fired Up!" (Club 69's Future mix)
3. "Fired Up!" (Murk's original groove)
4. "Fired Up!" (Club 69's Future dub)
5. "Fired Up!" (Peter's Plastic Disco mix)
6. "Fired Up!" (Murk's Vocaled Up dub)

=== 1997 releases ===
US CD single

1. "Fired Up!" (Club 69's radio edit)
2. "Fired Up!" (the Murk radio edit)

US cassette single

A. "Fired Up!" (Brat radio edit)
B. "Fired Up!" (Club 69's Future dub)

US 12-inch single (remixes)

A1. "Fired Up!" (Junior's Arena Anthem mix) – 14:11
B1. "Fired Up!" (Angel's DDDDDeep vocal mix) – 9:54
B2. "Fired Up!" (Deep-apella) – 2:05

US maxi-CD single (remixes)

1. "Fired Up!" (Angel's radio mix) – 4:12
2. "Fired Up!" (Junior's Arena Anthem mix) – 14:11
3. "Fired Up!" (Angel's DDDDDeep vocal mix) – 9:54
4. "Fired Up!" (Deep-apella) – 2:05

UK CD single

1. "Fired Up!" (Club 69 edit) – 3:45
2. "Fired Up!" (Angel's DDDDDeep vocal mix) – 9:58
3. "Fired Up!" (Danny's Twilo Anthem edit) – 9:33
4. "Fired Up!" (Club 69's Future mix) – 7:25
5. "Fired Up!" (Club 69's Future dub) – 5:08

UK 12-inch single

A1. "Fired Up!" (Angel's DDDDDeep vocal mix) – 9:58
B1. "Fired Up!" (Brat edit) – 4:00
B2. "Fired Up!" (Club 69's Future mix) – 7:25

UK cassette single

1. "Fired Up!" (Club 69 edit) – 3:45
2. "Fired Up!" (Club 69's Future mix) – 7:25

== Credits and personnel ==
Credits are taken from the Get Fired Up liner notes.

Studios

- Recorded at HN Studios and Down Low Studios (Miami, Florida)
- Mastered at Frankford Wayne Mastering Labs (New York City)

Personnel

- Ralph Falcon – writing, production, mixing
- Oscar Gaetan – writing, production, mixing
- Pamela Williams – vocals
- Carlos Santos – engineering
- Rick Essig – mastering

== Charts ==
=== Weekly charts ===
Chart (1997)	Peak position
Belgium (Ultratop 50 Flanders)	1
Belgium (Ultratop 50 Wallonia)	11
Canada Dance/Urban (RPM)	1
Europe (Eurochart Hot 100)	31
Netherlands (Dutch Top 40)	23
Netherlands (Single Top 100)	40
Scottish Singles Sales (Official Charts)	21
UK Singles (Official Charts)	17
UK Dance (Official Charts)	3
US Billboard Hot 100	80
US Dance Club Songs (Billboard)	2
US Dance Singles Sales (Billboard)	1

=== Year-end charts ===
Chart (1996)	Position
US Maxi-Singles Sales (Billboard)	47

Chart (1997)	Position
Belgium (Ultratop 50 Flanders)	8
Belgium (Ultratop 50 Wallonia)	74
Canada Dance/Urban (RPM)	26
US Maxi-Singles Sales (Billboard)	17

== Certifications ==
Region	Certification	Certified units/sales
Belgium (BRMA)	Gold	25,000^{*}
^{*} Sales figures based on certification alone.

== Release history ==
Region	Date	Format(s)	Label(s)	Ref.
United Kingdom	September 2, 1996	2×12-inch vinyl; CD	Twisted United Kingdom	
United States	1996	12-inch vinyl; maxi-CD	Twisted America	
United States	1997	12-inch vinyl; CD; cassette	Twisted America	
United Kingdom (re-release)	March 31, 1997	12-inch vinyl; CD; cassette	Twisted United Kingdom	
