= Hell & Heaven =

Annual Brazilian LGBT event

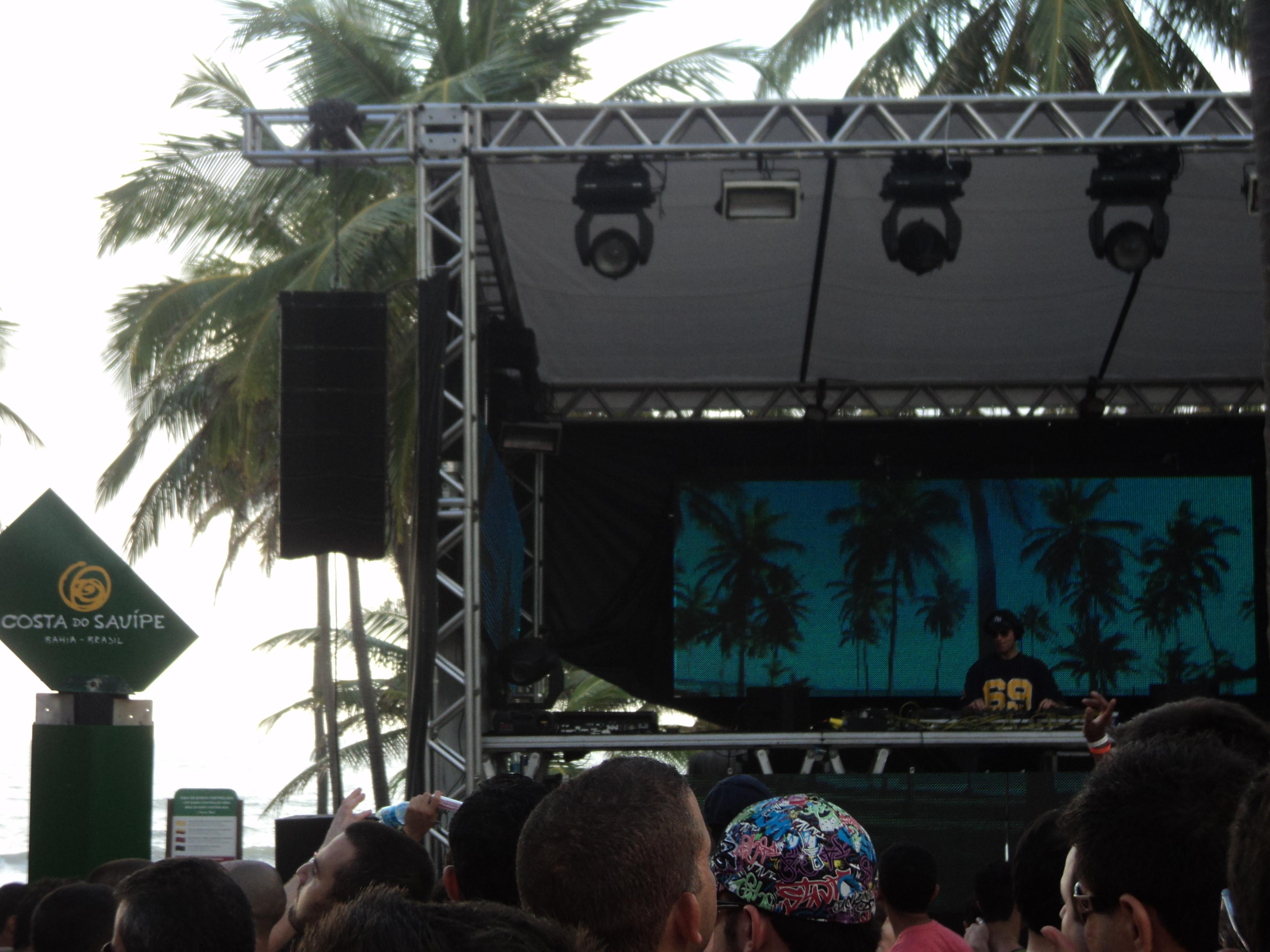
The DJ Peter Rauhofer in 2010 H & H.

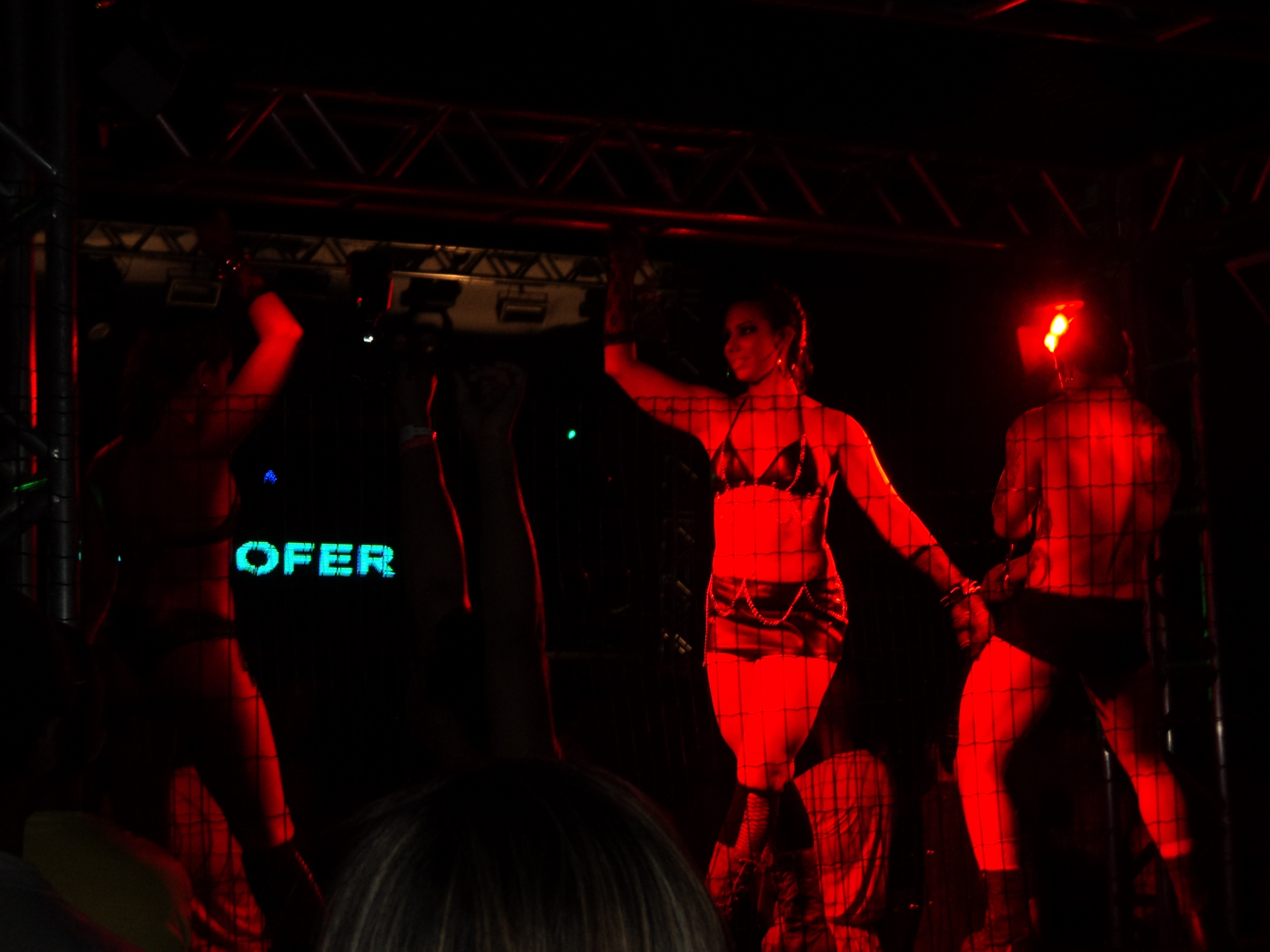
Dancers in 2010 Hell & Heaven.

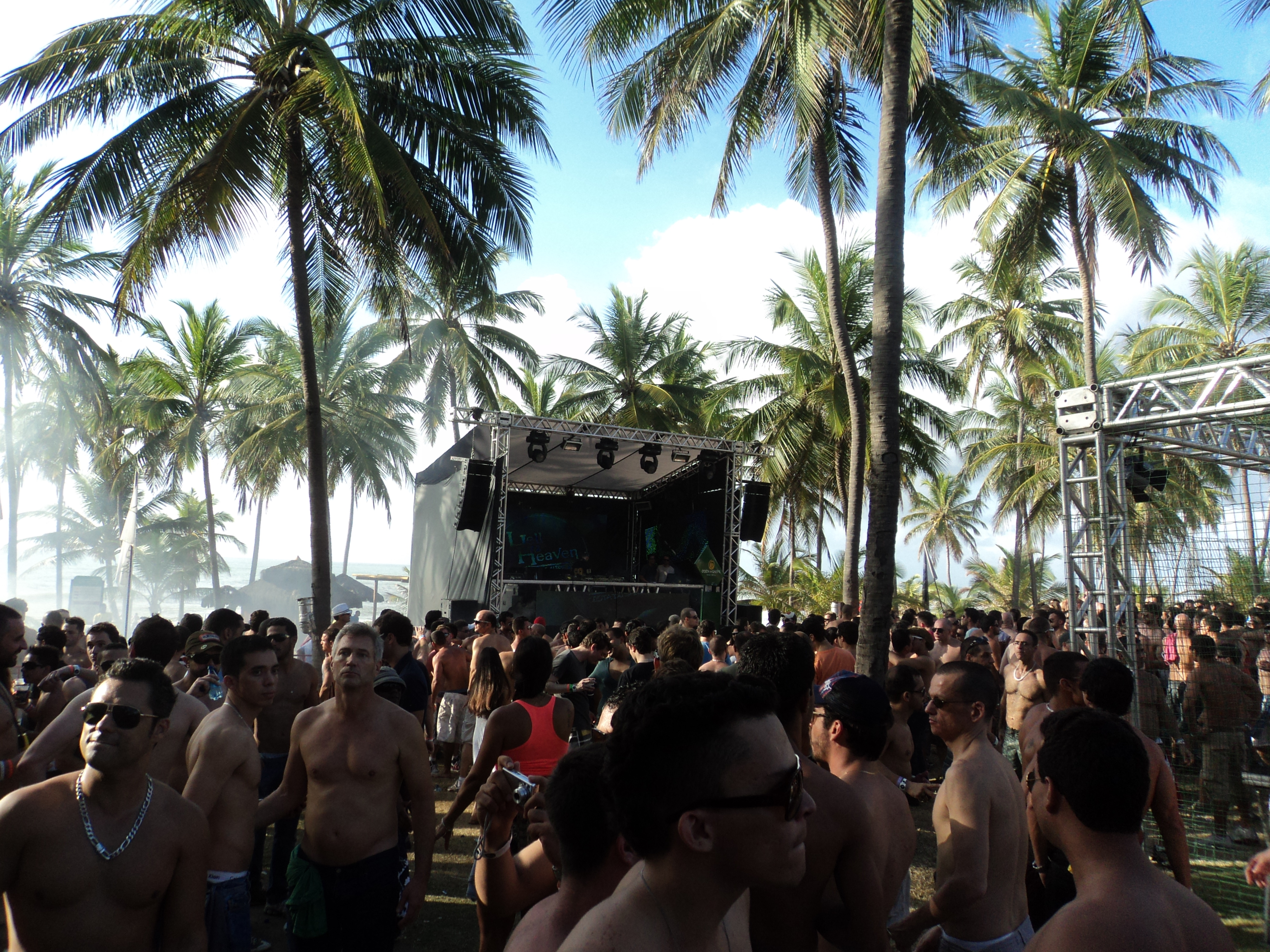
People in 2010 Hell & Heaven.

Hell & Heaven is an annual Brazilian LGBT event, the first edition occurred in 2009. Between 2009 and 2011 the even was held at a beach resort next to the town of Mata de São João, Sauípe Coast, State of Bahia, Northeastern Brazil. In 2012 to present the event is held in Guarajuba in Vila Galé Resort.

== See also ==
- List of LGBT events
- LGBT rights in Brazil
- LGBT rights in the World
