= Sapphirecut =

American singer

Sapphirecut is the alias of singer Megan Taylor, born in Pittsburgh, Pennsylvania. The name was used originally for the progressive trance sound she formed with keyboardists Dave Shaffer and Jake Knights.

== Music career ==
In December 2001, Taylor brought dubplates of the group's track "Free Your Mind" to the Winter Music Conference in Miami and handed them out to all of the DJs she admired. She picked up the phone months later, and it was superstar DJ Danny Tenaglia looking to license the track for his Back to Basics collection. The track was an underground dance classic being played by Tiesto, Paul Oakenfold, Ferry Corsten globally in concerts and on club floors around the world. The Free Your Mind track was signed by Rob DiStefano of Twisted Records(America) and the "Free Your Mind" single which was released in 2003 quickly climbed the dance charts where it was a top 10 dance track in Billboard magazine. Sapphirecut made the news when Taylor contacted the popular and electronica oriented file-sharing network, Soulseek, in an effort to stop the group's music from being shared amongst users. She was concerned that the label she signed the track to would not get any revenue and was concerned for fellow artists. When Soulseek's server host Verio became aware of the situation, they dropped the network and it was unavailable for weeks. Sapphirecut's actions soon became a hot topic on forums across the Internet.

Taylor has told interviewers that she choose the Sapphirecut name when she realized that a sapphire needle is used to create a dub plate at a friends new dub plate press Scrunch Recordings in 2001. She found this out when she was helping physically balance his new dub plate press and learned these were used as the original template of vinyls. She decided to be released as a sound globally carried by these types of cuts and named the original sounds that were created in her studio in Philadelphia, Sapphirecut. Sapphirecut has produced many original and remixed releases. She has albums and singles released on various labels including her own label OSP. Sapphirecut is digitally released by Ingrooves and Isolation network. Her album is a mixture of electronic songs written and mixed by Sapphirecut and played by various co artists.

Sapphirecut was one of the pioneers opening the airwaves in the Northeast US, California and Maui to club and electronic music with her 2-hour weekly FM/AM/Internet radio program where electronic and dance music played openly from around the globe and DJ/Producers and Electronic Musicians were featured weekly with interviews with fresh shows running for 5 years until 2012. Sapphirecut created the show in her home studio where she used international calls or her recording booth when artists were in town to create the interview content. She mixed the weekly 2 hour show with fresh announced music and served as a talk host, distributing the show for no compensation as a global community service. Reruns have played at various stations since that time. She has had various artists like Markus Schulz, Dfuse, Infusion, David Guetta, etc. as featured artists and created separate heading for each station the show ran was on.

In 2006, Sapphirecut co created Videohouse Live with local video and fine artists in Philadelphia which served as a creative visual and musical exchange. The show was a visual original film/fine art program running as both a dinner and late night club event. It was viewed in digital and 3 D forum using submitted works from the art community in Philadelphia. Sapphirecut DJed the event and played at this VJd event in the World Cafe Live in Philadelphia working with the various artists such as the Art Institute of Philadelphia's Instructor Brian Yetzer, as well as visual artist and VJ's Lauren Galante and Masa. Sapphirecut also DJ'ed other Videohouse events at Emerald City in Philadelphia with other VJ's and artists. Sapphirecut asked for no personal compensation for this community service. Money collected was for venue only.

== Discography ==
2001 "Free Your Mind Sapphirecut Clubmix" Artists-Sapphirecut, Dave Shaffer, Jake Knights, Paul Atkinson Vocals Sapphirecut Twisted Records (America), Vinyl

2001 "Free Your Mind Vocal Mix" Artists Sapphirecut and Dave Shaffer, Vocals Sapphirecut and Sapphirecut "Free Your Mind Sapphirecut Clubmix" Single Twisted Records with Intergroove UK, CD

2003 Free Your Mind Full CD: Tracks:

1. "Free Your Mind Sapphirecut Club Mix" Sapphirecut, Jake Knights, Dave Shaffer and Paul Atkinson
2. "Free Your Mind DT's Original Club Re-Mix" Danny Tenaglia
3. "Free Your Mind Jim Albert's and Danny Tenaglias Twisted Trip" Jim Albert and Danny Tenaglia
4. "Action Reaction Sapphirecut's Chemical Mix" Sapphirecut and Jake Knights
5. "Action Reaction Sapphirecut's Physical Mix" Sapphirecut and Jake Knights

Twisted Records (Vinyl)

2004 Together Single CD Track List includes 4 versions of "Together" Sapphirecut and Dave Shaffer, vocals Sapphirecut

1. "In Your Veins Mix" Sapphirecut
2. "Come together Dub" Sapphirecut
3. "Original Mix" Sapphirecut and Dave Shaffer
4. "Omid 16b mix"

Bonus tracks

1. "Action Reaction Sapphirecut Chemical Mix" Sapphirecut, Knights and Bowie
2. "Action Reaction Sapphirecut Physical Mix" Sapphirecut, Knights and Bowie
3. Sapphirecut remix of Omid 16b and Desyn Masiello's "Solar Plexus", Twisted Records(America) CD, digital distribution.

2004 Together Sapphirecut Original and Omid 16B Remix Twisted Records, Vinyl

Nov. 2005 Archives of Sound Full CD produced by Sapphirecut with various coartists, Sapphireccut vocals Track listing

1. "Dream Dreamland" Sapphirecut with Jake Knights
2. "Always Believe" Sapphirecut with Dave Shaffer
3. "There's a Reason" Sapphirecut with Dave Shaffer
4. "Live It Up" Sapphirecut with Jake Knights
5. "Light in the Shadow" Sapphirecut with Dave Shaffer
6. "This Moment" Sapphirecut with Dave Shaffer
7. "How Do You Do" Sapphirecut with Jake Knights
8. "Ambient Love" Sapphirecut with Jake Knights
9. "Space to Feel" Sapphirecut with Knights and Bowie
10. "Thrust and Grind" Sapphirecut and Dave Shaffer
11. "Things Change" Sapphirecut
12. "The Sunshine" Sapphirecut, Dave Shaffer, Paul Atkinson
13. "Mixed Desires" Sapphirecut, Dave Shaffer
14. "Avec Moi" Sapphirecut, Dave Shaffer, Paul Atkinson
15. "Sea of Cloud" Sapphirecut and Dave Shaffer
16. "Daydream" Sapphirecut and Dave Shaffer

Released on CD by OSP(Our Soundfront Publications) and digital distribution by Ingrooves 2005.

June 28, 2005 "Passport:Kingdom of the Netherlands" Mixed Compilation of Ferry Corsten including "Sapphirecut and Jake Knights Epic Mix of Free Your Mind" Thrive Records

2006 "Dreamdreamland" Single Sapphirecut and Jake Knights, vocals Sapphirecut 1." Dream Dub Mix" Sapphirecut and Jake Knights 2." Dancing Dreams Mix" released digital distribution by Ingrooves

4/26/2007 "There's a Reason" Single Justin Paul Original Re-Mix of Sapphirecut's vocals

Playloop records CD compilation Get Into the Loop Playloops Record CD and Digital

2008 "dPen ft Sapphirecut Dirty Love", 2 versions vocal by Sapphirecut mix by dPen digital Pistachio Records

2008 "Losing Hope Sapphirecut ft. dPen" Multipack single Track Listing:

1. "Original Sapphirecut Vocal Mix" Sapphirecut and Dave Shaffer
2. "Original Instrumental" Sapphirecut and Dave Shaffer
3. "Apologist Vocal" Brusca Mix with Sapphirecut vocal
4. " Unplugged" Sapphirecut and Brusca PYC002 Vinyl

In addition Digital: 1. Original Vocal 2. Original Instrumental 3. Apologist Vocal 5. "Apologist Instrumental"

1. "Brusca & Sam Perez Vocal Mix"
2. "Brusca & Sam Perez Instrumental"

PyCairo Records distributed by Astral Music

=== Remixes ===
10/2003 "Solar Plexus" Sapphirecut and Dave Shaffer Re- Mix, Sexonwax for Omid 16b and Desyn Masiello Vinyl and Digital

11/2003 "Pornorama and Louise Carver - I'd Say Yes", Sapphirecut with Dave Shaffer, Club Mix and Dub Mix Illustrious Records Vinyl and Digital

4/2007 "Yoko Ono - I Don't Know" Sapphirecut, Shaffer and Bowie released on Yoko Ono's Open Your Box CD and digital

8/2007 "Sleepthief ft. Kirsty Hawkshaw's -Chauffeur" Sapphirecut and Dave Shaffer Re-Mix on Compilation of Mixes Chauffeur, which made the Top 40 charts- Album and Digital Neurodisc records

2010 "Loverush UK ft Shelley Harland Different World Sapphirecut Atmospheric Mix" Sapphirecut with Dave Shaffer's Loverush UK Digital
