= Red Bull Flying Bach =

Red Bull Flying Bach is a dance performance by Flying Steps and guest ballerina Yui Kawaguchi / Anna Holmstrom. The work combines breakdance with modern ballet, performed to an electronica adaptation of Johann Sebastian Bach's The Well-Tempered Clavier. The music was arranged by Christoph Hagel and the piece choreographed by Vartan Bassil.

The performance has been popular worldwide, and premiered in the United States in June 2014. It won an Echo Klassik award in 2010. This routine was performed at the Bundestag, the 2011 Eurovision Song Contest and the Federal Presidency's Summer Festival, and it was given a special Echo award.
