= Get Fired Up =

Studio album by Funky Green Dogs
- Released: 1996
- Genre: Techno
- Label: Twisted America/MCA
- Producer: Murk

Professional ratings
Review scores
| Source | Rating |
|---|---|
| AllMusic | 4/5 stars |
| Spin | 7/10 |

Get Fired Up is the debut album of Murk as Funky Green Dogs. It was released on Twisted America/MCA Records, catalog number TWD-11511.

The production doesn't stray far from the catchy, successful formula of the two major club chart hits and pop crossover hits "The Way" and "Fired Up!". Other hit singles include "Some Kind of Love" and "Until the Day."

== Critical reception ==
Spin called it "a terrific party disc" and "a fine tonic for your pre-millennium tension blues." CMJ New Music Monthly wrote that "few producers could whip up such funky arrangements, yet provide enough room for the inherent groove to work its magic."

== Track listing ==
1. "The Way"
2. "Fired Up!"
3. "Noticiasnun"
4. "Some Kind of Love"
5. "Until The Day"
6. "Noticiasdos"
7. "So Good"
8. "Why?"
9. "Pigsty"
10. "Noticiastres"
11. "I Came to Stomp"
12. "Ride"
13. "Night of the Funky Green Dogs from Outer Space"

== Personnel ==
- Murk
- Pamela Williams
