= Gone Gone Gone (Madonna song) =

Promotional single by Madonna

from the album Veronica Electronica
- Released: July 19, 2025
- Recorded: 1997
- Studio: Larrabee Sound Studios, Los Angeles
- Genre: Electronica, trip hop
- Length: 4:40
- Label: Maverick Warner Rhino
- Songwriters: Madonna, Rick Nowels
- Producers: Madonna, Rick Nowels

"Gone Gone Gone" is a song by American singer Madonna, originally recorded in 1997 during the sessions for her seventh studio album, Ray of Light (1998). It remained unreleased for decades and was officially issued on July 19, 2025, as a promotional single from her compilation album Veronica Electronica.

== Background and release ==
"Gone Gone Gone" was written by Madonna and her the producer Rick Nowels in 1997, before William Orbit's arrival on the production of the album Ray of Light. However, it was left out of the final tracklist and remained unreleased for decades. A demo version of "Gone Gone Gone" leaked online in the early 2010s, quickly gaining attention from fans who praised its haunting, atmospheric quality.

In July 2025, the track was remastered and officially released as the second promotional single from Veronica Electronica, a compilation of rare and unreleased material from the Ray of Light era.

== Composition ==
"Gone Gone Gone" incorporates elements of electronica and trip hop, layered with ambient textures and minimalistic beats. Madonna's vocals are presented with a distant, ethereal tone, while the lyrics speak of emotional disconnection, transformation, and inner turmoil. The Times described it as "a heartbreak rave ballad".

== Reception ==
"Gone Gone Gone" received generally positive reviews from music critics. Shaad D'Souza from The Guardian described the track as "a haunting piece that illustrates the experimental brilliance of the Ray of Light era." Ed Power from The Irish Times called it "a postcard from the edge of the rave era," emphasizing its dreamlike and nostalgic qualities. The Line of Best Fit highlighted the song’s "glitchy joy and meditative atmosphere."

In the UK, "Gone Gone Gone" debuted at number 76 on the Official Singles Sales Chart and number 72 on the Singles Downloads Chart. In the United States, it peaked at number 8 on the Billboard Dance Digital Song Sales chart.

== Charts ==
Weekly chart performance for "Gone Gone Gone"
Chart (2025)	Peak position
UK Singles Sales (OCC)	76
US Dance Digital Song Sales (Billboard)	8

== See also ==
- List of unreleased songs recorded by Madonna
