= Murk (album) =

Studio album by Murk
- Released: 2003
- Genre: Dance, Electronic, House music
- Label: Tommy Boy

Murk chronology
Miami Deep (1998)	Murk (2003)

Self titled, Murk is the duo's fourth album, released in 2004 on Tommy Boy Entertainment, catalog number TB 1572. It includes previous hit singles and new album tracks. Vocalists on the album include Murk's lead singer, Tamara Wallace, Greg "Stryke Chin, and Jennifer Carbonell," and Kristine W on "Some Lovin'." Includes 5 consecutive #1 Hot Dance Music/Club Play chart hits: "Some Lovin'," "Believe," "Doesn't Really Matter," "All Right," and "Time."

== Track listings ==
1. "Some Lovin'"
2. "Time"
3. "Believe"
4. "All Right"
5. "Doesn't Really Matter"
6. "Let Me Go"
7. "True"
8. "Baba-Sulei"
9. "Opera"
10. "Afro-Cuba"
