= The World of Music Instructor =

Studio album by Music Instructor
- Released: TBA, 1996
- Recorded: 1995
- Genre: Techno, happy hardcore

Music Instructor chronology
_	The World of Music Instructor (1996)	Electric City of Music Instructor (1998)

The World of Music Instructor is German group Music Instructor's first album, released in 1996. Unlike their second album Electric City of Music Instructor, most tracks on this album are in techno/happy hardcore style. Music Instructor worked on this album together with the musician and singer Holly Trance. The album features four singles - Hymn, Hands In The Air, Dream A Little Dream and Dance. The first single Hymn is a cover of the Ultravox song of the same title. Most of the songs are written and produced by Mike Michaels, MM Dollar and Mark Tabak.

== Track listing ==
1. "Intro" [0:39]
2. "Hymn (Go Down Mix)" [5:20]
3. "Hands In The Air (Original Mix)" [5:17]
4. "Dream A Little Dream" [3:50]
5. "Everybody" [3:40]
6. "Na.. Na.. Na.." [3:30]
7. "Dance" [3:30]
8. "Celebration" [4:06]
9. "If You Feel Alone" [4:08]
10. "Stay By Me" [4:15]
11. "Dream A Little Dream (Special Pitch-Version)" [3:40]
12. "Hands In The Air (Circle Nordlead Mix)" [5:11]
13. "Dance (Bonus Track)" [3:34]
14. "If You Feel Alone (Bonus Track)" [4:10]

== Charts ==
=== Weekly charts ===
Chart (1996)	Peak position
Hungarian Albums (MAHASZ)	14
