= Mezame No Hakobune =

Open Your Mind
- DVD cover
- Kanji: めざめの方舟
- Directed by: Hiroyuki Hayashi
- Written by: Kenji Kawai (song)
- Produced by: Atsushi Kubo; Masuo Ueda; Tomonori Ochikoshi
- Music by: Kenji Kawai
- Distributed by: Deiz, Aniplex
- Release dates: March 25, 2005 (pavilion Pt.1); May 25, 2005 (pavilion Pt.2); July 25, 2005 (pavilion Pt.3)
- Running time: 34 minutes
- Language: Japanese

Mezame no hakobune (めざめの方舟; lit. "Ark of Awakening"), aka Open Your Mind (international title), is a 2005 three-act musical drama presented on a multidisplay IMAX-like theme theater mixing CG-animated video with live-action footage directed by Japanese filmmaker Mamoru Oshii.

An OVA compilation version, renamed Open Your Mind: Special Edition, was available in limited quantities only at the Aichi Expo souvenir shop until it was re-released at the end of the expo as a Complete Edition which included a "Making of" bonus DVD and a color booklet.

== Concept ==
"Mamoru Oshii, a world-renowned director of animated and live-action films, created a multifaced performance that made use of such elements as images on the world's largest floor screen to produce a three-dimensional performance, making this the first experimental space in the history of World Expositions. The aim is have visitors think anew about the recovery of the Earth while experiencing the wonder of nature and the environment." Production note

== Pavilion version ==
=== Theme theater ===
Open Your Mind was created for the World Exposition 2005's ("愛・地球博 Expo 2005 Aichi Japan") "Mountain of Dreams" (夢みる山, Yume miru yama) pavilion. The theme theater had a capacity of 200 viewers and the facility was named "Floor Plasma Multi MultiDisplay System" and used 99 screens. The show was available for six months, from March until September 2005, with a new 10 minutes episode released bimonthly.

The theater was designed as a shrine with each side of the floor screens surrounded by four rows of full sized standing Ku-Nu clones. Above the 139 dog-headed generals hovered the Pan doll appearing in the movie. The goddess was surrounded by silk curtains and the doll footage featured in the Intermission: Pan scene was shot in the theater.

Viewers were divided in two groups with 30 tickets available for the floor (aka "arena", アリーナ) while the remaining 170 viewers had to go to the second level (known as the "slope" スロープ).

=== Video ===
The visual part consisted of a two level multidisplay. The first part was a floor panel linking ninety-six 50" plasma screens. It was suitable for 1:33 video which could be individually displayed by each monitor or as a synchronized 10 m x 9 m large screen. It was made of a horizontal row of 8 monitors and a vertical row of 12 monitors, which gave a 90m² floor screen and was the world's largest.

The second part of the facility was a panoramic 3-widescreen 180° multidisplay broadcasting 16:9 footages. Pictures and light effects were also projected on the ceiling, made from eight silk curtains, or the 5 meter acrylic egg-shaped (タマゴ形, tamago) screen.

=== Audio ===
The movie score composer Kenji Kawai chose three kinds of music to illustrate the show. One part was made of synthesizer-based new-age pieces, similar to Mike Oldfield's Tubular Bells, the other themes are typically Japanese. One was based on the use of taiko, the folkloric drums backing Noh polyphonic chants sung by a chorus of seven women — This is Kawai's signature since Mamoru Oshii's critically acclaimed and cult 1995 anime feature film, Ghost In The Shell. The other was the remaining meditative part combining Zen music with the soundtrack's natural audio effects.

== Special Edition ==
=== Home cinema ===
Due to the technical limitations of video formats the original 360°, bipolar, multidisplay system was reduced to a straight and flat projection which reduces the three dimensional experience and immersion felt in the pavilion version.

=== Video ===
The Special Edition allows a better visibility of the overall film which was reduced in the pavilion due to viewers walking on the floor screen monitor and slope viewers standing in front of the wall widescreens. A benefit of the single screen projection is the removal of the mosaic effect, on the main screen, due to the PNP (Plasma Network System) architecture.

=== Audio ===
The soundtrack of the OVA editions is available in both stereo and DD5.1 multichannel versions — the latter being more faithful to the 6.1 channel surround sound original format.

== Overview ==
=== Musical drama ===
The tale is of mixed genres, from science fiction to ecology and through mythology to fantasy. It is a three-act musical drama concept with a prologue and epilogue, both named intermission, by Kenji Kawai who is the composer of the score. The characters' introduction and drama is narrated through the lyrics of the opera-like Noh chanted recitation, which is self referred to as utai (謡い) within the movie.

=== Plot ===
The plot of Open Your Mind follows the extra–terrestrial origin of life coming from outerspace as six deities (Intermission act), evolving into water (Sho-ho) who then emerge into the air (Hyakkin) and to the ground (Ku-nu). Each of these creatures rules one of the six elements of the godai philosophy — Earth, Water, Fire, Wind (referred to as kaze in the Hyakkin chant), Sky and Consciousness (referred to as "Awakening" in the movie's title).

=== Characters ===
- Pan (汎, "Pantheism")

The three headed goddess sending the generals to Earth. Her six armed physical aspect is based on Benzaiten, Japanese pantheism goddess of music, arts, sciences, wisdom and a protective figure.

- The 6 Riki-Shou (大将, "Generals")
  - Sho-Ho (靑鰉)
  - Hyakkin (百禽, "Hundred-Bird")
  - Ku-Nu (狗奴, "Dog Being")
  - Batoh
  - Ryo-Ketsu
  - Kon-Goh
- Chimeras (キメラ, kimera)

=== Possible interpretations ===
Open Your Mind starts as a kind of space journey and exploration of a foreign planet by an advanced civilization. The time is unexplained: it could be an offworld intelligence form visiting our planet, or it could be future human travellers visiting a remote galaxy.

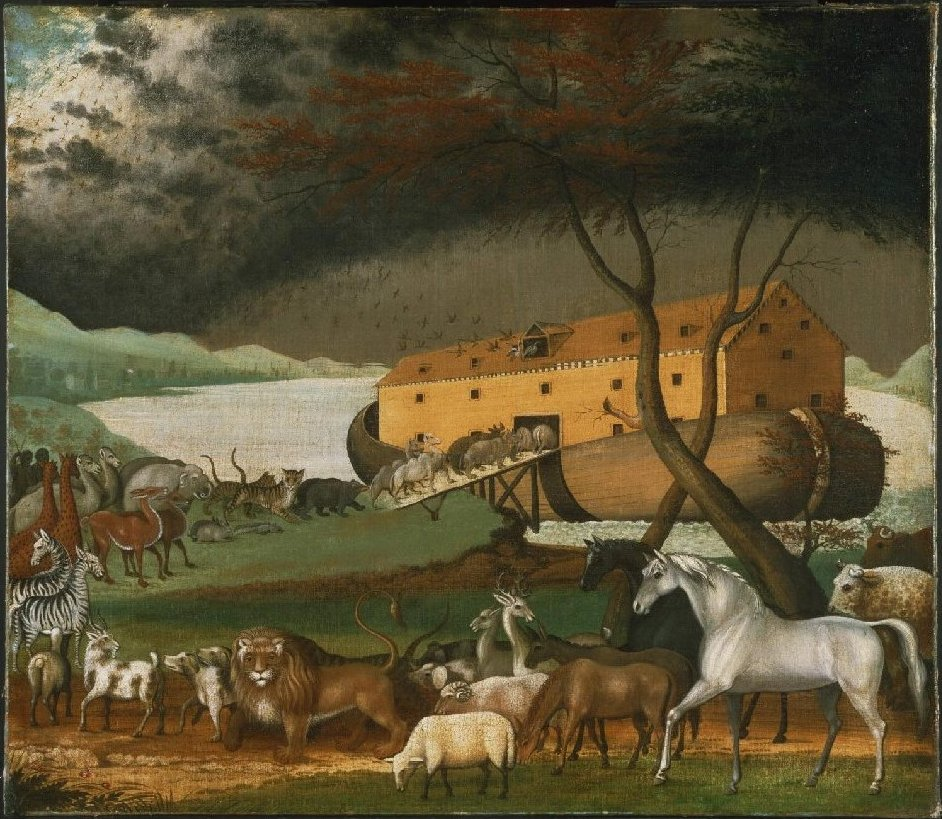
The Ark of Awakening can be regarded as a futuristic version of Noah's Ark.

Also it could be a fabricated dream, à la Soylent Green, experienced by one of our descendants willing to learn how precious and beautiful the Earth was in its prime and experienced through a chronological and geographical exploration of the planet. Dreams are a classic theme in Oshii's production including Urusei Yatsura: Beautiful Dreamer and The Red Spectacles. The pavilion concept's name "Mountain of Dreams" is probably not a coincidence.

According to the theory, agreed by Oshii (quote interview), that the futuristic projection of science fiction is nothing more than a metaphorous description of the present and current society, just like Montesquieu (in Persian Letters) and Voltaire (in L'Ingénu) implicitly describing -criticizing- their own country through the eyes of a foreign character or civilization, this work could be viewed as a warning (or "Awakening") to preserve our, current, highly menaced, biosphere and ecosystem before it is too late. This film was presented at the World Exposition hence its universal message and collective matter.

The original title "Ark of Awakening" (Mezame no hakobune), is a double reference to the Bible's "Noah's Ark" and to Buddha, which means "awakened". In this perspective the movie can be interpreted as a futuristic, post-flood, returning trip to Earth on board an ark ship with the featured creatures being part of the breeding stock of saved animals. Vis-à-vis the amount of religious references being Shinto (animist presentation of nature as a living power, lyrics about kami, kagami or mikoto), Buddhism (mandala, music, "zen" blue shaded photography, animal headed anthropomorph beings), the Bible (Noah's Ark, Great Flood, Genesis) or the Greek mythology (Centaur, Chimera), and connecting them with the depiction of fantasy ancient or future- races that are the mysterious creatures, this work could also be regarded as a mythological tale of Creation (or Genesis), in the likes of Stanley Kubrick's Space Odyssey.

== Story ==
=== Opening ===
This introduction begins with the Buddhist representation of the cosmos through mandala shaped cogwheels emitting a mechanical clockwork sound. The following sequence is set in space with a liquid planet soon entered by six shining globes (the Riki-Shou sent by Pan) moving at high speed and coming from each side of the screen.

=== Intermission: Riki-Shou (prologue) ===
This first live-action scene is set in a foggy forest (which is also an Element in the gogyō philosophy), inhabited by a group of three mysterious anthropomorph creatures. They are standing still, silent, glowing in their shining white togas, they look like some kind of anthropomorph gods of Buddhist mythology. They are the Riki-Shou, the animal headed generals, sent by Pan. The creature standing in front of the trio is Ku-Nu, the dog face Riki-Shou, on his right is Hyakkin, the eagle faced, while on his left stands Sho-Ho, the fish head general. The action is seen in first person view through the eyes of an untold character which makes the viewer the main character of this story. After a while the viewer leaves the woods and the following acts will introduce the Riki-Shou, one after the other, starting with Sho-Ho. This forest scene will follow and end in the last part of the movie which is set after the Ku-Nu act.

This unnarrated introduction is wrapped with sounds of nature and Buddhist music that is in homage to Kawai's previous score on the prologue of Oshii's Patlabor 2: the Movie which takes place in a Cambodian forest and features a giant Buddha statue.

=== Act I: Sho-Ho (靑鰉~水の記憶) ===
(Sho-ho: Mizu no kioku, lit. "Bluegreen-Sturgeon: Remembrance of water"
Open Your Mind episode available from March 25 until May 24, 2005.

=== Act II: Hyakkin (百禽~時を渡る) ===
(百禽~時を渡る, Hyakkin: toki o wataru, lit. "Hundred-Bird: Across Time")
Open Your Mind episode available from May 25 until July 24, 2005.

==== Like a video game ====
This act features sequences with a moving crosshair appearing on top of the 3-panel panoramic screen and locking onto flying creatures that explode in a myriad of polygons when fired upon. This presentation is close to the principle opening stage of the Panzer Dragoon 1995 classic and revolutionary Fantasy/SF 3D shooting game which had a similar use of a 180° screen, dragon back flights, shooting of fantasy flying creatures through a similar crossair and was packed with a New Age score. Mamoru Oshii is an enthusiast gamer playing games such as Wizardry and Virtua Fighter. In 2001 he envisioned a "living by the game concept" in the live-action film Avalon.

=== Act III: Ku-Nu (狗奴~未生の記憶) ===
lit. "Dog Being: Remembrance of Seedling"
Open Your Mind episode available from July 25 until September 25, 2005.

==== Answers ====
In this concluding act the viewer gets answers about the origins and nature of the mysterious creatures met in the forest. These were made through scientific achievements as the civilization was actually human and used nanomachines to modify DNA sections in order to create new hybrid beings; the anthropomorph animals.

==== Controversy ====
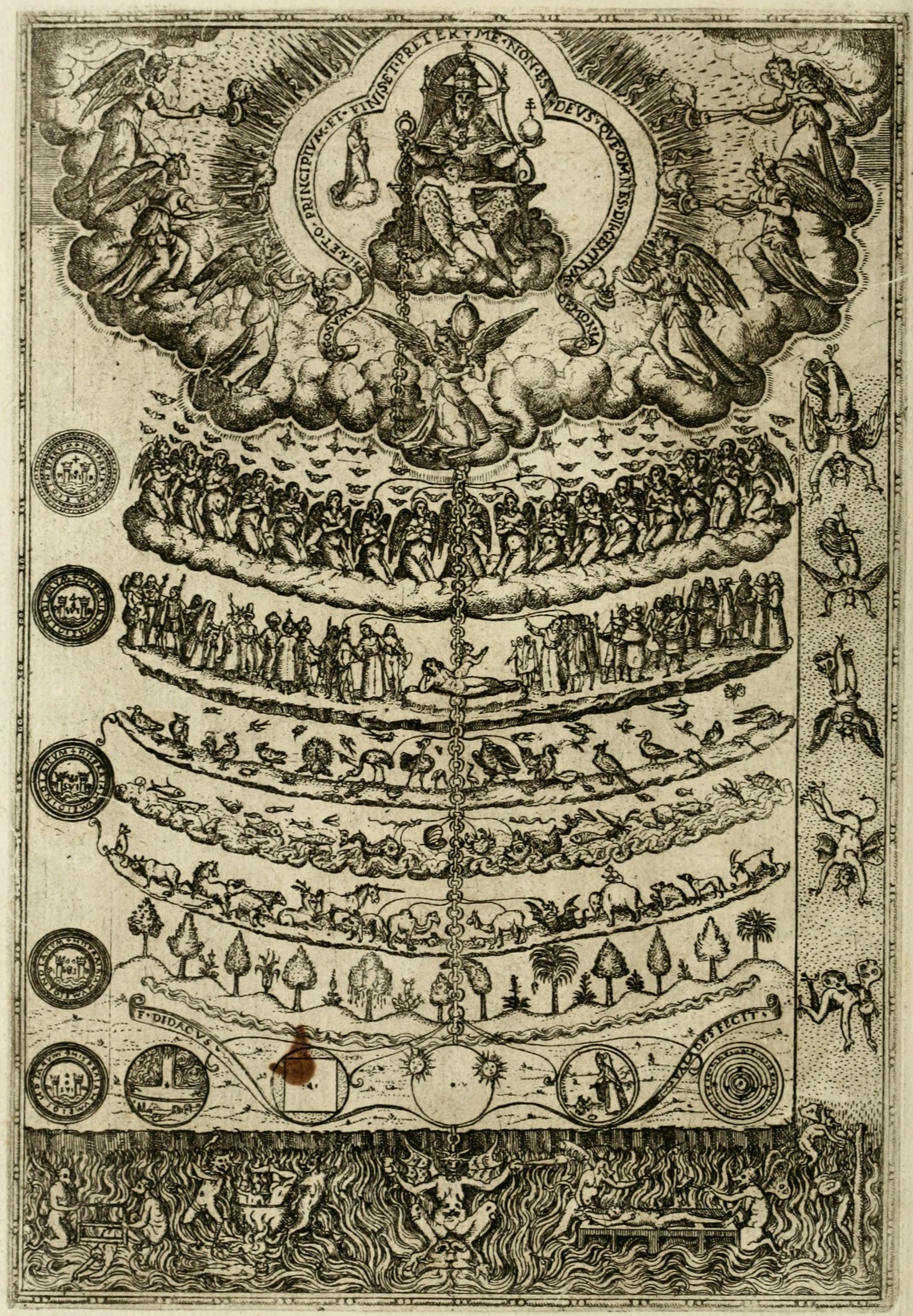
The Great chain of being separates the humans from the animals.

Ku-nu features a controversial sequence morphing human newborns with puppies. The shock comes less from the creation of a human-dog hybrid race through genetical modifications than from the explicit visual presentation of human and dog newborns as equals through morphing.

For both ethic, philosophical and religious concerns human genetic manipulations such as cloning are forbidden and a touchy subject, or sometimes a taboo matter, in many countries in Europe and North America while not so in other parts of the globe.

Even though the conception of dog has evolved since Descartes' perception and depiction of animals as just "mechanical beings", toward the modern recognition of a more complex nature as argued by the animal rights theory, there is a mostly Western conceptual difference between animals and humans, hence an established hierarchy that means dogs are still considered in some human societies as food, disposable, caged, experimental subjects or used in military warfare such as the mine-dogs (hundminen). On other hand, according to modern philosophers, the psychoanalyst Françoise Dolto and some psychologists such as Didier Pleux the baby figure has become the only remaining holy figure of agnostic societies which sums up the concept of "l'Enfant-Roi" or "enfant Roi" (French for "Boy King" literally "Child King"). The 20th century saw the rise and crowning of the Child King which became apparent through various protection measures such as the abolition of child work, the creation of various child care and protection associations, and even the international Convention on the Rights of the Child created in 1989 and applied the following year.

In 1995 Mamoru Oshii invited viewers of Ghost in the Shell to open their mind and think about a new social and legal status for autonomous, evolved Artificial Intelligence creatures. Now, ten years later, his Ark of Awakening work evokes a similar reflection about genetically modified beings and by extension to the status of animals.

=== Intermission: Pan (epilogue) ===
This second filmed part shows the theater as the silk curtains opens to reveal Pan. The last scene is a return to the now deserted forest.

== Releases ==
The pavilion included an Open Your Mind souvenir shop selling figures, books, keyholders, pamphlets, posters, soundtrack CD and the limited premium DVD "Special Edition".

=== Book ===
- 2005.04.DD: 汎ちゃんの玉: Gem in the Pan, art book

Mamoru Oshii (text) / Tetsuya Nishio (illus.), Be-next (15.5cm, 32p., color) ISBN 4-906069-39-8

=== Audio ===
- 2005.08.24: めざめの方舟 Open Your Mind: Original Soundtrack, OST CD

Kenji Kawai, (SVWC7283) Aniplex / Sony Music Dist.

=== Video ===
- 2005.04.DD: めざめの方舟 Open Your Mind: Special Edition, 1DVD (limited)

(ANZB1195) Aniplex

- 2005.08.24: めざめの方舟 Open Your Mind: Complete Edition, 2DVD

(ANSB1061~2) Aniplex / Sony Pictures Ent. (110 min. making of bonus disc, color booklet)

=== Toy ===
- 2005.04.DD: 六将フィギュア (靑鰉・百禽・狗奴) ("Riki-Shou figure: Sho-Ho, Hyakkin, Ku-Nu"), 1/12 polystone painted figure (22 cm)

Poppy (Bandai-Namco Group)

== Quotes ==
- Mamoru Oshii, about his upcoming work (September 2004)

"I decided to take this offer because I wanted to work on something other than films.I am waiting to get the final products for display, the images to show on the monitors from the vendors....Everything should be completed no later than the end of this year....I created the concept of the entire project and I supervised all the designs. I did basically the same thing that a director would do to make a film."

== Staff ==
- Direction supervision: Mamoru Oshii (押井 守)
- Producer: Atsushi Kubo (久保 淳), Masuo Ueda, Tomonori Ochikoshi
- Direction: Hiroyuki Hayashi (林 弘幸)
- Music: Kenji Kawai (川井 憲次)
- Arts: Toshihiro Isomi (磯見 俊裕)
- Technical director：Yasuhiro Yamaguchi (山口 泰弘)
- Character design: Jun Suemi (末弥 純)
- Ceiling iron modelling work: 大澤 克俊
- Ceiling doll (Pan): 品田 冬樹
- Floor dolls (Riki-Shou): 秋山 直樹
- Egg shape screen production: 敷山 哲洋
- Silk curtain installation work: 川辺 幸雄 / 秋山 清次
- Project manager: 上田 寛次 / 西川 鉄也
- Technical producer: 土田 稔
- Sound & visual engineer: 佐藤 茂夫
- Lighting director: 高嶋 正明
- CG producer: 塩田 周三
- Acoustic supervision: Kazuhiro Wakabayashi (若林 和弘)
- Sound supervisor: 井上 秀司
- Production manager: 黒田 仁子 / 村社 幸司
- Coordination production: Dentsuu Tech
- Distribution: Deiz
- Theme zone exhibitors: Sekisui House, Chubu Nippon Broadcasting, Tokai Television Broadcasting, The Chunichi Shimbun
