= Tina Ann =

American singer

- Born: Tina Ann Amato
- Genres: House; Eurodance; dance-pop
- Occupations: Singer; songwriter
- Years active: 2000–present
- Labels: Kult; Heart
- Website: Official website

Tina Ann Amato is a United States classically trained vocalist from Long Island, New York, who has had success on the Hot Dance Music/Club Play and Hot Dance Airplay charts. Under her full name of Tina A. Amato, she writes much of her own material, her music fitting into the dance-pop and Eurodance genres.

In 2000, she hit number 1 with "Don't Want Another Man", produced by Dynamix. She then had several hits on her own: "In My Dreams" (#22 in 2001) and "I Do" (#10 in 2003). Her hit single, "Rise Again" followed in 2005. All of her singles are included in her 2003 album Situations, involving various producers, such as The Orange Factory and her father, Sal Amato, as executive producer.

Her version of Mike + The Mechanics' "All I Need Is a Miracle" is included in the 2004 release by Bad Boy Joe, The Best of NYC Vocal Clubhouse: 1 AM Sessions, which also features performances by Deborah Cox and Melanie C, among others.

== Discography ==
=== Albums ===
- Situations (Heart Records, 2003)

=== Singles ===
- "Don't Want Another Man"
- "I Do"
- "In My Dreams"
- "Too Late"
- "All I Need Is a Miracle"
- "Rise Again"

== See also ==
- List of number-one dance hits (United States)
- List of artists who reached number one on the US Dance chart
