= Brainbug =

Italian music producer and guitarist

- Bertapelle and Casari in what would become the cover image for "Rain"

Background information
- Also known as: Alzheimers; Brainbug; Corn On The Cob; Deep Deed; Dr. Albert; Drumscape; Evil Trax; Humdrum; Ice Cube; Isaac; Notator; Space Christ
- Born: Alberto Bertapelle; 23 December 1958; Ceggia, Italy
- Origin: Venice, Italy
- Died: 23 November 2016 (aged 57) Tavagnacco, Italy
- Genres: House, dance, trance
- Occupation: Musician
- Instrument: Guitar
- Years active: 1993–2016
- Labels: Media Records; Great Dane Records; Danceworks; EMI; Positiva; Volumex; Orbit Records; Strike Force; Groovilicious; Ultra Records

Alberto Bertapelle (23 December 1958 – 23 November 2016), better known by his stage name Brainbug, was an Italian symphonic electronic trance music producer and guitarist from Ceggia, Italy. He died during a concert in November 2016 at 57 years old.

== Early life ==
Alberto Bertapelle is from Ceggia, a town in the province of Venice. From the age of 13, he played in many local bands as a guitarist and as a keyboardist. He taught sound engineering at a musical academy he started, Support Music Academy.

== Career ==
During 1993–1994, Bertapelle worked for Media Records before opening his own recording studio where he started producing his own music. He also worked for Great Dane Records, for whom he has released many records. He later worked for Danceworks and signed to EMI in London.

He achieved mainstream success with the single "Nightmare" which was a top-ten hit in many countries, including the United Kingdom and the United States. The single also won the International Award WMC in Miami and was certified gold in Australia.

"Nightmare" appeared in the soundtrack of several films, such as Human Traffic, Playing by Heart and A Night at the Roxbury. It was played as the players of Manchester City appeared before the start of a match when they played at Maine Road, and is still used on the odd occasion at the Etihad Stadium to this day. It was also used during the second-half kick-off at Leeds United home games at Elland Road as well as being the entrance music for the 2013 Elite League Nottingham Panthers ice hockey team. The music video was directed by Tim Claxton and was inspired by 1950s science fiction films, and the films of Ed Wood.

Further singles, "The 8th Dwarf" (1997) and "Rain" (1998) took the formula established by "Nightmare" and "Benedictus" and explored some different areas. "Rain" features lyrics by Italian singer Nadia Casari, who also appears in the music video.

Several remixes by various artists have been released on Brainbug's singles, and not all of Bertapelle's originals are obviously titled. "Nightmare (Sinister Strings Mix)" and "Benedictus (Exitiale Mix)" are examples of this. The Maxi-CD release of "Rain" also features those original mixes, although "Benedictus (Exitiale Mix)", while not labeled as an edit, was edited slightly shorter.

Bertapelle has also added his symphonic trance touch to other artists' works through various remixes.

== Death ==
On 23 November 2016, Bertapelle died of a suspected heart attack at 57 years old while playing the guitar in a performance on stage during a concert in Tavagnacco of Udine, Italy. Despite having a group of nurses in the audience who performed CPR and an ambulance arriving shortly after, Bertapelle was pronounced dead.

== Discography ==
=== Compilation albums ===
| Title | Details |
|---|---|
| Miami Gold Night Collection | Released: 21 June 2012; Label: Attiva Sas; Format: Digital download, CD |

=== Singles ===
| Year | Title | Peak chart positions | | | | | | |
| Year | Title | AUS | IRE | NED | SCO | UK | US Club Play | US Dance Sales |
|---|---|---|---|---|---|---|---|---|
| 1997 | "Nightmare" | 14 | 15 | 47 | 10 | 11 | 4 | 14 |
| 1997 | "Benedictus" | 77 | 25 | — | 26 | 24 | 2 | 17 |
| 1997 | "The 8th Dwarf" | — | — | — | — | — | — | — |
| 1998 | "Rain" | — | — | — | — | — | 4 | 35 |
| 1999 | "Nightmare" (remix) | — | — | — | — | 98 | — | — |
| 2004 | "Nightmare" (re-issue) | — | — | — | 66 | 63 | — | — |
"—" denotes items that did not chart or were not released in that territory.

=== Remixes ===
- "The Age Of Love" – Age Of Love (1990; remix 1998)
- "Ever Rest" – Mystica (1998)
- "SuperSonic" – Music Instructor featuring. The Flying Steps (1999)
- "Rock Your Body" – Music Instructor (1999)
- "Another Day" – Skip Raiders Feat. Jada (2000)
