= Georg O. Luksch =

Austrian remixer and producer

Background information
- Also known as: Club 69
- Born: Vienna, Austria
- Origin: Vienna, Austria
- Genres: Tribal house; progressive house
- Occupations: Keyboardist; remixer; producer; composer; mix engineer
- Instruments: Keyboards; Percussion; sampler

Georg O. Luksch is an Austrian musician, remixer, composer and producer.

His father, Georg Luksch, a composer, introduced him to the piano at the age of four. When he began taking lessons at the age of five he also started to experiment with tape machines and editing, which would influence his use of recorded sound as a music instrument. In the following years Luksch developed his piano skills while exploring music on his own with recording equipment and hand-built electronic circuits.

Luksch and Peter Rauhofer became famous for working as a remixer-team under the moniker Club 69 for a variety of remixes and they won the Grammy Award in 2000 for Grammy Award for Remixer of the Year, Non-Classical for remixing five songs by: Cher's "Believe", Madonna "Nothing Really Matters", Whitney Houston "It's Not Right but It's Okay", Everything But The Girl, "Five Fathoms", Donna Summer "I Will Go with You".

In 2001 they were nominated for a second Grammy Award for remixes of songs by: Whitney Houston "Greatest Love Of All", Tony Braxton "He Wasn't Man Enough", Pet Shop Boys "I Don't Know What You Want", Jessica Simpson "I Think I'm in Love", Filter "Take a Picture". In 2003 they were nominated again for the remix of Christina Aguilera "Beautiful".

The List of work contains a number of Madonna's songs including, "American Life", "Nothing Fails", "Nobody Knows Me", "Get Together", "Impressive Instant" and "4 Minutes", as well as her collaboration with Britney Spears, "Me Against the Music". They also provided remixes for Britney Spears, Yoko Ono, Pink, Tori Amos, Pet Shop Boys, Depeche Mode, Yazoo, Kylie Minogue, Whitney Houston, Jessica Simpson, Frankie Goes to Hollywood, Duran Duran and Mariah Carey, Filter, Book of Love, Soft Cell, Angie Stone, among others.

Luksch is Professor for Media Music / Music Production at the JAM MUSIC LAB Private University for Jazz and Popular Music Vienna an Austrian private university located in the Music City Gasometer in the 11th district of Vienna, Austria. He is also holding workshops for Electronic Music Production EMP and Analog Sound Design ASD for the company Akademie-Media in Vienna. Luksch is also running a recording studio in Vienna and producing artists in various genres and holds the position as musical director of theater Ensemble21 with regular premieres at Gleis 21 in Vienna, where he composes for productions like The Little Prince from Antoine de Saint-Exupéry.
