= Don't Want Another Man =

Single by Dynamix featuring Tina Ann

from the album Rhythm Beatdown (Dynamix album) and Situations (Tina Ann album)
- Released: 2000
- Genre: Electronic, progressive house
- Length: 7:45
- Label: Kult Records/Star 69 Records
- Songwriter(s): Adrianne Harkins; Eddie Cumana; Jeremy Skaller
- Producer(s): Eddie Cumana; Jeremy Skaller; Peter Rauhofer; Lilla Vietri

Dynamix featuring Tina Ann singles chronology
"Don't Want Another Man" (2000)	"Never Get Me" (2000)

"Don't Want Another Man" is a 2000 song recorded by the American group Dynamix featuring vocalist Tina Ann, taken from the Dynamix debut album Rhythm Beatdown, and later featured on Tina Ann's 2003 album Situations.

The track marked the act's first number-one single on Billboard's Dance Club Songs Chart. The single was written and produced by Eddie Cumana and Jeremy Skaller (the duo behind Dynamix), and Adrianne Harkins, with additional co-production by Peter Rauhofer (for his Star 69 Records) and Lilla Vietri (for Kult Records). The song originally featured Adrianne Harkins on vocals, when it was released to the clubs on promo but later re-recorded with Tina Ann.

== Track listings ==
CD maxi (US)

- 1 "Don't Want Another Man" (Dynamix Radio Edit) 4:00
- 2 "Don't Want Another Man" (Dynamix Original Club Mix) 7:45
- 3 "Don't Want Another Man" (Victor Calderone's Roxy Anthem) 11:55
- 4 "Don't Want Another Man" (E.G. Mediterranean Club Mix) 6:35
- 5 "Don't Want Another Man" (Peter Doesn't Want Another Mix) 10:20
- 6 "Don't Want Another Man" (E.G. Mediterranean Dub) 6:35
- 7 "Don't Want Another Man" (Beats A La Dynamix) 3:00
