= Mystica (band) =

Mystica is a Goa trance project from Israel, and consists of Avi Peer, Joseph Master and Charlie Ben-moha.

== History ==
The members of Mystica have been working together making trance music since 1996. They come from the town of Ashdod in the south of Israel. On Israeli Independence Day in 1997, Paul Oakenfold arrived in Israel with the Perfecto Fluoro tour, and played Mystica's song "Ever Rest" twice that night in the Cinerama Club, and several days later Perfecto contacted BNE. In February 1998, "Ever Rest" was released on a single on Perfecto with two remixes (by Brainbug and Tour De-Force). The single was a big success and entered the charts in Britain. Following that success the group started to work on a second single and in May that year Perfecto released a second single from them, "African Horizon". The single featured two mixes by X-Cabs and another track "Bliss", which became a big hit. The single again entered the UK chart, peaking higher than "Ever Rest". The group also released an album on Purple Trance/Planet Music in 1997 under the name One Man Game: Total Trance.

Mystica's tracks have been included on a number of compilations, including: Paul Oakenfold's 2 Years of Cream, Pete Tong's Essential Collection, Global Clubbing (mixed by DJ Tiësto), Paul Oakenfold's Global Underground 007: New York, Israel's Psychedelic Trance Vol. 1, Israel's Psychedelic Trance Vol. 2, Future Trax, Destination Israel, Trance Mix 7 and Spiritual Moves. For more than a year Mystica worked on their album with BNE and the resulting album, Age of Innocence, was released in July 1999 on BNE/Dragonfly/Cosmophilia and also as a double LP. They also released a single from the album titled "China". Their second album, Second Dive was released in 2009.

The sound that Mystica pioneered, a combination of psychedelic and classic trance with elements of folk and rock, has been credited with helping to bring the genre of Goa trance to worldwide attention.

== Discography ==
=== Albums ===
- Age of Innocence (1999)
- Second Dive (2009)

=== Singles ===
- "Ever Rest" (1998) - UK #62
- "African Horizon" (1998) - UK #59
