= Murk (band) =

American house music production team

- Origin: Miami, Florida, U.S.
- Genres: House
- Years active: 1991–present
- Labels: Murk Records, TRIBAL America/IRS/EMI, TWISTED America/MCA, Tommy Boy, Nervous
- Members: Ralph Falcón; Oscar Gaetan; Tamara Wallace
- Past members: Pamala Williams

Murk (also known by several other names, including Funky Green Dogs) is a house-music production team composed of Ralph Falcón and Oscar Gaetan. They formed in Miami in 1991. The group had seven consecutive singles that topped Billboard's Hot Dance Music/Club Play chart.

== Career ==
Murk is one of the most influential music acts in house music. It has a vast back catalog of compositions dating from the early 1990s, including "Some Lovin'", "Reach For Me", "Been a Long Time" and "Every Now and Then," and many newer tracks such as "Fired Up!" (No. 80 on the Billboard Hot 100), "The Way," "Dark Beat," "Doesn't Really Matter," and "Believe." Murk also performed as Funky Green Dogs. The label worked with several vocalists, including Pamala Williams, Tamara Wallace and more.

Gaetan and Falcón also released songs under the names Liberty City and Oscar G & Ralph Falcón. The latter also recorded solo as the Fog and Gaetan as Oscar G and Dynamo Electrix. Murk is also credited for a remix of "Fever" by Madonna on the 12-inch single of the same name. Murk also remixed songs for Pet Shop Boys, Donna Summer, Dannii Minogue, Seal, Britney Spears, Jennifer Lopez, Moby, Depeche Mode, Daft Punk, Royksopp, Groove Armada, RuPaul, Spice Girls, Olive, Moloko, Erasure, Adeva, Danny Tenaglia, David Guetta, Lonnie Gordon, David Morales, Jestofunk and many more.

Murk scored a major hit in 1996 called "Fired Up" with American singer Pamala Williams.

In addition, Ralph and Oscar have established themselves as skilled DJs, being in demand around the world at clubs such as Space, the various Crobar nightclubs, the various Pacha venues, and many others. Both of them continue to create hits both together and as solo artists.

== Discography ==
=== Albums ===
- 1993 The Singles Collection, as Murk
- 1993 The Remix Collection, as Murk
- 1996 Get Fired Up, as Funky Green Dogs
- 1998 Miami Deep, as Murk
- 1999 Star, as Funky Green Dogs
- 2002 Super California, as Funky Green Dogs
- 2003 Murk, as Murk

=== Singles ===
Murk/MURK

- 1993 "Bugged Out," as Murk in Association with the Big Bang (with Ian Tregoning)
- 1998 "Reach For Me '98"
- 2002 "Some Lovin'" (with Kristine W)
- 2003 "All Right"
- 2003 "Believe" (with Tamara Wallace)
- 2004 "Time" (with Greg Chin)
- 2005 "Doesn't Really Matter" (with Jennifer Carbonell)

Funky Green Dogs
With Pamala Williams from 1995 to 1998, with Tamara Wallace from 1998 to the present

- 1992 "Reach For Me," as Funky Green Dogs From Outer Space (with Shauna Solomon)
- 1994 "High Up", as Funky Green Dogs From Outer Space (with Club Z)
- 1996 "Fired Up!"
- 1997 "The Way"
- 1998 "Some Kind Of Love"
- 1998 "Until The Day"
- 1999 "Body"
- 1999 "Can't Help It"
- 2001 "Super California"
- 2001 "You Got Me (Burnin' Up)"
- 2002 "Rise Up"
- 2005 "Reach for Me 2005"
- 2007 "Reach for Me 2007"

Oscar G & Ralph Falcon

- 2002 "Dark Beat" (with OBA Frank Lords)
- 2002 "Circles" (promo only)
- 2005 "Dark Beat 2005" (with OBA Frank Lords)
- 2007 "Classics Volume 1"
- 2008 "Classics Volume 2"

Deep South

- 1993 "Believe"
- 1997 "Lemon Puff"
- 1997 "Untitled/Monday Air"
- 2000 "Deepin' You," as MN2s meets Deep South (with David Elkabas)
- 2001 "Tribal America"

Liberty City

- 1992 "Some Lovin'" (with Bebe Dozier)
- 1994 "If You Really Love Someone" (with Shauna Solomon)
- 1995 "That's What I Got" (with Shauna Solomon)
- 2008 "If You Really Love Someone 2008" (with Shauna Solomon)

Interceptor

- 1992 "Together"
- 1993 "Higher Love"
- 1994 "Together '94"

Other aliases

- 1992 "U Got Me," as Intruder (with Carlos Fernandez)
- 1992 "Release Myself," as Coral Way Chiefs (with George Pugh)
- 1994 "Just Wanna Love You," as Ralph, Oscar, & Me (with Aldo Hernandez)
- 1995 "Pain," as Fury (with Chantel)
- 2012 "Amame," as "Intruder" (with JEI)

Production for other artists

- 1993 Marcy Lee—"Fever"
- 1993 Bobby Pruit—"Tried So Hard"

=== Charts ===
Year	Song	Peak chart positions										
Year	Song	UK	US	US Club/Dance	US Dance Airplay	US Dance Singles Sales	AUS	BEL (FL)	BEL (Tip) (FL)	BEL (WA)	NLD	NZ
1996	"Fired Up!"	17	80	2	—	1	—	1	—	11	40	—
1997	"The Way"	43	—	1	—	6	—	42	—	—	—	—
1997	"Some Kind of Love"	—	—	—	—	28	—	—	—	—	—	—
1998	"Changes"	—	—	1	—	35	—	—	—	—	—	—
1998	"Until the Day"	75	—	1	—	7	—	—	—	—	—	—
1998	"Reach For Me"	84	—	—	—	—	—	—	—	—	—	—
1999	"Body"	46	—	1	—	12	55	—	18	—	—	43
2000	"Can't Help It"	100	—	33	—	22	—	—	—	—	—	—
2002	"You Got Me (Burnin' Up)"	—	—	1	—	21	—	—	—	—	—	—
2002	"Rise Up"	—	—	1	—	—	—	—	—	—	—	—
2003	"Some Lovin'" featuring Kristine W	—	—	1	20	5	110	—	—	—	—	—
2003	"All Right"	—	—	1	—	—	126	—	—	—	—	—
2003	"Dark Beat"	—	—	1	5	—	—	—	—	—	—	—
2004	"Believe"	—	—	1	—	18	—	—	—	—	—	—
2004	"Time"	—	—	1	—	21	—	—	—	—	—	—
2005	"Doesn't Really Matter"	—	—	6	30	12	—	—	—	—	—	—
