= Livin' for Love =

2000 single performed by Natalie Cole

"Livin' for Love" is a 2000 single from the album Natalie Cole: Greatest Hits, Vol. 1, and was written by Natalie Cole, Garianno Lorenzo and Denise Rich. Livin' for Love was also the title of a 2000, TV film, based on Natalie Cole's life. The single was Natalie Cole's second number one on the US dance charts after her hit cover of "Pink Cadillac" from her album Everlasting (1987); additionally, it was the first time in ten years that she placed a single on the dance charts after her contribution to the Pretty Woman soundtrack, "Wild Women Do", peaked at number eight in 1990.

== Remixes ==
"Livin for Love" did not place on any other charts, but several remixes were released:

- Livin' For Love (Hex HQ2 Club Mix) Producer [Additional] – Mack Quayle*Remix – HQ2Remix [Credited To] – Hex Hector-8:55
- Livin' For Love (Acapella)-4:37
- Livin' For Love (Frankie Knuckles Classic Club Mix)-Remix, Producer [Additional] – Frankie Knuckles-8:11
- Livin' For Love (Hex HQ2 Instrumental), Producer [Additional] – Mack Quayle. Remix – HQ2 Remix [Credited To] – Hex Hector-4:14
- Livin' For Love (Hex HQ2 Radio Mix), Producer [Additional] – Mack Quayle. Remix – HQ2 Remix [Credited To] – Hex Hector-4:15
- Livin' For Love (Frankie Knuckles Classic Instrumental)-Remix, Producer [Additional] – Frankie Knuckles-6:53
- Livin' For Love (Frankie Knuckles Dubbin' 4 Love)-Remix, Producer [Additional] – Frankie Knuckles-7:09

== See also ==
- List of number-one dance singles of 2000 (U.S.)
