= Flying Steps =

German breakdancing group

- Origin: Berlin, Germany
- Genres: Street dance (B-boying, popping, locking)
- Years active: 1993–present
- Members: Kadir Memis; Benny Kimoto; Khaled Chaabi; Gengis Ademoski; Stephanie Nguyen; Michael Rosemann; Vartan Bassil; Niran; Brahim Zaibat
- Website: www.flying-steps.de

The Flying Steps is a B-boy crew formed in 1993 by Kadir Memis ("Amigo") and Vartan Bassil in Berlin. The crew has nine members. They specialise in B-boying (breakdance), popping and locking and were world champions in these dance styles several times by winning the international Battle of the Year and the Red Bull Beat Battle. Nowadays the crew also include Hip Hop and House dance forms in their performances.

The Flying Steps gained a lot of entertainment, theater and media experience during their career. They founded their own music label and started different successful music projects. The Flying Steps are considered to be one of the most successful urban dance acts worldwide.

Their single Operator was released on 1 June 2007. They worked on two different B-Boy PlayStation games and they opened a dance school, the Flying Steps Academy Berlin, where they teach the next generation of urban dance.

Under the artistic direction of Christoph Hagel, in 2010 they presented the dance performance Red Bull Flying Bach, with breakdance and contemporary dance to the music The Well-Tempered Clavier by Johann Sebastian Bach. This routine was performed at the Bundestag, the 2011 Eurovision Song Contest and the Federal Presidency's Summer Festival, and it was given a special Echo award.

== Championships ==
- 2005: TauHunterTheBest / London – 1st Place
- 2007: TauHunterTheBest / London – 1st Place
- 2007: TauHunterTheBest / Paris – 1st Place
- 2008: TauHunterTheBest / Paris – 1st Place

== Members ==
- "Amigo" – Kadir Memis
- "Benny" – Benny Kimoto
- "KC-1" – Khaled Chaabi
- "Lil'Ceng" – Gengis Ademoski
- "Lil'Steph" – Stephanie Nguyen
- "Crazy B" – Michael Rosemann
- "Vartan" – Vartan Bassil
- "Lil Rock" – Niranh Chanthabouasy
- "Brahim" – Brahim Zaibat

== Discography ==
=== Singles ===
- "In Da Arena / We Gonna Rock It" (2000)
- "We Are Electric" (2000)
- "Breakin' It Down" (2001)
- "We Gonna Rock It" (2001)
- "Operator" (2007)
- "Let it Rain" (2009)

=== Albums ===
- B-Town (2001)
- Greatest Hits (2002)
- Breakdance Battle (2005)

== Videography ==
- The Age of Love (Music Instructor) (1990–1998)
- Super Sonic (Music Instructor) (1998)
- Rock Your Body (Music Instructor) (1998)
- Get Freaky (with Music Instructor) (1998)
- In Da Arena (2000)
- We Are Electric (2000)
- Breakin' It Down (2001)
- We Gonna Rock It (2001)
- Operator (2007)
- Let it Rain (2009)

== See also ==
- List of dancers
