= Cevin Fisher =

American house music record producer (1963–2026)

Background information
- Born: Kevin Fisher; October 26, 1963; East Orange, New Jersey, U.S.
- Died: October 29, 2026 (aged 63) Prévessin-Moëns, Ain, France
- Genres: House, dance
- Occupations: DJ, record producer
- Years active: 1996–2026

Cevin Fisher (born Kevin Fisher, October 26, 1963 – October 29, 2026) was an American house music DJ and record producer.

== Life and career ==
Kevin Fisher was born in East Orange, New Jersey, on October 26, 1963.

He is best known for songs such as "The Freaks Come Out" (billed as Cevin Fisher's Big Freak) and "(You Got Me) Burning Up", the latter of which featured vocals by Loleatta Holloway. Fisher achieved five entries in the UK top 75 between October 1998 and February 2001.

Fisher died from cancer on October 29, 2026, at the age of 63.

== Discography ==
=== Albums ===
- Underground 2000 (2000)

=== Singles ===
Year	Song	UK
1998	"The Freaks Come Out" (billed as Cevin Fisher's Big Freak)	34
1999	"(You Got Me) Burnin' Up" (with Loleatta Holloway)	14
1999	"The Way We Used To"	97
1999	"Music Saved My Life"	67
2001	"It's a Good Life" (featuring Ramona Keller)	54
2001	"Love You Some More" (featuring Sheila Smith)	60
2001	"Loving You (When It Comes To)"	89
2004	"Magic" / "Touch My Body Up"	91

== See also ==
- List of number-one dance hits (United States)
- List of artists who reached number one on the US Dance chart
