= Dynamix (duo) =

Dynamix is an electronic and dance music duo consisting of producers Jeremy Skaller and Eddie Cumana. Their first hit, "Don't Want Another Man" (featuring singer Tina Ann) hit #1 on the Billboard Hot Dance Music/Club Play chart in 2000. They followed this with "Never Get Me", a #17 dance hit featuring singer Nina Eve.

In 2001, they remixed Toni Braxton's "Maybe" which achieved the #11 position on the Billboard Hot Dance Music/Club Play chart.

They went on to remix (alongside Junior Vasquez) Pink's "Stupid Girls" in 2006 which achieved the #19 position on the Billboard Hot Dance Music/Club Play chart. Later that year, they released "Movin On" by Jason Walker which achieved the #7 position on the Billboard Hot Dance Music/Club Play chart.

== See also ==
- List of number-one dance hits (United States)
- List of artists who reached number one on the US Dance chart
