= Club 69 =

American and Austrian music group

- Origin: New York, US; Vienna, Austria;
- Genres: House music
- Works: Adults Only (1994); Style (1997); Re-Styled (1999); Best Of (2004)
- Award: grammy award in 2000
- Members: Georg O. Luksch
- Past members: Peter Rauhofer

Club 69 is an American/Austrian house music group.

== History ==
The Austrian musicians Georg O. Luksch and Peter Rauhofer became famous for working as a remixer-team under the moniker Club 69 for a variety of remixes. Club 69 won the Grammy Award in 2000 for Grammy Award for Remixer of the Year, Non-Classical for remixing the following five songs: Cher's "Believe", Madonna "Nothing Really Matters", Whitney Houston "It's Not Right but It's Okay", Everything But The Girl, "Five Fathoms", Donna Summer "I Will Go with You".

In 2001 they were nominated for a second Grammy Award for remixing songs by: Whitney Houston "Greatest Love Of All", Tony Braxton "He Wasn't Man Enough", Pet Shop Boys "I Don't Know What You Want", Jessica Simpson "I Think I'm in Love", Filter "Take a Picture". In 2003 they were nominated again for the remix of Christina Aguilera "Beautiful".

The List of work contains a number of Madonna's songs including, "American Life", "Nothing Fails", "Nobody Knows Me", "Get Together", "Impressive Instant" and "4 Minutes", as well as her collaboration with Britney Spears, "Me Against the Music". They also provided remixes for Britney Spears, Yoko Ono, Pink, Tori Amos, Pet Shop Boys, Depeche Mode, Yazoo, Kylie Minogue, Whitney Houston, Jessica Simpson, Frankie Goes to Hollywood, Duran Duran and Mariah Carey, Filter, Book of Love, Soft Cell, Angie Stone, among others.

- 1994: Club 69 – Adults Only (Album)
- 1997: Club 69 – Style (Album)
- 1999: Club 69 – Re-Styled (Album)
- 2004: Club 69 – Best Of (Album)
