= List of nightclubs in New York City =

Touch nyc 2004-2012

This is a list of notable current and former nightclubs in New York City.

A 2015 survey of former nightclubs in the city identified 10 most historic ones, starting with the Cotton Club, active from 1923 to 1936.

- Area
- The Beatrice Inn (2006–2009)
- The Blue Angel
- Bond International Casino
- Bungalow 8 (2001–2009)
- Café Society (1938–1948)
- CBGB (1973–2006)
- Chateau Moderne (1930s)
- Club Cumming
- Connie's Inn
- Copacabana (1940–1992)
- Cotton Club (1923–1936)
- Crisco Disco
- Danceteria (1979–1986)
- El Morocco
- Electric Circus
- Fez
- Golden Gate Ballroom
- Half Note Club
- Hurrah
- Industry
- La Martinique
- Latin Quarter
- Limelight (1983–1990s)
- The Loft
- Mudd Club
- Nell's (1986–2004)
- Palladium (1976–1995)
- Paradise Garage
- Peppermint Lounge
- Private Eyes
- Pyramid Club
- The Q
- Regine's
- Riobamba
- The Roxy
- The Saint
- Santos Party House
- Savoy Ballroom
- The Sound Factory
- SOB's (Sounds of Brazil)
- Stork Club
- Studio 54 (1977–1991)
- Therapy
- The Tunnel (1986–2001)
- Twilo (1995–2001)
- The Village Gate
- The World
- Xenon

== See also ==
- Architecture of New York City
- List of buildings, sites, and monuments in New York City
- Music of New York City
