= If Madonna Calls =

1996 single by Junior Vasquez

Single by Junior Vasquez
- Released: June 7, 1996
- Studio: Lectrolux
- Genre: Electronic
- Length: 4:08
- Label: Groovilicious
- Songwriters: Junior Vasquez; Franklin Fuentes
- Producers: Junior Vasquez; Michael McDavid (exec.)

Junior Vasquez singles chronology
"Lift Me Up" (1995)	"If Madonna Calls" (1996)	"Ab Fab (I Am Thin and Gorgeous)" (1997)

"If Madonna Calls" is a song by American DJ and record producer Junior Vasquez, released as a single on June 7, 1996, by Groovilicious Records. The track includes a snippet of American singer Madonna's voice recorded from Vasquez's answering machine. It was composed after Madonna allegedly failed to appear at one of Vasquez's performances at the last minute. The singer never approved of the track and ended her professional relationship with Vasquez. The track received positive critical feedback and reached number two on the US Dance Club Play chart and number 24 on the UK Singles Chart.

== Background ==
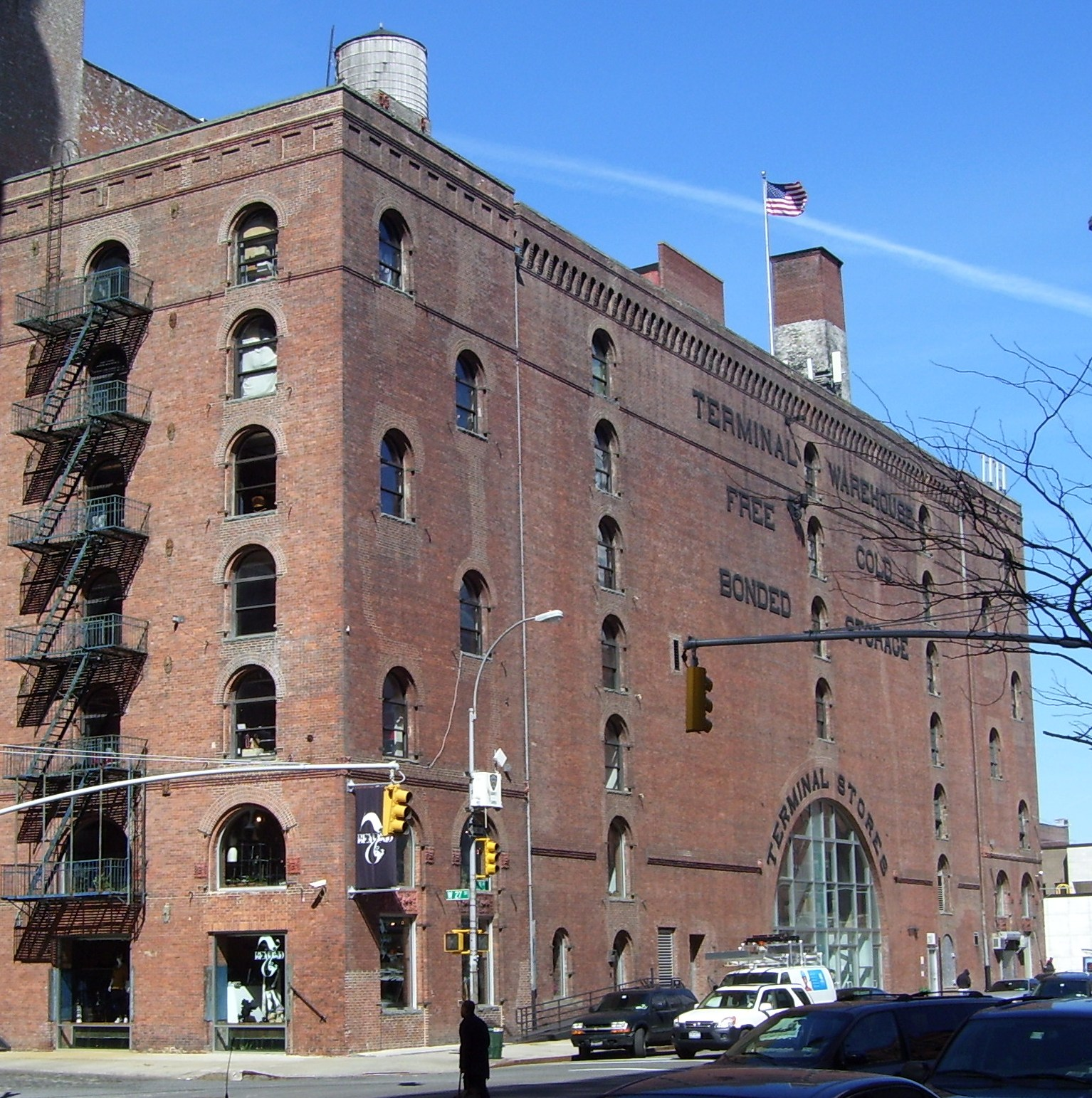
Madonna failed to appear during one of Vasquez's performances held at New York City nightclub Tunnel (pictured) at the last moment, which prompted the creation of "If Madonna Calls"

Junior Vasquez had introduced Madonna to vogue at The Sound Factory Bar in New York City. She became friends with the producer and was later inspired by the dance form to compose her 1990 single "Vogue". Vasquez remixed the singles from Madonna's 1994 studio album, Bedtime Stories, as well as composing many unreleased mixes. Vasquez referred to "If Madonna Calls" as a "bitch track", explaining it as "simply queens reading queens". The track was recorded at Lectrolux Studio and includes a snippet of Madonna's voice recorded from Vasquez's answering machine. The vocal loop repeats the phrases "Are you there?" and "Call me in Miami" while co-writer/artist Franklin Fuentes’ voice responds "Tell her I'm not here". Fred Jorio assisted Vasquez in the recording of the track, as well as programming and engineering it. Sound engineers Don Grossinger and Greg Vaughn also worked on the song. Tom Moulton did the audio mastering and the editing of the song, with Michael McDavid acting as executive producer. David K. Kessler designed the cover artwork of the CD single.

"If Madonna Calls" was released as a single by Groovilicious Records on June 7, 1996, in the United States and ten days later in the United Kingdom. On September 21, 2010, Vasquez released another four remixes of the song after teaming up with German producer duo Fisher & Fiebak. The song was reportedly produced after Madonna failed to appear during one of Vasquez's performances held at New York City nightclub Tunnel at the last moment. Although never confirmed, Madonna did not approve of Vasquez's actions, ending their professional relationship on bad terms. Chances for reconciliation are impossible according to Madonna's former longtime publicist Liz Rosenberg, who in a June 2003 news story in New York said "I can assure you that Madonna will never work with Junior again." Vasquez later worked for Madonna and remixed her 2003 single "Hollywood" for a Versace show in Milan. He had also tried to sell copies of his remix of Madonna's 2002 single "Die Another Day", but was stopped by the singer's legal representatives.

== Reception ==
Author Georges Claude Guilbert noted in his book, Madonna as Postmodern Myth, that the singer occupied a "privileged position" on the track. Along with the singer's vocals, there is other "playfully" sung and spoken commentary by Franklin Fuentes on the single. Guilbert theorized that previously when artists used music samples, they chose known figures like Winston Churchill, Sean Connery or Peter Sellers for commentary in the song. Similarly, using Madonna's voice as a sample in the song was an indication of her growing popularity.

Author John Walton Cotman noted in his book Cuban Transitions at the Millennium that many people in Miami would state that they were in close contact with Madonna. He believed the song was mocking them, with the main vocals in the track dismissing Madonna searching for Vasquez. Larry Flick from Billboard magazine gave positive feedback, calling it the most "anticipated electronic dance music release" of the time. Describing it as "irresistible", Flick commended Vasquez's production, as well as the remixes accompanying the original track, and hoped that the record label would release an edited version for radio programmers. According to Flick, the song also "triggered a transition into a career as an artist in his own right". Maria Jimenez from Music & Media described it as a "highly danceable track" and a "deep and wild house stomper".

"If Madonna Calls" was successful on the US Billboard Dance Club Play chart, where it reached a peak of number two on August 8, 1996, and was present on the chart for a total of 13 weeks. It also reached number eight on the Billboard Maxi-Singles Sales chart. In Canada, the song reached number seven on the RPM Dance chart. In the UK, the song debuted and peaked at number 24 on the UK Singles Chart, being present for just two weeks.

== Track listings ==
- Digital download
1. "If Madonna Calls" (X-Beat Mix) – 8:51
2. "If Madonna Calls" (JR's House Mix) – 8:40
3. "If Madonna Calls" (Lectro Dub) – 8:56
4. "If Madonna Calls" (Tribal Break) – 4:50
5. "If Madonna Calls" (X-Beat Instrumental) – 8:48
6. "If Madonna Calls" (JR's House Beats) – 4:05
- CD single
1. "If Madonna Calls" (X-Beat radio edit) – 4:07
2. "If Madonna Calls" (JR's House Mix radio edit) – 4:11
3. "If Madonna Calls" (X-Beat Mix) – 8:50
4. "If Madonna Calls" (Tribal Break) – 4:45
5. "If Madonna Calls" (JR's House Mix) – 8:40

== Personnel ==
Personnel are adapted from the liner notes of the CD single.

- Junior Vasquez – songwriter, production, recording
- Franklin Fuentes – songwriter, vocals, concept
- Fred Jorio – recording, programming, sound engineering
- Don Grossinger – engineering
- Greg Vaughn – engineering
- Michael McDavid – executive production
- Tom Moulton – mastering, editing
- Kelly Bienvenue – vocals
- David K. Kessler – cover art design

== Charts ==
=== Weekly charts ===
Weekly chart performance for "If Madonna Call"
Chart (1996)	Peak position
Canada Dance/Urban (RPM)	7
Israel (Israeli Singles Chart)	16
UK Singles (Official Charts)	24
UK Dance (Official Charts)	5
US Dance Club Songs (Billboard)	2
US Dance Singles Sales (Billboard)	8

=== Year-end charts ===
Year-end chart performance for "If Madonna Call"
Chart (1996)	Position
US Dance Club Play (Billboard)	12
US Maxi-Singles Sales (Billboard)	46
