= Cafe con Leche (Sunday party) =

Cafe con Leche vintage invitation

Cafe con Leche was a weekly Sunday night party held at various nightclubs in New York City. The party's span as a weekly event was over seven years and continues to be celebrated, with its 28th anniversary having taken place at The Q Club in New York City on Sunday, June 27, 2021. As a weekly, Cafe con Leche began at the Danceteria nightclub on January 1, 1993, and ended at Cheetah (formerly Sound Factory Bar) on July 11, 1999.

== History and legacy ==
Cafe con Leche was famous in New York nightlife for its iconic latin house and tribal house music and for its notorious, seductive "mixed crowd," which attracted all sexual identities and heritages. Many top producers, DJs, promoters, artists, celebrities, and personalities frequented the party. In addition, the night is recognized by many New York and non-New York nightclub veterans as the "best party" or "legendary" because of its lifespan, diverse crowd, and music.

== Nightclubs ==
The party was best known when it was at Club Expo (formerly Xenon), which was located at the historic Henry Miller's Theatre (now Stephen Sondheim Theatre) on 124 West 43rd Street, New York, NY (Times Square). On Sundays, Club Expo received large crowds well into the thousands, especially on holiday weekends. Often, this prompted street closure (between 6th Avenue and Broadway on 43rd Street) and heavy police activity. Although Club Expo received the highest attendance, the celebrated Sunday night fortified at Mr. Fuji's Tropicana, that was located on 13th Street and 5th Avenue in lower Manhattan. Other clubs Cafe con Leche held its weekly party include Supper Club, Speeed, Les Poulets, Cheetah (formerly Sound Factory Bar), Twirl, and Carbon.

== Music and dance ==
From the inception, Cafe con Leche hosted many renowned DJs including Lord G, Derrik Foxx, Kris Spirit, Merritt, Junior O, Hex Hector and Houdini; the first DJ to hold residency was Derrik Foxx. DJ Spin and Cuffy Cuff were original DJs on the other floors at Fuji's. Guest DJs would eventually include Danny Tenaglia, Little Louie Vega, Junior Vasquez, Jackie Christie, Teri Bristol, Kenny Carpenter, Roger Sanchez, Dmitry from Dee-lite, Troy Parrish, and Armand Van Helden. The music at Cafe con Leche started with house classics that later focused on latin house with the introduction of hard tribal house music. The party had two signature anthems, "It's Over," produced by Junior O and Prince Quick Mix, and "Cafe con Leche," produced by Junior O and John Kano; both tracks feature vocals by Joey Rolon. The bash also had a smaller hip hop and R&B community. This legion had a separate dance area at locations and usually blended with the main room congregation.

The dance floors of Cafe con Leche were often filled to capacity with dancers who excelled in Dance: Professional dancers, break dancers, voguers, and strippers. Many danced for long hours and other partygoers only spectated the plentiful dance "battles" that occurred. Accompanying dancing, occasional performances were held on stage by a variety of small dance companies, percussionists, and local house music entertainers.

== Demographics ==
The demographics of the crowd consisted of both young and older gay, straight, bisexual, and transsexual peoples. Although many races and ethnicities were present, a disproportionate number of Puerto Rican Americans patronized the party.

== Creators and key people ==
Cafe, as many called it, was started by Joseph Sheridan (Joey Sheridan or Joey S.) and Naudio Feliz. Numerous promoters and hosts affiliated with the party and helped maintain the unusual diversity, in particular, Lisa Collins and Diane Lloyd (production managers), Willi Ninja, Atom, E-man (Manager of Sound Factory), Louis M., Yamil Xtravaganza, Franklin Fuentes, Father Chris, Alonso (Soriano), Malvin(Colon Ramos), Peter Oasis, Cris AC, Robi Martin, Michael Kosh, Angel Melendez, Dalila, Asia, Bob Tillary, Steve Rodriguez, and Jason (Alvarez). The fashion illustrator, Alvaro, collaborated with the party from the beginning, and his artwork appeared on most of the invitations. Other visual artists that contributed to the party included Andre Charles and Alex Arcadia. Robert Hawkins, famously created a haunted house.

The Night had drag queen hostesses documenting and supporting the crowd via microphone; the original hostess was Perfidia (Steven Kirkham), followed by Joey Rolon. An example of this style of hosting can be obtained through the Cafe con Leche production entitled, "A Night At Cafe Con Leche," which released on April 29, 1997, on RCA, International. Guest drag hosts included Delores, Codie “Ravioli” Leone and HRH Princess Diandra. Guest door personalities included Jose Xtravaganza and Chanel Xtravaganza.

== Mission and support ==
From the beginning, Cafe con Leche's cultural mission was to create diversity and tolerance within the existing club scene. According to press interviews, the founder, Joey Sheridan, a Buddhist, believed he was responding to the spirit of Keith Haring, artist, when establishing the event. He saw in the Latin culture (that Cafe's partner, Naudio brought to the event,) a perfect cultural bridge. Also, the party associates its success from the support of the House of Xtravaganza and the House of Field. The party presented and supported diverse cultural arts, from dance troupes to spoken word artists, such as Emanuel Xavier.

== The last years ==
In the last years, Cafe con Leche divided into two parties: Cafe con Leche and Cafe Futuro. On July 21, 1998, a deadly scaffolding collapse on 4 Times Square (the Condé Nast Building) occurred, closing the Kit Kat Klub until September 1998. This same week, Cafe Futuro was born, holding its first event at the Carbon nightclub.

In the month of September 1998, Cafe con Leche ensued its weekly party at the Kit Kat Klub, facing restructuring obstacles and later moving to Speeed, a defunct nightclub located on 20 West 39th Street.

The new Cafe Futuro opted for Cheetah (formerly Sound Factory Bar) on 12 West 21st Street in the early Fall, remaining there until late May 1999, when displaced due to NYPD scrutiny. After its dismissal from Cheetah, it moved back to the Kit Kat Klub until June 27, 1999. Coincidentally, Cafe con Leche moved to Cheetah after Cafe Futuro's demise and held its last party on July 11, 1999.

Cafe Futuro traversed many venues during the Summer and Fall of 1999. It ended its last party on December 31, 1999, at the Spa nightclub (formerly System) on 76 East 13th Street. This last night was promoted with a flyer, in honor of Jesus Christ, that said 2000 A.D. and had a Caravaggio-like painting of Jesus Christ.

== Invites and distribution ==
The weekly party was known for its massive street distribution of flyers/invites, which was controlled by an affiliated promotion company called "Urban Works," that both created and promoted events at many New York City nightclubs. The invitations were usually different each week, and thousands of flyers/invites were collated and distributed throughout specific neighborhoods in Manhattan daily. The core distribution areas:

- Astor Place and Broadway
- Christopher Street and 7th Avenue
- 42nd Street and Broadway
- 8th Street between 6th Avenue and Broadway
- 19th Street and 8th Avenue

Furthermore, invites were left at essential businesses, which included record shops and boutiques. During the late nights and early mornings (1:30 a.m. - 6:30 a.m.+), the prints were circulated both outside and inside nightclubs such as Tunnel, Roxy, Limelight, Palladium, Carbon, Club USA, Sound Factory (46th Street), and Twilo.

== See also ==
- LGBTQ culture in New York City
