= Casey Stratton =

American musician (born 1976)

- Born: Casey Patrick Stratton; October 16, 1976 (age 49); Lansing, Michigan, U.S.
- Genres: Rock
- Occupations: Musician, songwriter, producer
- Instruments: Piano, guitar, violin, cello, vocals
- Years active: 1990–present (solo career)
- Label: Sleeping Pill Music
- Website: Casey Stratton's sofficial website Casey Stratton on myspace

Casey Stratton (born October 16, 1976) is a pop/rock singer, songwriter, and musician.

== Early life and education ==
Casey Stratton was born in Lansing, Michigan in 1976. He has lived in Los Angeles, California, Chicago, Illinois and New York City. Stratton currently resides in Grand Rapids, Michigan.

Beginning violin lessons at the age of 8, Stratton also took lessons in the cello, piano, and guitar. After graduating from Michigan's Interlochen Arts Academy, Stratton moved to Los Angeles to pursue his career. His first album release on a major label was "Standing at the Edge" for Sony Music Entertainment.

== Career ==
Casey first performed his own songs live while attending Interlochen Arts Academy at the age of 16. After moving to Los Angeles in 1995, Casey signed an independent recording contract with Magic Records. His first full-length release, The Giver and the Grave Digger, was released in 1996. In late 1995 Magic Records released Driving to the Moon EP.

In 1997, Casey began his first self-produced album, Lily Sleeps. The songs from Lily Sleeps gained some industry attention and Casey signed a publishing contract with Rondor Music Publishing in 1997. It was during this time that Casey began recording Whirlwind Medusa. This is also when the first recordings of future favorites Hollow and House of Jupiter were completed. In 1999 Casey was informed that his contract with Rondor Music Publishing would not be renewed. In the summer of 2000 Stratton moved to Chicago where he began a nearly two-year hiatus from the record industry. He immersed himself in writing and recorded an independent album called The Winter Children. Many of these tracks were re-recorded later and included on his Sony release Standing at the Edge.

In 2002, after moving to New York City, Stratton agreed a deal with Sony Music. In January 2003 he began recording Standing at the Edge with producer Patrick Leonard. The album was delayed, ultimately released on January 20, 2004.

After Standing at the Edge, Stratton gained further success when the Junior Vasquez remix of "House Of Jupiter" went to #1 on the Billboard Dance chart, and remained there for 20 weeks in 2005. This was followed by Vazquez's remix of "Blood". Casey left Sony Music in December 2004. Stratton's 6th studio album, "DIVIDE", was released in October 2005 on Stratton's independent label, Sleeping Pill Music (ASCAP). In 2006 Casey recorded and released the albumThe Sun is Burning.

The DIVIDE tour started on March 18, 2006, in Chicago, IL and completed all the East Coast dates with a performance in Atlanta. The West Coast portion of the tour began on April 27, 2006, in Los Angeles, California, ending in Portland, Oregon on May 6, 2006. A summer tour began on July 18, 2006, in Cleveland, OH and ended in Savannah, GA on July 28, 2006.

Stratton's album, The Crossing, was released in April 2007. A tour was being planned but was eventually scrapped due to financial concerns.

Casey's album, Orbit, was digitally released on February 5, 2008. This was followed by Signs of Life which was digitally released in August 2008 and physically released on CD in November. Messages Sending digitally released in April 2009.

Memories and Photographs was released in September 2009, followed by A Winter Moon, an album of holiday music, in December 2009. Casey's next project, Myth & Stars, largely based on Greek Mythology, was released on September 21, 2010. A live DVD, Live at the Wealthy Theatre, was released in 2010 as well.

== See also ==
- List of number-one dance hits (United States)
- List of artists who reached number one on the US Dance chart
