= Industry Bar =

Gay bar and nightclub in Manhattan, New York City

Industry
- Logo

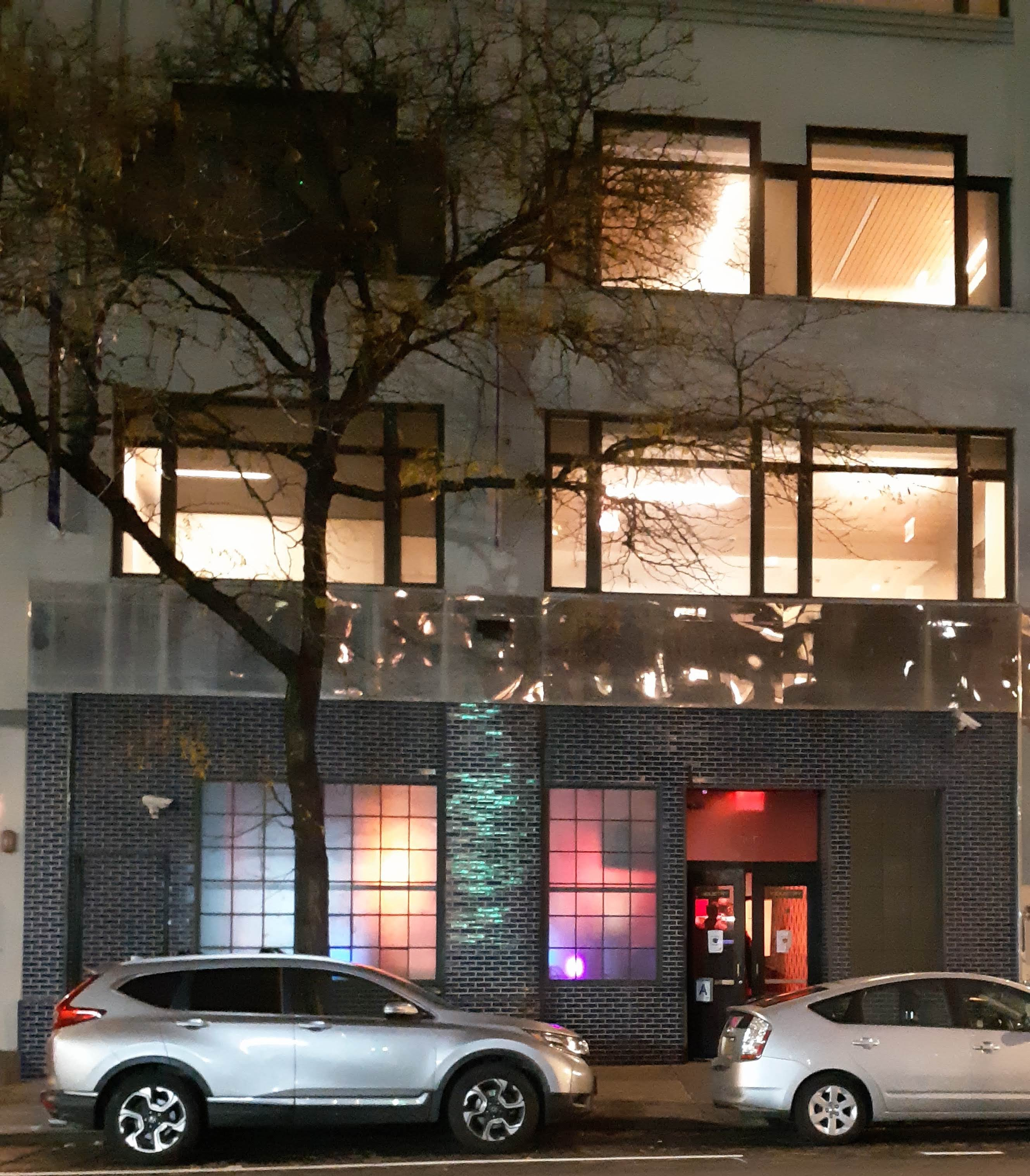
- The bar's entrance, November 2020
- Interactive map of Industry
- Address: 355 West 52nd Street
- Location: Hell's Kitchen, Manhattan, New York City
- Coordinates: 40.7645°N 73.9869°W
- Owner: Bob Pontarelli
- Type: Gay bar; nightclub
- Public transit: 50th Street station (C and E trains); 50th Street station (1 train); Seventh Avenue station

Construction
- Opened: December 2010

Website
- industry-bar.com

Industry Bar, or simply Industry, is a gay bar and nightclub in the Hell's Kitchen neighborhood of Manhattan in New York City. Owned by Bob Pontarelli, it is a sister establishment to Barracuda, a defunct gay bar, and Elmo, a restaurant. Industry opened in 2010 and caters primarily to a crowd of young gay men and tourists. Its musical selection is mostly pop, and its live entertainment consists of a number of weekly drag shows, many of which are hosted by internationally recognized drag queens. New York City nightlife journalists frequently note Industry as one of the top gay venues in Manhattan.

== Description ==
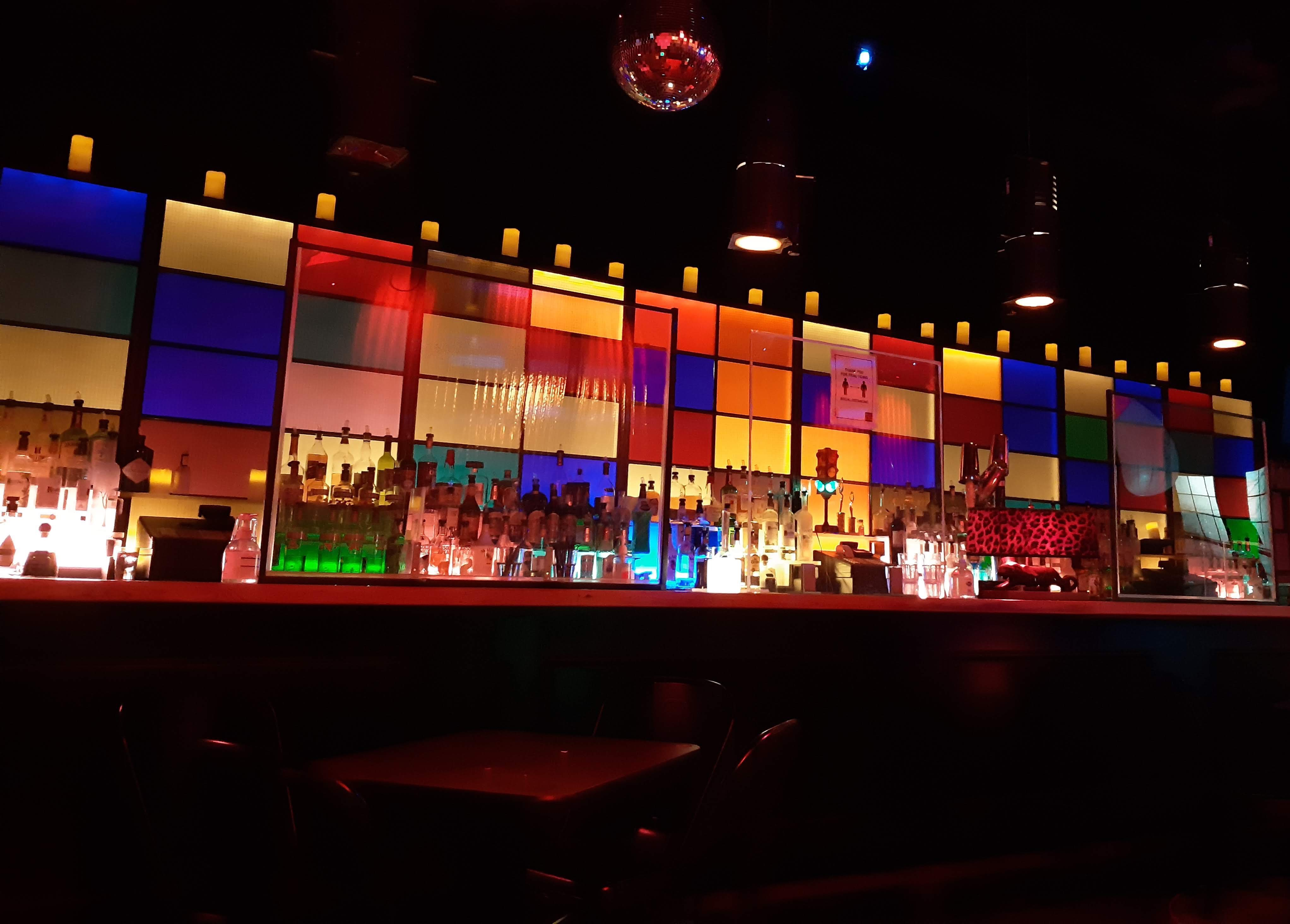
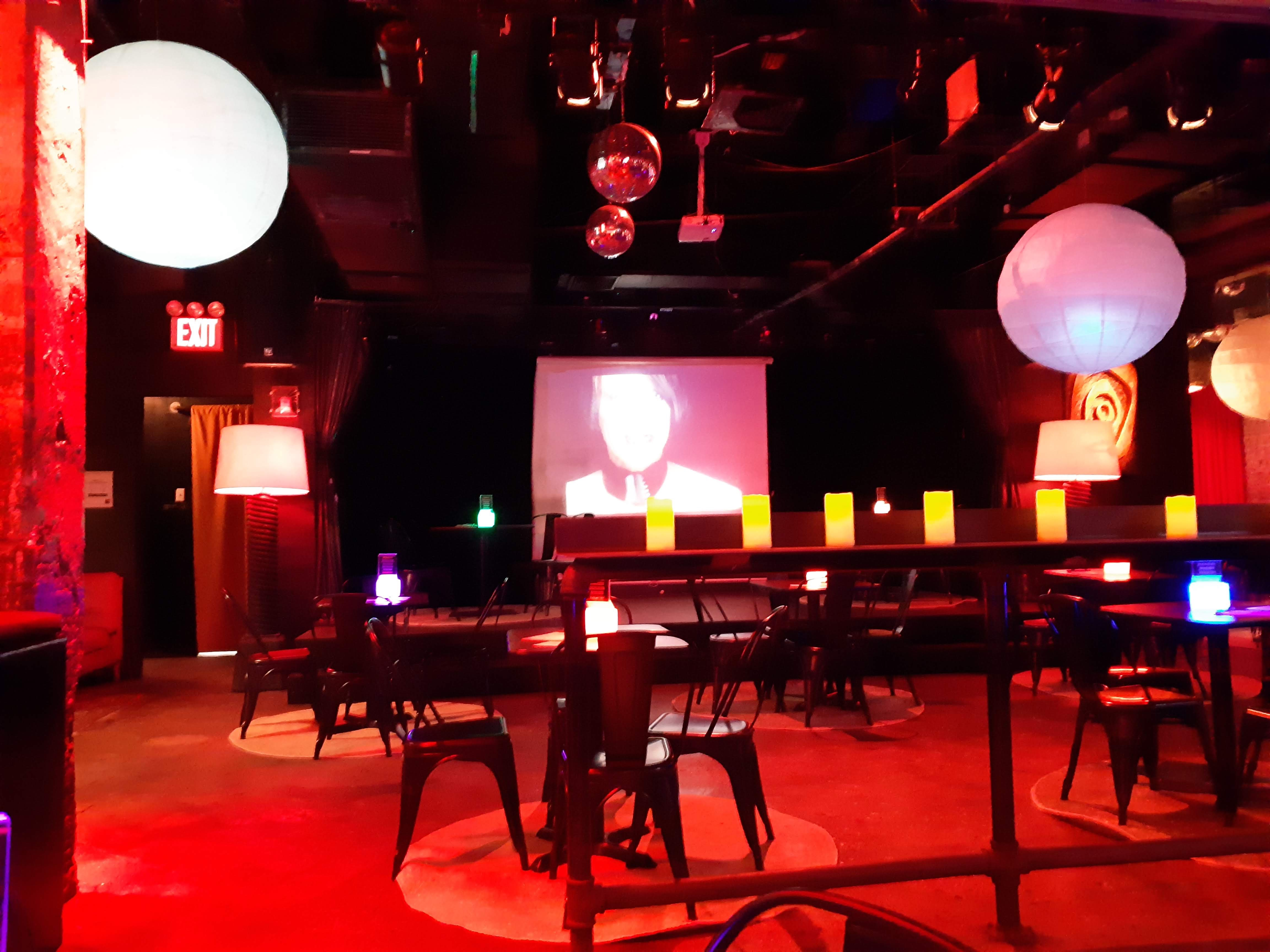
The bar area (top) and seating area (bottom) in 2020. Plexiglass at the bar and tables on the dance floor were introduced due to the COVID-19 pandemic.

Industry occupies the ground-floor space of a Bauhaus-style office building on West 52nd Street in Hell's Kitchen. It was situated directly across the street from Therapy, a gay bar that closed in 2020. Industry's design is based loosely on that of Berghain, a famous nightclub in Berlin, and its layout is "a little bit like a fort, with walls all around and pockets that break loose and allow for an easy flow". The venue's interior features theatre lights, leather couches, oriental rugs, a rococo billiards table, "1970s-era black globe lamps", disco balls and a wooden bar. The stage, located in the rear, is used predominantly for drag shows. The club caters primarily to gay men in their 20s to 40s, and it is known to attract a large tourist crowd.

In a 2015 Time Out New York piece, Ethan LaCroix wrote: "Industry is a sprawling, high-ceilinged space, featuring a long concrete bar (manned by hunky, often shirtless bartenders)." New York magazine describes the establishment as "a welcome blend of the three types of gay bars you've come to expect in Manhattan: the tight-shirt lounge, the tank-top megaclub, and the casual-plaid cruising spot". A description on Thrillist reads: "Square footage is [Industry's] biggest asset, with three large areas each equipped to handle a crowd. There's the classic bar room with tables and stools; a sexy, veiled lounge for intimate moments; and a performance area where drag queens and DJs post up daily." The club's listing in The Infatuation states: "If you find yourself asking why ... they have both disco balls and paper lanterns, you're not understanding the true appeal of Industry Bar.... Saturdays are the right night to be here—it's a great, energetic crowd with very high odds of meeting someone new."

Tim Murphy of The New York Times characterized the bar's musical selection as "relentlessly gay-pop", listing Madonna, Beyoncé, Rihanna and Lady Gaga as playlist staples. A piece in New York magazine stated: "Excellent DJs spin genre-spanning pop mash-ups of Erasure and Ke$ha, DJ Earworm mastermixes, and hits from Cher to Kanye to Cher to Robyn to Cher."

== History ==
Business partners Bob Pontarelli and Stephen Heighton began operating New York City nightlife venues in 1991, when they opened the now-defunct Crobar in Manhattan's East Village. Their second establishment, a now-defunct gay dive bar called Barracuda, opened in Chelsea in 1995. After establishing Elmo, a restaurant, the pair opened Industry in December 2010, in a 4,000-square-foot space previously used as a parking garage. Heighton died the following year.

In Industry's early days, Peppermint and Dallas DuBois hosted a weekly themed drag show called "Queen" there. "Queen" is still running, and as of 2018, its rotating cast of drag queens included Chelsea Piers and Pattaya Hart. As of the same year, Industry's other weekly drag shows were hosted by performers including Sherry Vine, Tina Burner, Kizha Carr, Monét X Change and Phi Phi O'Hara. Bob the Drag Queen had a show at the bar prior to appearing on RuPaul's Drag Race.

Like all New York City nightlife venues, Industry was ordered to cease operation for several months in 2020 due to the COVID-19 pandemic. In July 2020, Pontarelli stated to journalist Michael Musto that "Industry has a difficult landlord.... [But] we have no intention of closing." Since reopening at full indoor capacity in May 2021, the club has required proof of vaccination against COVID-19 for entry.

== Reception ==
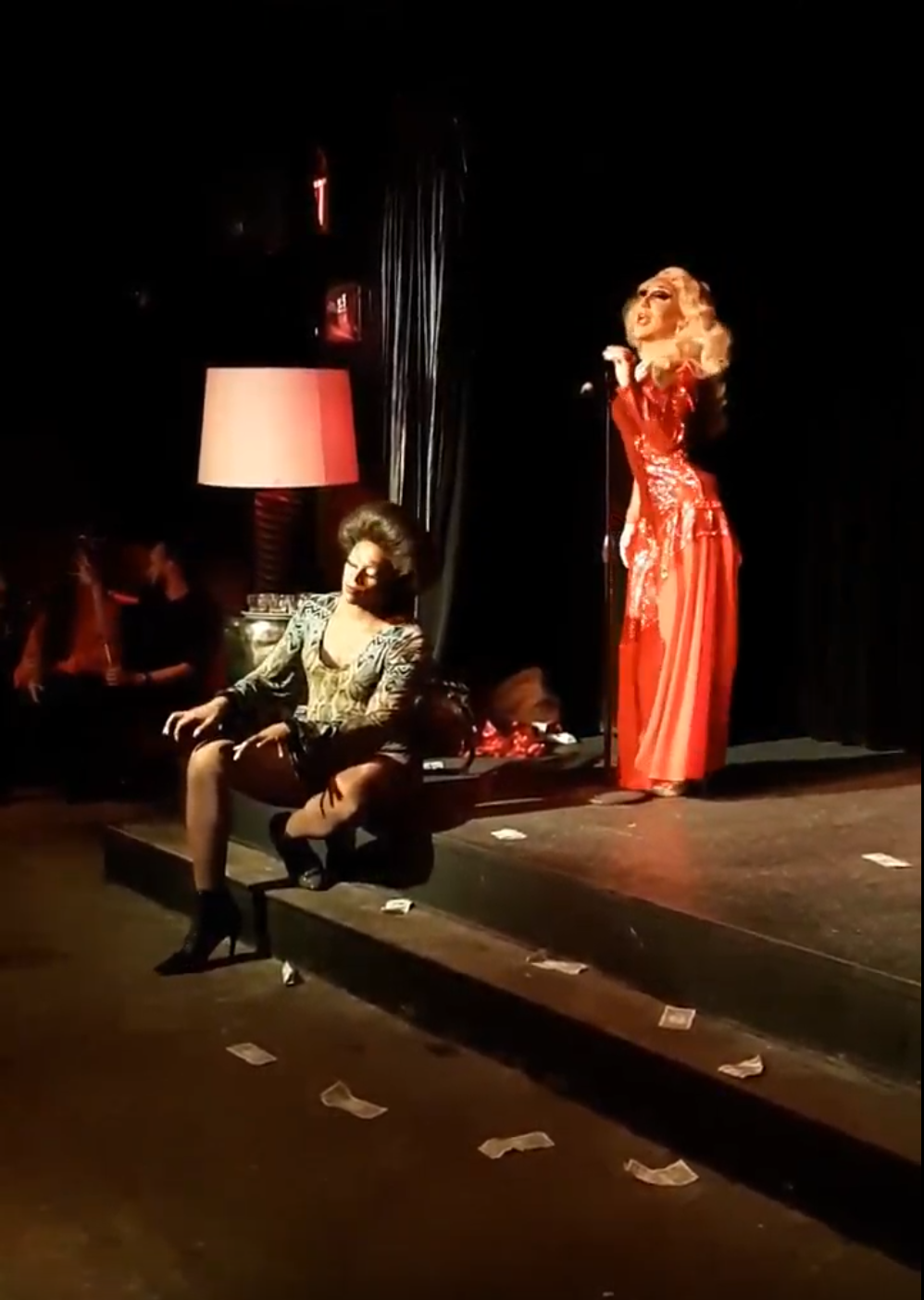
The stage area at Industry during a drag show in 2019

New York magazine rates Industry 68 out of 100, indicating "not terrible". The club ranked 17th on Time Out New York's 2022 list of "the 24 best gay bars in NYC". Vice News staff included Industry on a 2016 compilation of New York City's "hottest gay nightlife spots", and Jeffrey James Keyes of Metrosource labeled it one of the city's top 50 gay bars in 2018. In his 2015 selection of "the best gay bars in Hell's Kitchen", Ethan LaCroix of Time Out New York described Industry as a "sultry midtown drinkery". ShermansTravel places Industry among "the best gay and queer bars in Manhattan", calling it "industrial-chic" and identifying it as the most spacious gay bar in Hell's Kitchen. In 2023, Thrillist's Kyler Alvord put Industry on his list of "the best bars and hotspots for a queer night out in NYC", writing: "If you see wild club scenes in movies and think, 'that doesn’t exist IRL,' you clearly haven't been to Industry."

GayCities.com calls Industry "a true Hell's Kitchen nightlife landmark", while The Guardian notes it as "one of the most popular and successful bars in the area". In 2014, Michael Musto, writing for Paper, ranked the venue second on his list of "the 30 best gay bars in Manhattan". He remarked: "You can't be gay without going to Hell's Kitchen bars, and this one is the shiniest and most happening, with drag shows and more drag shows!" In a NewNowNext piece, Musto referred to Industry as "the reigning home for the city's most established drag entertainment". Miz Cracker, who appeared on season 11 of Drag Race, said: "Everyone who's anyone goes to see 'Queen' on Thursdays at this giant lounge. The wildest queens in the, well, industry perform numbers on a theme for some of the poshest gays in Hell's Kitchen, and everyone has a blast."

== See also ==
- LGBT culture in New York City
- List of nightclubs in New York City
