= Barracuda Lounge =

Gay bar in Manhattan, New York, U.S.

Barracuda
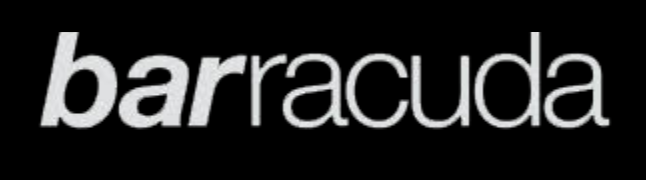
- Logo

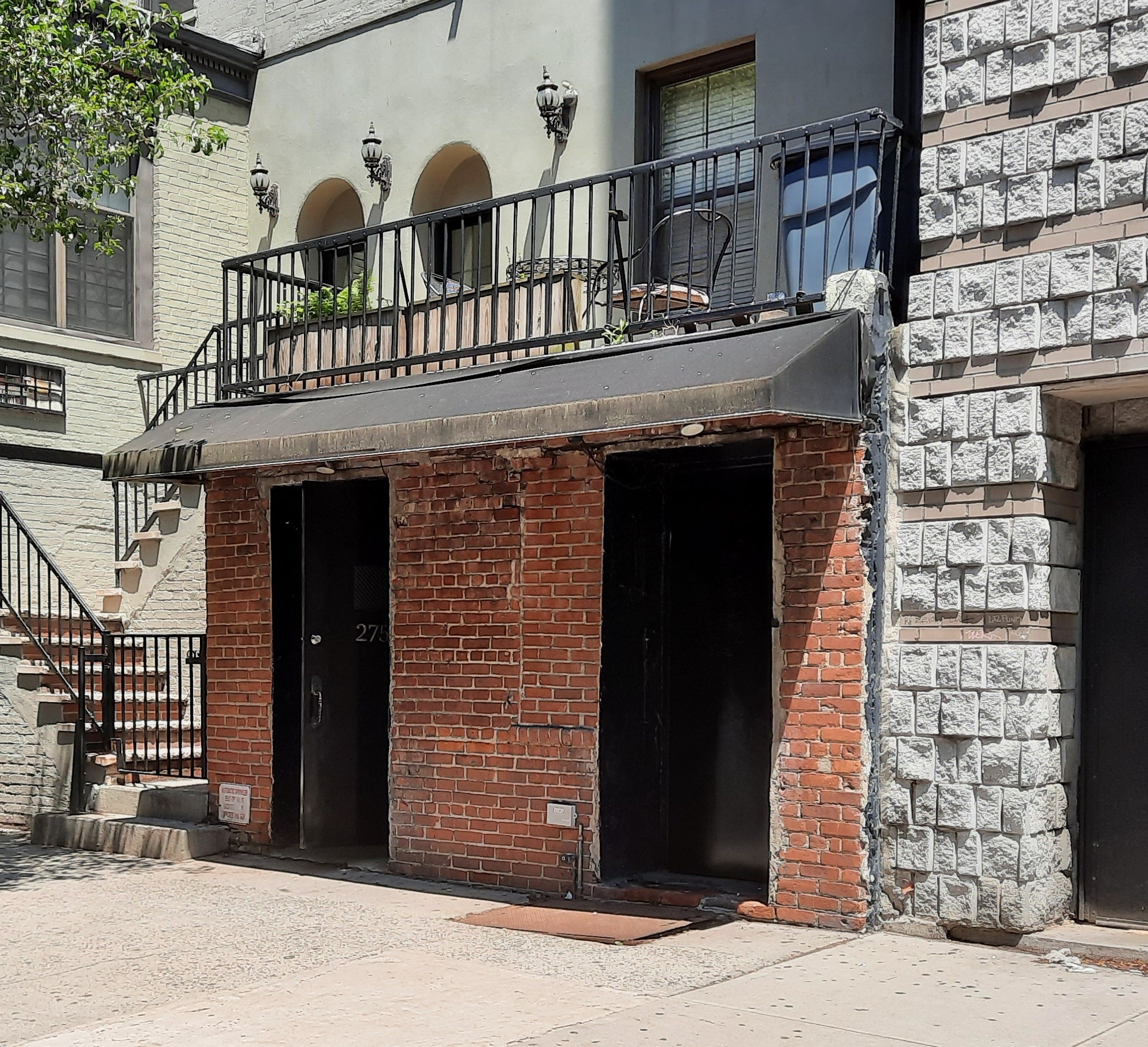
- The bar's entrance in June 2021
- Interactive map of Barracuda
- Address: 275 West 22nd Street
- Location: Chelsea, Manhattan, New York, US
- Coordinates: 40.7446°N 73.9983°W
- Owner: Bob Pontarelli
- Type: Gay bar
- Public transit: 23rd Street station (C and E trains); 23rd Street station (1 train); 23rd Street station (PATH train)

Construction
- Opened: October 1995
- Closed: March 23, 2025

Barracuda Lounge, or simply Barracuda, was a gay bar in the Chelsea neighborhood of Manhattan in New York City. Opened in 1995, the bar was known for its nightly drag shows. It was a sister establishment to Industry, a nightclub, and Elmo, a restaurant. Barracuda was home to "Star Search", the longest-running bar show in New York City, which began in the early 1990s and may have served as an inspiration for RuPaul's Drag Race. In the 1990s and 2000s, Barracuda was a popular celebrity hangout, and it was frequently the site of promotional events for new music and Broadway plays. The bar shuttered on March 23, 2025, due to damage from a demolition project in surrounding buildings. Critics generally praised Barracuda for its intimate, relaxed and entertainment-focused atmosphere, which was unusual at the time of its creation, and some credited this with revolutionizing the concept of gay bars.

== History ==
=== Drag ===
Barracuda opened in Chelsea in October 1995. Its owner, Bob Pontarelli, founded the bar with his business partner, Stephen Heighton, who died in 2011. The pair were fans of drag and wanted to showcase that art form at the new establishment. In an interview with The Advocate, several of Barracuda's earliest performers said that it was "the first performance- and drag-based bar in Chelsea" and one of the first venues in New York to offer one-woman shows to drag queens. It was also among the first to feature a drag show every night.

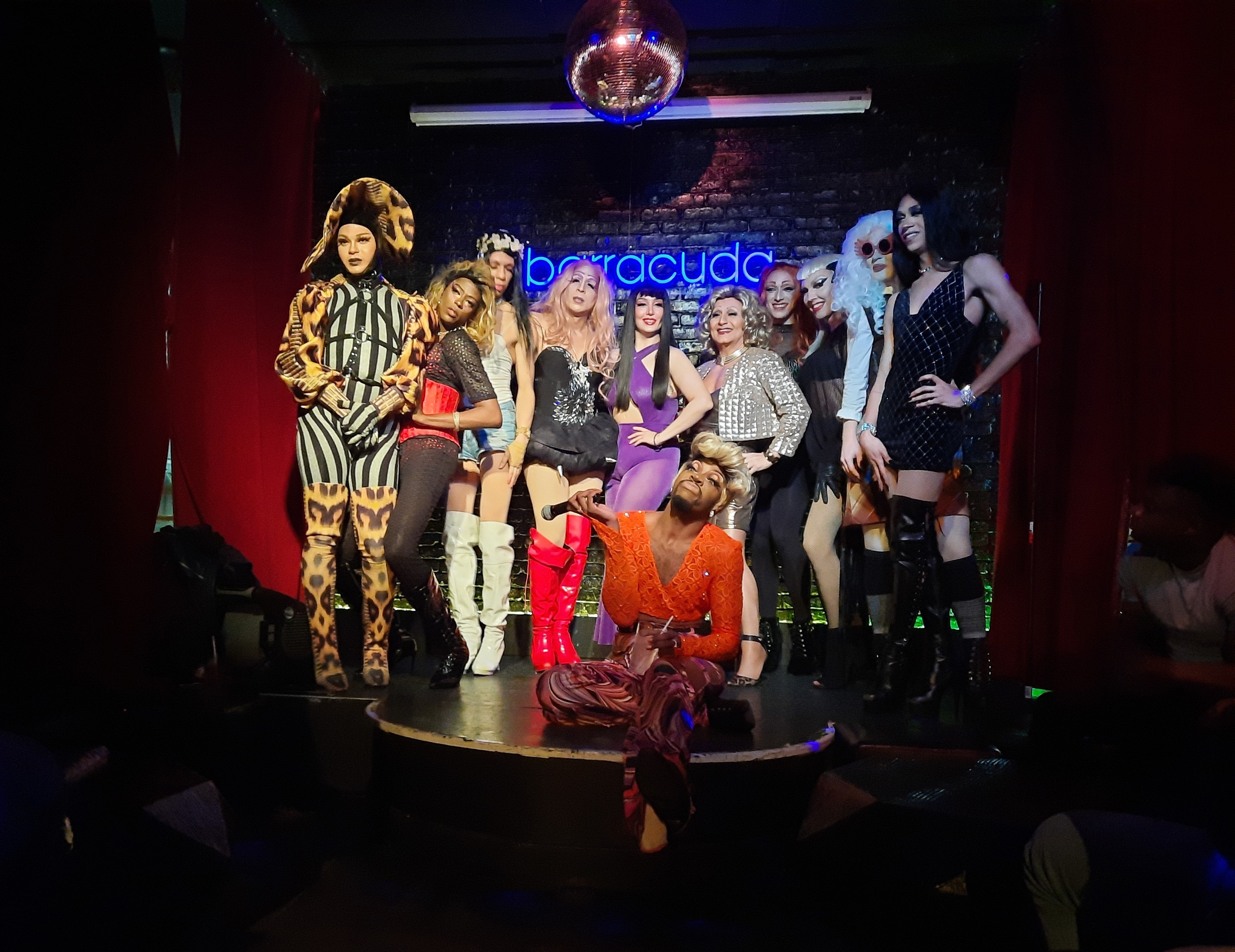
Host (seated) and contestants of "Star Search" in March 2022

Pontarelli and Heighton had previously co-owned Crobar, a venue in Manhattan's East Village, where a weekly drag show called "Star Search" began in 1991. They subsequently moved the show to Barracuda. Nashom Wooden, who performed in drag as Mona Foot, hosted "Star Search" in the 1990s, and Mimi Imfurst hosted it in 2011. Sherry Vine, Candis Cayne and Hedda Lettuce began their drag careers in the show, which, according to The New York Times, "preceded RuPaul's Drag Race by more than 15 years and probably served as one of its inspirations". It is billed as the longest-running drag show in New York City. Wooden (as Mona Foot) also hosted the first annual edition of the Glam Awards at Barracuda in 1997. The event, a ceremony à la the Oscars for the queer nightlife community of New York, is now typically held at larger venues.

Jackie Beat, Peppermint and Miz Cracker also started drag at Barracuda. Vine, who worked at the bar for 20 years, had her own show there until the early 2010s, when she moved her performances to Industry, Pontarelli's nightclub in Hell's Kitchen. Cayne was at Barracuda for 10 years. Prior to winning season 8 of RuPaul's Drag Race, Bob the Drag Queen was also a fixture at the bar. In the 2010s, Tina Burner, who went on to appear on the thirteenth season of Drag Race, hosted "Star Search" on Thursday nights. As of June 2023, the competition's host was Kizha Carr.

=== Celebrity hangout ===
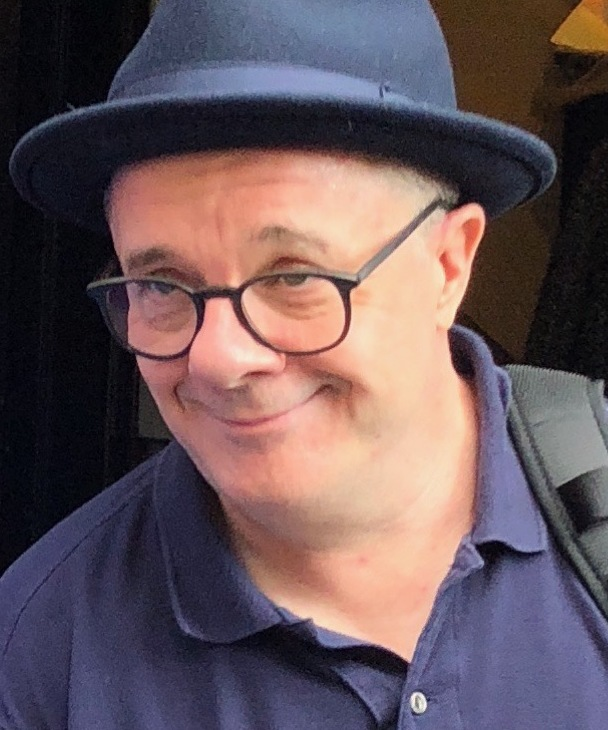
Once weekly patron Nathan Lane

Through the early 2000s, Barracuda was a popular destination for high-profile names and promoters in the entertainment industry. A 2001 New York Times article said: "[T]his neighborhood gay bar keeps drawing celebrities, who often appear free, along with record executives, Broadway show promoters and perfume designers in search of the elusive holy grail of cool." Pontarelli and Heighton also hired A-list talent to perform on their stage. Guests included Eartha Kitt, Mackenzie Phillips, Rue McClanahan, Charo, Jennifer Coolidge, Johnny Knoxville, Tonya Harding and many Broadway stars. Peter Galvin of Atlantic Records stated that music industry executives saw Barracuda as a strategic place to promote new music, and his company "organized more than 25 events at the club, like an appearance of Duncan Sheik". Similarly, Broadway promoters took advantage of Barracuda's atmosphere and reputation as a "cool and hip place" to generate publicity for plays; they frequently arranged for cast members of their shows to appear at the bar.

A 1999 episode of Sex and the City contained a scene filmed at the bar.

Actor Nathan Lane used to visit Barracuda weekly. Graham Norton, who dated Tina Burner, stated that the venue was where the two met. While attending Vine's show one night, Betty Buckley delivered an impromptu a cappella performance of the song "Memory" from the musical Cats, which was then in its first run on Broadway. Additionally, "[t]here was [a] fabled lounge appearance of Australia's Queen of Yodeling, Mary Schneider, who presided over the club until 4 a.m. after singing a powerful version of 'The William Tell Overture.' The former television evangelist Tammy Faye Bakker Messner came calling ... to promote a documentary about her life."

Pontarelli embraced the spontaneity that such events injected into the atmosphere at Barracuda, and he tried to further cultivate "the mood of the unexpected" by changing the bar's decor and visual themes up to twice per year.

=== COVID-19 pandemic ===
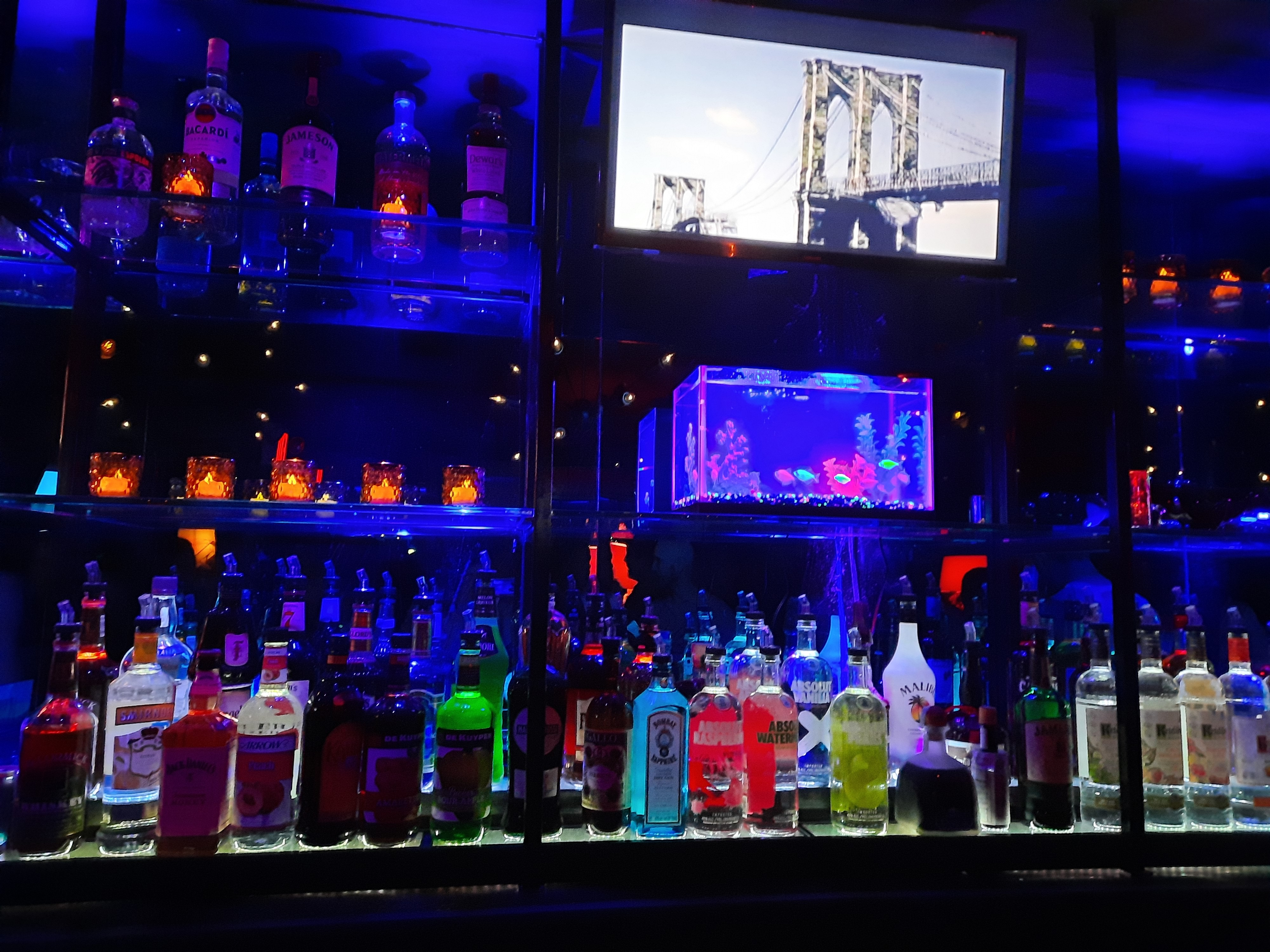
Behind the bar, 2021

Like other New York City nightlife venues, Barracuda was ordered to shutter temporarily in early 2020 due to the COVID-19 pandemic. When asked in July of that year whether any of his establishments would remain closed for good, Pontarelli replied: "It really comes down to the rent for everybody and the relationship you have with the landlord.... Barracuda will open the second we can." In May 2021, Michael Musto reported that Barracuda—still closed—was undergoing a major renovation ahead of its anticipated reopening. The project included the installation of a new bar, stage, lounge furniture and HVAC system. Of these changes, Pontarelli said: "Make no mistake; it'll still be Barracuda, not a fancy bar,... but it was time. It'll reopen when you can really ... be flush against each other without masks."

On June 9, 2021, Barracuda's management announced via social media that it would reopen in two days, on June 11. The bar held a celebration for its 25th anniversary on September 26. In addition to drag performances, the event contained a memorial segment for Mona Foot, who died of a suspected case of COVID-19 in March 2020, and for another drag queen, Sweetie, who died of cancer in 2017.

=== Closure ===
On March 17, 2025, Pontarelli announced that Barracuda would permanently close on March 23, 2025. He cited damages sustained from an ongoing demolition project in surrounding buildings, stating: "There is no way to anticipate the additional damage and risks that could arise in the future. It is impossible to conduct business as usual."

== Reception ==
When Barracuda ... first opened its doors in 1995, it was already something unique. At a time when gay bars depended more on cruising and drinking, the Chelsea establishment focused on creating a lounge bar featuring drag shows and regularly scheduled guest appearances—a concept that did not widely exist and has since been adopted by untold numbers of bars.

— Michael Shirey, Gay City News

Barracuda was named Best Bar by New York magazine, HX and New York Press. It ranked second on Time Out's 2022 list of "the 24 best gay bars in NYC". In 2014, Musto placed the venue sixth on his list of "the 30 Best Gay Bars in Manhattan". Jeffrey James Keyes of Metrosource included Barracuda in his 2018 compilation of New York City's top 50 gay bars. In 2023, Thrillist's Kyler Alvord selected Barracuda for his list of "the best bars and hotspots for a queer night out in NYC", writing: "The windowless bunker bar shuts out the world around it to fully immerse visitors in everything it has to offer—and it offers quite a bit, particularly in terms of drag."

Time Out called the establishment "[a] classic, no-attitude gay lounge in Chelsea [that] has outlasted many others due to its combination of cozy couches, awesome drag shows, generous happy hours and friendly bartenders". A Travel Gay review described the bar as "much-loved", adding: "The place is small, but that's part of its charm." Referencing Barracuda's popularity, Michael Cook of Instinct said: "If you open up must-read NYC columns like Page Six or New York magazine's Daily Intelligencer column, you frequently will read a dishy piece about what happened the night before at Barracuda." ShermansTravel listed Barracuda among "the best gay and queer bars in Manhattan", calling it "a Chelsea mainstay" and noting it for its generous happy hour pours and "top-notch" drag shows.

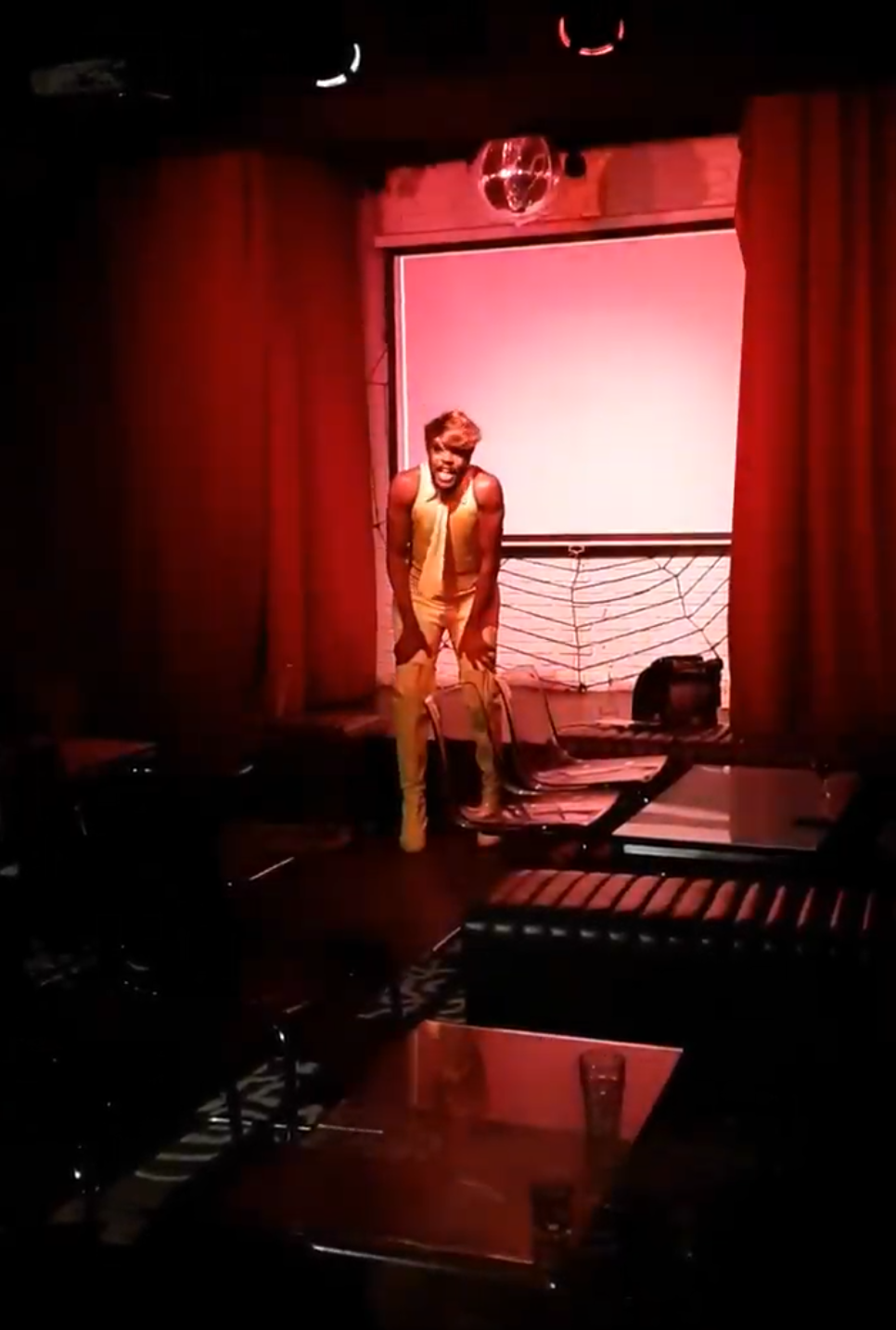
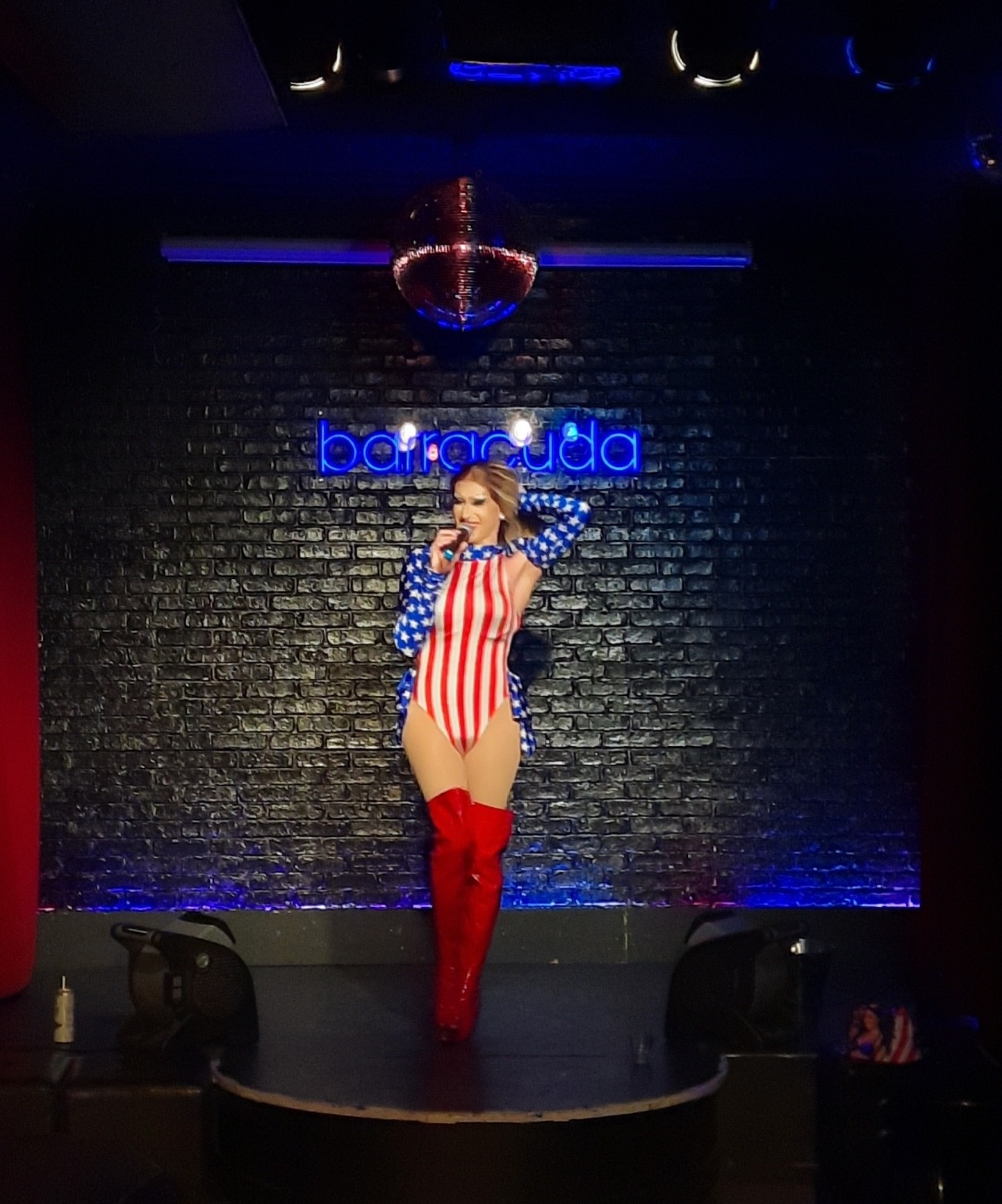
Stage area at Barracuda during a drag show in 2019 (left) and in 2022 (right)

An EDGE Media Network announcement for the establishment's 20th anniversary in 2015 characterized it as "a bar of 'firsts'", remarking:

Prior to Barracuda, gay bars were, for the most part, [a] somewhat serious affair meant for cruising and drinking. The bar shattered that mold by introducing avant-grade couch-style seating and lounging, innovative and sweeping nightly entertainment and an ever-present irony in its brand.... With its downtown, edgy sensibility and humor, Barracuda proved unique to the burgeoning neighborhood and helped launch Chelsea as an internationally recognized gay-borhood. Barracuda remains an iconic city destination today and has become the most honored bar in New York City.

Miz Cracker said in a 2019 interview that Barracuda was the first gay bar she ever entered and that it was still her favorite. She further said: "[I]n recent years Barracuda has been overshadowed by glitzier hot spots in Hell's Kitchen, including businesses run by the same owner, like Industry Bar. But she's still the only gay bar where I can kick up my feet and genuinely relax for a laugh in the dark with people of all kinds."

In December 2021, Eater Portland reported that the interior of Sissy Bar, a venue slated to open in 2022 in Portland, Oregon, will be designed in homage to Barracuda, which it described as "a classic New York drag bar with low lounge lighting and a lengthy bar". Specifically, "Sissy Bar will have a similarly designed backbar and a long banquette, with a yet-to-be-revealed 'Instagram wall'." Its owner said: "It's meant to be dark and cozy, with the right kind of lighting you want to sit in for a while."

== See also ==
- Impact of the COVID-19 pandemic on the LGBTQ community
- LGBTQ culture in New York City
- LGBTQ history in New York
