= The World (nightclub) =

Defunct East Village, Manhattan nightclub between the early 1980s and 1991

Coordinates: 40°43′17″N 73°58′53″W

- Industry: Entertainment
- Headquarters: New York City, United States

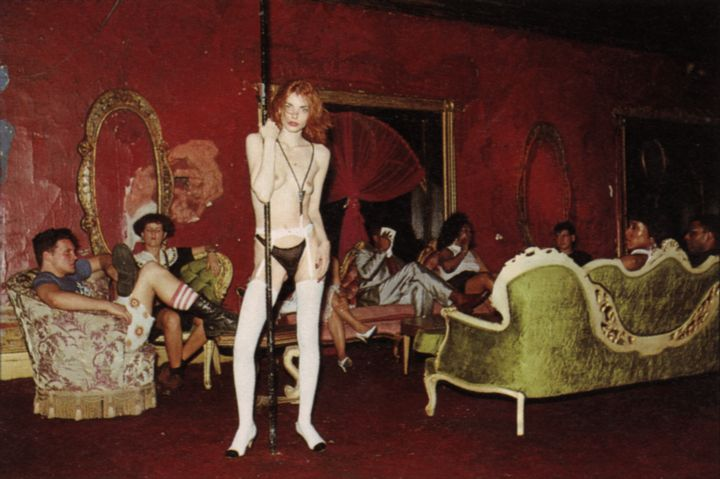
Interior of The World, a nude Zoë Lund on the pole

The World was a nightclub, located at 254 East 2nd Street in the East Village neighborhood of the Manhattan borough of New York City, United States.

The venue, which operated from the early 1980s until 1991, was housed in a former catering hall and theater. It included a secondary establishment called "The It Club".

== History and operations ==
The World attracted a clientele that was economically, racially, and sexually diverse, and included artists, celebrities, and fashion designers, including Keith Haring, Afrika Bambaataa, Madonna, Brooke Shields, Prince, Stephen Sprouse, RuPaul, and Carolina Herrera, together with banjee boys and members of voguing houses.

An early incubator of New York's house music and club-kid scenes, The World helped launch the careers of several prominent nightlife figures, including Michael Alig, DJ Larry Tee, DJ David Morales, DJ Frankie Knuckles, DJ Kip Lavinger, DJ Zoe B, the Lady Bunny, and Dean Johnson, whose Tuesday night "Rock and Roll Fag Bar" party gave rise to New York's gay rock-and-roll scene. Several big-name music acts also made cameo appearances at The World, including David Bowie, the Beastie Boys, Debbie Harry, The Ramones, Echo & the Bunnymen, Madness, Big Audio Dynamite, Sinéad O'Connor, Public Enemy, Neil Young, The Sugarcubes, Salt-N-Pepa, and Pink Floyd. The World was also used as one of the filming locations for Devo's 1988 music video for the song "Disco Dancer".

The World operated largely outside the law, and opened and closed unpredictably. It ceased operations permanently on June 27, 1991, when co-owner Steven Venizelos was found dead in the balcony. He had been shot three times at close range. The murder was never solved. The building that housed The World was subsequently demolished and replaced with an apartment building.

== See also ==
- List of nightclubs in New York City
