= Dean Johnson (entertainer) =

American musician, promoter, actor

- Born: 1961; United States
- Died: 2007 (aged 45–46); Washington, D.C., U.S.
- Occupation: Entertainer

Dean Johnson (1961–2007) was an American entertainer. His father was a preacher in Massachusetts. Johnson moved to study film at NYU, lived in the dorm and frequented Ninth Circle bar, aged 19. A cross-dressing musician, party promoter, and prominent figure in the nightlife scene of New York City in the 1980s, 1990s, and 2000s, he was known for his towering height, shaved head, giant sunglasses, and penchant for wearing short cocktail dresses that exaggerated the length of his pale, lithe figure. Johnson played a seminal role in the emergence of the Queercore gay rock-and-roll subculture in the East Village.

== Music career ==
Both an underground rock star and a porn star, Dean Johnson fronted two bands: Dean and the Weenies and the Velvet Mafia. He partied with art-world luminaries like Keith Haring, Jean-Michel Basquiat, and Andy Warhol, and performed at nightclubs such as Area, Danceteria, The Cat Club, and the Pyramid. Johnson was the driving force behind the ground-breaking Rock and Roll Fag Bar party, held Tuesday nights in the late 1980s at The World. He subsequently produced the monthly HomoCorps live music showcase at CBGB, which featured gay and transgender rock-and-roll bands.

== Death ==
Johnson grappled with drug addiction and was a sex worker. He died at age 46 from an apparent drug overdose while working in a Washington, D.C. apartment. There is some suspicion around his death, stemming from the fact that another man had died with the same John two days prior.
