= Riobamba (nightclub) =

Nightclub in New York City, 1942 to 1944

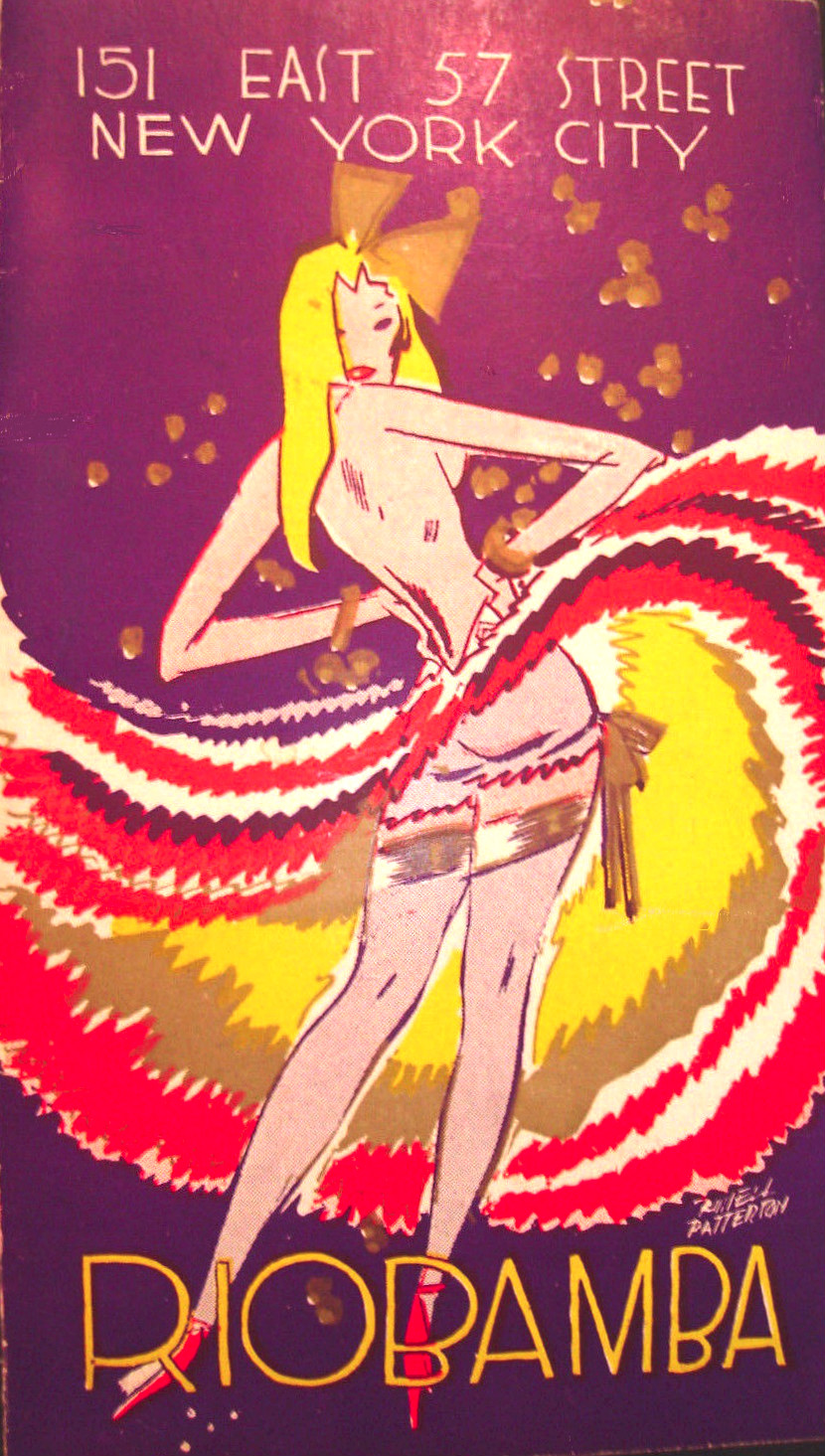
- Address: East 57th Street; New York City; United States
- Owner: Louis "Lepke" Buchalter
- Capacity: 400
- Type: Nightclub

Construction
- Opened: 1942
- Closed: 1944

Riobamba was a New York City nightclub. Operating from 1942 to 1944, it was closely associated with singer Frank Sinatra, who made his solo nightclub debut there in 1943.

== Location ==
The club was located on East 57th Street near Third Avenue in Manhattan.

== History ==
The Riobamba was owned by American Mafia boss Louis "Lepke" Buchalter. While Buchalter was awaiting execution on death row, his wife ran the club. From 1942 to 1944 the club was managed by Linton D. Weil and Arthur Jawitz. There was a claim that the Duke of York owned the real estate where the club was located.

Patterned after the larger Copacabana, the Riobamba was a "glitzy jewel box of a joint" with a small dance floor on which stood a baby grand piano. There was no stage; the performers stood near the tables at which patrons sat. The room seated 400.

Shows typically featured a stand-up comedian, a dance troupe, and an orchestra in addition to the main act. At the beginning of the set, a line of chorus girls came out singing a song called "Riobamba", which had been written by Leonard Bernstein and which the club had purchased for $50; Bernstein recycled the musical trope in his 1944 ballet "Fancy Free". Floor shows were held at 8:30 pm, 12 am, and 2 am, while dance troupes and relief bands performed at other times.

== Acts ==
Among the acts that performed at the Riobamba were singer Jane Froman, vaudeville performer Grace Hayes, singer-actress Hannah Williams, and the Chandra-Kaly Dancers. Dean Martin appeared as a last-minute substitute for Frank Sinatra in September 1943.

== Frank Sinatra debut ==
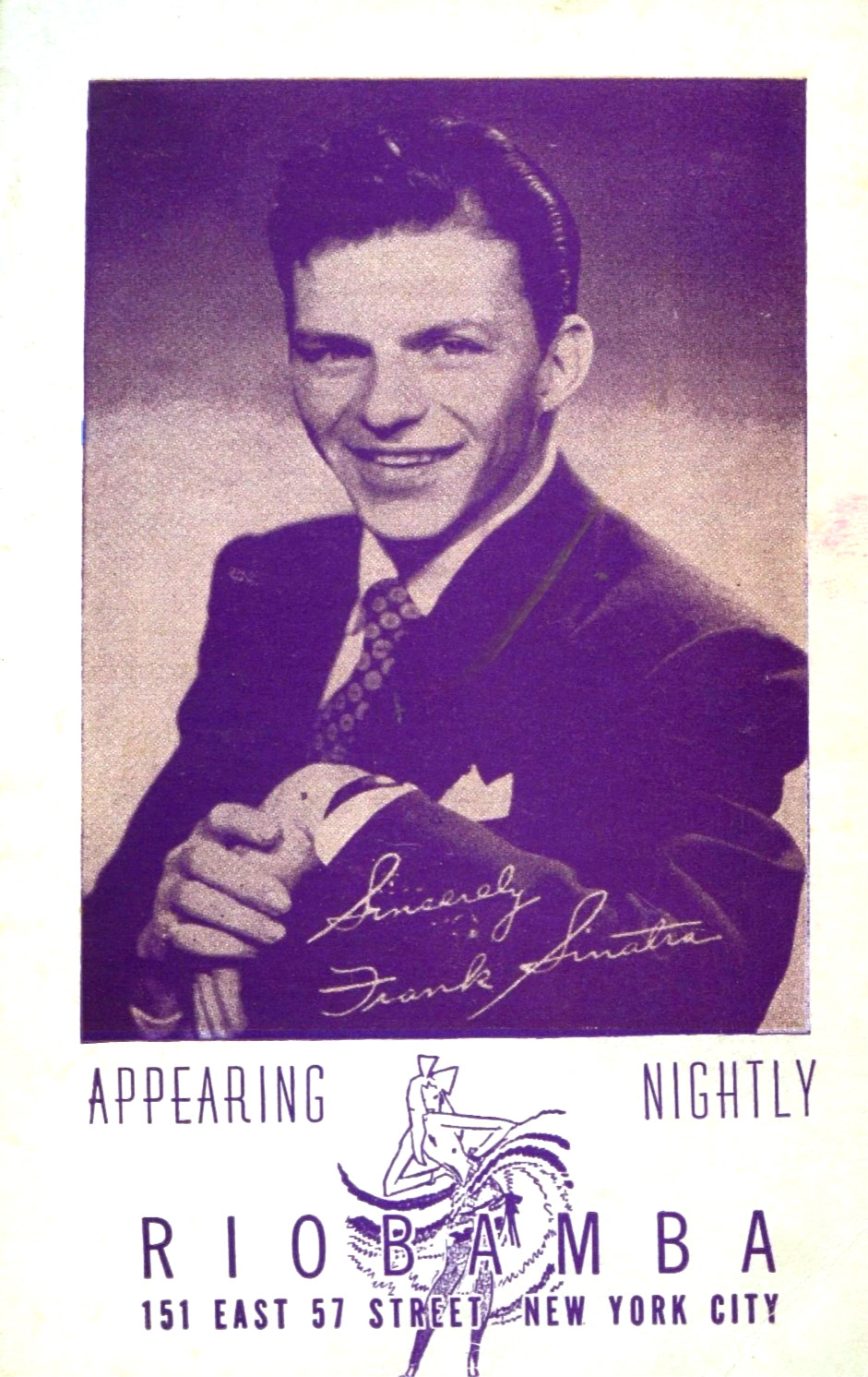
Frank Sinatra Riobamba postcard, 1943

Three times an evening, Sinatra ... steps into the baby spotlight that splashes on to the dance floor. In a come-hither, breathless voice, he then sings such songs as 'You'd Be So Nice to Come Home To', 'That Old Black Magic', 'She's Funny That Way', and 'Embraceable You'. As he whispers the lyrics, he fondles his wedding ring and his eyes grow misty. A hush hangs over the tables, and in the eyes of the women present there is soft contentment. The lights go up and Sinatra bows, slouches across the floor and is swallowed up by the shadows.

— George Frazier, Life magazine, May 3, 1943

In 1943 Frank Sinatra's managers tried, unsuccessfully, to book him into the Copacabana, which was then "the hottest of the hot" of Manhattan's nightclubs. They settled for a three-week engagement at the Riobamba, which was experiencing serious financial trouble. Sinatra was offered $750 a week. The singer did not receive top billing; he was advertised as an "extra added attraction" under monologist Walter O'Keefe, singer-comedian Sheila Barrett, a dance troupe, and a choir. Though Sinatra was unnerved by the small size of the performance area and was gripped with stage fright, he leaned against the piano and began singing. According to columnist Earl Wilson, who was present, "Frank was in a dinner jacket and he was wearing a wedding band. He had a small curl that fell almost over his right eye. With trembling lips – I don't know how he made them tremble, but I saw it – he sang 'She's Funny That Way' and 'Night and Day' and succeeded in bringing down the house".

Before the week was out, Sinatra was attracting standing-room-only audiences even for his 2:30 am show, and Barrett had been demoted to second-billing under Sinatra and had quit. When O'Keefe announced that he was quitting, too, he told his last audience, "When I came to this place, I was the star and a kid named Sinatra, one of the acts. Then suddenly a steamroller came along and knocked me flat. Ladies and gentlemen, I give you the rightful star – Frank Sinatra". The club increased Sinatra's pay to $1,000 and then $1,500, and he performed for a total of ten weeks, becoming "one of the biggest draws in any New York club". The gig served to prove Sinatra's appeal to more mature audiences than his "bobby soxer" fan base, while autograph seekers thronged outside on the sidewalk.

In the wake of Sinatra's success, other clubs rushed to hire "crooners". La Martinique hired Argentine vocalist Dick Haymes, jumpstarting his career. In August 1943 the Riobamba ranked in the top three clubs in New York in Billboard's fifth annual poll; the others were the Stork Club and the Latin Quarter.

== Closure ==
In spring 1944 the Riobamba was shut down by the Federal government for nonpayment of taxes, including the amusement tax, alcohol tax, withholding tax, and Social Security tax, amounting to a back claim of $24,000. The club was also reportedly delinquent in paying musicians and performers, as well as on its mortgage.

In September 1944 it was announced that the club would reopen under the lease of Harold Jacobs and Julius Yablok; in December 1944, Café Society nightclub owner Barney Josephson was said to be interested in assuming the lease. In March 1945, theatrical producer George H. Kondolf and a group of other interested parties purchased the Riobamba, but the club was not immediately opened due to a curfew issue. By 1946, the Riobamba had been replaced by the Embassy Club.

The year after Louis Buchalter was executed, his widow Betty married the former manager of the club, Arthur Jarwood, also known as Arthur Jawitz.
