= Chateau Moderne =

Manhattan night club popular in the 1930s

Coordinates: 40.757572°N 73.974987°W

Chateau Moderne was a Manhattan night club which was popular in the 1930s. It was located in a no longer extant building at 42 East 50th Street, between Fifth and Madison Avenues. The establishment entered a not guilty plea to income tax evasion in Manhattan United States Federal Court on July 19, 1939.

In 1935 Chateau Moderne was renovated with the bar being moved forward to provide room for a sensational stage show. It reopened on September 14, 1935. Singer Nora Lee King, a Decca Records recording artist, entertained at the night club in November 1941. Matchbook

== See also ==
- List of nightclubs in New York City
