= Hollywood (Madonna song) =

2003 single by Madonna

Single by Madonna

from the album American Life
- Released: May 27, 2003
- Recorded: 2002
- Studio: Olympic Recording (Barnes, London)
- Genre: Folk rock; synth-pop; electro-folk; electropop; psychedelic folk
- Length: 4:24 (album version); 3:42 (edit)
- Label: Maverick; Warner Bros
- Songwriters: Madonna; Mirwais Ahmadzaï
- Producers: Madonna; Mirwais Ahmadzaï

Madonna singles chronology
"American Life" (2003)	"Hollywood" (2003)	"Me Against the Music" (2003)

Music video
- "Hollywood" on YouTube

"Hollywood" is a song recorded by American singer Madonna. The song was written and produced by Madonna and Mirwais Ahmadzaï for her ninth studio album, American Life (2003). On May 27, 2003, it was released as the second single from the album by Maverick Records. It later appeared on the greatest hits album, Celebration (2009). "Hollywood" is a folk rock, synth-pop, electro-folk, electropop and psychedelic folk song that lyrically discusses American culture and greed, focusing on Hollywood, California, as a place of pop stars and illusory dreams. Ahmadzaï did the main programming for the track and kept the track as simple as possible, without using too many instruments.

Several remixes of "Hollywood", done by DJs such as Jacques Lu Cont, The Micronauts, Paul Oakenfold, Deepsky and Victor Calderone, were included on physical releases of the single around the world. Music critics applauded the song's catchiness but criticized its lyrics. The song topped Billboard's Hot Dance Club Songs and Hot Dance Singles Sales component charts. The debut of the "Hollywood" remixes on the Dance Singles Sales chart gave Madonna her longest stretch of chart-topping titles on this chart, "Hollywood" being her sixth in a row. It also reached the top ten in Canada, Finland, Italy, Romania and number two in the United Kingdom and Spain on the commercial charts.

An accompanying music video, directed by Jean-Baptiste Mondino, portrays Madonna highlighting the highs and lows of Hollywood. After the video was released, French photographer Guy Bourdin's son filed a federal lawsuit that accused Madonna of ripping off the work of his father, showing sequences of the video to be similar to his father's photographs taken in the 1980s. "Hollywood" was first performed in an acoustic version along with "American Life" and "Mother and Father" on a promotional tour for the album. In August 2003, Madonna opened the MTV Video Music Awards performing a medley of "Like a Virgin" and "Hollywood" with Britney Spears, Christina Aguilera and Missy Elliott. During the performance, Madonna kissed Spears and Aguilera on the lips, generating strong reactions from the media. "Hollywood" was later used as a dancers' interlude on the 2004 Re-Invention World Tour.

== Background and writing ==
"This song is like a metaphor for me. It's the city of dreams and superficiality. It's the place where you forget about the really interesting things in life. In Hollywood you can lose your memory and your vision of the future. You can lose everything because you can lose yourself."

— Madonna speaking to Spanish radio station Los 40 Principales about the song.

When Madonna started working on her ninth studio album, the cultural mood of America was bleak and paranoid after the September 11 attacks. There was discontent and fear all around as the terrorism and hatred took people by surprise, as they started questioning the feasibility of the American Dream. While developing the songs for American Life with producer Mirwais Ahmadzaï, Madonna interrogated and pondered upon those values. The confusion, disorientation and the anger they created seeped into the making of each and every song, including "Hollywood". She later spoke about Ahmadzaï's downbeat existentialism and the long discussions they had about this, and society's obsession with fame and fortune. In an interview with Q, in April 2003, she described the song as the allure of the beautiful life in Hollywood. The singer expressed her opinion about fame and celebrity culture, and how people think it to be a "wonderful life" but in reality is a "very powerful illusion".

In the VH1 special Madonna Speaks, the artist further clarified that the theme behind "Hollywood", as well as "American Life" and "I'm So Stupid" from the album, was about her "wanting to shout from the rooftops that we have all been living in a dream. I have been living in a dream — and you're all living in a dream and we have to wake up to reality." Madonna's first single from American Life—the title track—became the lowest charting first single from a Madonna album since her debut, reaching a peak of number 37 on the Billboard Hot 100. Warner Bros. Records hastily wanted to save the album from dropping off the charts, and decided to release "Hollywood", believing the song had commercial potential.

== Recording ==
"Hollywood" was produced by Madonna, along with Ahmadzaï. The recording sessions for American Life started in late 2001, then was put on hold as Madonna filmed Swept Away in Malta and starred in the West End play Up for Grabs. She returned to the Olympic Recording Studios in late 2002 and finished off the sessions. Initially, Madonna was not satisfied with the original version of "Hollywood" recorded, so she developed an alternate melody for it. The instruments used on "Hollywood" are similar to the ones used on the other songs from American Life. The mixing for the track was done by Mark "Spike" Stent at the Westlake Recording Studios at West Hollywood, California, while Tim Young did the mastering of the song at Metropolis Studios in London. Ahmadzaï played the guitars, and also did the necessary programming. He used a drum kit and percussion from an E-mu Emulator and also added extra drum sounds to give the song an old, disco vibe. Wanting to have a loud bass synth sound, Ahmadzaï used a Nord Lead synthesizer with lot of filtering manipulations. But he faced problems with it, so he used a Yamaha O2R mixer. He did not want "Hollywood" to sound like the music being played at the nightclubs, so he recorded Madonna's vocals with heavy compression in her headphones. Two machines were used for the vocal editing in "Hollywood". Madonna preferred the Antares Auto-Tune plug in, while Ahmadzaï chose an AMS pitch shifter]. Madonna wanted Auto-Tune because she wanted "Hollywood" to have a more dance-like feel to it, although Ahmadzaï was against it. Describing the recording of the vocals, Ahmadzaï said:

"We used mainly analog compressors on the vocals, sometimes very cheap or mid-budget stuff, recorded with a Sony G800 tube mic, a Neve 8081 preamp and an LA-2A compressor/limiter. But everything is about the setting ... We experiment a lot with vocal sounds. For example, the pitch-down vocal at the end was initially much longer. The mix of this one was very hard — like almost all tracks — because there was so much stuff going on. This is why maybe the final version is so simple."

== Composition ==
"Hollywood" (2003)
A 22-second sample of the song's chorus, featuring Madonna singing about the lifestyle of Hollywood over a folk rock background.

"Hollywood" is a "bouncy" folk rock, synth-pop, electro-folk, electropop and psychedelic folk song. Ken Micallef of Electronic Musician described it as "a clubby disco beat underpin[ning] a mammoth bass line with freaky percussion, queasy arcing tones and madly treated vocals." It also contains house beats with elements of space age and retro music. Following the sound of twittering birds, the song opens with a four-chord sequence played on a Martin D-28 acoustic guitar; the riff was compared to the music of the Red Hot Chili Peppers by Rikky Rooksby, author of The Complete Guide to the Music of Madonna. It is followed by the sound of drums and synthesizers until after a minute, when the arrangement is pulled out, leaving just Madonna's vocals and the acoustic guitar accompaniment. Madonna's voice glides over pop beats throughout the song. During the final sequence, Madonna's singing is slowly morphed lower in pitch into a distorted, robotic voice and she raps, with the repeated phrase "Push the button". According to the sheet music published at Sheetmusicplus.com, "Hollywood" is written in common time with a moderately fast tempo of 126 beats per minute. It is composed in the key of B minor with Madonna's voice spanning from B_{3} to C_{5}. An abrupt shift of key takes place at about three minutes into the song, from B minor to C♯ minor, which according to Rooksby was utilized to give the song's closing choruses a different treatment. The song follows a basic sequence of Bm–D–A–G–Em as its chord progression.

Lyrically, it discusses American culture and greed, focusing on Hollywood as a place of pop stars and illusory dreams. The bridge opens with Madonna saying, "Music stations always play the same songs/I'm bored with the concept of right and wrong". Further, Madonna questions the Hollywood experience, singing, "How could it hurt you when it looked so good?". Alexis Petridis of The Guardian noted Madonna's vocals in the song are "high-pitched [to sound like a] little-girl", with the intention of "[underlying] the notion of innocence lost".

== Remixes ==
Several remixes of "Hollywood", done by DJs such as Jacques Lu Cont, The Micronauts, Paul Oakenfold, Deepsky and Victor Calderone, were included on physical releases of the single around the world. In August 2003, the song was remixed with "Into the Groove" and performed with Missy Elliott under the title "Into the Hollywood Groove" as part of a promotional campaign for clothing retailer, GAP. Copies of the promotional CD were given to customers and were not available for individual purchase. An extended version, "The Passengerz Mix", was also included on the remix album Remixed & Revisited (2003). A promotional video for the remix was also shot. Rob Walker of Slate considered the video "interesting because Madonna has always been praised as much for her ability to market herself as for her actual talent as a singer and performer". However, he noted that "[the singer] can't even get an actual commercial right. Maybe Madonna really is over." A parody of the commercial which satirized at Madonna's age was featured on the ninth season of MADtv & the 2003 French & Saunders Christmas special.

"Hollywood" was also remixed by American DJ duo Blow-Up. The remix was set to be included on Madonna's second remix album planned for 2004; however, it remained unreleased. A Billboard review by Michael Paoletta considered it a "funky dark remix". An unofficial remix was commissioned to DJ Junior Vasquez for designer Donatella Versace's spring/summer 2004 menswear show in Milan, in spite of the singer having a falling out with Vasquez, following the DJ releasing an unauthorized single titled "If Madonna Calls". The original version that Vasquez played at nightclubs contained an actual phone message from Madonna left on Vasquez's answering machine. Madonna's publicist Liz Rosenberg confirmed that this did not mean the singer would collaborate with Vasquez in the future since the commissioning of the remix was just a "personal favor" for Versace.

== Critical reception ==
"Hollywood" received mixed reviews from music critics. Michael Paoletta from Billboard described the song as "punky" and compared it to "Ray of Light" (1998). Dimitri Ebrlich of Vibe magazine gave a positive review for the song, describing it as "disarmingly self-deprecatory as it reflects on people's desperate attempts to make it in America's glamor industry", writing that it was a perfect fit for American Life. Jude Adam of Third Way magazine gave the song a positive review, considering it as "quirky, sunny, and sweet in perfect measures." Stephen Thompson of The A.V. Club considered the song as "actually catchy". Alexis Petridis of The Guardian noted that Madonna divulges in the song that not everyone who wants to make it in the movies succeeds. Jessica Winter from The Village Voice commented that in the song, "Madonna channels a generic teen-pop chanteuse". Dennis Ferrera from Out, while interviewing Madonna for her 2005 album Confessions on a Dance Floor, described the song as a "killer single". Another positive review by J. J. Evans from Naperville Sun described "Hollywood" as a track which best exemplifies Madonna's "silly way of writing" but felt that it worked in this case. Chris Heath from Yahoo! Music commented that "'Hollywood' breaks free of its inferior siblings to strike out as a sexy sliver of dance pop that's as good as anything on Music". Chuck Arnold from Entertainment Weekly found it ironic that Madonna was singing about Hollywood, given all her failed attempts at a successful movie career. Nonetheless, he concluded that "with its sweet guitar picking, this American Life single shines its light wherever you are".

Ian Youngs of BBC News noted that the song was another diatribe about fame and how difficult it is being in the public eye. He further added that it "ranks among the disappointments" on the album saying it feels lacklustre and commented about the "embarrassing rap". Ed Howard from Stylus Magazine commented that barring Madonna's rapping, "Hollywood" is at least engaging. Sal Cinquemani of Slant Magazine thought "following up 'American Life' with 'Hollywood' was nearly as ballsy" due to its lyrical content. Edna Gundersen of USA Today noted that the song "attest[s] to her undiminished skills as a shrewd pop composer". Michael Hubbard of musicOMH commented that everything rhymes with "Hollywood", and after commented the song would be better without these lazy lyrics, adding "[The song] has the name Madonna on it so it will sell, but it's hardly vintage stuff. Time for some musical reinvention to go with the incessant changes of image." In another review, Chuck Taylor from Billboard expressed his disappointment with the song. He explained that "Hollywood" is "a far cry from the ingenious fortitude displayed on so many previous singles of [Madonna's] two decades of career". He panned Ahmadzaï's limited electronic production and Madonna's excessive usage of acoustic guitar on the track, along with "whiney, preachy lyrics". Writing for The Sydney Morning Herald, Bernard Zuel called Ahmadzaï a "one-trick pony" for his production, but felt he pulled it off "on the groove-rich 'Hollywood'". Ben Wener from The Beaver County Times condemned the track as a "knowingly hypocritical attack on Hollywood". Writing for The Guardian, Jude Rogers praised its "fantastic Roland bassline and reflective sun-dappled guitar", placing the song at number 47 on her ranking of Madonna's singles, in honor of her 60th birthday.

== Chart performance ==
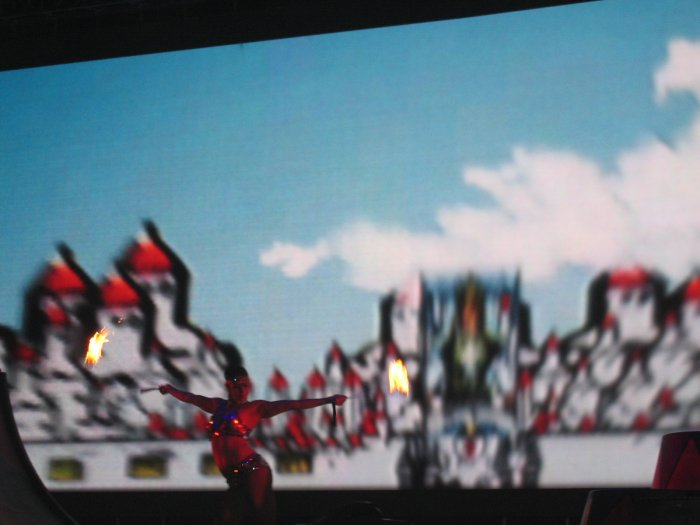
A firedancer performing during the "Hollywood" interlude on the 2004 Re-Invention World Tour

"Hollywood" failed to enter the Billboard Hot 100 in the United States, or the Bubbling Under Hot 100 chart. It was the first time since "Burning Up" (1983) that a Madonna single did not reach the Hot 100. However, it peaked at number one on both Billboard's Hot Dance Club Play and Hot Dance Singles Sales component charts. The debut of the "Hollywood" remixes atop the Dance Singles Sales chart gave Madonna her longest stretch of chart-topping titles on this chart, "Hollywood" being her sixth in a row. This stretch began with "Music" in 2000, followed by "Don't Tell Me", "What It Feels Like for a Girl", "Die Another Day" and "American Life". "Hollywood" was Madonna's 22nd number-one on the Dance Singles Sales chart, the most for any artist. On the Billboard Hot Singles Sales chart, the song debuted at number four, but did not accumulate enough points to appear on the Hot 100. At the 2003 Billboard Year-end recap, Madonna was the number two Dance Club Play artist and the top Dance Singles artist. "Hollywood" was ranked at numbers 19, seven, and 45 on the Hot Dance Club Play, Hot Dance Singles Sales and Hot Singles Sales charts respectively. Other than the dance charts, "Hollywood" also reached a peak of number 35 on the Adult Pop Songs. In Canada, the song peaked at number five on Canadian Singles Chart.

On July 19, 2003, "Hollywood" debuted at its peak of number two in the UK Singles Chart. The song was present for a total of seven weeks on the chart, and as of August 2008, has sold 59,633 copies according to the Official Charts Company. In Australia, "Hollywood" debuted on the chart at number 16, before falling out to number 37 the next week. On April 27, 2003, "Hollywood" debuted at number 55 on the Austrian Singles Chart, peaking at number 34 after four weeks. The song achieved moderate chart positions in both the Flemish and Wallonian territories in Belgium, peaking at numbers 14 and 32, respectively. Making its debut at its peak position of number 22, "Hollywood" charted for a total of 23 weeks in France during 2003. Between 2008 and 2009, the song charted for five weeks. On the Dutch Singles Chart, the song made its debut at number 20, spending a total of six weeks in the chart. On April 24, 2003, "American Life" debuted at number 20 on the Swedish Singles Chart. Similarly in Switzerland, the song debuted at number 15 on the Swiss Singles Chart, spending 13 weeks on the chart.

== Music video ==
Madonna portraying one of Guy Bourdin's works in the music video for "Hollywood". This scene, depicting Madonna with her legs spread on top of a TV set, was mentioned in the lawsuit against the video.

The music video for "Hollywood" was filmed at Universal Studios in Universal City, California and directed by Jean-Baptiste Mondino, who previously worked with Madonna on her videos for "Open Your Heart" (1986), "Justify My Love" (1990), "Human Nature" (1995), "Love Don't Live Here Anymore" (1996), and "Don't Tell Me" (2000). In the United States, it premiered on June 23, 2003, on VH1. Madonna had long been a fan of the work of French fashion photographer Guy Bourdin since about a decade ago, commenting on his photographs as "They're so sick and interesting. These girls, you have to see the look on their faces — they're really bizarre." Arianne Phillips created the costumes for the video and she described Madonna's looks as an homage to old Hollywood glamour, while trying to be literal as well as conceptual. She paid tributes to stars like Ginger Rogers, Jean Harlow and Mae West. According to Mondino's own words, the concept of the video was:

"Some kind of artifice that Hollywood can provide, that is so wide and has a graphic story-line about it as well as some humor about it, and to show the beauty, the scariness, the sexiness and the loneliness that one's success can be, 'cause everybody's dreaming about Hollywood, no matter what. The expectation can be very dangerous, and maybe for somebody like Madonna, who might be at a point, to realize that to be on the top is maybe not that important. That's what I feel about the video."

The music video features Madonna in different styles and fashions. It also includes her dripping in twenty million dollars' worth of vintage jewels and gowns in several transformations, including an original 25 carat ring and bracelet that was worn by West in the 1933 film, She Done Him Wrong. A real doctor (Dr. David Kish) was hired by Madonna to administer the fake shots, since she wanted to make the scenes appear real. The first day of shooting took place on June 2, 2003, and the scenes shot included the wall-of-mirrors, the massage, the botox injection and the ballet dancing sequences. The next day started with the French maid, the motel TV, the telephone conversation and the glamour shot scenes. Henry Keazor, one of the authors of Rewind, Play, Fast Forward: The Past, Present and Future of the Music Video, noted that Madonna exposed herself during the interventions portrayed in the video, by playing with the rumors and the stereotypes surrounding her.

After the release of the music video for "Hollywood", Samuel Bourdin, the son of Guy Bourdin, filed a federal lawsuit that accused Madonna of ripping off the work of his father. Bourdin said they are "strikingly similar" to pictures taken by his father from the 1950s to 1980s decades and published in Vogue Paris. He accused Madonna of copyright infringement over at least eleven of Bourdin's works, including one of Madonna with her legs spread on top of a TV set. "It's one thing to draw inspiration; it's quite another to simply plagiarize the heart and soul of my father's work", Bourdin said at the time. Included in Bourdin's federal complaint were side-by-side comparisons of his father's work with images with stills from the "Hollywood" video. According to Dustin Robertson, editor of the "Hollywood" video, the sequences featuring Madonna in a red dress staring into a mirror are the ones which were pointed by Bourdin's estate in the lawsuit. The lawsuit named Madonna, Warner Bros. Records, and Mondino as defendants. The details presented in the lawsuit read as: "Factors such as composition, background, wardrobe, lighting, narrative, camera angle, decor, and objects depicted are strikingly similar ... There are very few scenes or sequences in the 'Hollywood' video that are not directly derived from the Bourdin works." Details of the financial settlement are confidential, and Madonna acknowledged no wrongdoing in her liberal appropriation of the images. Bourdin's lawyer, John Koegel, said the parties reached a "very, very successful settlement", adding that terms of the deal did not allow him to discuss exact dollar amounts. In 2011, news website Independent Online disclosed the settled amount by Madonna to be $600,000. In 2009, the video was included on Madonna's compilation, Celebration: The Video Collection.

== Live performances ==
Madonna kissing Britney Spears during the medley performance of "Hollywood" and "Like a Virgin" at the 2003 MTV Video Music Awards

To start marketing American Life, Madonna performed the American Life Promo Tour. A performance on Tower's Fourth Street in Manhattan was presented to around 400 people and featured acoustic performances of "American Life", "Mother and Father", and "Hollywood". On August 28, 2003, Madonna opened the MTV Video Music Awards performing a medley of "Like a Virgin" and "Hollywood" with Britney Spears, Christina Aguilera, and Missy Elliott. Spears appeared on stage atop of a giant wedding cake, wearing a wedding gown and veil; she sang the first few lines of "Like a Virgin" before Aguilera appeared from behind the cake and joined her. Madonna then emerged from the cake wearing a black coat and hat and started singing "Hollywood" before proceeding to kiss Spears and Aguilera on the lips. Missy Elliott came out from a wedding chapel to sing her song "Work It" halfway through the performance. The whole performance was a tribute to Madonna and an homage to her performance of "Like a Virgin" at the awards' inaugural show in 1984.

The kiss generated strong reaction from the media and the celebrities alike. Nekesa Mumbi Moody from Associated Press deduced "Twenty years after the first MTV Video Music Awards, and not much has changed — Madonna still makes jaws drop and cheeks blush." Brian Hiatt from Entertainment Weekly felt that "The close-up of [Madonna] locking lips with the 21-year-old Spears was an indelible MTV moment — sexy, vaguely transgressive, and as meaningless as it was entertaining." Elysa Gardner from USA Today explained that the performance "offered a poignant reminder of MTV's role in defining a youth culture that has become something of a tease — winking at convention without offering any fresh alternatives." When asked about it, Madonna revealed, "I am kissing [Britney] and passing my energy on to her. Like kind of a mythological fairytale." The performance was listed by Blender magazine as one of the twenty-five sexiest music moments on television history. MTV listed the performance as the number-one opening moment in the history of the MTV Video Music Awards. In Madonna's 2004 Re-Invention World Tour, a remix interlude of "Hollywood" featured a breakdancer, a firedancer, a bellydancer, a tapdancer, and a skateboarder. The screens displayed animations of tarot cards. The performance was included in the I'm Going to Tell You a Secret live album and documentary. On the same tour, the performance of "Into the Groove" contained samples from the remix "Into the Hollywood Groove". Elements of "Into the Hollywood Groove" were also incorporated into The Celebration Tour and a snippet was sung acapella on March 11,2024.

== Track listings and formats ==
- UK CD single 1
1. "Hollywood" (radio edit) – 3:42
2. "Hollywood" (Paul Oakenfold full remix) – 7:01
3. "Hollywood" (Deepsky's Home Sweet Home vocal remix) – 7:34
- UK CD single 2
1. "Hollywood" (radio edit) – 3:42
2. "Hollywood" (Jacques Lu Cont's Thin White Duke Mix) – 7:09
3. "Hollywood" (The Micronauts Remix) – 6:25
- Australian, European, and US CD maxi-single
1. "Hollywood" (radio edit) – 3:42
2. "Hollywood" (Jacques Lu Cont's Thin White Duke Mix) – 7:09
3. "Hollywood" (The Micronauts Remix) – 6:25
4. "Hollywood" (Oakenfold full remix) – 7:00
5. "Hollywood" (Deepsky's Home Sweet Home vocal remix) – 7:34
6. "Hollywood" (Calderone & Quayle Glam Mix) – 9:22
- German, UK, and US 12-inch vinyl
1. "Hollywood" (The Micronauts Remix) – 6:25
2. "Hollywood" (Oakenfold full remix) – 7:01
3. "Hollywood" (Calderone & Quayle Glam Mix) – 9:22
4. "Hollywood" (Jacques Lu Cont's Thin White Duke Mix) – 7:09
5. "Hollywood" (Oakenfold 12-inch dub) – 7:01
6. "Hollywood" (Deepsky's Home Sweet Home vocal remix) – 7:34
- Digital single (2023)
1. "Hollywood" (radio edit) – 3:42
2. "Hollywood" (Jacques Lu Cont's Thin White Duke Mix) – 7:09
3. "Hollywood" (The Micronauts Remix) – 6:25
4. "Hollywood" (Oakenfold 12" Full Remix) – 7:00
5. "Hollywood" (Deepsky's Home Sweet Home vocal remix) – 7:34
6. "Hollywood" (Calderone & Quayle Glam Mix) – 9:22
7. "Hollywood" (Oakenfold 12" Dub) – 7:03

== Credits and personnel ==
- Madonna – lead vocals, background vocals, songwriter, producer
- Mirwais Ahmadzaï – songwriter, producer, guitars, programming
- Tim Young – audio mastering
- Mark "Spike" Stent – audio mixing

Credits for "Hollywood" are adapted from American Life liner notes.

== Charts ==
=== Weekly charts ===
Weekly chart performance for "Hollywood"
Chart (2003)	Peak position
Australia (ARIA)	16
Australian Dance (ARIA)	1
Austria (Ö3 Austria Top 40)	34
Belgium (Ultratop 50 Flanders)	14
Belgium (Ultratop 50 Wallonia)	32
Canada (Nielsen SoundScan)	5
Croatia (HRT)	3
Czech Republic (ČNS IFPI)	5
Denmark (Tracklisten)	12
European Hot 100 (Billboard)	3
Finland (Suomen virallinen lista)	8
France (SNEP)	22
Germany (GfK)	21
Hungary (Dance Top 40)	14
Hungary (Rádiós Top 40)	4
Hungary (Single Top 40)	2
Ireland (IRMA)	10
Italy (FIMI)	3
Netherlands (Dutch Top 40)	25
Netherlands (Single Top 100)	20
Polish Airplay (ZPAV)	4
Portugal (AFP)	2
Romania (Romanian Top 100)	8
Scottish Singles Sales (Official Charts)	7
Spain (Promusicae)	2
Sweden (Sverigetopplistan)	19
Switzerland (Schweizer Hitparade)	15
UK Singles (Official Charts)	2
UK Dance (Official Charts)	1
US Adult Pop Airplay (Billboard)	35
US Dance Club Songs (Billboard)	1
US Dance Singles Sales (Billboard)	1
US Dance Airplay (Billboard)	15
US Hot Singles Sales (Billboard)	4
US Hot AC (Radio & Records)	35
US CHR/Pop Indicator (Radio & Records)	40

=== Year-end charts ===
2003 year-end chart performance for "Hollywood"
Chart (2003)	Position
Italy (FIMI)	40
Romania (Romanian Top 100)	64
UK Singles (OCC)	149
US Dance Club Play (Billboard)	19
US Dance Singles Sales (Billboard)	7
US Hot Singles Sales (Billboard)	45

2004 year-end chart performance for "Hollywood"
Chart (2004)	Position
US Dance Singles Sales (Billboard)	18

== Sales ==
Sales for "Hollywood"
Region	Certification	Certified units/sales
France	—	42,891
United Kingdom	—	59,633

== Release history ==
Release dates and formats for "Hollywood"
Region	Date	Format(s)	Label(s)	Ref.
United States	May 27, 2003	Contemporary hit radio; rhythmic contemporary radio; hot AC radio	Warner Bros.	
United Kingdom	July 7, 2003	12-inch single; CD single	Warner Bros.	
United Kingdom	July 14, 2003	2×12-inch single; maxi-CD single	Warner Bros.	
Australia	July 14, 2003	CD single	Warner Bros.	
United States	July 15, 2003	12-inch single	Warner Bros.	
Germany	July 28, 2003	CD single	Warner Bros.	
Germany	August 4, 2003	12-inch single	Warner Bros.	

== See also ==
- List of number-one dance singles of 2003 (U.S.)

== Bibliography ==
- Clerk, Carol (2008). Madonna Style. Music Sales Group. ISBN 978-0-85712-218-6.
- Keazor, Henry; Wübbena, Thorsten (2010). Rewind, Play, Fast Forward: The Past, Present and Future of the Music Video. transcript Verlag. ISBN 978-3-8376-1185-4.
- O'Brien, Lucy (2008). Madonna: Like an Icon. Bantam Press. ISBN 978-0-552-15361-4.
- Rooksby, Rikky (2004). The Complete Guide to the Music of Madonna. Omnibus Press. ISBN 0-7119-9883-3.
- Shapiro, Ben (2005). Porn Generation: How Social Liberalism is Corrupting Our Future. Regnery Publishing. ISBN 978-0-89526-016-1.
- Taraborrelli, J. Randy (2008). Madonna: An Intimate Biography. Pan Books. ISBN 978-0-330-45446-9.
- Timmerman, Dirk (2007). Madonna Live! Secret Re-inventions and Confessions on Tour. Maklu. ISBN 978-90-8595-002-8.
