= Junior Vasquez =

American DJ and record producer (born 1949)

- Born: Donald Gregory Mattern; August 24, 1949 (age 77); Lancaster, Pennsylvania, U.S.
- Genre: House
- Occupations: Club DJ; record producer; remixer
- Years active: 1980s–present
- Labels: Tommy Boy; Virgin; EMI; Nervous

Junior Vasquez (born Donald Gregory Mattern; August 24, 1949) is an American club DJ, record producer and remixer prominent in the 1980s and 1990s. He has been referred to as one of the only club DJs of his time to gain international attention.

== Career ==
Mattern moved to New York City as a young man of 24 in 1971 with ambitions of becoming a fashion designer, briefly attending Fashion Institute of Technology (FIT) and working for a while as a hairdresser. Mattern soon became fascinated with New York nightlife, especially the work of DJ Larry Levan at the Paradise Garage. Despite his Italian and German ancestry, he adopted the stage name "Junior Vasquez" (inspired by the Latino neighborhoods he frequented) as a way to "reinvent" himself.

He began his career in music production in the 1980s. Vasquez worked with DJ and pop remixer/producer Shep Pettibone, and together they co-produced and edited numerous singles from artists like Madonna, Whitney Houston, Janet Jackson, MC Hammer, Prince, Pet Shop Boys and others. Vasquez landed a brief residency at Club Bassline, where he began to make a name for himself as a live DJ.

Many of Junior Vasquez's earliest underground hits were released under the pseudonym Ellis D, including the house track, "Work This Pussy". Vasquez also released the tracks "Just Like a Queen", "My Loleatta", "It's Scratched", and "Took My Love Away".

From 1989 to 1995, Vasquez was the DJ at the original Sound Factory, a club he co-founded with Richard Grant in the Chelsea district. Major record labels began soliciting Vasquez to produce club-friendly remixes for their top singers using his personal beat-driven house style. Due to a rise in demand from these labels, many singer and musicians like C+C Music Factory, David Morales, Björk, Marilyn Manson and Madonna were known to frequent his Sunday morning events. Working with many popular artists allowed Vasquez to create his own repertoire of exclusive "private collection" of authorized remixes (along with several unofficial remixes) which were not released to the market, and thus made his live sets even more distinctive to his following.

In 1994, Vasquez released his notably biggest single "Get Your Hands Off My Man". At this time he was also associated with the House of Xtravaganza, a ballroom "house" which enjoyed prominence in New York City at this time. In the early 1990s, Vasquez released his single "X", which sampled Danny Xtravaganza saying the word "extravaganza!" (The voice sample was taken from Danny Xtravaganza's 1990 single "Love the Life You Live".)

After the Sound Factory was closed in February 1995, Vasquez held residencies at the Tunnel (1995–1996), and at ArenA (held at the Palladium) (1996–1997) where his suspended booth was custom designed by designers Dolce & Gabbana. In 1997, he returned to the former site of the original Sound Factory, now called Twilo. Remodeled to include a custom-designed DJ booth for Vasquez's exclusive use and fitted with new cutting-edge audio technology known as "Phazon", Vasquez's residency at Twilo lasted until May 2001, when the venue was closed by order of the city. In 1997, Ian Jenkinson and Inner Rhythm Artists Tribal Gathering enlisted Vasquez for the largest single artist DJ event in UK history at the London Arena. Problems with the venue saw the event split between the two clubs: Ministry of Sound and Cream.

Vasquez held shorter-lived residencies at the various clubs in New York including, Exit Nightclub, the highest capacity club space in New York City where he called the Saturday to Sunday sets "Earth," Discothèque, Sound Factory (so-named by Richard Grant who retained legal rights to the name) and opened in a new space located in Hell's Kitchen section of Manhattan.

In addition to his work as a DJ and remixer, he has co-produced albums for John Mellencamp, For Real, Lisa Lisa, and Cyndi Lauper as well as individual LP tracks for Madonna, Cher, Wild Orchid, and Kristine W. Vasquez, along with his former record label Junior Vasquez Music, is also known for introducing new artists, including many crossover singers, to dance/pop music scene, including Vernessa Mitchell, Jason Walker, Deepa Soul, Casey Stratton, Quentin Elias, Vivian Green, and Sam Harris. Finally on June 28, 2021, after nearly 40 years in the music business, Vasquez was inducted as a voting member into the Recording Academy (Grammys).

=== Madonna controversy ===
Vasquez had a public falling-out with Madonna in 1996, after the release of an unauthorized single titled "If Madonna Calls". The original version that Vasquez plays at nightclubs contains what is widely believed to be an actual phone message from Madonna left on Vasquez's answering machine.

=== Junior Vasquez and the Phenomenon of "So Get Up" ===
In late 1993, a Portuguese electronic music duo, Underground Sound of Lisbon, then unknown in the U.S., sent a 12" white-label promo of their national club hit "So Get Up" featuring Ithaka (aka Greek-American lyricist/vocalist Ithaka Darin Pappas) to an acquaintance in New York. This individual managed to get the record into the DJ Booth of The Sound Factory while Junior Vasquez was performing a set.

Reportedly, Vasquez played the song, and the So Get Up a cappella itself, several times that same night, but refused to tell anyone who the music was by, and where he had gotten it. The song soon became Junior Vasquez' trademark theme song at the club and it created an element of hype and mystery around it. It was nearly ten months later, when Vasquez revealed the origins of the track, leading to contract offers from a handful of dance music labels. But it was the company he was currently working with at the time, Tribal America Records, backed by I.R.S. Records (owned by Miles Copeland III) who signed "So Get Up" to an international licensing deal. So Get Up went global, selling approximately 80,000 copies in vinyl and more than a million on compilations.

Within the licensing arrangement, Vasquez was asked to do his own remix of the song. The So Get Up (Junior's Factory Mix) was a hit in its own right, and in 1995 appeared on the compilation Cream Live (mixed by Graeme Park, Pete Tong, Paul Oakenfold and Justin Robertson), released by Deconstruction Records. The double-album peaked at the #2 spot on the UK's Top Compilations charts in June 1995.

So Get Up appearing on a UK compilation that sold upwards of two hundred-thousand units, aided in solidifying the song's presence in Europe and beyond. This brought in, (directly and indirectly), more than 40 million Euros to the Portuguese economy thru both records sales and dance event ticket sales due to the country's newfound popularity as an Rave destination, (sometimes held in exotic venues such as castles). The electronic music community branded the country A Paradise Called Portugal.

== Discography ==
=== Selected singles ===
- "Get Your Hands Off My Man" (1994)
- "X" (1994)
- "Lift Me Up" (1995)
- "If Madonna Calls" (1996)

=== Selected remixes ===
- Amanda Lear – "I Just Wanna Dance Again"
- Angelique Kidjo featuring Peter Gabriel – "Salala"
- Annie Lennox – "No More I Love You's/Take Me to the River/Downtown Lights (Medley)"
- Beyoncé – "Krazy in Luv"
- Billie Ray Martin – "Your Loving Arms"
- Britney Spears – "Gimme More" (remixed by Junior Vasquez & Johnny Vicious)
- Britney Spears – "Piece of Me" (remixed by Junior Vasquez & Johnny Vicious)
- Britney Spears – "Womanizer"
- Björk – "I Miss You" (Unreleased)
- Bruce Roberts and Donna Summer – "Whenever There Is Love"
- Casey Stratton – "House of Jupiter"
- CeCe Peniston – "Hit By Love"
- Charlotte – "Skin"
- Cher – "Love and Understanding"
- Cher – "One by One"
- Christina Aguilera – "Ain't No Other Man"
- Cyndi Lauper – "Come On Home"
- Cyndi Lauper – "Hey Now (Girls Just Wanna Have Fun)"
- David Bowie – "Little Wonder"
- Destiny's Child – "Girl"
- Donna Summer – "I'm a Rainbow"
- Donna Summer – "Melody of Love (Wanna Be Loved)"
- Donna Summer – "My Life"
- Donna Summer – "Whenever There is Love" duet with Bruce Roberts
- Duran Duran featuring Grandmaster Flash – "White Lines"
- Elton John – "Made in England"
- Funky Green Dogs – "Fired Up!"
- Gloria Estefan – "Higher"
- Irene Cara – "All My Heart"
- Janet Jackson – "Runaway"
- Janice Robinson & Sandy B – "The Real Me (It Gets Better)"
- Joi Cardwell – "After the Rain"
- John Mellencamp – "Key West Intermezzo"
- Jonny McGovern – "Orange Juice"
- Joyce Sims – "All & All"
- Justin Timberlake – "Rock Your Body"
- k.d. lang – "If I Were You"
- Ké – "Strange World"
- Kristine W – "Feel What You Want"
- Kylie Minogue – "Too Far"
- Lalo Schifrin – "Theme from Mission: Impossible" (Adam Clayton and Larry Mullen, Jr. version)
- Lisa Lisa – "Acid Rain"
- Lisa Lisa – "If This Is Real"
- Lisa Stansfield – "All Around the World"
- Livin' Joy – "Dreamer"
- Madonna – "Bedtime Story"
- Madonna – "Hollywood" (authorized release for a fashion show hosted by Donatella Versace)
- Madonna – "Like a Prayer" (unreleased)
- Madonna – "Rescue Me"
- Madonna – "Secret"
- Madonna – "I Want You" (unreleased)
- Madonna – "You'll See" (unreleased)
- Madonna – "Crazy For You" (unreleased)
- Madonna – "Human Nature" (unreleased)
- Mariah Carey – Bringin' On the Heartbreak
- Mariah Carey – "Heartbreaker/If You Should Ever Be Lonely"
- Maroon 5 – "This Love"
- Mary J. Blige – "Your Child"
- MC Hammer – "Pray" (remixed by Junior Vasquez & Shep Pettibone)
- Michael Jackson – "Off The Wall" (eight remixes were made, but only one released)
- Michael Jackson – "You Rock My World" (remixed, but never released)
- Moby – "Into The Blue"
- Nelly Furtado – "I'm Like a Bird"
- Paula Abdul featuring Ofra Haza – "My Love Is for Real"
- Peggy Wood – "Climb Ev'ry Mountain"
- Pearl Jam – "Better Man"
- Pet Shop Boys – "Yesterday, When I Was Mad"
- Pink – "U + Ur Hand"
- Pink – "Stupid Girls" (remixed by Dynamix & Junior Vasquez)
- Prince – "Cream"
- Prince – "Thieves in the Temple"
- Queen – "Bicycle Race"
- Rob Thomas – "Lonely No More"
- Rickie Lee Jones – "Living It Up" (unreleased)
- The Ride Committee featuring Roxy – "Get Huh!"
- Sandy B – Nothingness
- Seduction – "Feel Brand New"
- Shannon – "Let The Music Play"
- Siouxsie and the Banshees – "Fear (of the Unknown)"
- Skunk Anansie – "Brazen (Weep)"
- Sounds of Blackness – "Children of the World"
- Spice Girls – "Wannabe"
- Steve Silk Hurley & CeCe Peniston – "He Loves Me 2"
- Tevin Campbell – "Strawberry Letter 23"
- The B-52's – "(Meet) the Flintstones"
- Toni Braxton – "Unbreak My Heart"
- Underground Sound of Lisbon ft. Ithaka "So Get Up" (Junior Vasquez Factory Remix)
- Vanessa L. Williams – "You Are Everything"
- Vernessa Mitchell – "Reap (What You Sow)
- Whitney Houston – "Greatest Love of All"
- Whitney Houston – "How Will I Know"
- Whitney Houston – "I Didn't Know My Own Strength"
- Whitney Houston – "I Learned from the Best"
- Whitney Houston – "I Wanna Dance with Somebody (Who Loves Me)"
- Whitney Houston – "Million Dollar Bill"
- Whitney Houston – "Step by Step"
- Whitney Houston – "Fine"
- Wild Orchid – "Talk to Me"
- Zelma Davis – "Power"

=== Albums ===
- To the Rhythm (1998)
- J.M.O. After Service (2001)
- Junior's Magic Orchestra (2003)

=== Mixes/compilations ===
- The Future Sound of New York (1994)
- This Is the Sound of Tribal (1994)
- Best of Junior Vasquez: Just Like a Queen (1995)
- 1997: Live, Vol. 1 / 2 (1997/1998)
- Best of Junior Vasquez, Vol. 2 (1999)
- Twilo, Vol. 1: Junior Vasquez (2000)
- DJ19 Plays J.M.O. Perspective Service (2001)
- Junior's Nervous Breakdown (2001)
- Junior's Nervous Breakdown 2: Demented (2001)
- Earth Music / Vol. 2 (2002)
- Anthem / Vol. 2 (2003/2004)
- Ageha, Vol. 4 (2004)
- Party Groove: White Party, Vol. 7 (2006)
- Generation Next (2009)
