= Wealthy Theatre =

Movie theater in Grand Rapids, Michigan, United States

- Wealthy Street Theatre

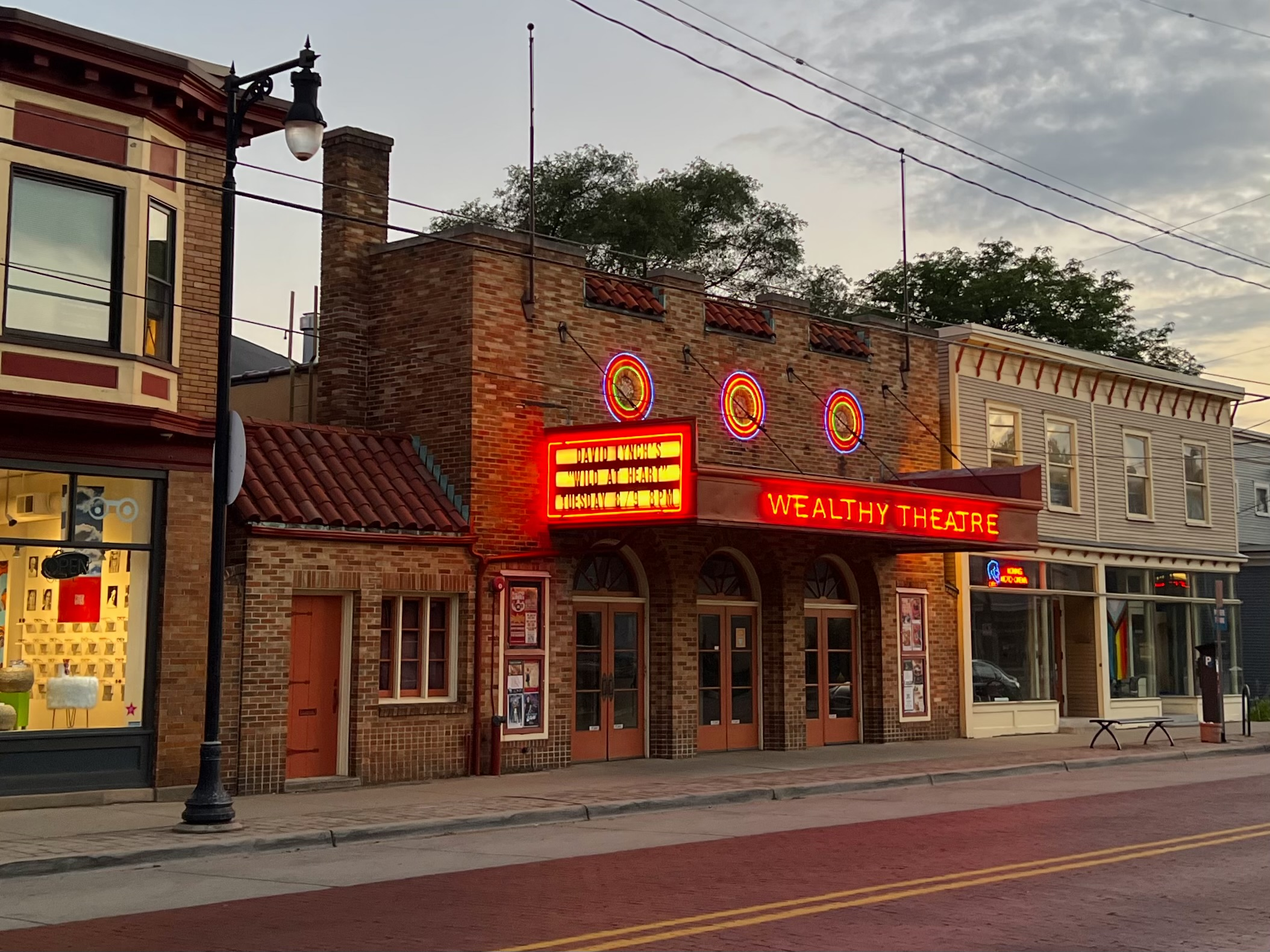
- The façade
- Interactive map of Wealthy Theatre
- Former names: Pastime Vaudette
- Address: 1130 Wealthy Street Southeast; Grand Rapids, Michigan; United States
- Coordinates: 42.955303°N 85.6407849°W
- Owner: Grand Rapids Community Media Center
- Capacity: 400/60 (main auditorium/micro-cinema)
- Type: Concert-ready community theatre
- Designation: City Historic Landmark
- Current use: Community theatre, performance center
- Production: Concert, live performance, movie

Construction
- Opened: 1911
- Closed: 1970-1999
- Rebuilt: 1999
- Years active: 27 (since renovation)
- Architect: Pierre Lindhout

Website
- www.grcmc.org/theatre

Wealthy Theatre is an American movie theatre and performance center in Grand Rapids, Michigan. It is currently operated by the Grand Rapids Community Media Center, a non-profit corporation. Wealthy Theatre is a mixed-use facility, capable of hosting live music, film, theatre and dance.

== History ==
=== Vaudeville to films ===
Wealthy Theatre was constructed in 1911 for vaudeville and live theater, and later became a neighborhood movie house. The original name of the venue was the Pastime Vaudette. Due to the decline in popularity of vaudeville, the Pastime closed its doors before the end of the decade, becoming a warehouse for the Michigan Aircraft Company during World War I.

The Theatre was renamed Wealthy Theatre (the Wealthy Street theatre) in the 1920s after being purchased by Oscar and Lillian Varneau and resumed operation as a movie house.

=== Bombing ===
In 1930, theaters in the area had a labor dispute with the union over hiring non-union staff. Two union projectionists blew up the rear of Wealthy Theatre with dynamite on March 19. Weeks earlier, explosions also took place at two other Grand Rapids theatres, with bombs planted in their ticket offices. The projectionists also confessed to the March 17 bombing of Muskegon's Regent Theatre (eventually demolished in 1972).

=== Restoration ===
By the 1960s it had shifted to foreign films, and by the mid-1970s, operations ceased. The building stood empty and decaying for more than 25 years before the South East Economic Development neighborhood association launched a capital campaign to fund its restoration. The theatre re-opened in 1999 as an independent not-for-profit community arts center.

In 2005 Wealthy Theatre was acquired by the Grand Rapids Community Media Center, a non-profit organization operating the local public-access cable TV channel, GRTV, as well as community radio station 88.1FM WYCE, and The Rapidian, an online citizen journalism platform.

== Facilities ==
=== Peter Wege Auditorium ===
The Peter Wege Auditorium is the primary venue of Wealthy Theatre. The capacity is 400 persons, with multiple barrier-free sections. The auditorium is named after its main benefactor, Peter Wege of Steelcase, a furniture manufacturer founded in the city. His gift in the 1990s helped renovate and restore this space to its present condition.

=== Dirk Koning Micro-Cinema ===
The Koning Micro-Cinema is the secondary space at 1130 Wealthy SE, in the same building as the primary space (The Peter Wege Auditorium). The capacity is 60 persons, with four barrier-free available. The Koning is named after Community Media Center's founding director, the late Dirk Koning. The Micro-Cinema space was created in 2007 in response to the need for a smaller, more intimate gathering space. This smaller space serves for movies, smaller comedy events, lectures, forums, acoustic musical performances and other uses.
