= Private Eyes (nightclub) =

Private Eyes was a video nightclub located at 12 West 21st Street in Manhattan. The club was owned by Robert Shalom. It was a popular nightspot in the 1980s that catered to a variety of growing underground music scenes in its heyday. With 34 television screens, Private Eyes had an unusually advanced state-of-the-art video and sound system for its time.

== History ==
Due to the rise of MTV, the popularity of music videos increased and it reinforced the visuals in pop music. 25-year-old Robert Shalom capitalized off this burgeoning visual art form and opened Private Eyes on July 17, 1984. Steve Sukman, vice president for program relations of the club, told Billboard magazine, "We have a commitment to music videos ... and we work very closely with record companies."

The 500-person-capacity club did not have a defined dance area. "It's like a living room with the coffee table pushed aside," said Sukman. Due to the club having 34 television screens, New York magazine described it as "a department-store television section, except at Private Eyes you can have a beer and you can’t change the channel." The highly equipped club took advantage of new technology. Its tape library was cost-effectively built on VHS to deliver high quality. By 1985, the club had nine tape decks to be programmed onto any of the screens. Video jockeys were able to offer numerous combinations of promotional clips.

Actress Bette Midler had a viewing party for her HBO concert film Art or Bust at the club in August 1984.

Pop star Madonna had her Like a Virgin album release party at the club on November 7, 1984. Attendees included artists Andy Warhol and Jean-Michel Basquiat.

Swedish actor and filmmaker Dolph Lundgren worked as a doorman at Private Eyes, notably when he started dating singer Grace Jones.

In 1992, Private Eyes was purchased by a few of the owners of The Sound Factory, and it was reopened as the Sound Factory Bar.
