= The Sound Factory (nightclub) =

Nightclub that was in New York City's Manhattan

Coordinates: 40°44′25.96″N 73°59′29.77″W

The Sound Factory was a nightclub first located 532 West 27th Street and then 618 West 46th Street in New York City's Manhattan. The Sound Factory was an integral venue during a peak period of house music in New York. Prominent DJs, artists, and parties appeared at the club. It was in operation from 1989 to 1995. There were other reincarnations of the club until 2004.

== History ==
In 1989, Christine Visca, Phil Smith and Richard Grant opened the Sound Factory in a converted warehouse at 530 West 27th Street in Manhattan's Chelsea neighborhood. DJ Junior Vasquez‘s association with vogue-ball houses the House of Xtravaganza and the House of Aviance helped bring the Harlem ballroom scene to the downtown club scene.

Smith became increasingly involved in The Sound Factory Bar, a smaller offshoot gay club. After harassment by the police, the owners of the Sound Factory decided to close the club in 1995.

In 1995, Smith converted the venue into the nightclub Twilo, which closed in 2001.

Grant reopened a new club called SoundFactory in a warehouse at 618 West 46th Street, but after facing legal issues in 2004, the club was closed.

== The Sound Factory Bar ==
The Sound Factory Bar was an offshoot at 12 West 21st Street that was in operation from 1992 to 1997. The club was previously called Private Eyes which was a popular nightspot in the late 1980s and the early 1990s that for its time had an unusually advanced state-of-the-art video and sound system. In the mid 1990s Private Eyes was then purchased by two of the three owners of The Sound Factory, and, since the space was smaller, it was renamed the Sound Factory Bar.

When the Sound Factory closed in 1995, the Sound Factory Bar continued to operate. Wednesdays housed the recently resurrected Underground Network parties, hosted and promoted by recording artist Barbara Tucker and Don Welch, with Grammy Award winner Little Louie Vega as resident DJ. On Thursday nights, "Factoria 21", a tribal house gay night with DJ Merritt and Lord G, and on Friday nights, "Godfather of House" Frankie Knuckles helmed the decks. On Sunday afternoons, it was the host for "Body Positive Tea Dances", a social for HIV positive men and their friends. The DJs were Mark Cicero and Mark Thomas. Closing out the weekend on Sunday evenings, "Purgatory" a tribal and progressive house gay night with DJ Merritt and DJ Andrew Tonio. One of the most notorious events was a weekly party called MILK Mondays from DJ TPromix that after several years at this location went on to thrive for nine years around the city. Also, (in the latter Cheetah years) Cafe con Leche, Cafe Futuro, and Asseteria were weekly Sunday parties.

In 1997, the Sound Factory Bar was reopened as Cheetah. The club was closed in 1999.

== See also ==
- Superclub
