= La Martinique =

1940s nightclub in Manhattan

Coordinates: 40.76436°N 73.97657°W

La Martinique was a popular nightclub in New York City, United States during the 1940s. Situated in a basement at 57 West 57th Street, the club was owned and operated by Dario Goldfarb and Jim Vernon. It was at La Martinique that Mr. & Mrs. Walt Disney would host the after party following the October 23, 1941 premiere of Dumbo at the Broadway theatre. The club is remembered for launching the careers of many singers of the era, including Dick Haymes, Danny Kaye, Jackie Miles, Sunny Skylar, and Zero Mostel, as well as playing host to more established performers, such as Jo Stafford who had a six-month residency there beginning in February 1945. La Martinique was one of several clubs to hold special events on Sunday evenings, generally considered a slow night for the clubs. An edition of the Sunday Frolics from April 1946 advertised one such evening, with Joey Adams as the host, and Rolly Rolls, the Merry Parisian, as the "honored guest". In addition the evening featured "celebrities of the stage and screen" and the club's new spring revue. The club was closed by the early 1950s, with Josephine Baker opening a new establishment on the original La Martinique site in 1952.
