= Metrosource =

American LGBTQ magazine

- Categories: Gay periodical
- Publisher: Bent Share Entertainment, LLC
- Total circulation: 127,665 (2020)
- Founded: 1990
- Company: Bent Share Entertainment, LLC
- Country: United States
- Based in: New York City
- Language: English
- Website: www.metrosource.com
- ISSN: 1529-935X

Metrosource is an American LGBTQ magazine. The bi-monthly gay and lesbian lifestyle magazine and business directory has three editions: Metrosource NY (Metrosource New York), Metrosource LA (Metrosource Los Angeles) and Metrosource National. The magazine is distributed in print and digital formats.

== History and profile ==
Metrosource was first published in 1990 as a local New York publication, the magazine has been distributed nationally since the mid-1990s. Metrosource is geared towards the modern metropolitan gay community. Metrosource covers popular culture, entertaining, design, travel, health, HIV, fitness, and telling the stories of gay and gay-friendly people. Metrosource connects its readers with the businesses that want to support the LGBT community.

Publisher, and former owner, Rob Davis had a vision with a dual purpose: to create a publication with stories and imagery that readers could be proud to read and display in their homes and share with friends and family; and to create a place where advertisers could let LGBT people know that their patronage is welcome at their places of business.

In March 2017, Metrosource was acquired by Davler Media Group (DMG), an integrated marketing and content company.

In February 2019, Metrosource was acquired by Bent Share Entertainment, LLC.

Metrosource is the second largest gay and lesbian publication in the United States.
