= Blake Allen =

American composer and viola player (born 1988)

- Born: Blake Liahona Allen; July 21, 1988 (age 38); Tucson, Arizona, U.S.
- Occupations: Composer; Violist; Music Director
- Spouse: Marti Gould Cummings (m. 2016–2022)
- Website: www.blakeallen.org

Blake Liahona Allen (born July 21, 1988, in Tucson, Arizona) is an American composer and viola player who is most known for writing The Ceiling, Insomnia—which debuted at Carnegie Hall— and The Shards of an Honor Code Junkie, music directing the 2019 revival of Over Here!, writing the theme song for the talk show Doris Dear's Gurl Talk, and appearing on Shade: Queens of NYC.

== Early life and education ==
Blake Liahona Allen was born in Tucson, Arizona on July 21, 1988, the fourth child of pianist Marsha Allen (née Wilcox) and San Allen, an engineer and chief operating officer for Winchester Electronics. His family moved to St. Petersburg, Florida shortly after his birth, then to Gainesville before eventually settling in El Paso, Texas, where he spent most of his youth. He grew up a member of The Church of Jesus Christ of Latter-day Saints and was in the viola sections of both the El Paso Symphony Orchestra and Las Cruces Symphony while attending Franklin High School.

Allen studied viola performance at Brigham Young University and worked at the Primrose International Viola Archive at Lee Library.

== Career ==
Allen was artist-in-residence at Banff Centre for Arts and Creativity in 2014 and was principal of the Little Orchestra. He has played with the New York Pops. He was Rob Fisher's music assistant from 2012 til 2022.

Allen joined the cast of Shade: Queens of NYC at its inception in October 2017, as Blake Allen, the then-spouse to Marti Gould Cummings. The series documents the daily reality of lives as Manhattan drag queens. In the series, Allen also music directed, arranged, and performed in several episodes culminating in the album A Very Marti Holiday, an album of Christmas music featuring Daphne Rubin-Vega, Cady Huffman, and Lesli Margherita to raise money for the Ali Forney Center.

In December 2017, Allen premiered a musical, The Shards of an Honor Code Junkie, starring Alison Fraser, Teal Wicks, Kristy Cates, Hannah Cruz, and Michael Lowney. The musical was inspired by a friend's suicide while he was a sophomore in college. After the sold-out world premiere of shards in 2017 as a benefit concert for The Trevor Project, Allen's classical-crossover score was picked up by No Reverse Records to be released in July 2021 as a storybook album.

Allen was one of nine composers and lyricists involved with the Off-Broadway musical Folk Wandering, which premiered in March 2018.

In 2019, Allen won the 2019 BroadwayWorld Cabaret Award for Best Recurring Series for his "An Evening With... Series" as well as the award for Best Special Event (Solo) for Marti Gould Cummings's Marti & The Cummers while being nominated for Best Musical Director and Best Independent Album, for his An Evening With..., Vol. 1 The same year, Allen won the 2019 GLAM Award for Best Cabaret for his work with Tina Burner on Witch Perfect at Club Cumming with fellow performers Bootsie Lefaris and Tammy Spenks. In 2020, Allen won Best Arrangement of the Decade for Mack the Knife and was nominated for My Funny Valentine, Best Musical Director, and Best Recurring Series for An Evening With... Series. Allen also performed at Birdland with Lortel and Drama Desk Award winner Kuhoo Verma in early 2020.

Allen produced, music directed, and orchestrated the 2019 Off-Broadway revival of Over Here! at the Triad Theatre with Will Nunziata directing. The show starred Debbie Gravitte, Jessica Hendy, Haley Swindal, and Nikka Graff Lanzarone.

Allen also wrote a one-act play, Kelly [1955] based upon the Kelly-Hopkinsville Encounter, which premiered at the Hudson Guild Theatre in March 2019 and also starred Jessica Hendy.

In 2020, Allen was an artist in residence at the Kimmel Nelson Harding Center for the Arts in Nebraska City, Nebraska, after which he released his album Sonatas on Earth Day 2020. The album features music which premiered at The Metropolitan Museum of Art. It debuted at #4 on the Billboard charts Classical, where it stayed in the top 10 for two weeks.

At the height of the 2020 Pandemic, Allen wrote Livin' the Dreamboat with lyricist Claire Tran for the Astoria Performing Arts Center in Astoria, Queens. Also in 2020, Allen wrote the theme song and incidental music to Doris Dear's Gurl Talk, a weekly lifestyle show on Broadway on Demand. Allen was music director for the Doris Dear Christmas Special, which featured Tony Nominee Karen Mason.

Allen's Insomnia was developed for Carnegie Hall's Weill Recital Hall and premiered November 8, 2022. The piece was written and performed by Jeanna de Waal, Cree Carrico, Argus Quartet, and Christopher Koelzer. The album was released on No Reverse Records in 2024 featuring the Carnegie Hall cast.

Allen wrote Farmyard Follies with Tina Burner. The show debuted in 2023 in Provincetown at the Crown & Anchor and was filmed for a forthcoming documentary feature. The show had been in development for three years before its debut. Allen and Seeber collaborated for several years on cabaret shows, including releasing two full-length albums and the Christmas single "I'd Rather Be Naughty Than Nice". Allen and Seeber were nominated for a 2021 MAC Award for Best Recording (LaMott Friedman Award) for their album and tour Maybe This Time. They collaborated for seven years on the international hit Witch Perfect based upon Disney's Hocus Pocus (1993 film) including winning the 2020 GLAM Award for Best Cabaret.

Shortly after Allen received his PhD from NYU Steinhardt in spring of 2024, Allen began work with librettist Will Nunziata on an operatic adaption of Virginia Woolf's 1931 novel The Waves.

Allen is developing The Ceiling, a new musical based upon the O. Henry Prize winning short story The Ceiling (2001) by Kevin Brockmeier. The world premiere concert was presented at (le) Poisson Rouge on October 5, 2026.

== Personal life ==
Allen moved to New York City in 2011 and married New York City Council candidate and drag artist, Marti Gould Cummings in 2016. They divorced in 2022.

== Television ==
Year	Title	Role	Notes
2017	Shade: Queens of NYC	Himself; music arranger	Supporting Role
2018	Mozart in the Jungle	Audition musician	
2020	Doris Dear Gurl Talk	Composer	
2020	The Doris Dear Christmas Special	Music director; composer	
2021	In the Know Dragged	Himself; Emma Tallgal	
2024	Conversion	Composer	Album producer

== Theatre ==
Year	Production	Role	Venue	Ref(s)
2017	The Shards of an Honor Code Junkie	Composer; Lyricist; Book Writer	Metro Baptist Church	
2018	Folk Wandering	Composer; Lyricist; Musician	Pipeline Theatre Co.	
2019	Kelly [1955]	Playwright; Composer	Hudson Guild Theatre	
2019	Over Here! Revival	Music Director; Arranger	Triad Theatre	
2020	Livin' the Dreamboat	Composer; Orchestrator	Astoria Performing Arts Center	
2022	Insomnia	Composer; Lyricist	Weill Recital Hall	
2023	Farmyard Follies	Composer; Lyricist; Book	Provincetown, MA	
2026	The Ceiling	Composer; Lyricist; Book	LPR	

== Discography ==
Title	Details	Peak chart positions					
Title	Details	Billboard Classical	Billboard Cast Album	iTunes Classical	iTunes Top 100	iTunes Vocal	Amazon Classical
A Very Marti Holiday	Release date: 2017; Label: Cowboy Bear Ninja & Blake Allen						
An Evening With..., Vol. 1	Release date: 2019; Label: Traguna Productions & Blake Allen; Nominated for Best Album at 2019 BroadwayWorld Awards.						
Sonatas	Release date: 22 April 2020 (Earth Day); Label: Traguna Productions & Blake Allen	4		1	40		
One Thing Is For Certain (Original Motion Picture Soundtrack)	Release date: 4 February 2021; Label: Traguna Productions & Blake Allen						
Tina Burner Maybe This Time	Release date: 20 March 2021; Label: Tina Burner					2	
The Shards of an Honor Code Junkie	Release date: September 17, 2021; Label: No Reverse Records		12	2	78		1
Conversion (Original Motion Picture Soundtrack	Release date: June 2, 2024; Label: Chronicle Cinema & Blake Allen						
Insomnia	Release date: August 9, 2024; Label: No Reverse Records	3		1	99		
"—" denotes releases that did not chart

== Awards and nominations ==
Year	Award	Category	Work	Result	Ref.
2006	National String Orchestra Award			Won	
2019	BroadwayWorld Cabaret Awards	Best Recurring Series	An Evening With...	Won	
2019	BroadwayWorld Cabaret Awards	Best Special Event - Solo	Marti at Lincoln Center	Won	
2019	BroadwayWorld Cabaret Awards	Best Musical Director	An Evening With...	Nominated	
2019	BroadwayWorld Cabaret Awards	Best Independent Album	An Evening With... Vol. 1	Nominated	
2019	GLAM Awards	Best Cabaret	With Perfect	Won	
2019	GLAM Awards	Best Cabaret	Marti at Lincoln Center	Nominated	
2020	BroadwayWorld Cabaret Awards	Best Arrangement	Mack the Knife	Won	
2020	BroadwayWorld Cabaret Awards	Best Arrangement	My Funny Valentine	Nominated	
2020	BroadwayWorld Cabaret Awards	Best Musical Director	Over Here!; An Evening With...; Witch Perfect	Nominated	
2020	BroadwayWorld Cabaret Awards	Best Recurring Series	An Evening With...	Nominated	
2020	BroadwayWorld Cabaret Awards	Best Special Event - Multiple	Over Here!	Nominated	
2021	Telly Awards	Online Scripted Web Series	Doris Dear's Gurl Talk	Silver	
