= Lanzarone =

Lanzarone is a surname. Notable people with the surname include:

- Ben Lanzarone (1938–2024), American composer
- Nikka Graff Lanzarone (born 1983), American actress
