= Tina Burner =

American drag queen

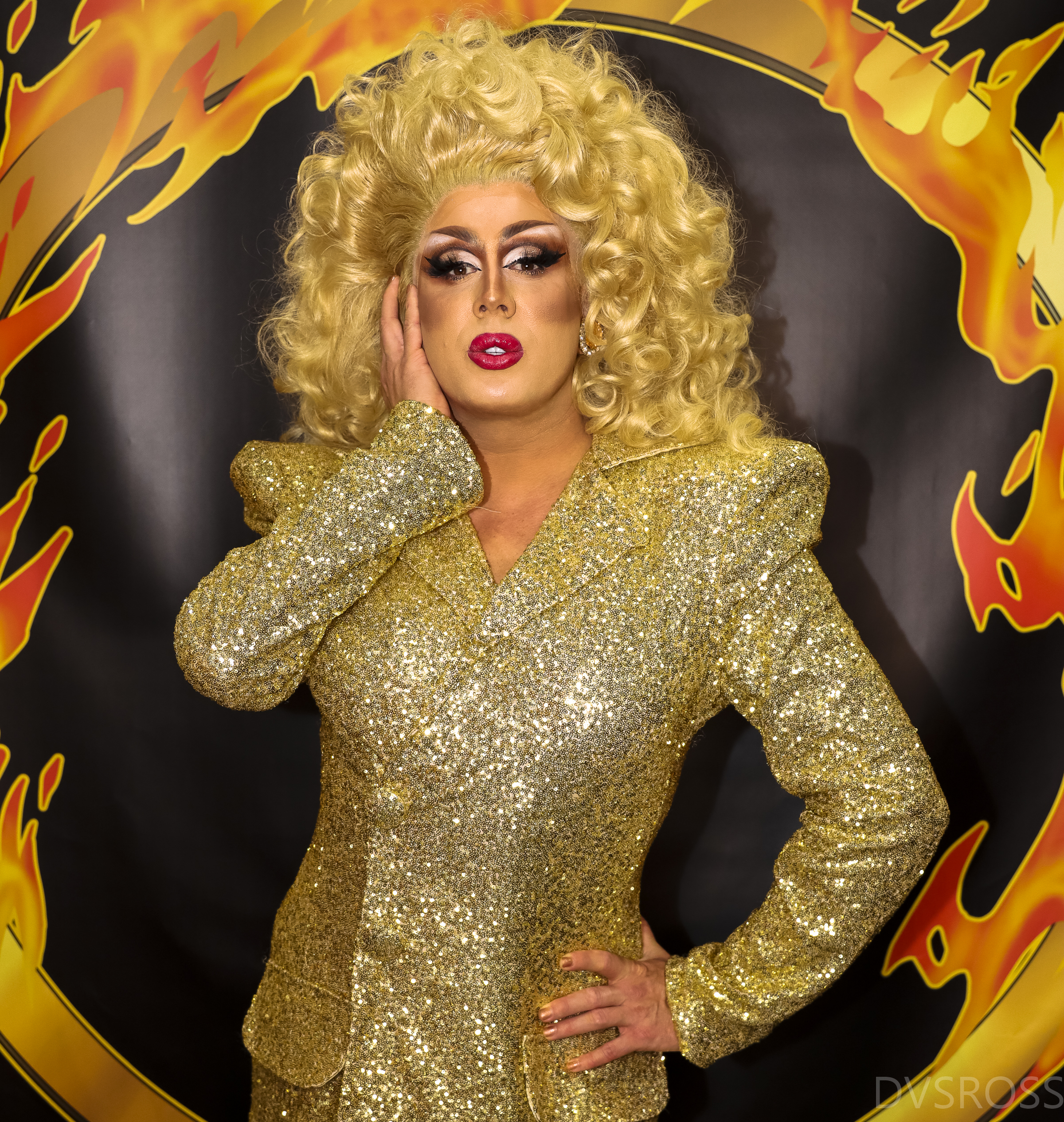
- Tina Burner at RuPaul's DragCon LA, 2022
- Born: Kristian Seeber; November 10, 1980 (age 45); Lowville, New York, U.S.
- Occupation: Drag queen
- Known for: Shade: Queens of NYC; RuPaul's Drag Race (season 13) 7th Place; RuPaul's Drag Race All Stars (season 10)
- Website: tinaburner.com

Kristian Seeber (born November 10, 1980), known professionally as Tina Burner, is an American drag performer most known for appearing in Shade: Queens of NYC, on the thirteenth season of RuPaul's Drag Race, and on the tenth season of RuPaul's Drag Race All Stars. He was a part of a boy band named 5th Ring.

== Early life ==
Seeber was born and raised in Lowville, New York to German American parents. He lived in Boca Raton, Florida during his teen years.

== Career ==
Seeber used to be in a boy band. Tina Burner has been named National Miss Comedy Queen and competed on thirteenth season of RuPaul's Drag Race, where she was eliminated in episode 11 and finished in seventh place. She also worked with fashion designer Nicolas Putvinski for a time.

In 2021, Tina Burner was nominated for a 2021 MAC Award for Best Recording (LaMott Friedman Award) for their album and tour Maybe This Time.

In 2022, Tina Burner toured the world with their show, Witch Perfect with fellow RPDR stars Scarlet Envy and Alexis Michelle. Written by Tina Burner and writing partner Blake Allen, the show is a parody of the Disney movie Hocus Pocus. With Allen, Tina Burner wrote Farmyard Follies. The show debuted in 2023 in Provincetown at the Crown & Anchor and was filmed for a forthcoming documentary feature. The show had been in development for three years before its debut.

On April 23, 2025, Tina Burner was announced as one of eighteen former Drag Race contestants participating in the tenth season of RuPaul's Drag Race All Stars.

== Personal life ==
Seeber was previously in a 3-4 year relationship with Irish television host Graham Norton; the two had met at Barracuda Lounge in New York City. Seeber moved to the United Kingdom to be with Norton, until their separation in 2006. He has a dog, Lady. Seeber has been diagnosed with autism and ADHD.

== Discography ==
Title	Year	Notes	Awards	Chart information
"I'd Rather Be Naughty Than Nice"	2022	Feat. Blake Allen		
Mix Queen: A Relationship Mixtape	2022	Feat. Blake Allen		#1 ITunes Comedy Chart
Maybe This Time	2021	Feat. Blake Allen	Nomination MAC Awards Best Album	#2 ITunes Vocal Chart
"What I Did for Love"	2021	Feat. Blake Allen		
"Proud of Your Boy"	2021	Feat. Blake Allen		
"ConDragulations (Cast Version)"	2021	By RuPaul featuring the Cast of RuPaul's Drag Race, Season 13		
"If You See Something Slay Something"	2021			

== Filmography ==
=== Television ===
Year	Title	Role	Notes	Ref
2017	Shade: Queens of NYC	Main cast		
2021	RuPaul's Drag Race	Contestant	Season 13; 7th place	
2021	RuPaul's Drag Race: Untucked	Contestant	Season 13	
2021	RuPaul's Drag Race: Corona Can't Keep a Good Queen Down	Himself	Stand-alone special	
2023	Watch What Happens Live with Andy Cohen	Herself	Guest	
2025	RuPaul's Drag Race: All Stars	Contestant	Season 10; 11th/18th Place	

=== Web series ===
Year	Title	Role	Notes	Ref
2021	Ruvealing the Look	Herself	Guest	
2021	Whatcha Packin'	Herself	Guest	
2021	The X Change Rate	Herself	Guest	

== See also ==
- LGBT culture in New York City
- List of LGBT people from New York City
