= Putwiński =

Putwiński is a Polish noble family name belonging to Abdank coat of arms. Russian-language spelling: Путвинский may be transliterated as Putvinsky or Putvinski; in the former Soviet Union it was transliterated in French-language style as Poutvinski. Lithuanian-language forms are Putvinskis and Putvinskas.

Notable people with the surname include:

- Vladas Putvinskis, birth name Władysław Gerard Putwiński (1973–1929), Lithuanian paramilitary leader, one of the founders of the Lithuanian Riflemen's Union, a politician, social activist, and author
- Nicolas Putvinski Russian American fashion designer
