= Doris Dear =

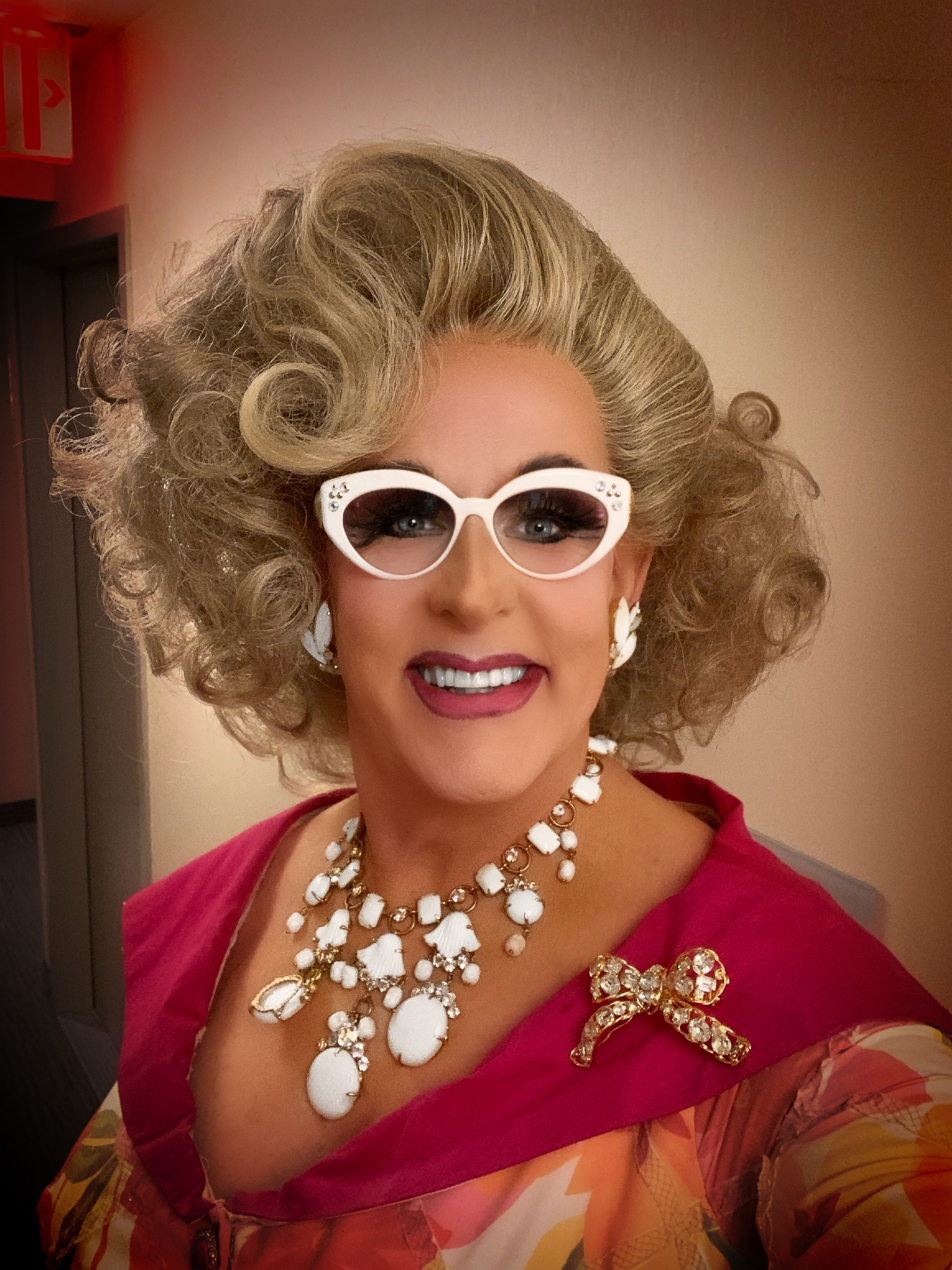
- Born: Ray DeForest; New York
- Other name: Perfect American Housewife
- Occupations: Actor, cabaret singer, comedian

Doris Dear is a fictional female actor, cabaret singer and comedian created and played by Ray DeForest.

== Overview ==
Doris Dear, also known as “Perfect American Housewife”, is based on DeForest's mother, Taffy. The stories are based on the life of Doris and her mother. When Taffy (Doris Dear's mother) was diagnosed with Alzheimer's disease, she decided to write a show and share her stories of growing up with Taffy, Duke and her sister Nancy in Staten Island. It was her way of sharing and honoring the people who gave her life, love and soul.

A Doris Dear illustration was created by artist Tess Fowler.

== Education and careers ==
She studied in University of Maryland and after college, she worked for the Disney Productions as a “Kid of the Kingdom”. After staying in Disney for 5 years, she moved to Denmark where she wrote, produced and performed.

She later travelled to Paris to model, London to sing, and Vegas to perform. She then started hosting her own shows on Food Network, HGTV, Lifetime, and a syndicated TV design show.

She did her own one-woman show, Doris Dear Girl Talk in residence at “Don’t Tell Mama”.

Doris Dear premiered her new lifestyle talk show on Broadway on Demand a new streaming service on Nov 6, 2020, entitled "Doris Dear's Gurl Talk". The theme song for Doris Dear's Gurl Talk was written by Blake Allen. The second season is in post production, with a projected premiere in late Spring 2021.

The Doris Dear Christmas Special premiered for one-night only on Broadway on Demand in December 2020, and received a 5-star rating from NYC.com. The show featured Karen Mason, Amra-Faye Wright, Benny Benack III, Sean Harkness, Lina Koutrakos, Lisa Yaeger, Kristina Nicole Miller, and was directed by Koutrakos and music directed by Blake Allen.

The Doris Dear Christmas Special 2023 "Christmas Through the Ages" premiered on Dec 16th for a 2 night sold out star studded run at the Triad Theater off-broadway in NYC. It exclusively streamed on BroadwayonDemand streaming services for the last 2 weeks of December 2023

Doris Dear has raised money for The Alzheimers Association through sales of her custom designed pins that she sells at her live off-Broadway shows

Doris Dear appeared at the Provincetown Cabaret Festival in the summer of 2023, a performance which received a positive review.

Doris Dear is celebrating 10 years of performances after she created her character because her mother was dying of Alzheimers. The show is an all night celebration with over a dozen guests from all walk of life in the entertainment business. Featuring stars like Sandy Duncan, Don Correia, Leslie Carrara-Rudolph, Meg Flather, Those Girls, The daSilva boys and more.

== Popular Shows ==
- “Like Mother, Like Daughter: A Mother’s Day Special” at Feinstein's/54 Below.
- A Doris Dear Christmas Special was played at the Triad Theatre.
- Doris Dear's Gurl Talk at Feinstein's/54 Below.
- A Doris Dear Christmas Special at Feinstein's/54 Below.
- Doris Dear's Gurl Talk on Broadway on Demand
- The Doris Dear Christmas Special pay-per-view on Broadway on Demand
- Doris Dear's Gurl Talk Season 2 on Broadway on Demand
- Doris Dear's Christmas Special 'Christmas Through the Ages'

== Awards and nominations ==
| Year | Award | Category | Show | Result |
|---|---|---|---|---|
| 2016 | MAC Awards | Best Drag Artist or Impersonator | | Won |
| 2017 | GLAM Awards | Best Cabaret Show | Doris Dear Mother's Day Special | Nominated |
| 2018 | BroadwayWorld Cabaret Awards | Best Drag Artist or Impersonator | | Nominated |
| 2019 | MAC Awards | Best Drag Artist or Impersonator | | Won |
| 2020 | MAC Awards | Best Drag Artist or Impersonator | | Won |
| 2021 | BroadwayWorld Cabaret Awards | Best Musical Comedy Cabaret | The Doris Dear Christmas Special | Nominated |
| 2021 | BroadwayWorld Cabaret Awards | Best Vocalist | An Evening With Frank Sinatra | Nominated |
| 2021 | BroadwayWorld Cabaret Awards | Best Show Art | The Doris Dear Christmas Special | Won |
