= Rise Bar =

Gay bar in Manhattan, New York City

- Logo

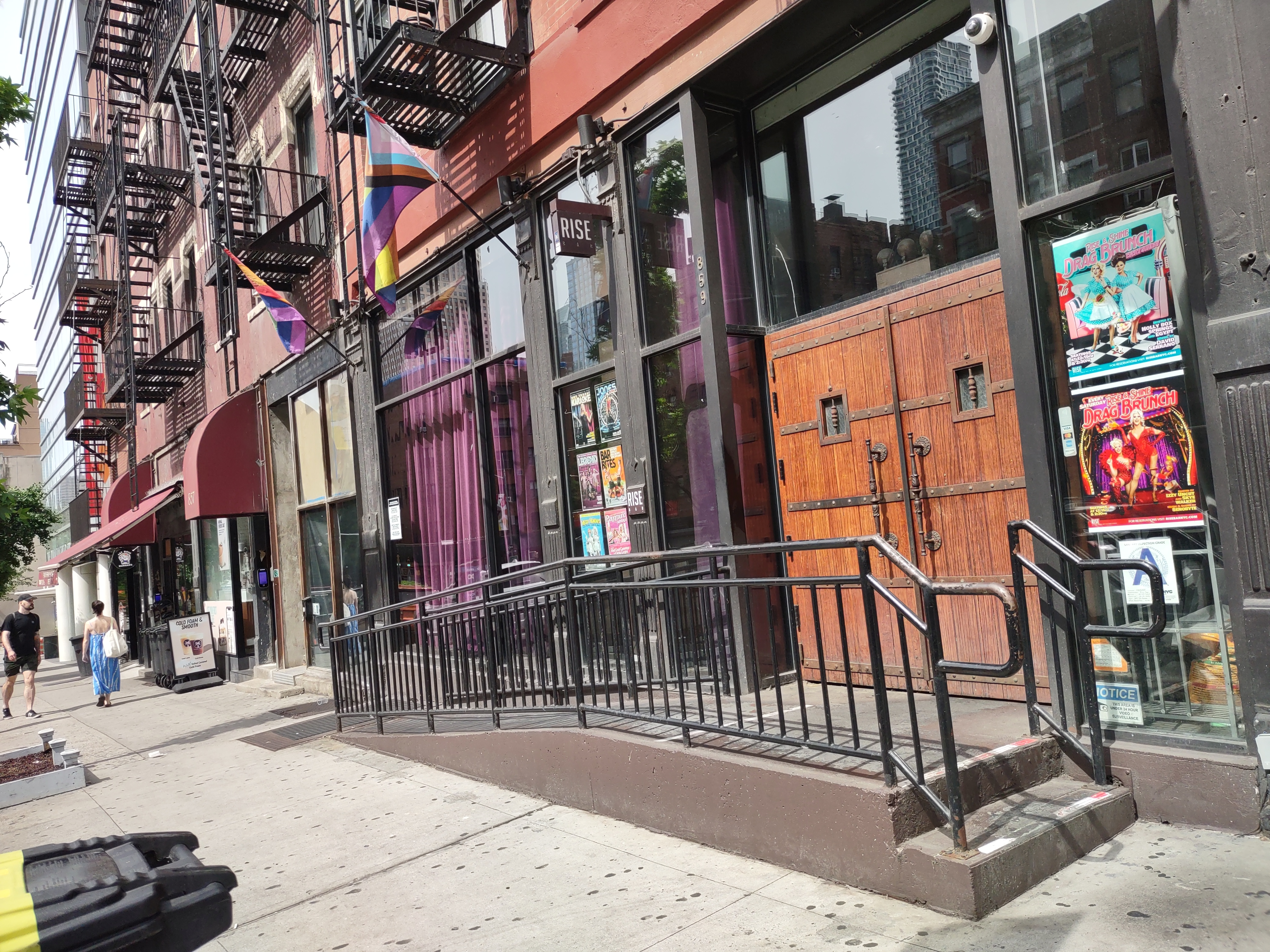
- The bar's exterior in 2024
- Interactive map of Rise Bar
- Address: 859 Ninth Avenue
- Location: Hell's Kitchen, Manhattan, New York City
- Coordinates: 40.7672°N 73.9866°W
- Owner: Ted Arenas; John Blair; Beto Sutter
- Type: Gay bar
- Public transit: 57th Street station; 59th Street–Columbus Circle station

Construction
- Opened: November 2015

Website
- risebarnyc.com

Rise Bar, or simply Rise, is a gay bar in the Hell's Kitchen neighborhood of Manhattan in New York City. Opened in 2015, it is a small establishment surrounded by a number of larger LGBTQ nightlife venues. The bar is most popular among gay men and some women. It features pop music and hosts weekly entertainment including drag shows, open-mic nights and karaoke. Though Rise's owners invested in soundproofing before it opened, noise concerns from nearby residents initially led the local community board and state liquor authority to require the venue to close at an earlier hour than its competitors. Following a contentious series of applications to modify Rise's operating schedule and liquor license, this requirement was overturned for weekend nights. The establishment has received praise for its welcoming, diverse atmosphere.

== Description ==
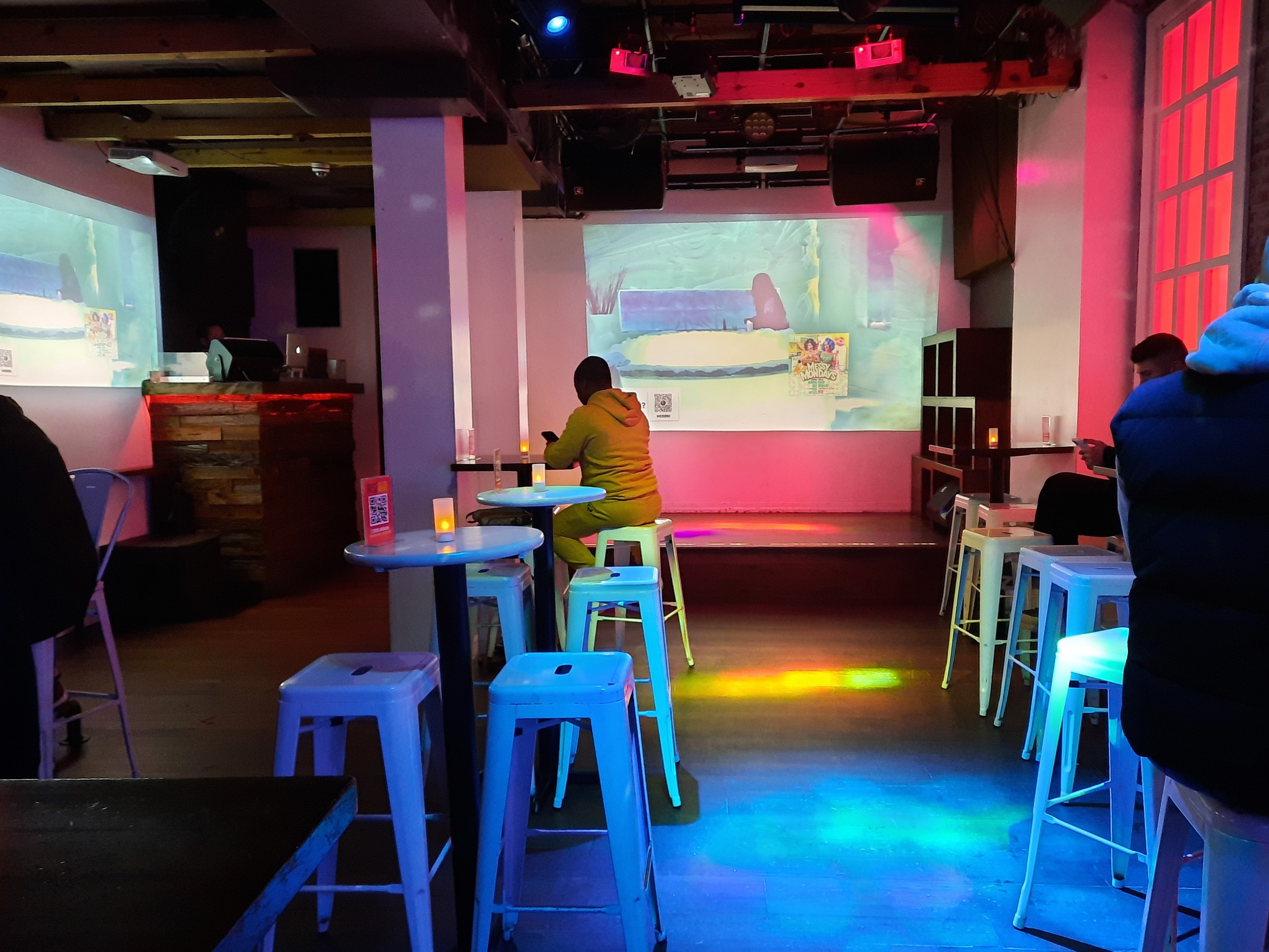
Interior of Rise Bar, 2021

Rise Bar is located in Hell's Kitchen, Manhattan, a few blocks north of the neighborhood's other gay venues, including Industry Bar and Flaming Saddles Saloon. Its exterior is characterized by heavy wooden doors with large handles. The interior, described by Gothamist as "sleek" and "open", has a white bar, black tables, a glitter ball, a stage and television screens playing music videos. A 2015 New York Times article categorized most of the clientele as gay men in their 30s and 40s, noting that female customers also frequent the bar early in the night. A 2016 Gothamist piece classed one Saturday night crowd as "young, hot twenty-somethings".

The establishment's daily happy hour runs from 4 p.m. to 9 p.m. and features half-price drinks. Its ambient music consists predominantly of pop and top 40 artists, with Wednesday playlists being rock-themed. According to ShermansTravel, the scene inside "turns into a thumping dance party most nights". The venue regularly hosts nighttime drag shows, karaoke, open-mic nights, Broadway-themed events and weekend drag brunches. Prior to her 2017 appearance on Drag Race, Peppermint hosted one of the bar's weekly shows. In September 2019, Luxembourg Prime Minister Xavier Bettel and his husband, Gauthier Destenay, visited Rise to attend a drag performance by Marti Gould Cummings.

== History ==
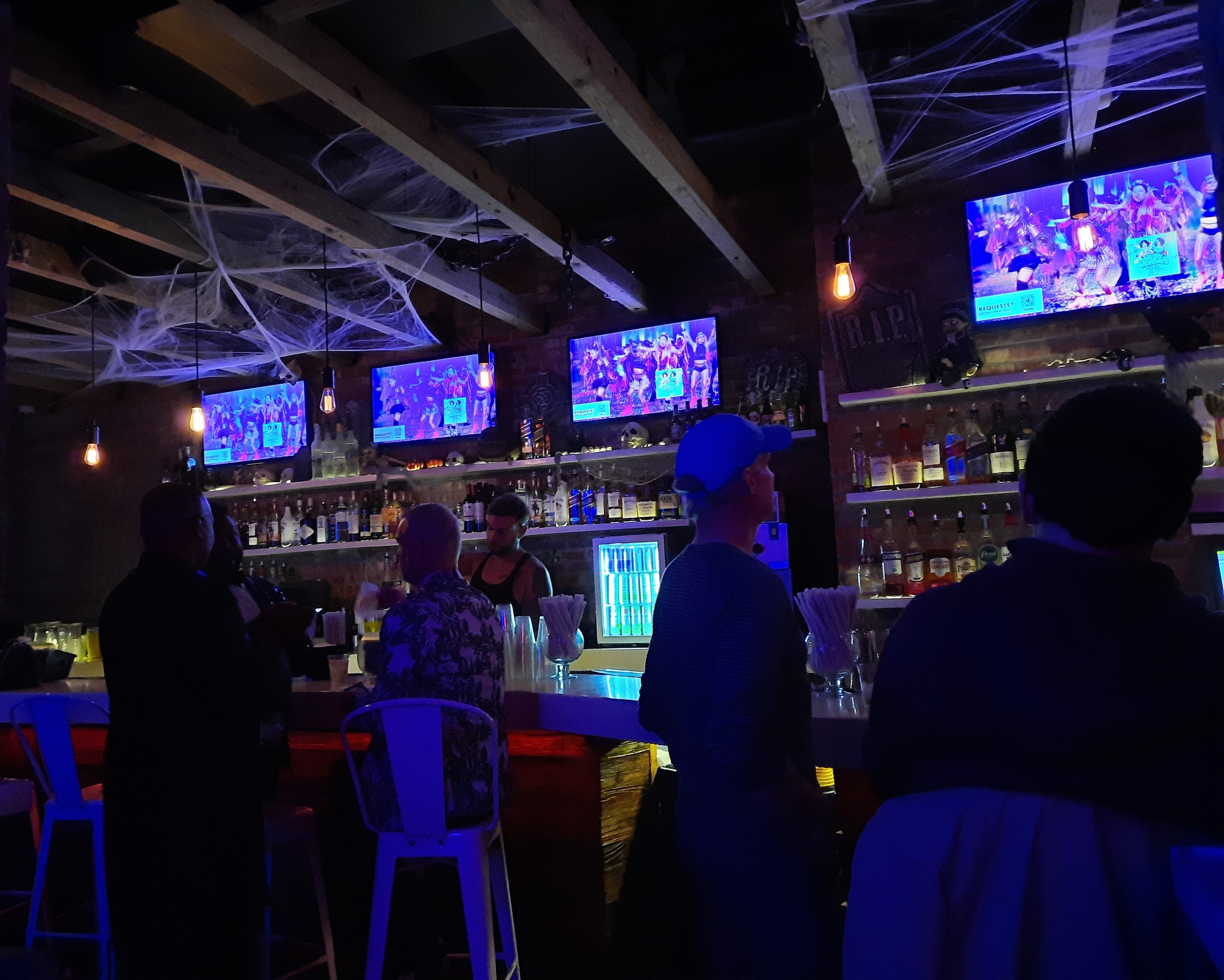
The bar area

Ted Arenas, John Blair and Beto Sutter opened Rise Bar in November 2015. Because noise was an ongoing concern for residents of the nightlife-saturated neighborhood, the trio invested heavily in soundproofing infrastructure ahead of the venue's debut. A 2014 DNAinfo article quoted Blair saying that the owners spent $70,000 to make sure their neighbors would have "a good quality of life". The publication later reported that the bar's landlord spent $90,000 on "soundproofing throughout the building" and that Blair spent about $20,000 "hiring a sound engineer to install paneling and conduct sound checks". Nevertheless, Manhattan Community Board 4 narrowly approved the bar's liquor license, and the state liquor authority (SLA) greenlit the application only on the condition that the venue close daily by 2 a.m. for its first year of operation.

In late 2016, Blair—a former member of the community board—filed to change Rise's closing time to 4 a.m. on Thursdays, Fridays and Saturdays. He argued that the bar was unable to compete with other LGBTQ venues nearby—including Industry, Therapy, Fairytail Lounge and Hardware—because they were all allowed to operate until 4 a.m. He presented letters of support from more than 800 people—including 21 living above the bar—and from Manhattan Borough President Gale Brewer, Councilman Corey Johnson and Senator Brad Hoylman. Approximately a dozen residents attended board meetings in person to speak in favor of Rise, which some described as a "haven" for the local gay community.

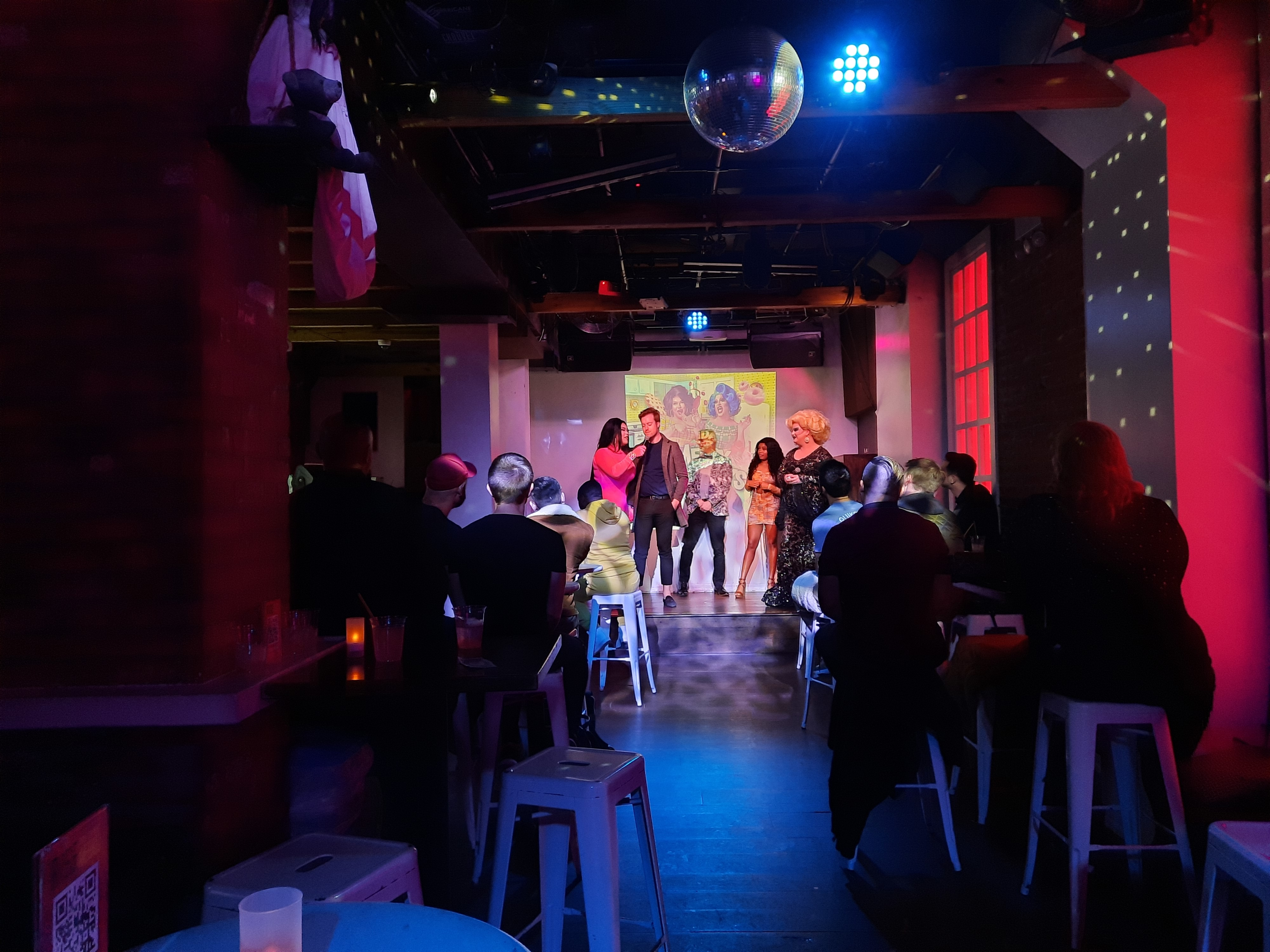
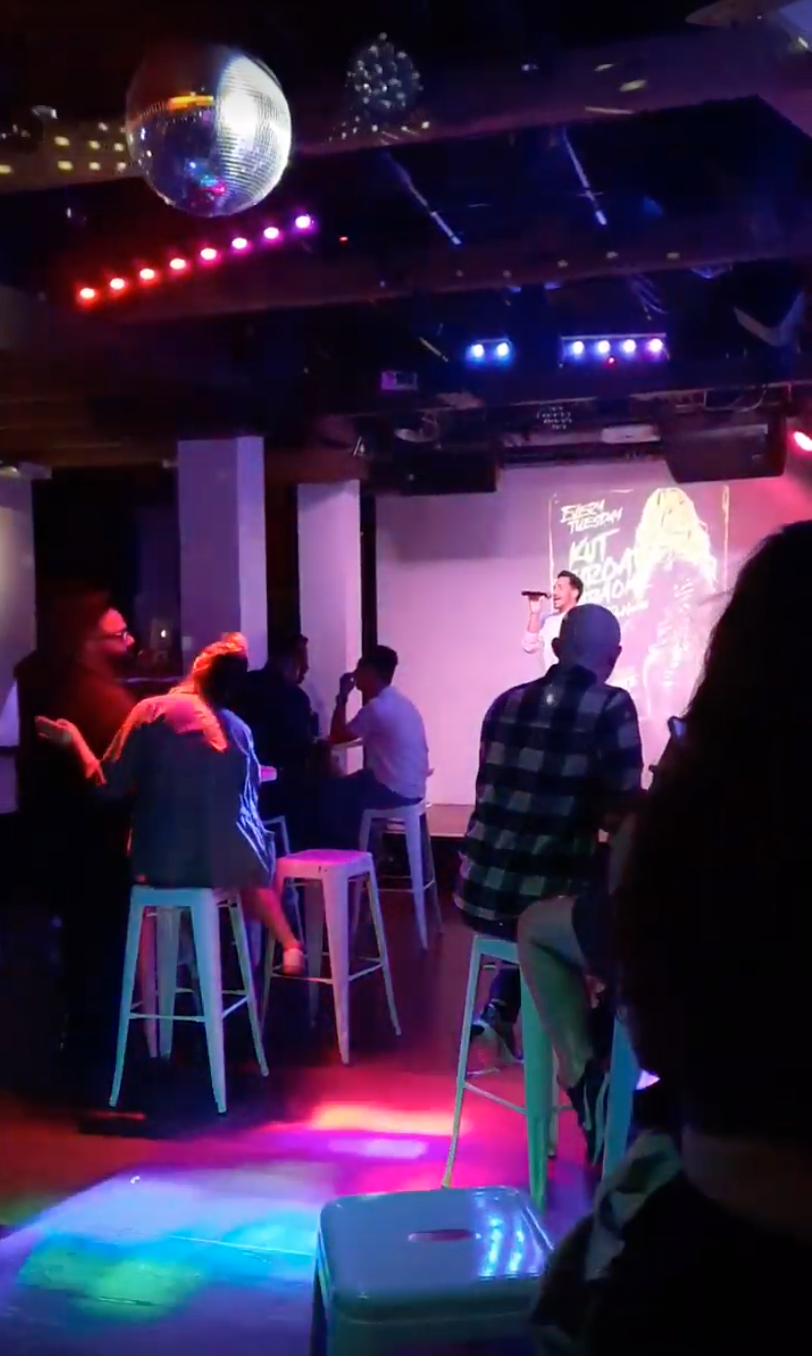
Drag show (top) and karaoke (bottom) at Rise Bar in 2021, with the venue's glitter ball visible in both images

Opponents of the change voiced concerns about "noise, late-night crowds and unruly patrons". Others said that when the owners first applied for the establishment's liquor license, they had misrepresented it as a lounge without live entertainment, and its drag shows and karaoke nights meant that it was, in practice, operating as a nightclub. Some residents of apartments above the bar stated that noise disrupted their sleep. Altogether, the board directly received 66 letters of opposition to the 4 a.m. closing time and 16 e-mails in favor of it. The co-chairman of the 50–51 Block Association objected to the letters of support penned by Brewer, Johnson and Hoylman, stating that they were written without constituent input. However, no "specific problematic instances", such as noise violations or incidents of unruly behavior, were submitted to the board's Business Licenses and Permits committee, which issued preliminary approval to Blair's application. The full board subsequently voted 20–18 to extend the bar's hours, and it issued a request that the SLA "consider asking the operators to ... modify their method of operation, in light of the [live entertainment they host]".

The bar then applied to change its liquor license to include a provision for live piano music, which again provoked opposition from neighbors who felt the owners had not been upfront about their intentions for the space. Rise's lawyer refuted this, asserting that plans for drag shows and karaoke had been disclosed from the beginning and that karaoke should not be classified as live music since no instruments are played on site. The Business Licenses and Permits committee ultimately approved the proposal, "provided the bar wrap up any and all live performances before 1 a.m. and conduct sound tests in the apartments of residents with complaints". The venue presented a compromise by amending its request to the SLA, soliciting a 4 a.m. closing time only on Fridays and Saturdays; it volunteered to keep its 2 a.m. Thursday curfew. A few weeks later, in January 2017, the board voted 24–10 in favor of the license modification.

During the COVID-19 pandemic, the business next door to Rise shut down. Rise's owners took over the lease for that space and doubled the venue's size, adding a second bar and dance floor. They also launched a food menu.

In May 2026, the bar hosted a Zara Larsson-themed night in partnership with Paper magazine. Larsson made a surprise appearance at the event.

== Reception ==
Gothamist included Rise Bar on its 2016 list of "the 12 best gay bars in NYC". Michael Musto described it as "a warm hangout that is unpretentious yet polished", further stating that its high volume of female customers "[makes] for shocking diversity". During the bar's application process for later operating hours, patrons who attended board meetings commented that Rise was a comfortable place that "fostered a sense of community". ShermansTravel lists the establishment among "the best gay and queer bars in Manhattan". Get Out! Magazine named Rise its Best Bar of the Year in 2022.

== See also ==
- LGBTQ culture in New York City
