= Karen Mason =

American actress and singer (born 1951)

- Born: March 31, 1951 (age 75); New Orleans, Louisiana
- Occupations: Actress; singer
- Spouse: Paul Rolnick
- Website: www.karenmason.com

Karen Mason is an American musical theatre actress and singer. She has appeared on stage in Broadway theatre, notably as Norma Desmond in Sunset Boulevard, and is a cabaret performer.

== Career ==
Mason was born in New Orleans, Louisiana, and grew up in St. Louis and Chicago. She majored in theater at the University of Illinois at Chicago Circle, graduating in 1999. Mason started as a "singing hostess at Lawrence of Oregano in Chicago" in 1976 after leaving college, where she met the late pianist and composer Brian Lasser, with whom she worked until his death in 1992.

Mason has performed in cabaret and with symphonies for many years. She was one of the featured cabaret vocalists at Duplex Cabaret Theatre, New York City, in the early 1980s, and in 2005 presented a program "Better Days" with songs by her late musical director Brian Lasser. She appeared at the Bay Area Cabaret, Empire Ballroom, San Francisco in 2010. She continues to perform her cabaret act at such venues as Davenport's (Chicago) and The Iridium (New York City). She taught at the Theatre Arts Center's Summer Workshops & Camp in Bayside, Queens, New York in 2010.

She first appeared on Broadway in Play Me a Country Song in 1982. She took the role of standby to Glenn Close as Norma Desmond in Sunset Boulevard in the Los Angeles production in 1993, and went on to play almost 300 performances over two years both in Los Angeles and on Broadway. She originated the role of Tanya in Mamma Mia!, playing the role from October 5, 2001 to October 6, 2002. She took over the role of Velma Von Tussle in Hairspray on April 6, 2008. She was the Queen of Hearts in Wonderland in 2011 on Broadway and in the Tampa and Houston productions in 2009–2010. Mason appears in the US tour of A Christmas Story, The Musical! starting in November 2011.

In 2011, Mason was scheduled to play Mrs. Danvers in the musical Rebecca on Broadway. In 2017, she sang, "It's About Time", written by her husband, Paul Rolnick (in 2011), to call for marriage equality. Mason appeared on tour in Andrew Lloyd Webber's Love Never Dies as Madame Giry. The tour ended on December 2, 2018. In December 2020, Mason appeared in The Doris Dear Christmas Special on Broadway on Demand, where her performance received a 5-star rating.

=== Work ===
Broadway

- Play Me a Country Song (1982)
- Jerome Robbins' Broadway (1989)
- Sunset Boulevard (1994)
- Mamma Mia! (Drama Desk Award nomination) (2001)
- Hairspray (2008)
- Wonderland (2011)

Off Broadway

- Karen Mason Sings Broadway, Beatles, and Brian, 1986, Minetta Lane Theater
- And the World Goes 'Round (Outer Critics Circle Award) – 1991
- Carnival! – Rosalie, 1993, York Theatre

Regional

- Heartbeats by Amanda McBroom at Goodspeed Opera House, 1993
- Gypsy at the Westchester Broadway Theatre in May through August 2007; The Muny in St. Louis, Missouri in July 2006;Bucks County Playhouse in New Hope, Pennsylvania; and the Sundance Theatre

Touring Production

- Love Never Dies (2017–2018 US National Tour)

Recording

Mason has recorded 6 solo albums, including Right Here, Right Now. She appears on the cast recordings of And the World Goes 'Round and Wonderland.

== Personal life ==
Mason is married to Paul Rolnick, a producer and composer.

== Awards ==
Mason has received 10 MAC Awards, including the 2004 MAC Award for Major Female Vocalist, and three Bistro Awards.
