= Marti Gould Cummings =

American drag queen and activist

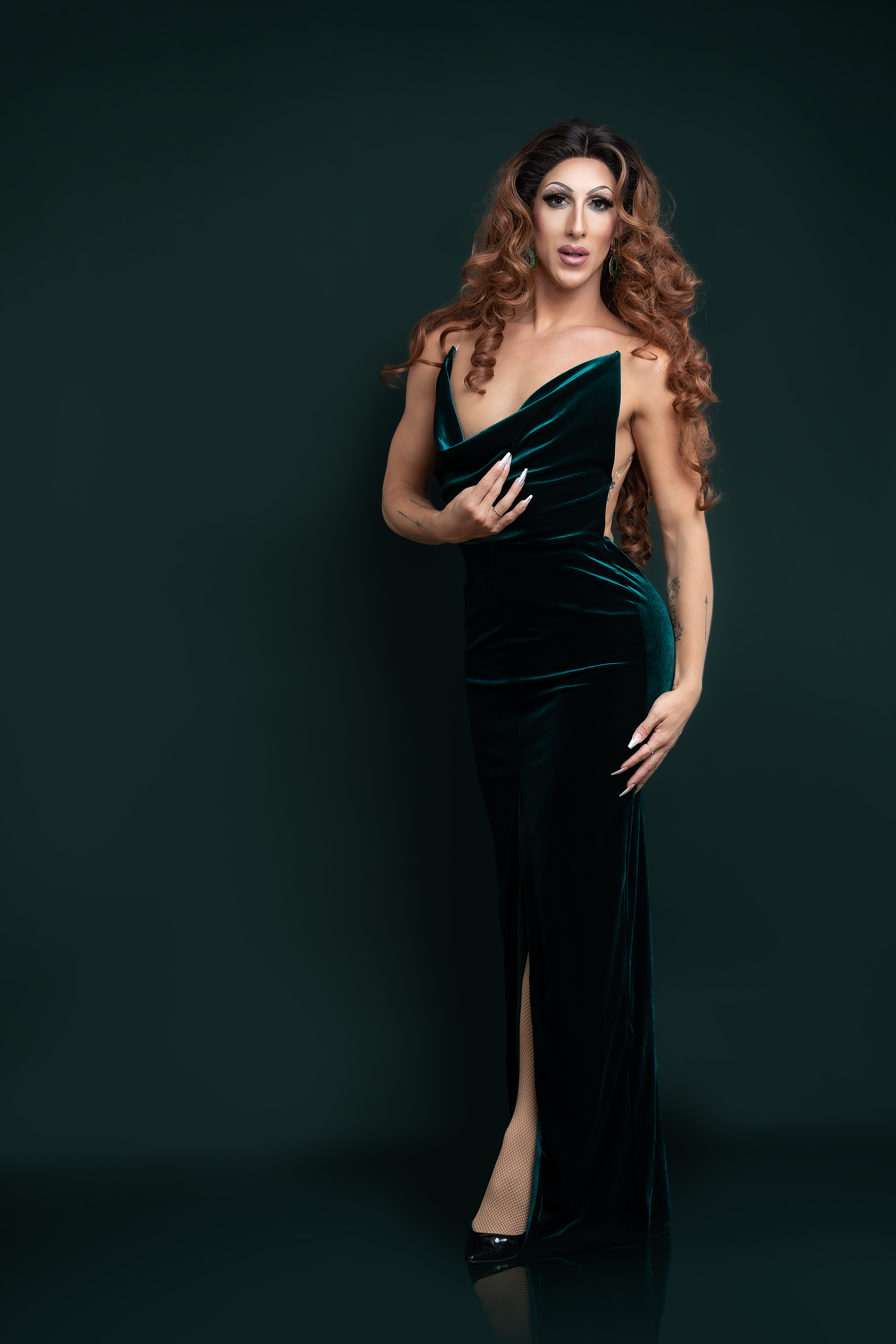
- Cummings in 2024
- Born: Maryland, U.S.
- Occupations: drag queen activist television personality
- Political party: Democratic
- Spouse: Blake Allen (m. 2016–2022)
- Partner: John Robbie (fiancé)
- Website: marticummings.com

Marti Gould Cummings is an American drag queen, activist, and television personality. They (Note: Cummings is non-binary and uses they/them pronouns.) competed on Drag Me to Dinner and the twenty-third season of Worst Cooks in America. They were a cast member of the 2017 reality television series Shade: Queens of NYC and, since 2020, host of The Marti Report on Logo TV. Cummings unsuccessfully ran in the 2021 New York City Council election, becoming the first openly non-binary candidate to run for public office in New York City. In May 2025, they set a Guinness World Record by becoming the first drag queen to perform on all seven continents. Cummings served as a Grand Marshall of NYC Pride 2025.

== Career ==
Cummings started the political organizing group Hell's Kitchen Democrats in Hell's Kitchen, Manhattan. In 2021, they became the first openly non-binary candidate to run for office in New York City when they ran for the District 7 seat on the New York City Council, which includes Manhattan Valley, Morningside Heights, Manhattanville and Hamilton Heights. Their campaign was featured in the documentary Queen of New York. Cummings serves on the New York Democratic State Committee. Cummings is the first drag queen to moderate a panel at the United Nations.

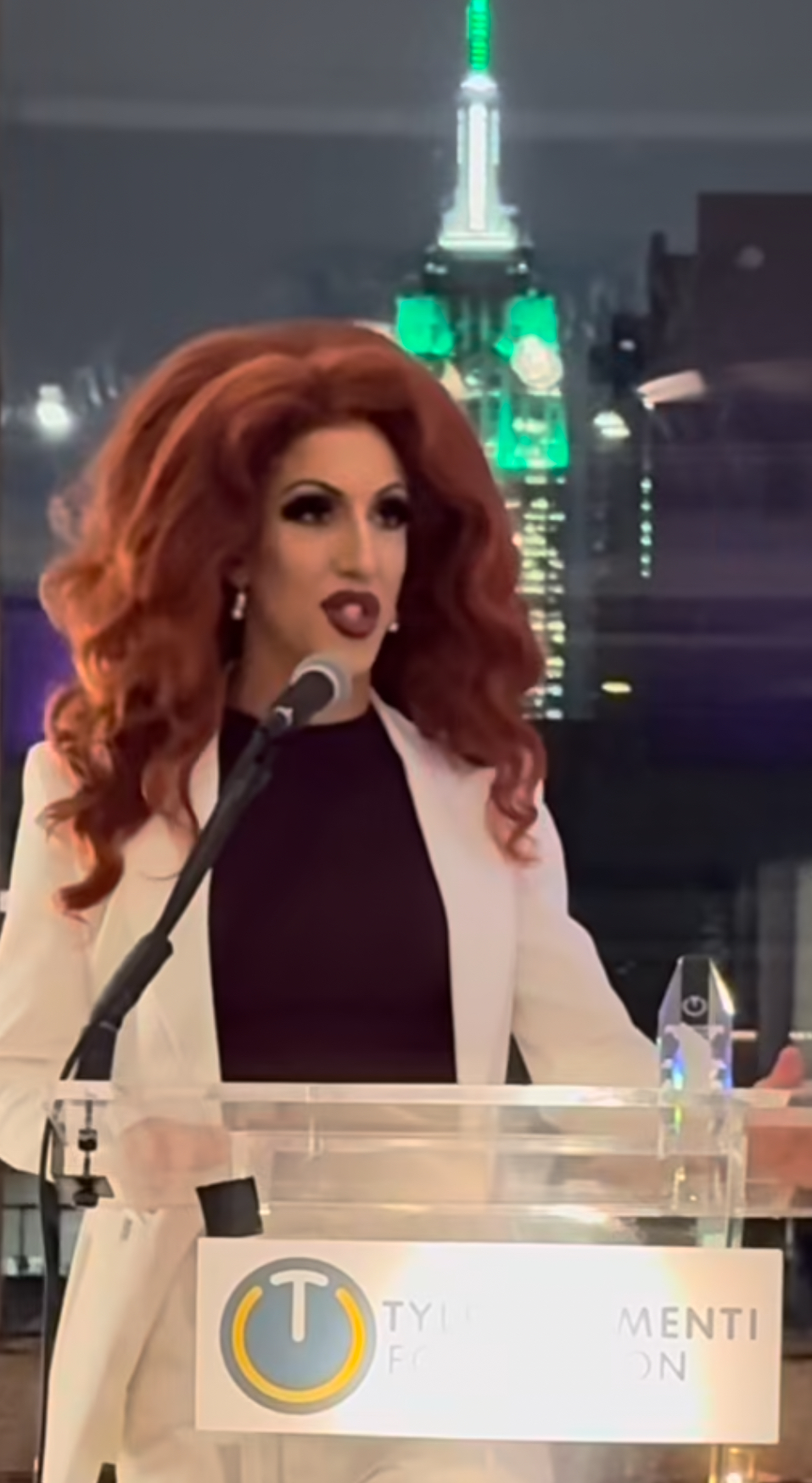
Cummings speaking at the Tyler Clementi Foundation's 11th Annual Upstander Legacy Celebration in 2025.

They have worked with the Ali Forney Center, the Tyler Clementi Foundation, Broadway Cares/Equity Fights AIDS, and the Hetrick-Martin Institute to support LGBTQ youth. On October 23, 2025, Cummings and Wilson Cruz received the Upstander Award from the Tyler Clementi Foundation during their 11th annual Upstander Legacy Celebration in New York.

As a drag queen in New York City, Cummings has performed at Pieces Bar, Hardware Bar, Therapy NYC, Rise Bar, the Stonewall Inn, The West End, Boxers NYC Washington Heights, and Talde Jersey City. They also host a monthly drag brunch at 54 Below and perform Stage Fright, a weekly live theatre talk show, at the Red Eye. They host the talk show The Marti Report on LogoTV. In May 2025, Cummings set a Guinness World Record by becoming the first drag queen to perform on all seven continents.

Cummings speaking at the Gays Against Guns Rally for El Paso & Dayton in 2019.

Cummings has been featured on the Out100 list and in Vogue. In 2025, they were appointed as one of the Grand Marshalls of NYC Pride. They used their platform as Grand Marshall to condemn United States Immigration and Customs Enforcement raids, genocide, and violence and oppression of transgender people and immigrants.

== Personal life ==
Cummings grew up in Maryland. They moved to New York City in 2005, when they were seventeen years old.

They married the musician and composer Blake Allen in 2016. They divorced in 2022. In 2025, Cummings became engaged to John Robbie.

== Filmography ==
Marti Gould Cummings filmography
| Year | Title | Role | Notes |
|---|---|---|---|
| 2010 | Jeffery & Cole Casserole | Actor | 1 episode |
| 2013 | Conversations w/My Ex | Themself | 1 episode |
| 2016 | Sign | Drag Queen | Short film |
| 2017 | Shade: Queens of NYC | Themself | Main cast member |
| 2020 | Digital Drag Fest | Themself | Digital concert series |
| 2020 | Jan & Friends: Rise Up | Actor | Music video |
| 2020–present | The Marti Report | Themself | Host |
| 2022 | Worst Cooks in America | Themself | Season 23 |
| 2023 | Drag Me to Dinner | Themself | Episode 3 |
