= Boxers NYC Washington Heights =

Gay nightclub in New York City

- Logo
- Interactive map of Boxers NYC Washington Heights
- Address: 3820 Broadway
- Location: Washington Heights, Manhattan, New York, US
- Coordinates: 40.8353°N 73.9436°W
- Owner: Bob Fluet; Rob Hynds
- Type: Gay bar; sports bar
- Public transit: 157th Street station; 163rd Street–Amsterdam Avenue station

Construction
- Opened: September 14, 2018
- Closed: September 29, 2020

Website
- boxersnyc.com/wahi

Boxers NYC Washington Heights, also known simply as Boxers Washington Heights or Boxers WaHi, was a gay sports bar in the Washington Heights neighborhood of Manhattan in New York City. It was the fifth establishment opened by the Boxers NYC nightlife brand. The bar featured weekly events such as Latin nights, karaoke parties, urban nights, open mic events, drag shows, and screenings of NFL games and RuPaul's Drag Race. Its September 2018 debut was met with concern that it would contribute to gentrification of the area, but its approval was straightforward. The venue proved to be popular and received praise for its comfortable, welcoming atmosphere. Boxers Washington Heights announced its closure on September 29, 2020, citing difficulties caused by the COVID-19 pandemic.

== Description ==
Like other Boxers NYC venues, Boxers Washington Heights was a gay sports bar that featured male bartenders in red boxer shorts and female bartenders in athletic tops and red shorts. In addition to alcohol, it served a selection of bar food. It also hosted a number of weekly events, including National Football League (NFL) game screenings, Latin nights, RuPaul's Drag Race viewing parties, karaoke, urban nights, open mic events, and drag shows starring artists like Marti Gould Cummings.

== History ==
Bob Fluet and Rob Hynds founded the Boxers NYC chain in 2010, when they opened the brand's flagship venue in Chelsea, Manhattan. Throughout the 2010s, the business expanded within New York City, including into Hell's Kitchen and the Upper East Side, as well as into Center City, Philadelphia. In March 2018, the chain was approved for a 15-year lease on a new location in Washington Heights; it opened on September 14, 2018. At that time, Boxers WaHi was the only gay bar in that neighborhood, which had been without such a venue since 2014. Fluet and Hynds selected Washington Heights because the area was "increasingly popular among New York City's millennial and LGBTQ residents, [but it was not] yet known for businesses that service these groups".

A September 2018 article in Instinct magazine questioned whether the bar's arrival would contribute to gentrification and displacement of the local Dominican community. Hynds stated that Boxers WaHi would be welcoming to all demographics, that it had hired a diverse staff, and that it would feature events appealing to different audiences. Some locals expressed concern that Boxers WaHi's presence would make the area more attractive to businesses and drive up the cost of rent. The local community board nevertheless approved the bar's application without much opposition, and the venue's soft opening on September 10, 2018, attracted a crowd of hundreds.

Hynds and a number of local drag queens noted that because New York City no longer had a single, centralized gay scene, it was possible that Washington Heights would soon become a hotspot for that community. Monét X Change, a resident of the Bronx nearby, stated: "There are new gay bars being built up in Washington Heights and Harlem. So, I feel like soon [the gay scene is] going to transition to the Upper West Side and Harlem."

Like other New York nightlife venues, Boxers WaHi was ordered to shutter in early 2020 due to the COVID-19 pandemic. In May, it briefly operated as a food pantry for needy New Yorkers, and it reopened for outdoor dining and takeout in July. Fluet attempted to renegotiate the bar's lease to mitigate the financial strain caused by the pandemic, but he was unable to do so. On September 29, 2020, the bar's management announced that it had closed permanently.

== Reception ==
The Boxers NYC franchise has been referred to as "the gay Hooters". Richard Morgan of New York Times wrote, "[A]mid a gay renaissance of broader, nonconforming sensibilities—queer, transgender and woke—Boxers has bet on old-school, meat-market machismo.... Boxers' core appeal is its bartenders. The formula for their allure cuts a cunning line between candid and crude. They are about as explicitly erotic as a cover of Men's Fitness." Promoter Daniel Nardicio, who co-owns the cabaret-style East Village gay bar Club Cumming, said of Boxers: "They're not bland, but they're basic. They're kind of gay Hooters, but really they're gay TGI Fridays. And let me say, before the pitchforks come for me, we need that. We need a comfortable space. We are entitled to everything straight people have, including our own vanilla."

Of the Washington Heights location in particular, Ryan Shea of Instinct said: "I refer to Boxers WaHi as sophisticated meets sexy. There's a sprawling bar the minute you get inside with several gorgeous (and shirtless) hunks taking your drink order. The atmosphere is also welcoming and fun to be in. You can play pool, watch the game with some friends or chill and enjoy a drink or two with your date for the evening. This may sound redundant, as other gay bars do this exact same thing, but the overall vibe inside Boxers WaHi is immensely chill, which sets it apart from all the others."

== See also ==
- Impact of the COVID-19 pandemic on the LGBT community
- LGBT culture in New York City
