= Something New (film) =

2006 film by Sanaa Hamri

- Theatrical release poster
- Directed by: Sanaa Hamri
- Written by: Kriss Turner
- Produced by: Stephanie Allain
- Starring: Sanaa Lathan; Simon Baker; Mike Epps; Donald Faison; Blair Underwood; Wendy Raquel Robinson; Alfre Woodard
- Cinematography: Shane Hurlbut
- Edited by: Melissa Kent
- Music by: Lisa Coleman; Wendy Melvoin; Tanisha Harper
- Distributed by: Focus Features
- Release date: February 3, 2006
- Running time: 99 minutes
- Country: United States
- Language: English
- Box office: $11.4 million

Something New is a 2006 American romantic comedy drama film directed by Sanaa Hamri. It stars Sanaa Lathan and Simon Baker, and focuses on interracial relationships, traditional African American family values, and social customs. Filmed in Los Angeles, it was released in the United States on February 3, 2006.

== Plot ==
Kenya, an African-American accountant, has built her life around discipline and ambition, leaving little room for romance. Her need for perfection is evident in all aspects of her life – from her newly purchased home's bland interior to her strict personal rules. On Valentine's Day, she wakes from a nightmare about her own disastrous wedding, but later joins her girlfriends for a night out where the group agree to embrace a new mantra – "Let go, let flow". Kenya accepts a blind date with landscape architect Brian at Starbucks through her friend Leah, and Kenya is surprised to discover Brian is actually white. A polite but awkward conversation ensues before she abruptly departs, but they later cross paths at a gathering hosted at Leah's parents' home where Brian has landscaped the grounds. Impressed by the quality of his work, Kenya hires him to transform her neglected garden. Over time, their professional relationship gradually deepens into friendship and, ultimately, romance.

While Brian encourages Kenya to feel more at ease in both her home and within herself, she struggles with the opinions of her close friends, her affluent parents Joyce and Edmond, and her younger brother Nelson, which weigh heavily upon her. Tensions come to a head one evening while shopping at a grocery store when Brian resists discussing race matters, leading to a heated argument and the dissolution of their relationship. Nelson introduces Kenya to Mark, a tax attorney who has just relocated to Los Angeles. They begin to date, and while Joyce thoroughly approves, Edmond senses his daughter is not as happy as she was with Brian. When the dissonance she has developed finally overwhelms her, Kenya chooses to reunite with Brian, no longer allowing her controlling nature and social norms to dictate matters of the heart.

The film ends with Kenya marrying Brian amongst family and friends, with a wedding reception held in the garden Brian had landscaped several months prior.

== Cast ==
- Sanaa Lathan as Kenya McQueen
- Simon Baker as Brian Kelly, Kenya's landscape architect and later husband
- Mike Epps as Walter
- Donald Faison as Nelson McQueen, Kenya's younger brother
- Blair Underwood as Mark Harper
- Wendy Raquel Robinson as Cheryl, Kenya's friend and Walter's wife
- Alfre Woodard as Joyce McQueen, Kenya's mother
- Golden Brooks as Suzette, Kenya's friend
- Taraji P. Henson as Nedra, Kenya's friend
- Earl Billings as Edmond McQueen, Kenya's father
- Stanley DeSantis as Jack Pino
- Henry Simmons as Kyle
- Katharine Towne as Leah Cahan
- Julie Mond as Penelope, Brian's Ex
- Lee Garlington as Mrs. Cahan
- Tanisha Harper as Stacy

== Critical reception ==
Something New received generally positive reviews from critics. On the review aggregator website Rotten Tomatoes, 60% of 108 critics' reviews are positive, with an average rating of 6/10. The website's consensus reads: "Something New tackles serious questions about race and interracial relationships with genuine appeal and an alluring romance that develops as naturally as the plot." Metacritic, which uses a weighted average, assigned the film a score of 64 out of 100, based on 28 critics, indicating "generally favorable" reviews.

Manohla Dargis of The New York Times called the film "a pleasantly diverting romance ... [in which] the chemistry between the leads is as unmistakable as the setup is contrived ... The lovely Ms. Lathan ... and the similarly attractive Mr. Baker ... don't just look good together; they feel right in sync. Their easy, sensual rapport partly owes something to the generally sure hand of the film's director, Sanaa Hamri, making a fine feature debut, and something else, something indefinable, to the delectable mysteries of two bodies in cinematic motion."

Roger Ebert of the Chicago Sun-Times rated the film 3½ out of four stars and commented, "I found myself unexpectedly moved." He continued, "By the end, Something New delivers all the usual pleasures of a love story, and something more. The movie respects its subject and characters, and is more complex about race than we could possibly expect. With this film and the completely different but also observant Queen Latifah comedy Last Holiday, black women are being paid a kind of attention they deserve but rarely get in the movies."

Kevin Crust of the Los Angeles Times called the film "superficial and formulaic but pleasant enough to entertain and qualifies as intelligent and sophisticated by the current standard of Hollywood comedy." He added, "The movie nicely captures the area around Baldwin Hills, is crisply written by Kriss Turner and portrays the upper-middle class black community seldom seen in mainstream TV and film. However, the characterizations, even the leads, rarely rise above archetypes. The film's lack of depth as it oversimplifies the complexities of racism keep it from being anything other than a lightweight date movie."

Ruthe Stein of the San Francisco Chronicle said, "The trouble with the movie is that it sometimes seems at odds with itself, vacillating between a realistic presentation of the obstacles black professional women face finding a suitable mate and another bit of Hollywood fluff where their skin color is glossed over."

Steve Persall of the St. Petersburg Times graded the film B and commented, "I like the way Something New presents facets of African-American life seldom seen in mainstream movies, such as the formality and brief funkiness of a debutante cotillion ball, the affluent sophistication making such events important. I like Hamri's approach to material that might be offensive from a solidly black or white perspective. It all makes the foundational sameness of the story easier to take. The basic story isn't new, but telling it this way is really something."

Brian Lowry of Variety observed, "Wispy at best, this romantic comedy from a first-time director and screenwriter feels as if whole chunks have been left on the cutting-room floor, with what remains mustering intermittent charm thanks to the attractiveness, if not chemistry, of Sanaa Lathan and Simon Baker ... Perhaps the best thing the movie has going for it, actually, is that despite the title, there's really nothing new here at all; rather, the beats are so familiar the audience can fill in the gaps themselves."

== Award and nominations ==
- NAACP Image Award for Outstanding Actress in a Motion Picture (Sanaa Lathan, nominee)
- NAACP Image Award for Best Director of a Feature Film or Television Movie (Sanaa Hamri, nominee)
- Black Reel Award for Best Screenplay (Kriss Turner, winner)
- Black Reel Award for Best Film (nominee)
- Black Reel Award for Best Actress (Sanaa Lathan, nominee)
- Black Reel Award for Best Director (Sanaa Hamri, nominee)
- Black Reel Award for Best Original Score (nominee)
- Black Reel Award for Best Original Soundtrack (nominee)
- Black Movie Award for Outstanding Achievement in Screenwriting (Kriss Turner, winner)
- Black Movie Award for Outstanding Performance by an Actress in a Lead Role (Sanaa Lathan, nominee)
- Black Movie Award for Outstanding Performance by an Actress in a Supporting Role (Alfre Woodard, nominee)

== Home media release ==
On May 16, 2006, the film was released on DVD in Region 1 in two versions, one in anamorphic widescreen and the other in fullscreen format. Both have an English audio track and subtitles in English, Spanish, and French. Bonus features include an introduction by Blair Underwood, The Making of Something New, and The Dos and Don'ts of Dating.

== See also ==
- Guess Who (film)
