= Shade: Queens of NYC =

- Genre: Reality
- Country of origin: United States
- Original language: English
- No. of seasons: 1
- No. of episodes: 11

Production
- Executive producers: Liz Decesare; Mike Kelton; Rufus Lusk; Michael Melamedoff; Lisa Tucker
- Producers: Esther Bensadon; Corey Tatarczuk
- Production company: Cowboy Bear Ninja

Original release
- Network: Fusion TV
- Release: October 5 – December 21, 2017

Shade: Queens of NYC is a television series on the network Fusion TV. It premiered in October 2017.

== Cast ==
- Jesse Havea a.k.a. Brita Filter
- Marti Gould Cummings
- Justin Nako a.k.a. Chelsea Piers
- Nathan McManus a.k.a. Holly Box-Springs
- William Bailey a.k.a. Jada Valenciaga
- Chris Yoon a.k.a. Jasmine Rice LaBeija
- Daniel Kelley a.k.a. Paige Turner
- Kristian Seeber a.k.a. Tina Burner
- Blake Allen

== Episodes ==
No.	Title	Original release date	U.S. viewers (millions)
1	"It Takes a Village, Gurl"	October 5, 2017	N/A
2	"Werk, Queen!"	October 12, 2017	N/A
3	"Drag Queen Story Hour"	October 19, 2017	N/A
4	"A Tale of Two Queens"	October 26, 2017	N/A
5	"Drowning in Drag"	November 2, 2017	N/A
6	"So You Think You Can Drag"	November 9, 2017	N/A
7	"Dragonomics"	November 16, 2017	N/A
8	"It's Harder in Heels"	November 30, 2017	N/A
9	"Her Final Number"	December 7, 2017	N/A
10	"The Queens of I-95"	December 14, 2017	N/A
11	"Slay the Vote"	December 21, 2017	N/A

== Discography ==
A Very Marti Holiday, which features cast members Marti Gould Cummings, Tina Burner, and Jasmine Rice LaBeija, includes holiday classics sung by Daphne Rubin-Vega, Tony Award Winner Cady Huffman, Olivier Award Winner Lesli Margherita, Grammy Award Winner Tim Young, Jelani Remy, and Kristina Nicole Miller. The album features musical arrangements by cast member Blake Allen and raises money for Ali Forney Center.

== See also ==
- LGBTQ culture in New York City
