= Tanisha Harper =

Japanese-born American model

- Born: September 18, 1981 (age 45); Tokyo, Japan
- Occupations: Actress, model
- Years active: 2004–present

Tanisha Harper (born September 18, 1981) is an American model, actress and television host. She made her screen debut in the 2006 romantic comedy-drama film Something New and later starred in the MyNetworkTV series Desire. Harper was runner-up in the sixth season of the reality competition series Project Runway in 2009 and worked as a fashion model the following years. Harper returned to television playing Jordan Ashford in the ABC daytime soap opera, General Hospital (2022—present).

== Early life ==
Harper was born in Tokyo, Japan. At the age of 15 she was discovered in a shopping mall in her hometown of Phoenix, Arizona. At that time, she began her successful modeling career with the Ford Robert Black Agency. She is a graduate of Dobson High School and the University of Arizona.

== Career ==
=== Modeling ===
At the age of 15, Harper began working in print, runway, and commercial modeling and fashion jobs. She has done editorials for numerous magazines, including, Elle, Cosmopolitan, Vanity Fair, and In Style. She has appeared in adverts and catalogs for companies such as, L'Oréal, Smashbox, MAC Cosmetics, Ralph Lauren, Oscar de la Renta, and Tommy Hilfiger'.

She has appeared on both the Oprah Winfrey and Tyra Banks show, and was interviewed by Katie Couric on The Today Show. She also competed as a model during the sixth season of Project Runway, finishing in second place, behind eventual winner Irina Shabayeva's model Kalyn Hemphill. During the show, she was mostly paired with designer Althea Harper, who also finished second.

=== Acting ===
Harper made her first television appearance in 2005, playing Spectra Model in an episode of CBS daytime soap opera, The Bold and the Beautiful. She made another The Bold and the Beautiful in 2010, playing Jackie M. model in one episode. In 2006 she made her big screen debut playing the role of Stacey in the film romantic comedy-drama film Something New. Later that year, Harper starred as series regular on the MyNetworkTV prime time soap opera, Desire. In 2008 she had secondary role in the comedy film Forgetting Sarah Marshall. Harper guest-starred on Dear White People and Hacks.

In February 2022, Deadline Hollywood announced that Harper had been cast in the role of Jordan Ashford on the ABC soap opera, General Hospital replacing Briana Nicole Henry. she will make her first appearance in March.

== Filmography ==
| Year | Title | Role | Notes |
|---|---|---|---|
| 2005 | The Bold and the Beautiful | Spectra Model | 1 Episode |
| 2006 | Something New | Stacy | |
| 2006 | Desire | Heather | Series regular, 63 episodes |
| 2007 | Supreme Courtships | Co-star | Television pilot |
| 2008 | Forgetting Sarah Marshall | Model | |
| 2010 | Nick Swardson's Pretend Time | Wife | 2 Episodes |
| 2015 | Big Bang MADE Tour | T | Short film |
| 2011 | In the Flow with Affion Crockett | Model | |
| 2018 | Dear White People | Denise | Episode: "Volume 2: Chapter X" |
| 2021 | Coming to Hollywood | Edith | Episode: "The Party Monster Fundraiser" |
| 2021 | Hacks | Tatiana | Episode: "There Is No Line" |
| 2022 | Dollface | Gossip Girl #2 | Episode: "Travel Agent" |
| 2022—present | General Hospital | Jordan Ashford | Series regular |
