= Over Here! =

- Playbill for the Broadway production
- Music: Richard M. Sherman; Robert B. Sherman
- Lyrics: Robert B. Sherman; Richard M. Sherman
- Book: Will Holt
- Productions: 1974 Broadway

Over Here! is a musical with a score by Richard M. Sherman and Robert B. Sherman and book by Will Holt. The original Broadway production was directed by Tom Moore and choreographed by Patricia Birch, with scenic design by Douglas W. Schmidt and costumes by Carrie F. Robbins.

Over Here! was a follow-up to the Sherman brothers' World War II musical Victory Canteen, an off-Broadway production that featured 1940s icon Patty Andrews. The setting is a cross-country train trip in the United States during World War II (hence the name of the play, in contrast to the popular patriotic war anthem entitled Over There). The show begins as a nostalgic look at 1940s America (where fashion, music, big bands and swing dance dominates) but, quickly evolves into a social commentary about the fear of dying in battle, prejudice, and discrimination.

== Production history ==
After thirteen previews, the show opened on March 6, 1974, at the Shubert Theatre, where it ran for 341 performances and became the top-grossing production of the 1974 Broadway season. It is largely credited as the Broadway musical which launched many careers. The opening night cast included Patty and Maxene Andrews (of the Andrews Sisters) and newcomers John Travolta, Treat Williams, Marilu Henner, Samuel E. Wright, and Ann Reinking, all of whom went on to achieve successful careers. Despite still playing to capacity audiences, the show closed on January 4, 1975, under controversial conditions. "The producers blamed Patty and Maxine, claiming they wanted more money and made unreasonable demands, and cancelled the national tour. The Andrews sisters blamed the producers, claiming they had mismanaged the show from the beginning and were now using them as scapegoats." According to an article in The New York Times, the tour was cancelled due to a "salary dispute" between the Andrews sisters and the producers.

Radar online and the official site reported that Cody Linley would be starring in an all-new production of Over Here! set to launch early in 2010 at the Saban Theatre, Beverly Hills and an official website showed open auditions. In an interview, Linley confirmed that he would play the role of Bill. The production has been postponed indefinitely.

The postponed 2010 production was an "all-new" production with a modified book by original playwright Will Holt, choreographed by Tony Stevens, designed by Royal Court designer Mark Walters with associate designer Christopher Hone and Costume Designer David Toser, featuring Music Supervision by David Barber. Dick Van Dyke had agreed to head an all-star cast; however, he was forced to withdraw days before the start date when his partner Michelle's illness became terminal. Unable to find an immediate replacement for Van Dyke at such short notice, the producers rescheduled the production to premiere in California in 2016, following which a US tour was planned. Neither came to fruition.

There was a 2019 Off-Broadway revival at the Triad Theatre in New York City starring Debbie Gravitte, Haley Swindal as Pauline, Jessica Hendy as Paulette, Nikka Graff Lanzarone as Mitzi, Mark William, Dani Apple, and Kristina Nicole Miller. The production was adapted into a 85-minute one act by director Will Nunziata, music director Blake Allen, and choreographer Andrew Black. The revival featured all the music from the original Broadway production, albeit in a different order, except for "Don't Shoo the Hooey to Me, Louie". The third verse of "Star-Spangled Banner" was sung by Miller where in the original production, the anthem was spoken.

== Song list ==
Act I

- The Beat Begins (Overture) - The Big Band
- Since You're Not Around - Makeout, Rankin, Mother, Father, Sarge and Company
- Over Here! - Paulette and Pauline de Paul
- Buy a Victory Bond - Company
- My Dream for Tomorrow - June and Bill
- Charlie's Place - Pauline de Paul, Maggie, Lucky, The Big Band and Company
- Hey Yvette/The Grass Grows Green - Spokesman, Rankin and Father
- The Good-Time Girl (later called "The V.D. Polka") - Paulette de Paul and Company
- Wait for Me Marlena - Mitzi and Company
- We Got It - Paulette de Paul, Pauline de Paul, Mitzi and Company

Act II

- The Beat Continues (Entr'acte) - The Big Band and Company
- Wartime Wedding - Paulette de Paul, Pauline de Paul and Company
- Don't Shoot the Hooey to Me, Louie - Sam
- Where Did the Good Times Go? - Paulette de Paul
- Dream Drummin'/Soft Music - Misfit, The Big Band and Company
- The Big Beat - Paulette de Paul, Pauline de Paul and Mitzi
- No Goodbyes - Paulette de Paul, Pauline de Paul and Company

Curtain Call

- Hits Medley - Patty and Maxene Andrews

== Awards and nominations ==
=== Original Broadway production ===
Year	Award	Category	Nominee	Result
1974	Tony Award	Best Musical		Nominated
1974	Tony Award	Best Performance by a Featured Actress in a Musical	Janie Sell	Won
1974	Tony Award	Best Direction of a Musical	Tom Moore	Nominated
1974	Tony Award	Best Choreography	Patricia Birch	Nominated
1974	Tony Award	Best Costume Design	Carrie F. Robbins	Nominated
1974	Drama Desk Award	Outstanding Set Design	Douglas W. Schmidt	Won
1974	Drama Desk Award	Outstanding Costume Design	Carrie F. Robbins	Won
1974	Theatre World Award		John Driver	Won
1974	Theatre World Award		Ann Reinking	Won
1974	Theatre World Award		Janie Sell	Won

=== 2019 Revival ===
Year	Award	Category	Nominee	Result
2020	BroadwayWorld Award	Best Special Event		Nominated
2020	BroadwayWorld Award	Best Director	Will Nunziata	Nominated
2020	BroadwayWorld Award	Best Musical Director	Blake Allen	Nominated
2020	BroadwayWorld Award	Best Vocalist	Jessica Hendy	Nominated
