= Ilene Graff =

American actress and singer (born 1949)

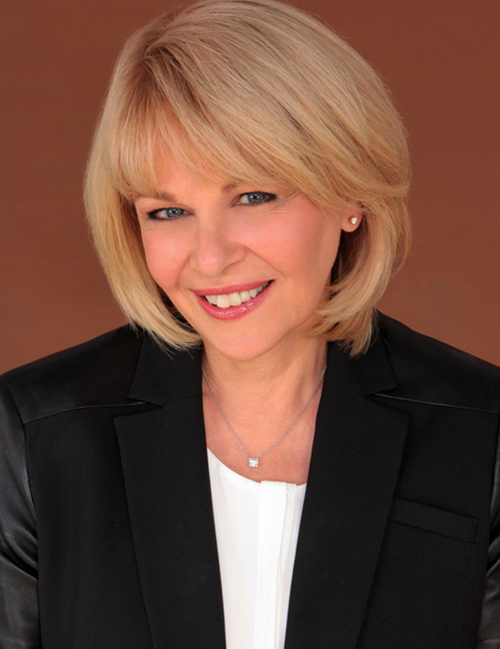
- Born: February 28, 1949 (age 77); Brooklyn, New York, U.S.
- Occupations: Actress; singer
- Years active: 1979–present
- Known for: Marsha Cameron Owens in Mr. Belvedere
- Spouse: Ben Lanzarone (m. 1978; died 2024)
- Children: Nikka Graff Lanzarone
- Relatives: Todd Graff (brother); Randy Graff (cousin)
- Website: ilenegraff.com

Ilene Graff (born February 28, 1949) is an American actress and singer.

== Early years ==
Graff was born on February 28, 1949, in Brooklyn, New York, the daughter of musician Jerry Graff, and piano teacher Judy Graff. She attended Ithaca College.

== Life and career ==
Graff's Broadway credits include Promises, Promises, Grease, and I Love My Wife. On television, Graff portrayed Penny Whitaker on Supertrain. Her other television work includes Barnaby Jones, Laverne & Shirley, Mork & Mindy, Three's Company, Lewis & Clark, and St. Elsewhere. From 1985 until 1990, she played what is possibly her best known role, Marsha Cameron Owens, the wife of Bob Uecker's character, George, in the sitcom Mr. Belvedere.

In addition to her roles on television, Graff also appeared in the motion picture Ladybugs playing the girlfriend of Rodney Dangerfield and mother of Jonathan Brandis. Her recent screen credits include films The Things We Carry, Ma-i pa-deo, and Loving Annabelle.

== Personal life ==
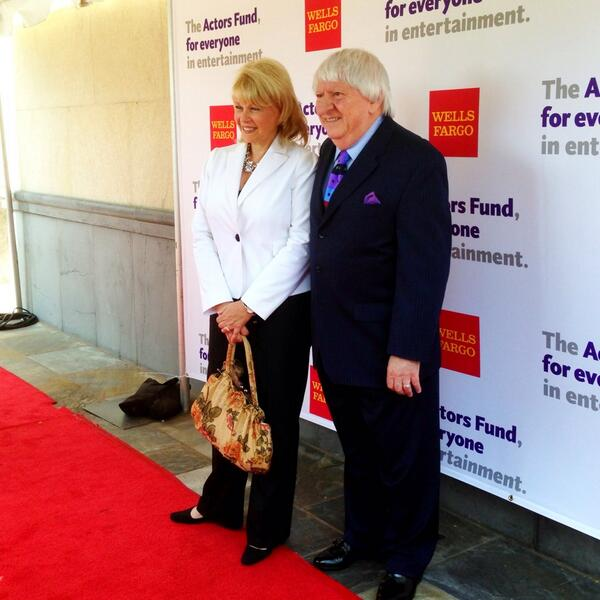
Graff and Husband Ben Lanzarone in 2013

While performing in Grease Graff met and married composer Ben Lanzarone, and they have one daughter, Nikka, born 1983. Graff is the older sister of Tony Award-nominated actor, film producer, writer, film director and former Short Circus member Todd Graff and cousin of Tony winner Randy Graff. She serves as the spokesman for the AMC Cancer Research Center.

== Select filmography ==
- Hart of Dixie .... Ellen Aim (6 episodes, 2011-2015)
- The Things We Carry (2009) .... Ellen Aim
- My Father (2007) .... Nancy Parker ... aka Ellen Aim (South Korea: DVD title)
- Loving Annabelle (2006) .... Mother Immaculata
- Living with Fran .... Jessica (1 episode, 2006)
- Haunted .... Emily Eastway (1 episode, 2002)
- South Pacific (2001) (TV) .... Singing Ngana ... aka Rodgers & Hammerstein's South Pacific (USA: complete title)
- Touched by an Angel .... Gloria Brewer (1 episode, 1997)
- Abandoned and Deceived (1995) (TV)
- Sisters.... Cynthia (1 episode, 1994)
- Ladybugs (1992) .... Bess
- Walter & Emily .... Dr. Barbara Morris (1 episode, 1992)
- Opposites Attract (1990) (TV) .... Frannie
- Mr. Belvedere .... Marsha Cameron Owens (117 episodes, 1985–1990)
- Jury Duty: The Comedy (1990; TV) .... Marilyn Worth ... aka The Great American Sex Scandal
- New Love, American Style (1 episode, 1986) .... Love at First Sight/Love and the Judge (1986; TV)
- St. Elsewhere .... Heidi Brechman (1 episode, 1985)
- Earthlings (1984) (TV) .... Jane Lassiter
- The Paper Chase.... Carolyn (1 episode, 1983)
- Three's Company .... Daphne Smith (1 episode, 1983)
- Charley's Aunt (1983; TV) .... Kitty Verdun
- Remington Steele.... Ivy Shapiro (1 episode, 1982)
- Madame's Place.... Gloria Beecham Meade (1 episode, 1982)
- Mork & Mindy .... Tracy /Receptionist ... (4 episodes, 1981-1982)
- Lewis & Clark .... Alicia Lewis (3 episodes, 1981)
- Laverne & Shirley .... Monique Dobson (1 episode, 1980)
- Beulah Land (1980; TV mini-series) .... Annabel Davis
- Angie.... Debbie (1 episode, 1980)
- Supertrain .... Penny Whitaker (3 episodes, 1979)
- Barnaby Jones .... Stephanie Capello (2 episodes, 1979)
