= Therapy (New York City) =

Defunct gay bar and nightclub in Manhattan, New York, U.S.

- Logo

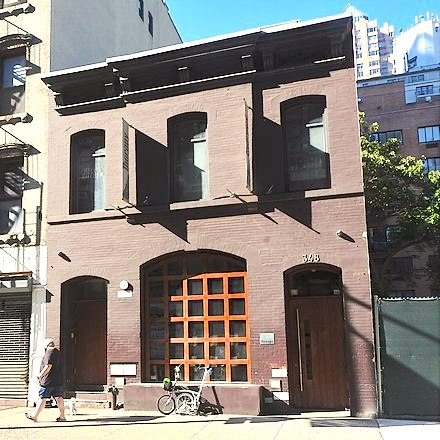
- The venue's exterior in 2020
- Interactive map of Therapy
- Address: 348 West 52nd Street
- Location: Hell's Kitchen, Manhattan, New York, U.S.
- Coordinates: 40°45′50.6″N 73°59′12.9″W
- Owner: Tom Johnson
- Type: Gay bar; nightclub
- Public transit: New York City Subway: 50th Street station (C and E trains); 50th Street station (1 train); Seventh Avenue station (B, D, and E trains)

Construction
- Opened: 2003
- Closed: March 2020

Website
- therapy-nyc.com

Therapy was a two-story gay bar and nightclub in the Hell's Kitchen neighborhood of Manhattan in New York City. It hosted frequent drag shows, some of which featured performers who later rose to prominence on RuPaul's Drag Race. The venue was a favorite Monday-night stop for Broadway actors, who sometimes participated in the club's shows. Like other New York City nightlife establishments, Therapy was ordered to close temporarily in March 2020 due to the COVID-19 pandemic. In July of that year, the venue's owner announced that it was unlikely to reopen, citing financial troubles. Therapy's atmosphere, drink selection, food and entertainment have generally received positive remarks from critics.

== Description ==
Therapy was located at 348 West 52nd Street in Manhattan, between Eighth and Ninth Avenues. It was directly across the street from Industry, another gay nightclub. According to Time Out New York, Therapy's interior was characterized by "two levels of slate floors connected by a dramatic staircase, crowned with a massive skylight. Mellow pop, house and techno play at the perfect level, allowing for both conversation and grooving." The club served food and featured live entertainment most nights.

According to Gothamist, "[Therapy contained] seating and full bars both upstairs and down, as well as music videos projected onto a screen in the upstairs area." As of mid-2019, it hosted drag shows five nights a week. Many of the clientele were tourists drawn to New York by Broadway musicals, whose cast members also frequented the bar. Celebrity participation in "Stage Fright", the Monday-night drag show hosted by Marti Gould Cummings, was not uncommon. Thrillist's Melissa Kravitz Hoeffner wrote of the show: "Broadway stars like Michael Longoria, Ann Reinking, and Tamyra Gray [were] unafraid to compete for attention and perhaps suffer some deprecation at the hands of a quick-witted drag queen in this sprawling lounge." A 2017 New York Times article counted Adam Pascal, Alice Ripley and Michael Cerveris among other Broadway names to appear on stage with Cummings at Therapy.

== History ==
Therapy was established in a duplex, which originally served as a carriage house, in Hell's Kitchen in 2003. Over the years, the bar's drag shows were hosted by several performers who went on to appear on RuPaul's Drag Race, including Peppermint, Sahara Davenport, Bianca Del Rio, Bob the Drag Queen, Monét X Change and Jan Sport. Other prominent drag queens, including Sherry Vine, also had shows there. Among Therapy's popular weekly shows was "Sunday Services", a church-themed performance starring Lagoona Bloo, Jackie Cox and Kizha Carr.

The club briefly closed in late May 2019 due to structural issues with a neighboring building, which had to be partially demolished. Two weeks later, on June 14, Therapy was permitted to reopen.

=== COVID-19 pandemic and closure ===
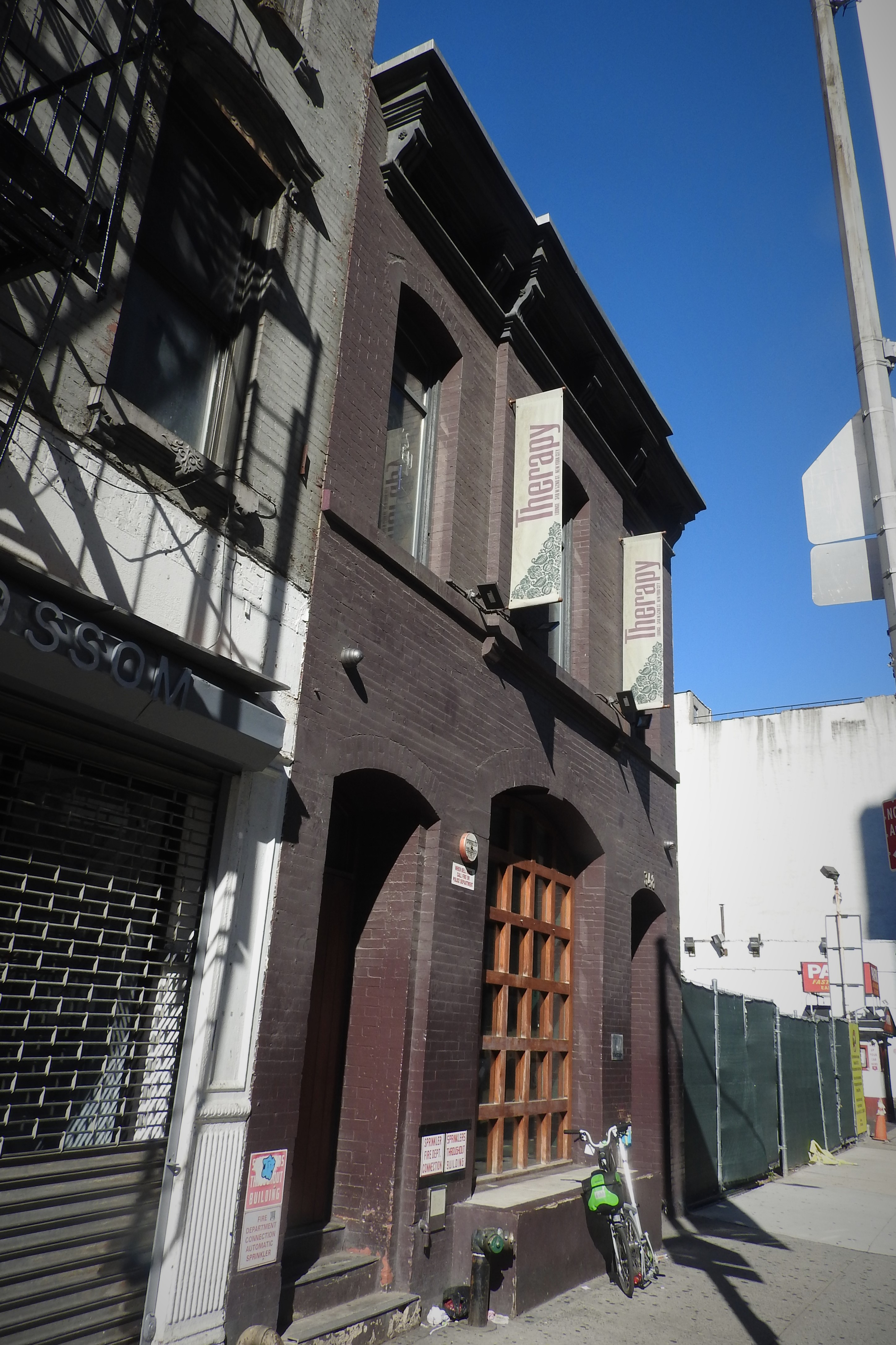
The bar's exterior, August 2020

In March 2020, Therapy again closed down when New York State nightlife venues were ordered to shutter due to the COVID-19 pandemic. The venue's co-owner, Tom Johnson, said he opted not to offer outdoor dining or to-go drinks when those services became permissible, because doing so would have brought in only 30–40% of the usual revenue, which would not have been sufficient to compensate staff. He also said that operating at half-capacity to abide by social distancing regulations would leave the establishment unable to cover operating costs.

Citing these and other financial difficulties, Johnson announced in July that the bar would likely remain closed for good. Eater New York reported that "Johnson holds a glimmer of hope for Therapy's revival but isn't sure if the financial fallout from the pandemic will allow it". He told the publication, "It's great if people want to come together and invest in Therapy at some point ... I want nothing more than for all of this to go away, but I don't see that happening anytime soon."

In 2021, a new nightclub called Hush opened in the space that housed Therapy.

== Reception ==
In his 2015 list of "the best gay bars in Hell's Kitchen" for Time Out New York, Ethan LaCroix wrote: "Drinks like the Freudian Sip (Ketel One Citron, fresh ginger and lemonade), served in a nice big tumbler, are sure to leave you feeling blissfully worry-free at this cocktailcentric space. But it's the impressive venue that draws young neurotics." A review by Gothamist staff reads: "Therapy is the quintessential Hell's Kitchen hot spot and it has it all: comfort food, dancing, two levels and polite cocktail servers. Just avoid the nasty DJs, who do not make any song requests!... It's a spacious venue with an easy crowd; I'm always pleased to be invited there." On a 2019 list of New York City's 16 best LGBTQ bars for Thrillist, Kyler Alvord said:

This may not be the best Therapy for social anxiety, but if you're soothed by Absolut-forward cocktails in plastic cups and hundreds of sweaty guys pressed up against you, start your treatment at this HK lounge. DJs, live music, and drag entertainment make this place a party nearly every night of the week. Visitors here have planned a night out and are laser-focused on fun.

== See also ==
- Impact of the COVID-19 pandemic on the LGBTQ community
- LGBTQ culture in New York City
