= Metropolitan Baptist Church (New York City) =

Church in Manhattan, New York

- Metropolitan Baptist Church (New York Presbyterian Church)
- U.S. National Register of Historic Places
- New York State Register of Historic Places
- New York City Landmark
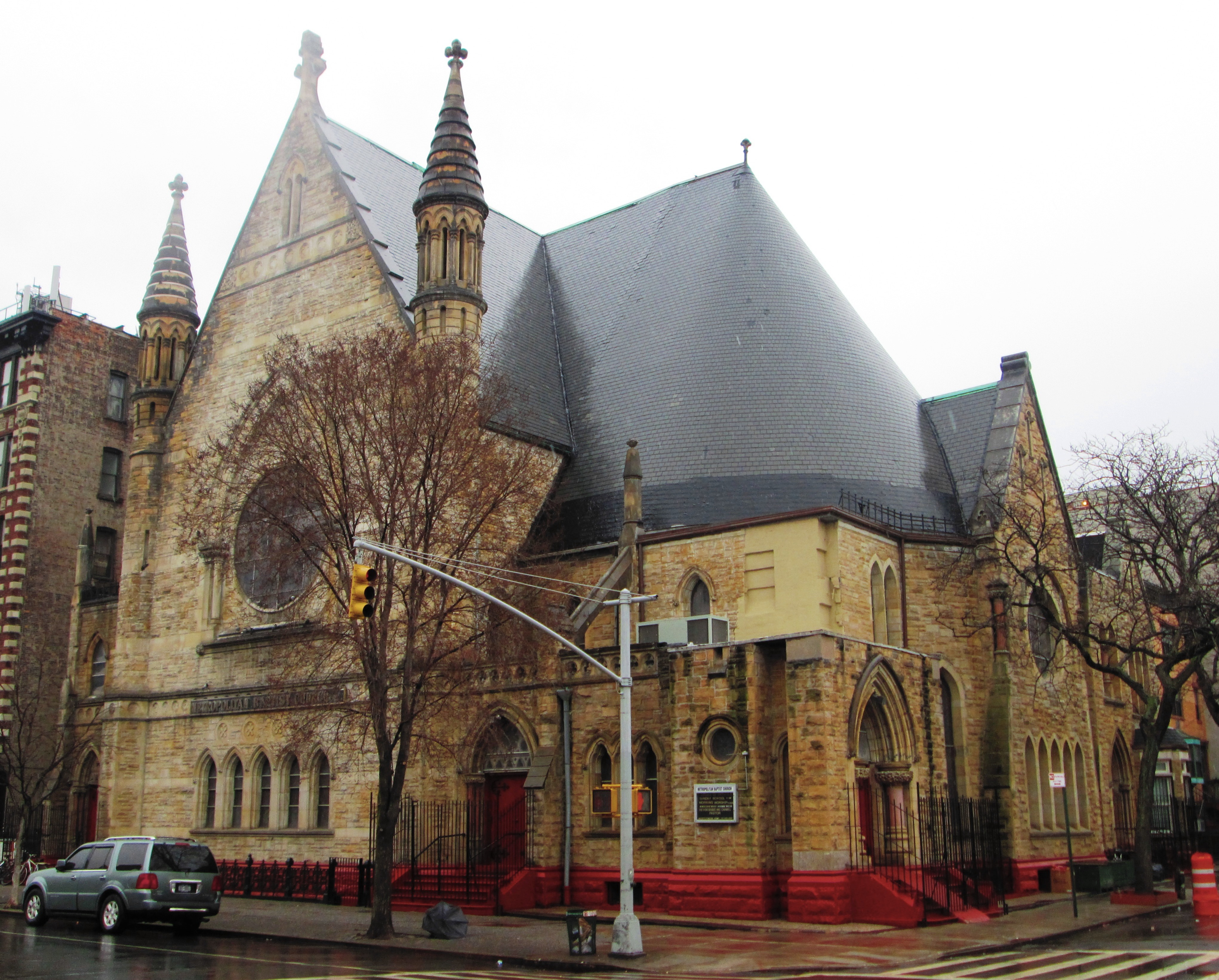
- (2014)

- Location within New York City Location within New York Location within the United States
- Location: 151 W. 128th St. Manhattan, New York City
- Coordinates: 40°48′39″N 73°56′47″W
- Built: 1884-85, 1889-90
- Architect: John Rochester Thomas (chapel and lecture room, 1884-85); Richard R. Davis (sanctuary, 1889-90)
- Architectural style: Romanesque Revival, Gothic Revival
- NRHP reference No.: 82003385
- NYSRHP No.: 06101.001669
- NYCL No.: 1134

Significant dates
- Added to NRHP: June 3, 1982
- Designated NYSRHP: September 22, 1983
- Designated NYCL: February 3, 1981

The Metropolitan Baptist Church, located at 151 West 128th Street on the corner of Adam Clayton Powell Jr. Boulevard in the Harlem neighborhood of Manhattan, New York City, was originally built in two sections for the New York Presbyterian Church, which moved to the new building from 167 West 111th Street. The chapel and lecture room were built in 1884-85 and were designed by John Rochester Thomas, while the main sanctuary was constructed in 1889-90 and was designed by Richard R. Davis, perhaps following Thomas's unused design. A planned corner tower was never built.

In 1918, the church was acquired by the Metropolitan Baptist Church, a congregation founded in 1912 which was one of the first African American congregations in Harlem. They moved to this building from the Metropolitan Baptist Tabernacle at 120 West 138th Street, which later became Liberty Hall, a focus of the Back-to-Africa movement.

The church was designated a New York City Landmark in 1981, and was listed on the National Register of Historic Places in 1982.

== Description ==
Despite the split construction, the granite-faced building, which combines Romanesque Revival and Gothic Revival elements, holds together as a single design. The building is two and one half stories topped by a tremendous slate roof shaped as a partial cone. The front facade features groups of stained glass, Gothic-arched lancet windows at various levels. Thin finialed towers are prominent on the west facade of the building. The total effect is "handsome" and "monumental".

== See also ==
- List of New York City Designated Landmarks in Manhattan above 110th Street
- National Register of Historic Places listings in Manhattan above 110th Street
