= Ben Lanzarone =

American composer (1938–2024)

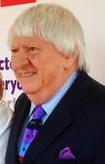
- Lanzarone in 2013
- Born: Benjamin Anthony Lanzarone; October 28, 1938; New York City, New York, U.S.
- Died: February 16, 2024 (aged 85); Los Angeles, California, U.S.
- Spouse: Ilene Graff (m. 1978)
- Children: Nikka Graff Lanzarone

Benjamin Anthony Lanzarone (October 28, 1938 – February 16, 2024) was an American composer, arranger and music director. He was best known for composing incidental soundtrack music for television shows, including episodes of Dynasty, Happy Days and The Tracey Ullman Show.

Lanzarone studied at the Manhattan School of Music and began his career as a classical pianist, making his debut at Carnegie Hall. But he moved into popular music through collaborations with Charles Fox and Bob Crewe. He was the musical director on the original 1972-80 Broadway production of Grease and toured with Frank Sinatra, Petula Clark and Art Garfunkel. As a pianist, he issued the album In Classic Form on the DynoVoice label in 1968.

He was the winner of ASCAP's Most Performed Composer Award. in 1977 Lanzarone married actress Ilene Graff. Their daughter Nikka was born in 1983. Ben Lanzarone died from lung cancer on February 16, 2024, at the age of 85.

== Filmography ==
=== Composer ===
- "The Love Boat" (1979-1986)
- "Dynasty" (1982-1985)
- "Happy Days" (1978- 1980)
- "The Colbys" (1985-1987)
- "Hotel" (1983-1985)
- "Mork and Mindy" (1978)
- "Mr. Belvedere"
- "Laverne and Shirley"
- "Aloha Paradise"
- "Tracy Ullman Show"
- "Vegas"
- "Matt Houston"
- "Shirley"
- "Out of the Blue"
- "Good Time Girls"
- "Glitter"
