= Nikka Graff Lanzarone =

American actress

Nikka Graff
- Born: Nikka Graff Lanzarone; November 20, 1983 (age 42); Los Angeles, California
- Occupations: Actress; dancer; singer
- Spouse: Daniel Smith
- Parents: Ben Lanzarone (father); Ilene Graff (mother)
- Website: www.nikka-graff-lanzarone.com Official website

Nikka Graff Lanzarone (born November 20, 1983) is an actress and dancer.

== Early life ==
On November 20, 1983, Lanzarone was born in Los Angeles, California. Her mother is Ilene Graff, an actress. Lanzarone's father is Ben Lanzarone, a composer. She is the niece of director and actor Todd Graff

== Career ==
Lanzarone graduated from the Boston Conservatory with a degree in Musical Theatre. Her first professional performance following her education was in Jerry Mitchell's Peepshow in Las Vegas. Broadway saw her debut as Marisa in Women on the Verge of a Nervous Breakdown, based on the Pedro Almodóvar film of the same name. Her last Broadway performance was in Chicago as the iconic Velma Kelly.

She starred as "Mitzi" in the 2019 Off-Broadway revival of the Sherman Brothers' Over Here!. The production was directed by Will Nunziata with musical direction by Blake Allen and starred Tony Award winner Debbie Gravitte, Haley Swindal as Pauline, and Jessica Hendy as Paulette.

== Theatre ==
Broadway

- Women on the Verge of a Nervous Breakdown (2010)
- Chicago (2011)

Off-Broadway

- Seussical The Musical (2011)
- Hello Again (2011)
- Zorba! (City Center Encores!, 2015)
- Sweet Charity (2016)

== Select filmography ==
- Bandslam (2009) (Movie) .... New Art Teacher
- Outside the Box (2011) .... Marion Crane (1 episode, 2014)
- Unforgettable (2014) .... Heather
- Divorce (2018)
- The Marvelous Mrs. Maisel (2018) .... Myrna
