= Nicolas Putvinski =

Russian fashion designer

Nicolas Putvinski is a Russian fashion designer. He was a contestant on the US reality television series Project Runway (season 6), in which he finished in 7th place.

He subsequently went on to do costume design for theater, including 2020's Wet Dream, and a 2018 production of Cleopatra.

His work was also a part of Billy Porter's 2019 Met Gala outfit.
