= MAC Awards =

Annual US music awards show organized by the Manhattan Association of Cabarets

The MAC Awards, established in 1986, are presented annually to honor achievements in cabaret, comedy and jazz. They are administered by the non-profit Manhattan Association of Cabarets & Clubs (MAC), founded in 1983, and voted on by the MAC membership.

The Awards encompass more than two dozen categories, such as: vocalists and vocal groups, piano bar and jazz performers, comedy and musical performers, writers of songs and special material, directors, musical directors, recordings, and musical revues. In addition, through special awards, MAC salutes outstanding contributions to the field of live entertainment, including Lifetime Achievement Awards. Honorees of the MAC Awards have included Liza Minnelli, Barry Manilow, Rosemary Clooney, Stephen Schwartz, The Manhattan Transfer, Keely Smith, Betty Buckley, Maureen McGovern, Polly Bergen, and BenDeLaCreme.

== Association ==
The Manhattan Association of Cabarets & Clubs (MAC) itself was founded in 1983 as an organization "for cabaret owners, managers, and booking agents to meet and exchange ideas." Its membership was opened to performers in 1985. The Board of Directors began bestowing its MAC Awards in 1986 to those they deemed "had made a contribution to live entertainment, whether a business person, local performer, dedicated critic, or cabaret luminary." Currently, the Awards are voted on by the MAC membership and honor cabaret, comedy, and jazz performers, as well as behind- the-scenes professionals.

Curt Davis was the first president of MAC. After his death he was succeeded by Erv Raible, co-owner of several New York piano bars and cabarets. Other MAC presidents have included Jamie deRoy, Michael Estwanick, Barry Levitt, Judy Barnett, Scott Barbarino and Ricky Ritzel. The Association's current president is Lennie Watts, appointed in 2009.A 501C6 trade organization with a dues-paying membership, MAC differs from a 501C3-designated organization in that contributions to it are not tax deductible. According to the organization's website, "MAC’s mission is to advance the art and business of live entertainment ... its activities are designed to heighten public awareness of the field’s contributions and vitality, to honor its creativity, to build its current and future audiences, and to speak out as an influential voice on behalf of MAC members and the industry at large."
