= Oryantal Dans =

Turkish style of belly dance

Oryantal Dans (Oryantal dansı) is a Turkish style of belly dance that developed through the blending of Ottoman court traditions, Romani culture, and Middle Eastern dance forms. Known for its energetic rhythms, theatrical presentation and dynamic floorwork, Turkish Oryantal evolved during the late Ottoman period and gained widespread popularity in 20th-century Istanbul nightclub and cabaret scenes. Distinguished by fast rhythms, sharp isolations and vibrant costumes, Oryantal Dans has become an important part of Turkey’s performing arts heritage and continues to influence international belly dance styles today.

== History ==
=== Köçek and Çengi ===
The origins of belly dance in Turkey trace back to the performance traditions of the Ottoman Empire, where dance played a prominent role in both court and popular settings. From the 16th century onward, one of the most visible figures in this sphere was the köçek—young male dancers who wore ornate, feminine costumes and performed stylized, rhythmic dances at palace celebrations, weddings, and public festivals. Alongside them were the çengi—female dancers who combined movement, music, and narrative performance. Both traditions challenged gender norms of their time, with köçeks in particular occupying a liminal space that blurred the boundaries between masculinity and femininity.

By the late 19th and early 20th centuries, the presence of female dancers in public spaces increased, particularly in Istanbul’s taverns, festivals, and early cabarets. This shift coincided with the gradual decline of the köçek tradition, which faced growing criticism from reformist and nationalist movements. Nevertheless, the stylistic legacy of the köçeks—such as expressive isolations, theatrical flair and elaborate costuming—remained visible in what would later be identified as Turkish Oryantal dance. This emerging style blended elements of Ottoman classical music and dance, Anatolian folk traditions, and Western staging practices, producing a uniquely Turkish aesthetic distinct from its Egyptian counterpart. Dancers such as Adalat Emine Pehlivan and Afranza Hanım are often cited among the early figures who embodied this transformation. Performance theorists such as Marvin Carlson have noted that such evolving forms of expression are best understood as layered cultural texts—shaped by identity, audience, and historical moment.

=== Origin ===
Oryantal Dans, as it became known in the 20th century, has roots in classical Ottoman entertainment but evolved into a theatrical performance art that integrated new stylistic influences. Çengi and köçek dancers had long entertained both courtly and popular audiences in the Ottoman Empire, and their legacy provided the foundational movement vocabulary and aesthetics for later performers. Over time, these traditions absorbed elements from Romani, Persian, Byzantine, and Arab cultures, reflecting the empire's diverse makeup.The çengi and köçek are believed to be precursors of Turkish Oryantal dans. It has also been heavily influenced by Romani dance as well.

A major transformation of stage Oriental dance into its modern theatrical form occurred in the early 20th century, when Lebanese-Syrian entrepreneur Badia Masabni opened her nightclub in Cairo in 1926. Masabni stated in a 1966 interview that she fused Egyptian traditional dance with elements of Turkish Oryantal, Persian dance, and Western Latin dance styles to appeal to cosmopolitan audiences. She emphasized stage choreography, evening gowns instead of folk costumes, and introduced ballet-inspired group formations, helping to popularize "Raqs Sharqi" (Eastern Dance) as an international art form.

In Turkey, Oryantal Dans developed in parallel, shaped by Ottoman traditions, Romani influence, and later by cabaret innovations. During the early 20th century, Istanbul’s nightlife scene—especially in districts like Beyoğlu and Şişli—gave rise to a theatrical belly dance style distinct from Egyptian forms. Dancers such as Nejla Ateş achieved international fame, and Turkish Oryantal became known for its emphasis on fast rhythms, strong isolations, and elaborate costuming.

== Timeline ==
Date	Event
15th–16th centuries	Çengi (female court dancers) documented in the Ottoman Empire.
16th–17th centuries	Köçek (male dancers) become popular in Ottoman courts.
19th century	Romani musicians and dancers heavily influence Ottoman entertainment culture.
1926	Badia Masabni opens a nightclub in Cairo, modernizing Oriental dance by fusing Turkish, Egyptian, Persian, and Latin influences.
1950s–1970s	Turkish Oryantal flourishes in Istanbul nightclubs and dinner clubs like Tepebaşı Casino, Gar Gazinosu dinner club, Karevanseray, Galata Kulesi, and Maksim Gazinosu.
1980s–2000s	Performers like Nesrin Topkapı, Sema Yildiz, and Didem expand Turkish Oryantal's visibility.
2000s–present	Male dancers like Zadiel Sasmaz, Azad Kaan, Serkan Tutar, Özgen and Chris of Melbourne achieve international attention.

== Terminology ==
In Turkey, belly dance is commonly referred to as oryantal dansı (from the French oriental) or göbek dansı ("belly dance"). Male performers are sometimes called zenne, a historical Ottoman term.

=== Music in Turkish Oryantal ===
The music accompanying Turkish Oryantal dance draws from a diverse set of traditions, combining classical Ottoman court music, Romani rhythms, Anatolian folk melodies, and Arabic influences. A defining feature of Turkish belly dance music is the frequent use of complex, driving rhythms, particularly the 9/8 time signature—often referred to as the karsilama rhythm—which provides a fast-paced and energetic base for movement. Instrumentation typically includes the darbuka (goblet drum), zurna (reed instrument), kanun (plucked zither), clarinet, violin, and occasionally accordion—reflecting both Romani and urban Turkish musical heritage. These musical elements not only shape the dancer’s tempo and emotional tone, but also reinforce regional aesthetics distinct from Egyptian or Lebanese raqs sharqi. In modern cabaret settings, especially during the mid-20th century, orchestras incorporated improvisational solos and theatrical crescendos to match the dynamic style of performers like Nejla Ateş and others active in Istanbul’s nightlife venues.

== Venues in Istanbul ==
Major venues included nightclubs and dinner clubs like: Tepebaşı Casino, Gar Gazinosu dinner club, Karevanseray, Galata Kulesi, and Maksim Gazinosu. Dancers like Didem, Sema Yıldız, and Özel Türkbaş helped popularize Oryantal in clubs.

== Costumes ==
Costumes evolved from flowing dresses to two-piece outfits with sequins and metallic fabrics.

== Props ==
- Veil
- Zills (Finger cymbals)
- Tambourine

== Notable practitioners ==
- Artemis Mourat
- Asena (belly dancer)
- Azad Kaan
- Birgül Beray
- Didem
- Inci Birol
- Kudret Sandra
- Medzeke
- Nejla Ateş
- Nergis Mogol
- Nesrin Topkapı
- Nimet Alp
- Özcan Tekgül
- Özel Türkbaş
- Özgen Ozgenc
- Saliha Tekneci
- Seher Şeniz
- Sibel Can
- Sema Yildiz
- Tülay Karaca

Researcher and dancer Artemis Mourat also lists Nesrin Topkapı, Tülay Karaca, Sema Yildiz, and Birgül Berai as key dancers.

== Male belly dancers: Turkish style ==
Modern male Oryantal dancers include:

- Zadiel Sasmaz
- Azad Kaan
- Serkan Tutar
- Özgen
- Kudret Sandra
- Erhan Ay
- Diva Murat
- Chris of Melbourne

== In popular culture ==
Oryantal Dans has been a major feature of cinema of Turkey and television in Turkey since the 1940s. Notable figures include Adalat Pee, Özcan Tekgül, İnci Birol, Leyla Sayar, Nimet Alp, Semra, Nergis Mogol, Seher Şeniz, and Sema Yildiz.

TV stars include Nesrin Topkapı, Tülay Karaca, Sema Yildiz, Tanyeli Çağrı, Efruz, Prenses Banu, Sibel Can, Asena, and Didem.

Sema Yildiz also promoted Turkish dance abroad, especially in Japan. Nesrin Topkapı trained Turkish singers Hadise, Sertab Erener, Nurgül Yeşilçay, and Nil Karaibrahimgil.

== Comparison to Egyptian style ==
Turkish Oryantal is faster, more theatrical, and acrobatic compared to Egyptian Raqs Sharqi which is more grounded and fluid.

== See also ==
- Belly dance
- Köçek
- Çengi
- Music of Turkey
- Romani dance
- Middle Eastern dances
- Raqs Sharqi
- Gender and sexual minorities in the Ottoman Empire
