= Environmental injustice in Europe =

Exposure of groups to environmental harms

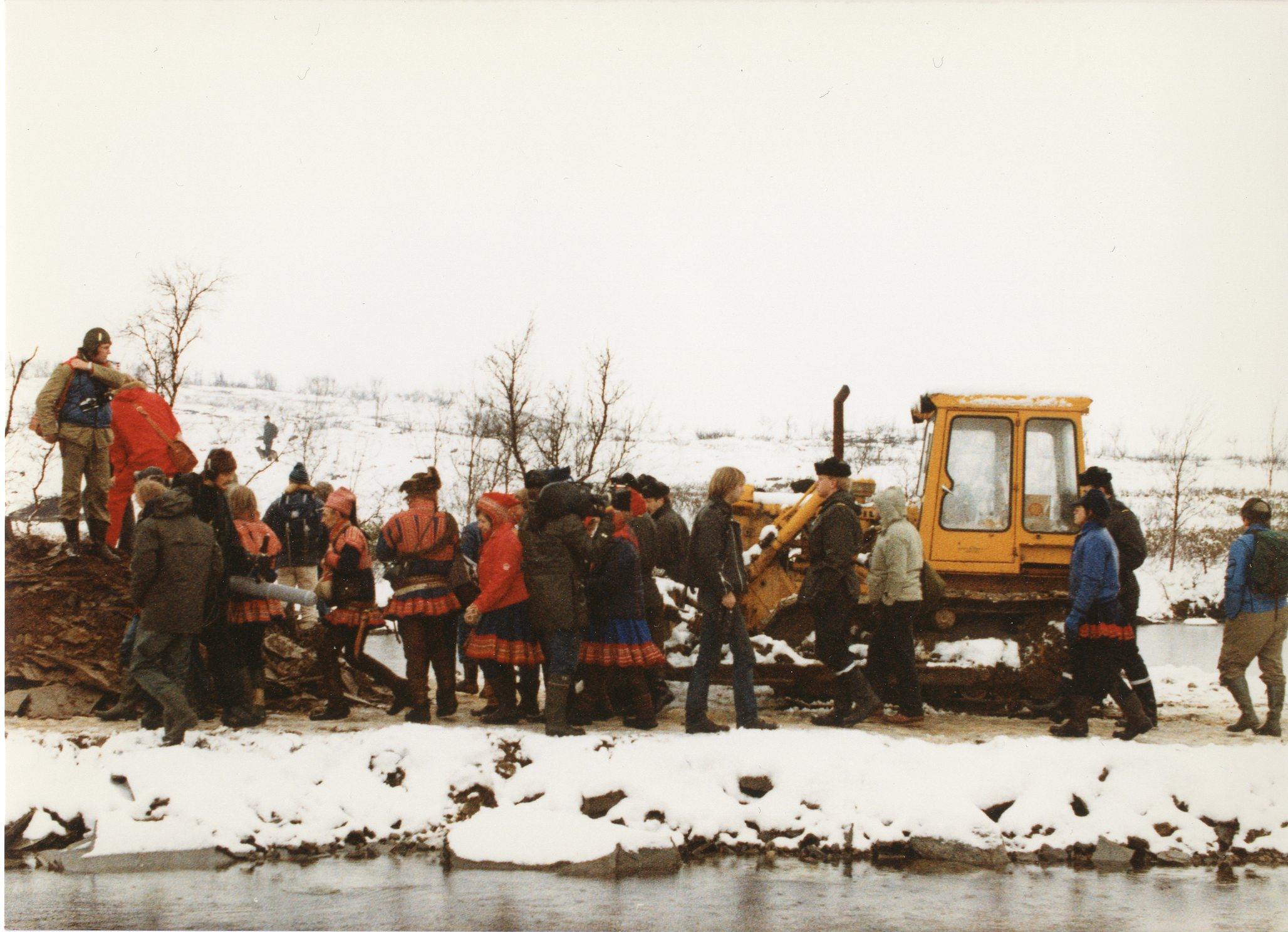
Blockade against Alta hydroelectric project on traditional Sami territories in Norway. The project was completed in 1987.

Environmental injustice is the exposure of poor and marginalised communities to a disproportionate share of environmental harms such as hazardous waste, when they do not receive benefits from the land uses that create these hazards. Environmental racism is environmental injustice in a racialised context. These issues may lead to infringement of environmentally related human rights.

Environmental justice is a social movement to address these issues.

In Europe, environmental racism has been postulated in particular toward Romani communities. According to Trehan and Kocze (2009), "EU accession for the post-socialist countries has resulted in a de facto centre and periphery within Europe itself, thus exacerbating the already marginal economic and political position of Roma in Europe whose communities continue to subsist as internal colonies within Europe." This peripheral position, in which segregated Romani settlements and their inhabitants become viewed as de-territorialized zones "beyond the pale" of government responsibility and European Union citizenship, has been identified by some scholars as an aggravating factor in the prevalence of environmental hazards (such as proximity to industrial facilities and illegal or toxic waste dumps). This practice has been identified in relation to the lack of basic services such as water, housing, sanitation and access to education affecting marginalized Romani communities.

== Central and Eastern Europe ==
In Central and Eastern Europe, socialist governments have generally prioritized industrial development over environmental protection, in spite of growing public and governmental environmental awareness in the 1960s and 1970s. Even though public concern over the environmental effects of industrial expansion such as mine and dam construction grew in the late 1980s and early 1990s, policy makers continued to focus on privatization and economic development. Following the market transition, environmental issues have persisted, despite some improvements during the early stages of transition. Throughout this time, significant social restructuring took place alongside environmental changes.

== Western Europe ==
Environmental racism is a prevalent issue in all of Western Europe which primarily affects individuals of minority ethnic backgrounds and racial groups.

== Turkey ==
There are between 500,000 and 2.5 million Romani people in Turkey. Most Romani, both itinerant and sedentary, live in Trakya (Thrace) and Marmara regions in the northwest of the country, and generally inhabit settlements that are socio-geographically distinct and isolated from majority populations. Romani in Turkey "suffer much higher levels of ill-health, have poorer housing, and higher incidences of discrimination on the basis of their ethnicity." In at least two cases (the 2010 demolition of Sulukule and the 1970 Bayramiç forest products industry dispute), conflicts surrounding access to land and natural resources has led to the dislocation of entire Romani communities.

=== Sulukule ===
In February 2010, the predominantly Romani community of Sulukule in Istanbul, an ancient neighbourhood included on the UNESCO World Heritage list and Istanbul City Wall Preservation Zone, as well as the oldest Romani settlement in Europe was demolished as part of an urban renewal scheme. Earlier demolitions had taken place in the mid-1960s and in 1982 when the old core of Sulukule was torn down. As a central area of Istanbul, Sulukule was subject to land speculation, while underlying ecological and environmental issues were potentially exploited as part of the arguments for demolition. According to Aslı Kıyak İngin and Pelin Tan

Throughout the year 2000, Istanbul witnessed the emergence of large-scale urban transformation projects under the headings of "urban renovation/urban development" which legitimised 'demolishment' and 'reconstruction' via abstract discourses of urban fear, ecology, cultural heritage and natural disasters. In 2005, the Urban Transformation and Renewal policy of 5366 accelerated the urban renovation/developments and it gave power to the municipalities to declare any district as an urban transformation area and to control what property rights, urban planning and architectural projects could be applied.

According to architecture scholar Neyran Turan, notions of "urban renewal" as a critical component of ecological sustainability have gained prominence within urban planning discourse in Istanbul. In the words of Turan, "the 'ecological turn' of Istanbul is currently limited to specific managerial perspectives on urban governance—such as 'resource management,' 'environmental risk,' or 'urban renewal and transformation.'" A major argument for the demolition and "urban renewal" of Sulukule was to replace existing housing stock with purportedly more earthquake-resistant construction; however, the impetus behind the demolition was allegedly influenced by stigma towards its predominantly Romani inhabitants. Some critics have claimed that Renewal Policy 5366 is often selectively applied toward neighbourhoods with large minority or Romani populations. In a June 17, 2008 interview, Mustafa Ciftci, Sulukule Renewal Project Coordinator, stated

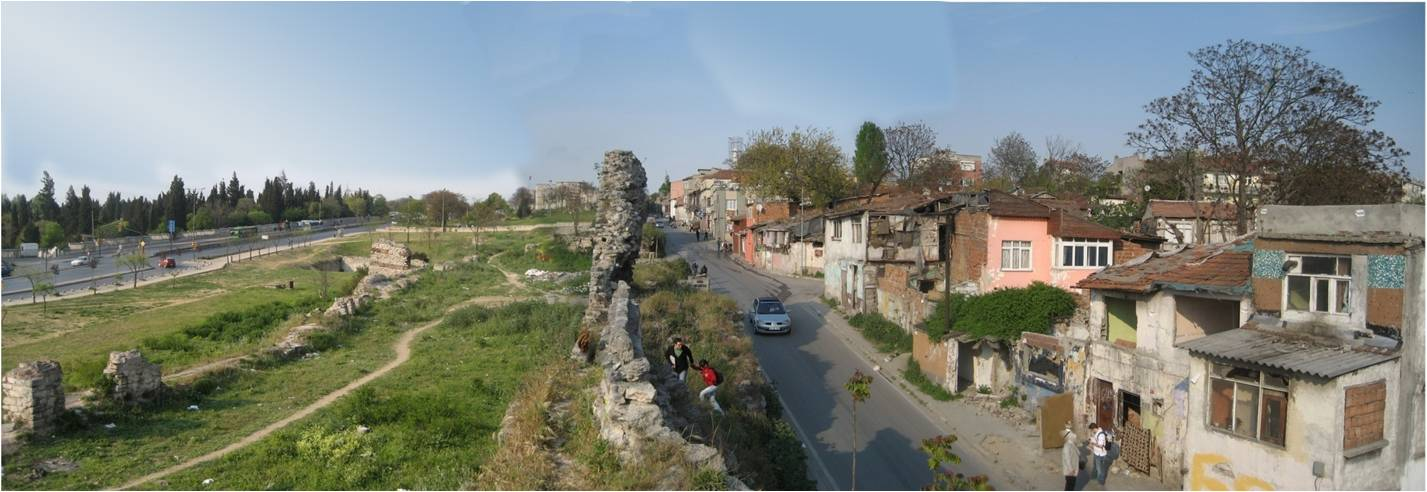
Sulukule prior to demolition

It is not easy to integrate these [Romani] people to society, but we have to accomplish it, in the end these are our people; we have to save them. If it was up to me, as a state policy, I would take all the kids under the age of ten from their parents, put them in boarding schools, educate them and make them members of society. This is the only way.

Evicted tenants were offered houses 48 kilometres away in Taşoluk, where high mortgage rates were unworkable for most residents, most of whom were low-income. According to Kıyak and Tan, "The renewal process as a whole has caused the disintegration of the community by dispersing the existing social fabric, their inability to continue their cultural activities, their severance from social networks of solidarity, and even graver livelihood problems." Without access to nearby medical care, education, or transportation to the city centre, the relocated residents left Taşoluk. Many returned to the former Sulukule district, currently renamed "Karagümrük", where they subsequently constructed shanties "on the ruins of their former homes", according to Demirovski and Marsh.

=== 1970 Bayramiç forestry dispute ===
According to Rahmi Ozel, the former attorney of Bayramiç, a series of violent attacks against the Romani community there took place between January 18 and February 22, 1970. Part of a larger conflict surrounding access to forest resources, the attacks were triggered by a dispute over ownership of a logging truck. While no one was killed in the attacks, the events caused significant terror among both Romani and non-Romani members of the community, and led to the expulsion of the Bayramiç Romani. Social and behavioral sciences scholar Gül Ӧzateşler has argued that the attacks, whose timing closely correlated to important dates in the logging industry season reflected insecurities about ethnic Turkish loss of power to Romani persons, who were gaining socioeconomic influence due to their role in the transportation sector of the forestry industry.

In the 1960s, forestry became an increasingly profitable industry in Turkey, as lumber consumption rapidly increased. Due to increased investment in forestry management and production, Turkey became recognized for its timber industry, to the extent that its supplies were viewed as competitive within a globalized international context. In 1963–1964, new mountain roads near Bayramiç were created to enable timber extraction, coupled with improvements in highway networks. On August 26, 1967, The Regional Administration of Forestry in Bayramiç city and the surrounding Bayramiç district was founded. At the time, 53.8% of provincial territory was covered by timber stands. As a result of these developments, employment in the forestry transportation sector increased from 30 individuals to 200 in Bayramiç during this time.

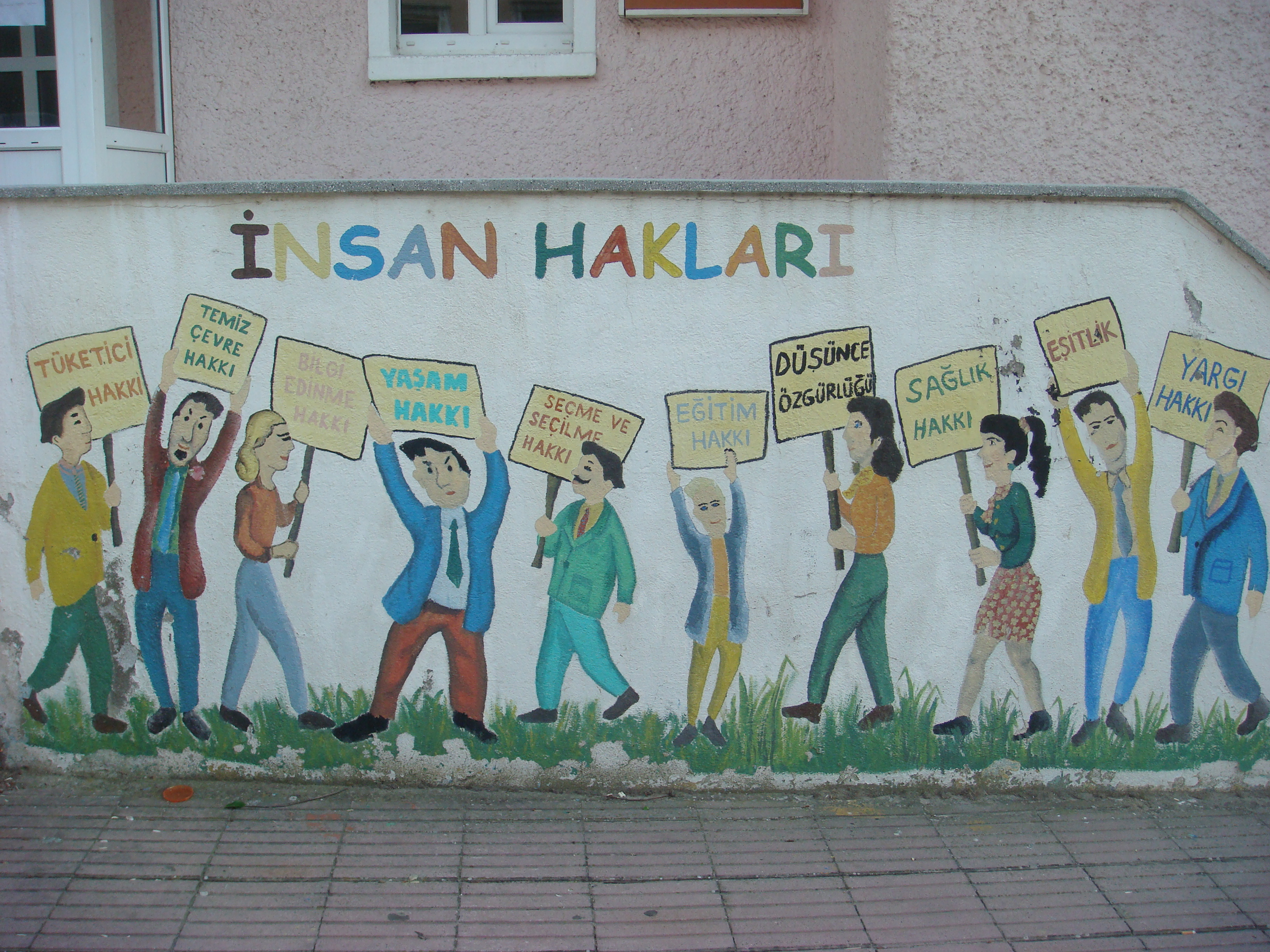
Mural describing human rights in Turkey, 2009. Exterior of public education building, Bayramiç

In Bayramiç, conflicts over the processing, handling, and transport of timber were commonplace among locals. According to Ӧzateşler, "The competition was especially acute, as at that time forestry offered the best jobs for many villagers and townspeople. It is no coincidence that the attacks on the Gypsies started in January and stopped at the end of February, before the annual start date of the forestry business in the town, in the month of March."

Few cars existed in the Bayramiç region during the 1950s and 1960s; for example, there were only five jeeps in the town during the late 1950s, and animals were used as primary means for transportation. During the late 1950s, timber was the primary economic product exported from the town, and by 1960, there were eight logging trucks stationed in the city. Romani people became involved in logging truck driving beginning in the late 1950s. According to Ӧzateşler, Romani people "became powerful in a prestigious position" by becoming logging truck drivers. According to one truck driver from the era, the driving profession was viewed as having higher prestige than a state official. Ӧzateşler states "it was not easy to find a good driver; experienced drivers therefore had a very strong bargaining position, including a high social status. They were said to be more prestigious even than their own bosses. They were treated as kings in the coffeehouses. When they came in, people would stand up and greet them." However, the reason for the success of Romani truck drivers was their willingness to work an extremely dangerous job. In the words of Ӧzateşler, "They were just doing the dirty job at that time; as it was very tiring and dangerous due to lack of proper roads to the mountain ... one was supposed to be a little mad to be a driver as the risks were considerable."

In 1970, a Leyland truck was purchased by a Romani family in partnership with an ethnic Turkish driver (who later helped start the attacks), and became subject of great interest. As a symbol of wealth, it also became a source of resentment toward the socio-economic success of the Romani community. According to Ӧzateşler, "All of the Gypsies mentioned the lorry as the object that triggered the attacks." One of the individuals responsible for orchestrating the attacks, Huseyin Kiltas, stated "What it came down to was the Leyland [logging truck]."

Following allegations against Romani truck drivers of sexual harassment toward non-Romani Turkish high school girls, a series of violent attacks took place against the Romani community of Bayramiç. The first attack targeted the muhacir sub-group of Romani, who were engaged in the logging truck driving industry. 38 houses were damaged. This attack then grew into a second assault against all Romani persons in the area, involving 3,000 individuals who stoned Romani houses and beat Romani residents. The crowd marched on the municipal building, which was located on the main avenue leading to the "neighbourhoods where the Gypsies lived". When the city's attorney attempted to stop the crowd, he was nearly beaten to death by a gang of 30–40 individuals. The Romani were subsequently forced to leave the city. Many Romani went into hiding, while individuals who employed Romani experienced threats. Some employers chose to risk their own safety and social status by protecting Romani people from the violence. Verbal threats of sexual assault were directed towards Romani women. According to Ӧzateşler

In cases of conflicts and war, the female body is often treated as an arena for masculine honor and prestige along with nationalistic territorial claims ... Gypsies making passes at Turkish girls was seen as a violation of the national border and the territory of Turkish men ... female agency was entirely lacking in this scenario. The actual attackers were men and the supposedly abused women remained anonymous; nobody knew anything about them not even whether they really existed or not.

From the perspective of Rana Kocayar, the oldest daughter of the Romani family that had purchased the logging truck, and Bidon Hilmi, a Romani truck driver at the time who was beaten during the violence, the allegations of sexual harassment were a means to cover the primary motives of the attacks, which were an attempt to prevent Romani people from participating in the forestry sector. The violence ended on February 22, 1970 when word spread that one of the key perpetrators, a logging truck driver named Halit Er, was in critical medical condition. His injuries had been caused during an altercation with Romani in Çanakkale, who attacked him due to his role provoking the Bayramiç attacks. Some Romani returned to Bayramiç in the following months and years, while others did not. To date, no one has been prosecuted for inciting or taking part in the violence.

== See also ==
- Aarhus Convention
- Environmentalism
- Indigenous peoples
- Kyshtym disaster
- Labour inspectorate
- Racism in Europe
- Social inequality
- Urban forest inequity
