= Sema Yildiz =

Turkish belly dancer and actress

Sema Yıldız
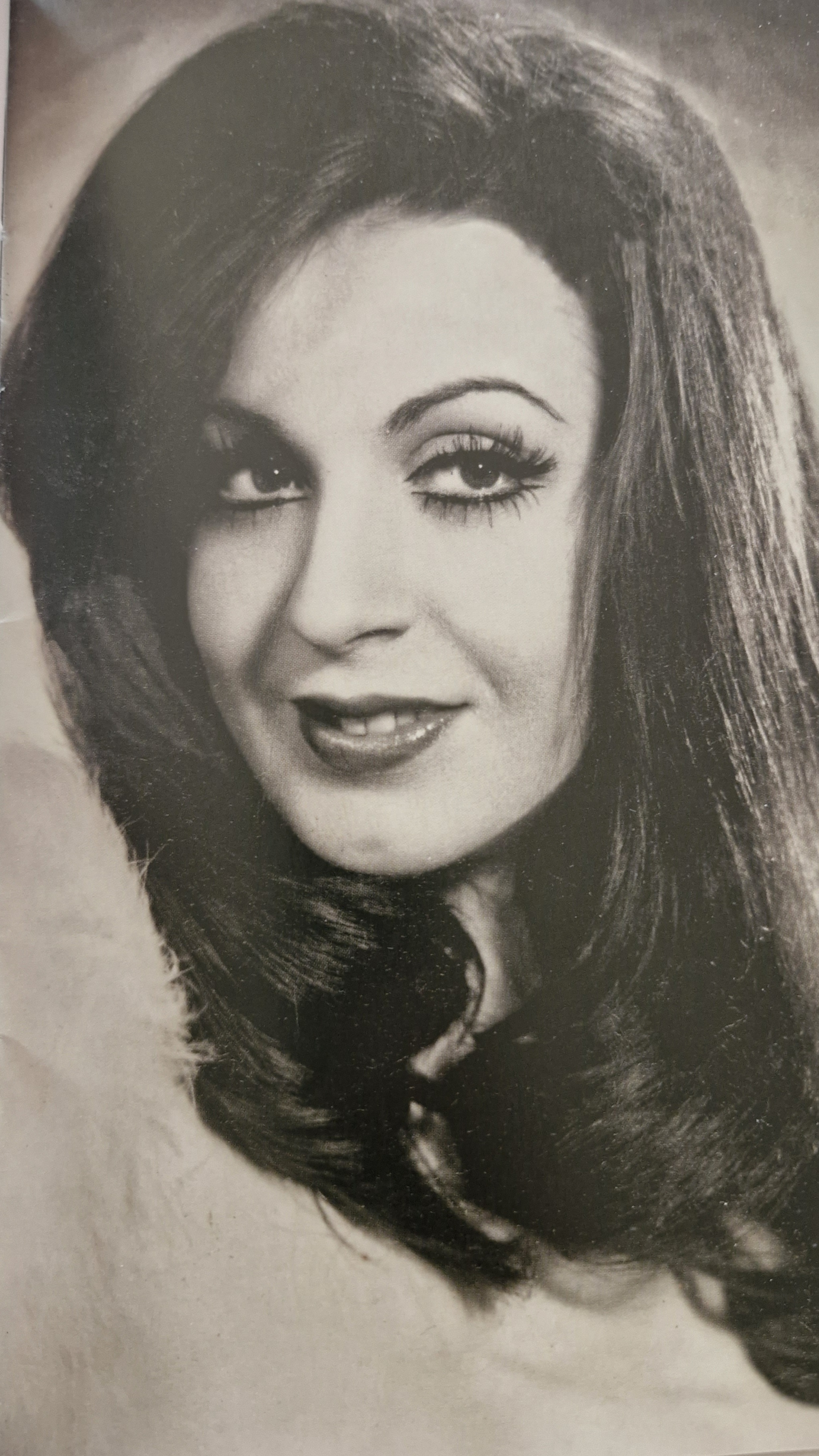
- Sema Yildiz portrait shot, early 1970's
- Born: Sulukule, Istanbul, Turkey
- Occupations: Belly dancer, actress; Romani dancer; dance teacher
- Years active: 1966-present

Sema Yıldız is a Turkish belly dancer and actress who is known as the first dancer to perform in the Ottoman era Topkapi palace. She has been referred to as "One of Turkey's senior oriental dancers". and is also known for her expertise in Romani dance.

== Early life ==
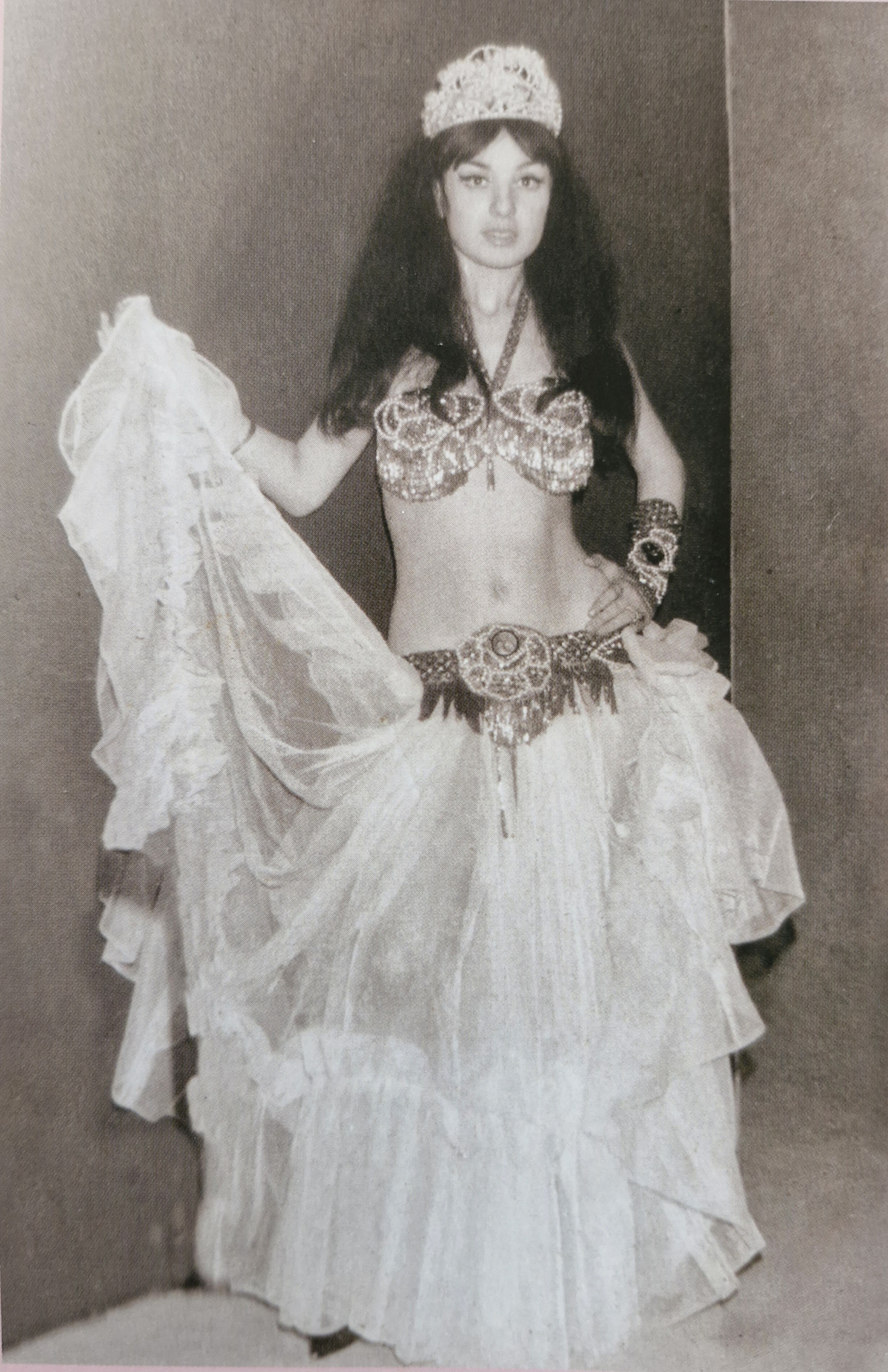
Sema_Yildiz_in_1967

Born in Istanbul to a farmer and the only girl of five children, she grew up in the Sulukule neighbourhood (Karagümrük). an area known as the world's first permanent Romani settlement. Her father was a migrant to Turkey from the Balkans. In 1967 she entered a dance competition (yarışma), known as "Queen of the Dance" at Caddebostan Casino, placing third. At this competition, Sema met a manager, Engin Arınmış, would help develop her career.

In 1968, Sema danced for classical Turkish singer Zeki Müren at the Bebek Maksim Casino in Beşiktaş.

== Career ==
In 1973, Sema began to perform at musical halls and dinner clubs around Istanbul for two decades. These included Karevanserai, Bebek Maksim, Gar Music Hall, Galata Kullesi (Galata Tower), Maksim in Taksim square, Yildiz Casino, Halikarnas, and Les Parisiennes.

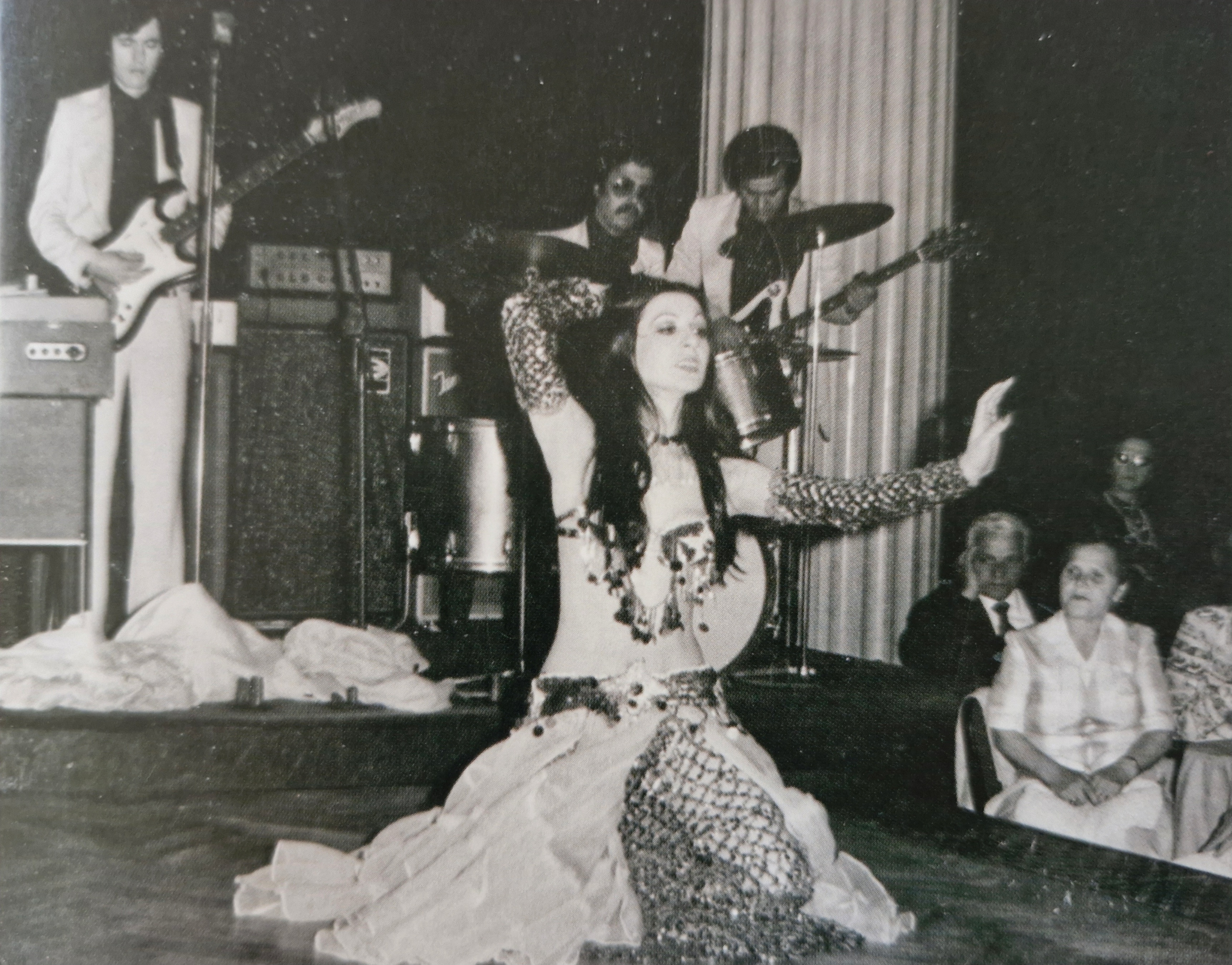
Sema_Yildiz_performing_her_famous_floor_work

The American dancer and teacher Magana Baptiste brought her students to Istanbul on a multi-country dance tour that same year. After watching Sema perform live in Istanbul, Magana requested that she and her students do a class, and Sema obliged. The experience was Sema's first teaching opportunity.

"With flowing waist length black hair, fluidly graceful arms, powerful shimmies and unforgettable smile, Sema Yildiz is Turkish Oryantal incarnate, embodying the passion, dexterity, skill and emotion of this wonderful dance form. She dances like a whirlwind, beautifully and with incredible energy. Fixing her audience with her queenly gaze she draws each individual in to her performance. Sema commands attention as a dancer and her audiences are rewarded with her rippling veil work, ringing zills, floor undulations, sweeping turns, dramatic hair flicks and pulsating stomach accents".

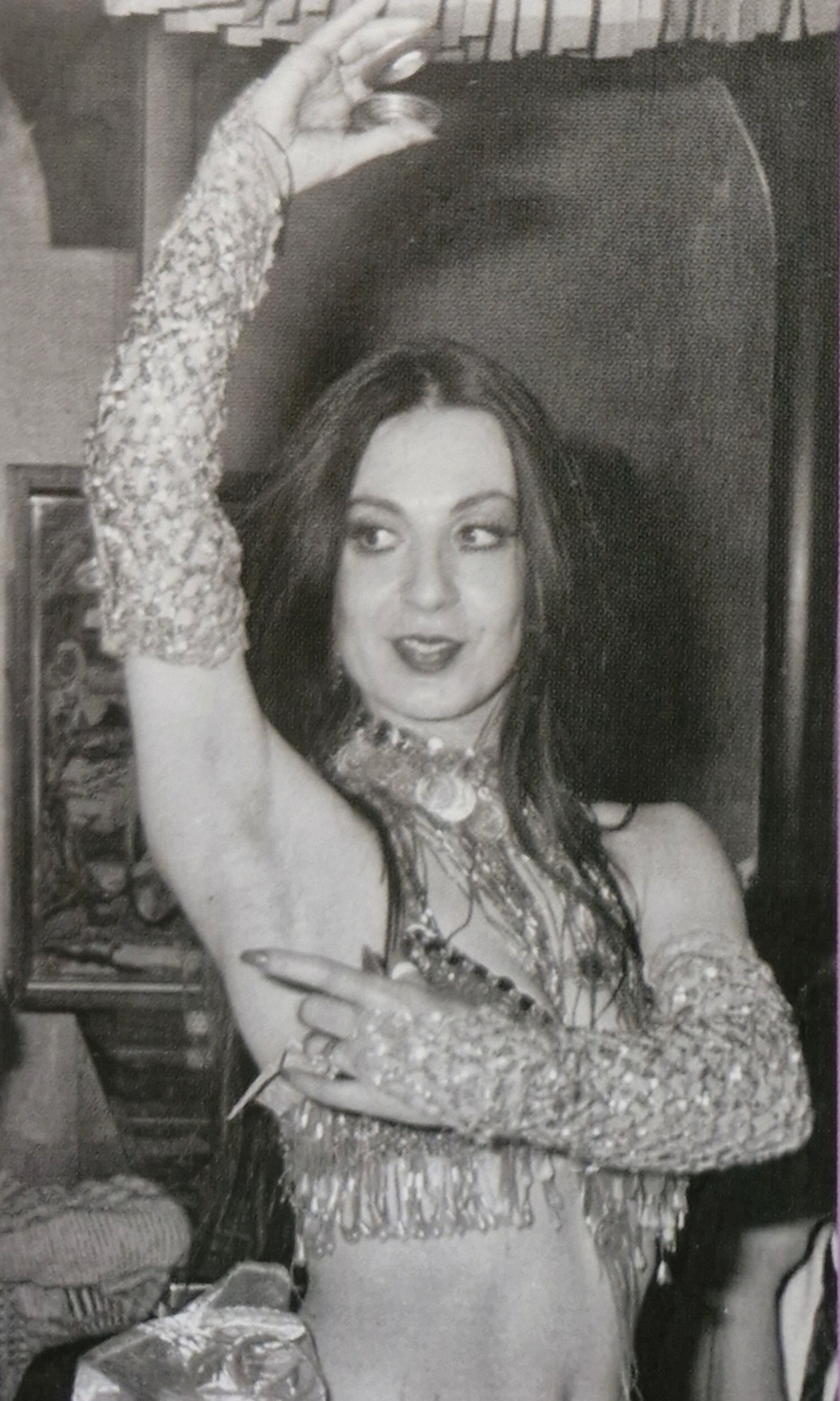
Sema_Yildiz_1980's

In 1976, she embarked on a 3-month working tour of Beirut, Amman, Syria and Iran. As part of this tour, Sema performed in Khormashah, Iran, alongside Belly dancer and actress Nadia Gamal from Egypt, and Iranian actress, cabaret performer, and dancer Jamileh. She moved to Belgium in 1979, where her agent had sent her at the time, and lived there until 1988, visiting a total of 14 European countries to perform. One city she performed in was London, where she danced at the Gallipoli Club and met American singer and actress Eartha Kitt.

Sema retired from performing in 1993, to focus on teaching, mentoring and being an agent for new dancers. In 2005, Sema was featured in a Japanese television documentary titled "Queens of Dance", filmed at the Çırağan Palace in Istanbul, alongside dancers Princess Banu and Birgul Berai. She collaborated with Turkish musical group Baba Zula in 2006, performing at venues around Istanbul together. That same year was the first time Sema visited Japan, doing a dance tour; giving workshops and performances. She was the first Turkish-style Belly dancer to visit the country and promote the style and Romani dance there. She was interviewed by NHK for a documentary about Belly dance, Sulukule and Istanbul.

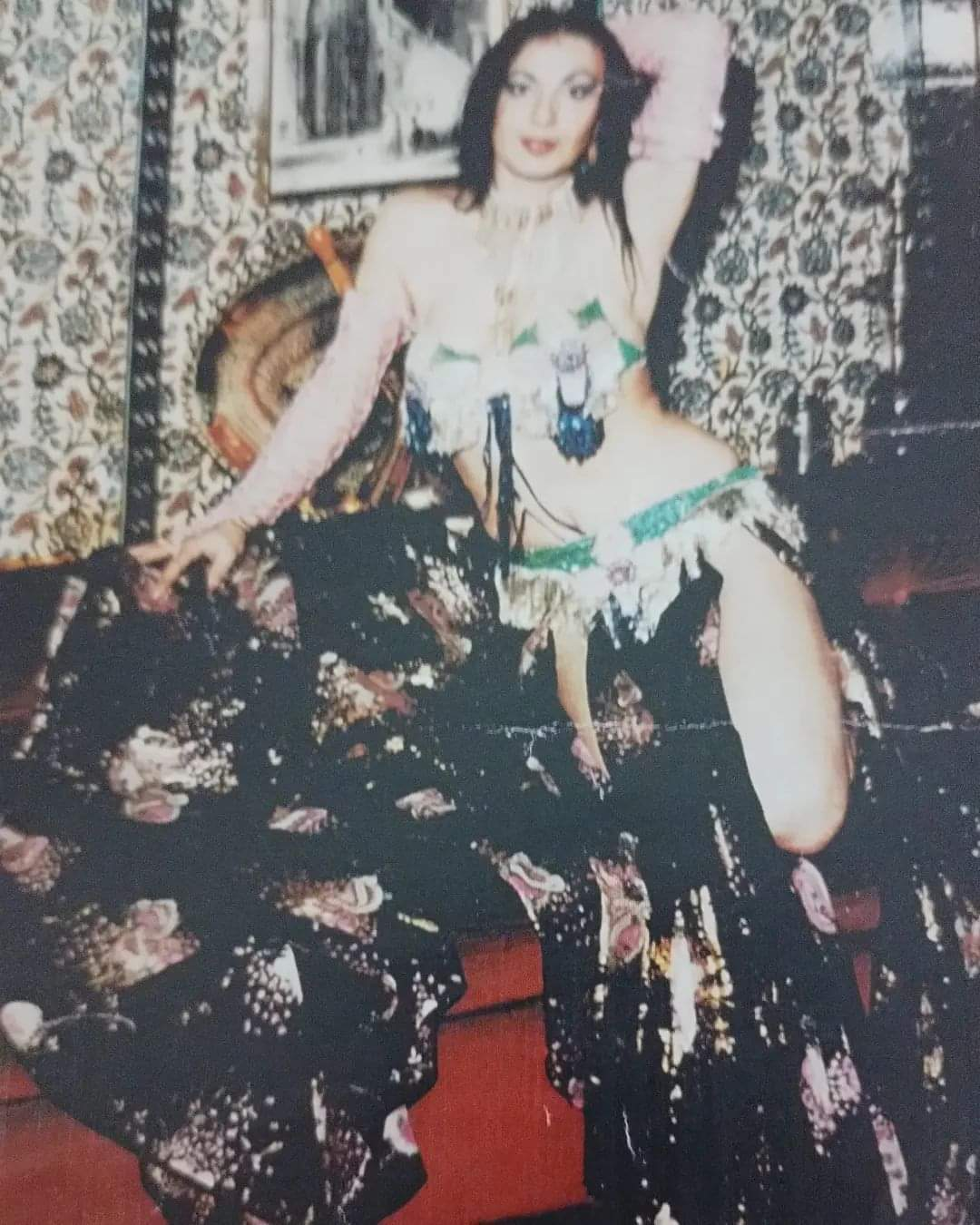
Sema_Yildiz_Gallipoli

In 2007, she continued her collaboration with Baba Zula and went on tour with them. This included performing in Istanbul, at the 52nd International Art Exhibition Venice Biennale in Italy, at in Ghent, Belgium and in Bremen, Germany. Together, Baba Zula and Sema appeared on Turkish television. In 2009, Sema appeared in a documentary about Turkish Oryantal and cooking with Japanese pop singer, actress and former radio host Takako Uehara. She is featured in the documentary film "The Magical Call of Oryantal" (2007), directed by Umut Egitimci.

She was invited to attended the International Belly dance Conference in Canada in 2010, giving workshops and performing. She worked alongside choreographers and dance teachers including Mahmoud Reda. The following year, Sema's portrait was taken by photographer Ahmet Sel, and was featured at his "Oriental Illusions" photographic exhibition at Pi Artworks in Istanbul.

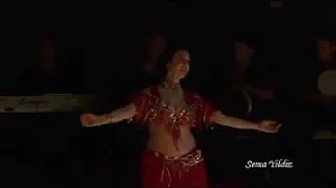
Sema_Yildiz_Youtube_Video

In 2012, the Brazilian series "Mundo em Movimento" (World in Movement) interviewed Sema in the episode "Dances of Turkey". She was interviewed about her dance life and Belly dance, and also did a performance.

In 2012, Sema travelled to the USA as guest teacher to give workshops and perform at the 'Bad Boys of Belly dance' festival in Las Vegas, and also became the artistic co-organiser of Turkey's largest Oriental Dance festival: Tarazade, held in Istanbul. She held that position for two years until 2013. Turkish Director Cemalettin Irken invited Sema to perform in a short cultural documentary film made by TRT Belgesel. The film was titled "Bir Nergis, Bir Leblebi, Bir Ayvalık" (A Daffodil, A chickpea, One Ayvalik) and released in October 2017. Sema also appeared on Romanian Television the following year, on the talk show "Teo Show".

In 2023, Sema was featured in a book about Belly dance history titled "Danza Oriental en Egipto" (Oriental Dance in Egypt), by Giselle Rodriguez. Sema was described as being one of the stars of Oriental Dance in Turkey, and as having introduced Didem (belly dancer) to the owner of Sultanas restaurant where she performed.

== Dance philosophy ==
"All my life I have devoted my heart and soul to dance, to learning to dance and teaching dance. Dance is the great love of my life, I live and feed on it. No matter how tired I am, when I go on stage I forget everything, it's like entering a trance state. Dance for me is something like a prayer and music is my doctor. I feel like a plane tree and my students are my branches".

== Partial filmography and television appearances ==
- 1970 Müthiş Türk, Belly Dance role. Directed by Nuri Ergün.
- 1976 Kime Niyet Kime Kismet, Small acting role. Directed by Tamer Oguz.
- 2005 Queens of Oriental, Documentary as herself (Japan).
- 2007 The Magical Call of Oryantal. Directed by Umut Egitimci.
- 2012 Mundo em Movimento - Dances of Turkey episode (Brazilian Documentary series), as herself.
- 2017 Bir Nergis, Bir Leblebi, Bir Ayvalık (One Daffodil, One chickpea, One Ayvalik). Directed by Cemalettin Irken.

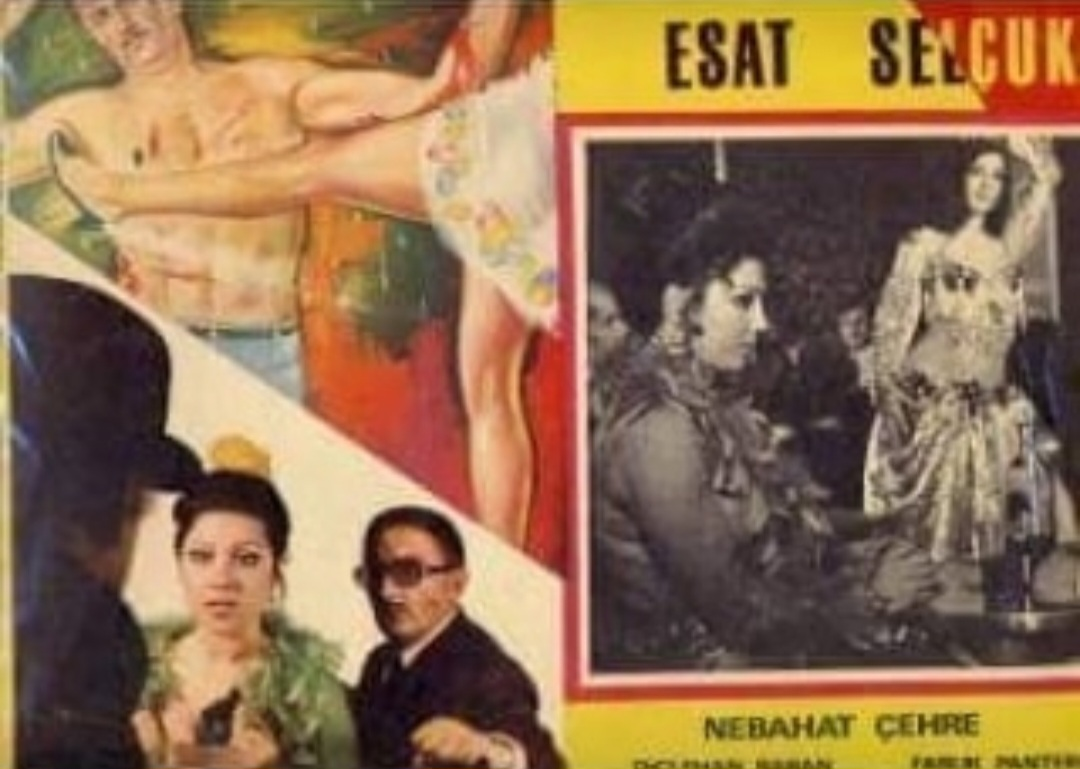
SemaMoviePoster

== Legacy ==
Sema is well known for her zill (finger cymbal) playing, and is known as a dynamic dancer with strong hip movements and powerful floor work. She has been described as being compelling every time she dances.

Sema was the first Turkish Dancer to be invited to teach in Egypt by Belly Dance choreographer and teacher Raqia Hassan in 2001, teaching and performing at the Ahlan Wa Sahlan festival in Cairo. Apart from Egypt, she was also the first Turkish teacher in Japan and has taught extensively there, training many students on various trips to Japan, as well as many Japanese students visiting her in Istanbul.

Sema still actively teachers and travels to give workshops, and is involved in efforts to help Sulukule Romani people who have been displaced due to an urban renewal project; which threatened their way of life.

Her legacy is seen in her many students around the world. As part of teaching them, Sema has given many of her students Turkish names. In Turkey Sema has been the teacher, mentor and trainer to well known dancers Asena and Didem (belly dancer).
