= Kinali =

Kinali may refer to:

- Didem (belly dancer) (Didem Kinali, born 1986), Turkish belly dancer
- Selahattin Kınalı (born 1978), Turkish footballer
- Eren Kinali, English footballer
- Kınalı Kar, Turkish drama television series
