= Kudret Sandra =

Turkish dancer

Kudret Şandra
- Born: December 12, 1932; Üsküdar, Istanbul, Turkey
- Died: January 9, 2020 (aged 87); Istanbul, Turkey
- Occupations: Dancer; actor; dance instructor

Kudret Şandra (born *Kudret Sulatası*; 12 December 1932 – 9 January 2020) was a Turkish dancer, actor, and dance instructor. He was one of the few male belly dancers in Turkey to gain prominence in the traditionally female-dominated art of belly dancing, known locally as "zenne" or "köçek" dancing.

== Early life and education ==
Şandra was born in Üsküdar, Istanbul, to Hikmet Bey, a chief at the Maritime Bank, and Fatma Hanım, a homemaker. At the age of 14, he expressed his desire to leave school, leading to a cessation of financial support from his father. At 18, he moved to Beyoğlu, Istanbul, to pursue his passion for dance. He sought mentorship from the renowned dancer Emine Adalet Pee, who agreed to train him despite initial reservations about the prospects for male dancers in Turkey. Under her guidance, Şandra honed his skills and began performing professionally at the age of 16.

== Career ==
In 1948, Şandra made his film debut in the lead role of Çıldıran Baba, directed by Vedat Örfi Bengü. Over his career, he appeared in more than 50 films, composed music, and recorded several records.

Şandra was also a dedicated dance instructor, teaching many prominent Turkish actors and actresses, including Ayhan Işık, Filiz Akın, Türkan Şoray, Nazan Şoray, Hülya Koçyiğit, Fatma Girik, Leyla Sayar, Suzan Avcı, Sevda Ferdağ, Figen Say, Mine Soley, and Devlet Devrim. He also taught foreign artists such as Helen Chanel, Margreth Lee, and Sabina.

Known for his expressive style and technical proficiency, Şandra's performances in the 1960s and 1970s contributed to the popularization of male belly dancing in Turkey. He was often referred to as "the man who made Turkey belly dance."

== Later life ==
In 1978, at the age of 46, Şandra retired from dancing and underwent a personal transformation, becoming a follower of a religious order. He performed the Hajj pilgrimage, grew a beard, and adopted an Islamic lifestyle. He authored two books: Yeşilçam'dan Kâbe'ye (From Yeşilçam to the Kaaba) in 1985 and Büyünün Esirleri - Şifa Reçeteleri (Prisoners of Magic - Healing Recipes) in 1987.

== Death ==
Şandra died on 9 January 2020 in Istanbul at the age of 88 due to heart failure and diabetes. His funeral was held on 10 January 2020 at Maltepe Küçükyalı Kılavuz Çayırı Mosque, and he was buried in Istanbul.

== Selected filmography ==
- Çıldıran Baba (1948)
- Kadın Berberi (1964)
- Dişi Örümcek (1964)
- Şoför Nebahat Bizde Kabahat (1965)
- Ateş Gibi Kadın (1965)
- Seher Vakti (1966)
- Kader Bağı (1967)
- Can Pazarı (1968)
- Azize (1968)
- Avanta Kemal Torpido Yılmaza Karşı (1968)
- Benim De Kalbim Var (1968)
- Mini Etekli Kızlar (1969)
- Kaplan Kadın Dehşet Adası (1972)
