= Tülay Karaca =

Turkish belly dancer

- Occupation: Belly dancer
- Years active: 1975–1999
- Known for: Turkish Oryantal Dans

Tülay Karaca is a Turkish belly dancer who gained widespread fame in the 1980s and 1990s for her commanding stage presence, precise technique with finger cymbals (zills), and prominent television appearances. She is considered one of the leading figures in the golden era of Turkish Oryantal dans (Oriental dance).

== Early life and rise to fame ==
Karaca began her professional dance career in the late 1970s, quickly drawing public attention for her expressive performances and dynamic interpretation of the 9/8 Turkish Romani rhythm. By the end of the decade, she was listed among Turkey's most in-demand belly dancers, along with Seher Şeniz and Nesrin Topkapı.

== Career highlights ==
Throughout the 1980s, Karaca became a familiar figure on Turkish national television, especially during the annual New Year's Eve broadcasts on TRT. In its 1987–88 and 1989–90 programs, Karaca performed alongside dancers such as Nilüfer Öz and Burçin Orhon in live televised galas that were broadcast nationwide. Her appearances on these prestigious broadcasts established her as one of the country's top dance entertainers.

Beyond television, Karaca was a fixture in Istanbul's nightclub scene. In an interview with Hürriyet, entertainers reminisced about the legendary venues of the era, naming her among the headline performers who shared stages with icons such as Huysuz Virjin and Öztürk Serengil.

Karaca's style was defined by sharp isolations, dramatic spins, and complex cymbal patterns. Her costumes typically featured bold colors and metallic embellishments that enhanced the theatricality of her shows. She often danced to live orchestras, improvising closely with the darbuka, oud, or kanun.

== Media coverage and recognition ==
Karaca remained a popular name well into the 1990s and was often cited in Turkish press. A 1990 Cumhuriyet article recounts a public performance where famed Turkish footballer Rüştü Reçber danced alongside Karaca on stage, imitating her movements and delighting the audience.

In 2023, dance historian Giselle Rodriguez cited Karaca in her bilingual book Danza Oriental en Egipto, noting: “Other Turkish belly dance (Oryantal) stars include Tülay Karaca.”

A retrospective published in Cosmopolitan Türkiye in April 2025 listed Karaca as one of the “most beloved dancers of the late 1980s,” recalling her acclaimed 1988–89 New Year’s Eve performance on TRT.

== Legacy ==
Tülay Karaca is remembered as one of the defining performers of Turkish belly dance’s modern theatrical era. Her contribution to the art form, particularly in televised and live cabaret contexts, helped shape the stylistic identity of Oryantal dans in Turkey. Her work continues to influence Turkish dancers and remains part of the country’s performance heritage.
