= Seher Şeniz =

Turkish actress, belly dancer and model

- Born: Seher Başdaş; March 1, 1948; Narlıdere, İzmir, Turkey
- Died: May 14, 1992 (aged 44); Istanbul, Turkey
- Resting place: Feriköy Cemetery, Istanbul
- Occupations: Actress, belly dancer, model

Seher Şeniz (born Seher Başdaş; 1 March 1948 – 14 May 1992) was a Turkish actress, belly dancer, and photo model. She rose to fame in the 1960s and 1970s and was widely regarded as one of the leading dancers in Turkey alongside Tülay Karaca and Nesrin Topkapı.

== Career ==
Şeniz first gained public attention in 1965 when she won the "Beach Beauty" competition where Seyyal Taner placed third. In 1966, she secured second place in the Miss Turkey pageant but became infamous for angrily throwing her runner-up sash at the jury. Her film debut came with Kelle Koltukta (1962), and she appeared in more than 20 films, many of which followed the adventure or erotic themes popular at the time. Notably, she starred opposite Yılmaz Güney in the 1965 film Tehlikeli Adam. Despite her talent, her striking beauty often led her to be cast in femme fatale roles. She was married three times, first at the age of 16 in İzmir, then to an American, Anthony Wilkins, and later to her Armenian husband Teknur Kiraz, with whom she settled in Paris. While in France, she performed in renowned strip clubs such as the Moulin Rouge, and became the first Turkish woman to be featured in Playboy magazine. Upon returning to Turkey, she focused on belly dancing and performed in major nightclubs and venues in Istanbul, including Parizien.

== Death ==
On 29 June 1984, Şeniz attempted suicide by ingesting four tubes of Mogadon but survived after long medical intervention. In 1992, she made a second attempt at her home in Teşvikiye, this time consuming hundreds of morphine pills and two bottles of whiskey. Her body was found by her brother, Turhan Başdaş, after neighbors alerted police. She left behind a suicide note in which she wrote: "I already understood what kind of people existed in this disgusting world when I was only 15… I was not born to be a prostitute. I am sensitive and emotional. Don't let anyone know I'm dead. Burn my wigs and scatter the ashes. I do not want a Muslim funeral. Wrap me in a white bathrobe and cover me completely. That's enough." Her wishes were reportedly not fulfilled. Following her death, several prominent Turkish columnists such as Mehmet Altan, Hasan Pulur, and İlhan Selçuk wrote tributes. Seher Şeniz, along with Mine Mutlu and Feri Cansel, came to be seen as part of the "tragic trio" of Turkish erotic cinema.

== Selected filmography ==
- Kelle Koltukta (1962)
- Aşkım ve Günahım (1963)
- Tehlikeli Adam (1965)
- İstanbul Dehşet İçinde (1966)
- Ümit Kurbanları (1966)
- Kurt Kanı (1970)
- Koreli Kemal (1970)
- Fırtına Adam (1970)
- Aşk Arzu Silah (1970)
- Kendim Ettim Kendim Buldum (1970)
- Gölgedeki Adam (1970)
- Del-haye Bi-aram (1971, Iran)
- Kaplan Tuzağı (1971)
- Katiller (1971)
- İki Yosmaya Bir Kurşun (1971)
- Tarkan: Viking Kanı (1971)
- Katerina 72 (1972)
- Muz Sever Misin (1975)
- Kader Yolcuları (1975)
- Halkalı Şeker (1975)
- Kadınlara Dayanamam (1976)
- Su Perisi Elması (1976)
- Uyanıklar Dünyası (1985)
