= Terezka Drnzik =

Terezka Drnzik is one of the matriarch figures in the Australian bellydancing community, having started the first dedicated bellydance studio in Sydney in 1989. The school has produced many professional dancers including Jrisi Jusakos of Hathor Dance and Kaeshi Chai of Bellydance Superstars.

Of Czechoslovak/New Zealand descent, Terezka was introduced to bellydancing when she arrived in Australia in 1979 and saw Rozeta Ahalyea performing in a Greek nightclub. Terezka approached Rozetta who took her under her wing.

In 1980 Terezka lived in a household with three Arabic families, absorbing their tradition and culture. She was influenced by the stars of the 1930s to the 1950s and considers Soheir Zaki, who was prominent in the 1970s, as her greatest teacher — even though they never met.

Turning professional in 1981 Terezka was given the Arabic name of "Leila" (Night). She regularly performed seven shows per night and quickly established herself as one of three top performers in Sydney. This was a time when Arabic food, clubs and restaurants were in their heyday, with the influx of Arabs to Australia due to the Lebanese Civil War.

In 1982 Terezka performed with the renowned Egyptian Baladi singer Ahmed Adaweyah and the famed composer and piano accordion player Hussan Abou Seoud and his orchestra from Paris. As a result, she was offered a contract in Paris, where she performed six nights a week at Vildizler, La Lampe d'Aladin and Al Badiya as well as at numerous functions for the upper echelons of Paris. Contracts followed in London (at the Omar Khyaam performing alongside Mona Sayeed) as well as Belgium, Spain, and Morocco and Tunisia.

Terezka returned to Australia to open Sydney’s first full-time Middle Eastern dance studio. Her mission was to present Arabic dance in an intelligent and sensitive way, staying true to the cultural aspects.

Terezka aimed to present the dance form to the Arabic community in a way that hadn't been seen before, incorporating traditional group dances as well as cabaret and contemporary in full theatrical performance. Her shows included group dances presenting contemporary (Pharaonic) pieces, traditional Beledi, Saidi and Khaleegy and stunning soloists with an emphasis on Arabic interpretation, technique and spirit in movement and performance skills.

Terezka's Academy of Danse Orientale is now one of the pre-eminent schools in Sydney. One of her innovations is classes and workshops accompanied by live musicians, a rare opportunity for dancers at intermediate and advanced levels to experience live musical accompaniment.

In 1991 Terezka hosted an evening with live musicians for the first Bellydance-a-thon, an event that turned into the annual Sydney Middle Eastern Dance Festival.

In 1992 Terezka retired from performance on the Arabic nightclub and restaurant circuit.

In 2006 Terezka was Australia's representative teacher at the Cairo Dance Festival.

Terezka has now set up a charity call Make a Child Smile, which sponsors children from developing nations. The charity’s main fundraising events are gala bellydancing balls.
