= Serena Wilson =

American dancer

- Born: Serene Blake; August 8, 1933; New York City
- Died: June 17, 2007 (aged 73)
- Occupation(s): Dancer, teacher, choreographer, lecturer, author.
- Known for: Breaking ground for the art of belly dancing in the United States.
- Spouse: Alan "Rip" Wilson
- Children: 1

Serena Wilson (August 8, 1933 – June 17, 2007), often known just as "Serena", was a well-known dancer, choreographer, and teacher who helped popularize belly dance in the United States. Serena's work also helped legitimize the dance form and helped it to be perceived as more than burlesque or stripping. Serena danced in clubs in her younger years, opened her own studio, hosted her own television show, founded her own dance troupe, and was the author of several books about belly dance.

== Early years ==
Serena was born Serene Blake in 1933 in New York's Bronx. Her parents were vaudeville performers with their own show, Blake & Blake, featuring a variety of comedy and musical numbers, some of which Serena performed in as a child. As a young adult, Serena officially changed her name from "Serene" to "Serena".

Serena also began studying with famed dancer Ruth St. Denis, well known for her interpretations of Oriental and Oriental-style dance. In 1952, Serena married Alan (Rip) Wilson, a musician, percussionist, and leader of a Dixieland band, a combination which complemented Serena's own background. In the mid-1950s, Serena gave birth to their son, Scott.

Not long after their marriage, Rip's band was booked for a gig with a Middle Eastern theme that required a belly dancer. In spite of the clash of styles, Rip quickly got hold of the music for popular Middle Eastern standards like Misirlou, and recruited his wife to dance, which Serena felt her studies with St. Denis had prepared her for.

According to her husband, Serena's dance ended up being rather awkward, as she wasn't sure what to do with her hands. She disguised this by carrying a vase on her shoulder throughout! The performance was nonetheless a success, inspiring Serena and Rip to pursue a lifelong interest in Middle Eastern music and dance.

Rip took up Middle Eastern drumming and frequently accompanied Serena as she honed her skills dancing at the Egyptian Gardens club in Chelsea, an area then known colloquially as Greektown for the large number of Greek and Middle Eastern cabarets lining the street. Soon, Serena had become one of the most popular belly dancers in the city and even performed for various city officials.

== Middle years ==
In the mid-1960s, Serena began teaching belly dance, opening Serena Studios, on Eighth Avenue in New York City. In the 1970s she started her own TV show, known as Serena and The Serena Show, which served as a means of educating the masses about belly dancing and billed itself as "The fun way to beauty, grace, and a youthful figure."

Her son, Scott, continued the family tradition by dedicating himself to the study of the oud, an Egyptian lute or guitar. Serena began writing the first two of her books about belly dance, The Serena Technique of Belly Dancing and The Belly Dance Book.

Serena and Rip's success continued unabated until the Gulf War in 1991, when American attitudes toward all things Middle Eastern soured.

== Later years ==
In spite of the bias in American popular culture against the Middle East, Serena continued to perform in a number of Egyptian folkloric shows and appeared several times as the lead dancer in the New York Opera Company's production of Aida. She also continued teaching at her studio and choreographing for her troupe, Serena Dance Theater, which performed throughout New York City.

Serena's studio provided dancers for hire, with dancers available for performances at traditional Middle Eastern weddings and other social events. Notably, in keeping with Serena's long-held belief that belly dancing was not comparable with stripping and erotic dance, her studio would not provide dancers for events in which their performance might be over-sexualized, e.g., for bachelorette parties but not bachelor parties, for bat mitzvahs but not bar mitzvahs.

In June 2007, Serena died suddenly of a pulmonary embolism. She had been scheduled to dance in Greenwich Village with her son's Middle Eastern band, Scott Wilson and Efendi, that very night. Her husband, son, and daughter-in-law continue to carry on her passion for Middle Eastern music and dance. Serena's studio in New York continues to hold classes and provide dancers for performances.

== See also ==
- Women in dance

== Sources ==
- Fox, Margalit. "Serena Wilson Dies at 73; Popularized Belly Dance." The New York Times: June 24, 2007.
- Serena Studios: About Serena.
