= Romani dance =

Dances of the Romani people

Romani dance in Slovenia

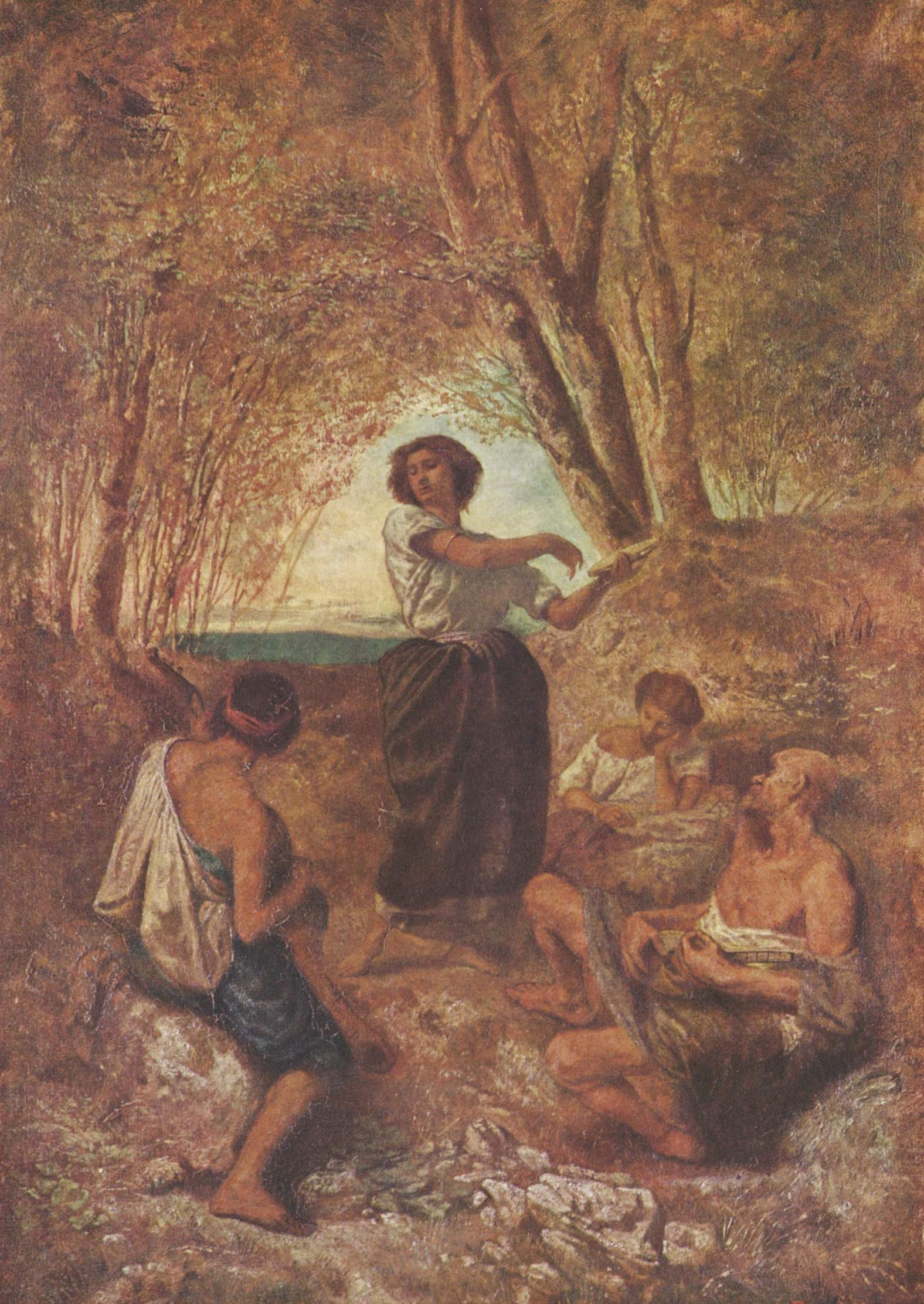
Romani dancer in Germany, painted by Anselm Feuerbach in 1853

This is a list of dances of the Romani people.

The most prominent Gypsy dance styles are those amongst the Roma in the Balkans. The Sulukule district in Istanbul is famous for its Romani dances. Prominent Romani dances in Western Europe include the flamenco dance, the traditional dance from Andalusia in Southern Spain. The Roma in Wales were also renowned for their distinctive style of dance, most notably for their rendition of clog dancing.

After leaving India, the Romani people spread across the world, with many settling in various European countries. As eternal nomads, they traveled through different regions before reaching Europe, which is why their dance incorporates elements from Persian, Celtic, Balkan, Indian, Arabic, and many other cultures. Romani dance is vibrant, energetic, and captivating, reflecting the traditions, nomadic lifestyle, and spirit of freedom of the Romani people. The music accompanying the dance is played on local instruments that have evolved over the centuries. Romani dance is known for its improvisation, freedom, energy, and passion. Because the Roma historically settled in many different countries, several distinct styles of Romani dance have developed, influenced by the local cultures and creativity of the Romani communities. Today, Romani dance styles differ from country to country, featuring wide, flowing skirts, shoulder shakes, tap and intricate footwork from Russia; body clapping from Hungary; and hip movements from Romania, Greece, Turkey, and regions further east.

== Balkans/Southeastern Europe ==
- Botoló, a stick dance using weapons
- Čoček, a dance originating from Ottoman military bands that was later adopted by Roma in the Balkans
- Romani csárdás
- Romani havasi, an adaption of havasi popular in East Thrace, a Turkish folk dance with the main base and elements of Byzantine music.
- Romani Kolo

== Western Europe ==
- Flamenco
- Romani clog dancing, an adaption of clog dancing, primarily performed by the Roma in Wales

== Russia ==
Russian Romani dance is characterized by gradual speed-up of music and movements. Female dance includes wide hand waves with the skirt and shoulder shakes ("shimmy"). Male dance traditionally includes complex tap dance and patting knees, shoulders, and hips.

== See also ==
- Romani music
- Romani culture
