= Nesrin Topkapı =

Turkish belly dancer

- Born: Nesrin Gökkaya; 1951 (age 74–75); Akhisar, Manisa Province, Turkey
- Occupation: Belly dancer
- Years active: 1968–1984

Nesrin Topkapı (born Nesrin Gökkaya; 1951) is a Turkish belly dancer. She is widely known as the first belly dancer to perform on TRT, Turkey’s national television broadcaster, marking a cultural milestone in the 1980s.

== Early life ==
Topkapı was born in Akhisar, Manisa Province. Her mother, Rabia Gökkaya, was also a dancer, and taught her the art of belly dance from a young age. She also received basic ballet training. At age six, she performed on stage in a casino in Adana, but the performance caused controversy due to her age, and the venue was shut down by authorities. She lost her father when she was 15 and worked in various jobs to support her family. In 1968, she moved to London and began performing as a belly dancer in nightclubs under the stage name "Nesrin Topkapı".

== Career ==
Returning to Turkey in 1974, she performed at the Maksim Casino in Istanbul during a gala in honor of the Shah of Iran, Mohammad Reza Pahlavi. She quickly became one of Turkey’s most sought-after belly dancers of the 1970s, alongside Tülay Karaca and Seher Şeniz. In 1980, she became the first belly dancer to appear live on TRT during a New Year’s Eve broadcast. She continued to perform in the 1981 and 1982 New Year specials. In 1984, she refused to participate in the program, reportedly declining to share the stage with less-experienced dancers.

== Style ==
Topkapı's style blended classical Turkish “oryantal” technique with influences from ballet. She was known for her elegant stage presence, refined isolations, soft arm movements, and expressive facial control. Her costumes reflected the glamorous cabaret era of the 1970s, often featuring richly beaded bras, high-slit skirts, and flowing veils.

== Teaching and legacy ==
After retiring from professional performance, she became a mentor to many artists. She taught belly dance to well-known performers such as Hadise, Sertab Erener, Nurgül Yeşilçay, and Nil Karaibrahimgil. She also gave lessons at dance academies in Istanbul and remained active in cultural discussions around the legitimacy of belly dance in Turkish performing arts.
