= Özel Türkbaş =

Turkish-born actress, model, singer, and dancer

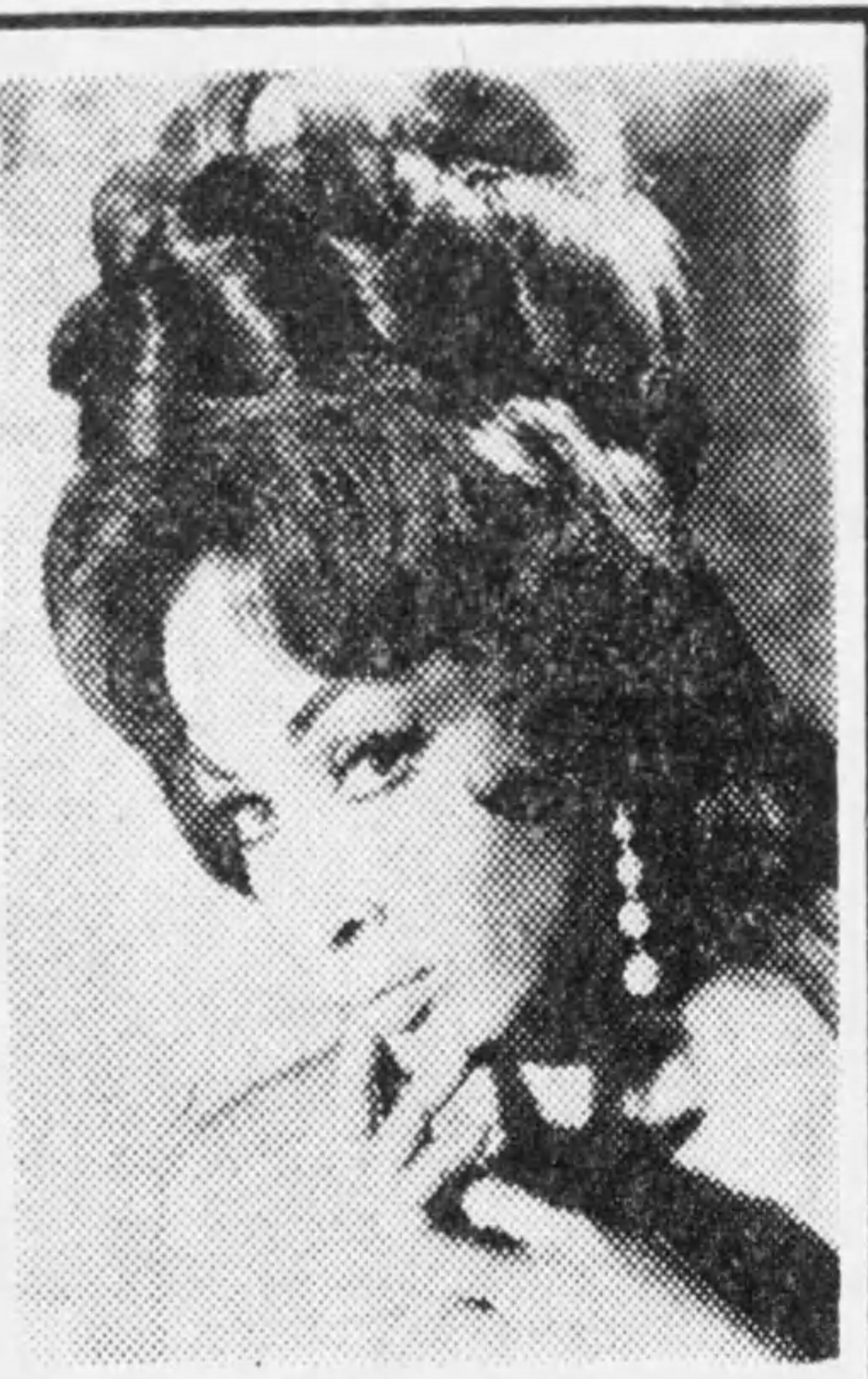
- Born: September 1, 1938; Manisa, Turkey
- Died: July 22, 2012 (aged 73); New York City, U.S.
- Occupation(s): Actress, model, singer, belly dancer

Özel Türkbaş (September 1, 1938 – July 22, 2012) was a Turkish-born actress, model, singer and belly dancer, who helped popularize belly dancing in the US and recorded traditional music aimed at a western audience, including the successful 1969 album Bellydance with Özel Türkbaş: How to Make Your Husband a Sultan.

== Life and career ==
She was born in Manisa, Turkey, and moved to Ankara as a child; her mother was a professional dancer. She was a member of the State Children's Theatre in Ankara, before starting a singing career with her sister in Istanbul. During the 1950s, she worked as a model, and also starred in 14 films in Turkey including Gunah Koprusu in 1955, where she met Ayhan Türkbaş who became her husband. She also represented Turkey at international film festivals.

In 1959 she was invited to the US by a promoter, and began performing dance in clubs. Franco Zeffirelli then recruited her to play the role of La Orientale in his production of the opera Thais, in Dallas, Texas, with the New York City Ballet. After the show closed, she continued to tour the country, often performing three 45-minute shows each night and helping to spark a nationwide craze for the style.

She would make her entrance wearing an elaborate cape. Because her agents had told her it was important to establish that she was Turkish or people wouldn't watch her, she began by singing in Turkish. Then she removed the cape. With her veil draped around her torso, she started her dance. She played finger cymbals throughout her set, including floor-work and drum solos. Sometimes she would invite a male audience member up for some humorous volunteer participation. As her English improved, she developed a monologue and told jokes as well. Usually her jokes involved sultans, harems and other aspects of Turkish culture, just as comics mine their own lives for their material.

She settled in New York City with her husband, and regularly appeared in clubs on Eighth Avenue and in the Catskills. Türkbaş regularly worked with leading musicians, and in 1969 released the album How to Make Your Husband a Sultan, on which she was accompanied by the leading Turkish clarinet player Mustafa Kandıralı, together with violinist Cevdet Çağla, Ahmet Yatman (kanun), Tarik Bulut (piano), Gerhard Rudolph (bass guitar), and Leszlo Kubinyi (drum). The record contained a complete 17-minute dance routine, together with other traditional songs, and sold an estimated 150,000 copies in the US, and reportedly one million in Turkey. How To Make Your Husband A Sultan was included in the book 1,000 Recordings To Hear Before You Die.

She followed it up with several further albums including How to Belly Dance for Your Sultan, Dance into Your Sultan's Heart, Alla Turca, and Kismet. She also wrote two books, The Turkish Cookbook by Ozel and The BellyDancer in You.

After she retired from performing, she and her husband owned restaurants and invested in real estate, owning properties in Manhattan and Long Island. She died in New York in 2012 at the age of 73.
