= Nejla Ateş =

Turkish oriental dancer (1932–1995)

- Born: Naciye Batır; March 7, 1932; Constanța, Romania
- Died: September 19, 1995 (aged 63); Istanbul, Turkey
- Occupation(s): Dancer, actress
- Years active: 1952–1966

Nejla Ateş (born Naciye Batır; March 7, 1932 – September 19, 1995) was a Turkish belly dancer and actress. Born in Constanța, Romania, she rose to fame in both Turkey and the United States, where she was often billed as Nejla Ates and nicknamed the "Turkish Delight".

== Career ==
Ateş gained recognition for her performances in several mid-century American films, including King Richard and the Crusaders and Son of Sinbad. She also appeared on Broadway in the musical Fanny.

In November 1954, a nude statue modeled after Ateş was erected in Central Park, attracting widespread public attention.

== Controversy and personal struggles ==
Ateş was involved in several public scandals during her career. She had a widely reported feud with burlesque performer Rose la Rose, who accused her of copying dance routines from her act.

Despite her early success, Ateş experienced personal and financial difficulties. She attempted suicide twice—first via an overdose of tranquilizers and aspirin following a dispute with singer Bobby Colt, who was then married to Hope Diamond. Ateş was named as a correspondent in their divorce proceedings. In her own words, she expressed deep disillusionment: "I'm fed up with life... with love... with everything."

A second suicide attempt involving barbiturates left her in a temporary coma. She also suffered from physical ailments, including a slipped disc, reportedly caused by years of intense dancing.

Later reports noted that Ateş, once described as a petite brunette standing 4 feet 11 inches and weighing 98 pounds, returned to Turkey considerably changed in appearance, reportedly weighing over 200 pounds and having dyed her hair blonde.

== Death ==
Nejla Ateş died in Istanbul on September 19, 1995, at the age of 63, reportedly in poverty and obscurity.
