= Artemis Mourat =

Greek-American Dancer and historian of Turkish Belly dance and Romani dance

- Born: United States
- Occupation(s): Dancer, instructor, dance historian
- Website: artemismourat.com

Elizabeth Artemis Mourat is an American dancer, instructor, and dance historian known for her work in Turkish Oryantal dans and Turkish Romani dance. Active since the 1970s, she has taught, performed, and lectured internationally, with a focus on preserving traditional dance forms and promoting cultural understanding.

== Early life and education ==
Mourat was born in the United States to a Greek father of Anatolian heritage and an American mother from the South. Her upbringing combined multiple cultural influences. She holds a Master of Arts in Psychology and a Master of Social Work, with additional postgraduate studies in dance movement therapy. Mourat is a member of the Phi Beta Kappa Society.

== Career ==
Mourat began performing in the early 1970s, originally in the American cabaret style before shifting toward Turkish and Romani traditions. Her research has included fieldwork in Turkey, Egypt, and Romania. Mourat has appeared in performances and festivals in over 30 countries, and she regularly presents workshops in the United States and Europe.

Her teaching emphasizes historical context, musicality, and technique. In addition to solo instruction, she has collaborated with other instructors to teach comparative styles such as Egyptian Oriental vs Turkish Oryantal dans.

=== Cultural advocacy ===
In addition to her artistic work, Mourat has advocated for greater cultural sensitivity toward Romani traditions. She has used her lectures and writings to address stereotypes and promote more respectful representation in dance communities. She has led cultural workshops on Turkish Romani culture and dance since the 1990s.

== Media and publications ==
Mourat has produced instructional DVDs including Turkish Style Belly Dance, which offers in-depth demonstrations of classic Turkish movements and stylings. She has contributed to various dance magazines and has been featured in conference presentations and educational exhibits.

== Recognition ==
Mourat has received accolades such as "Ethnic Dancer of the Year" from the International Academy of Middle Eastern Dance, and the "Most Popular Ethnic Dancer" award by Zaghareet magazine.
