= Sulukule =

- Quarter
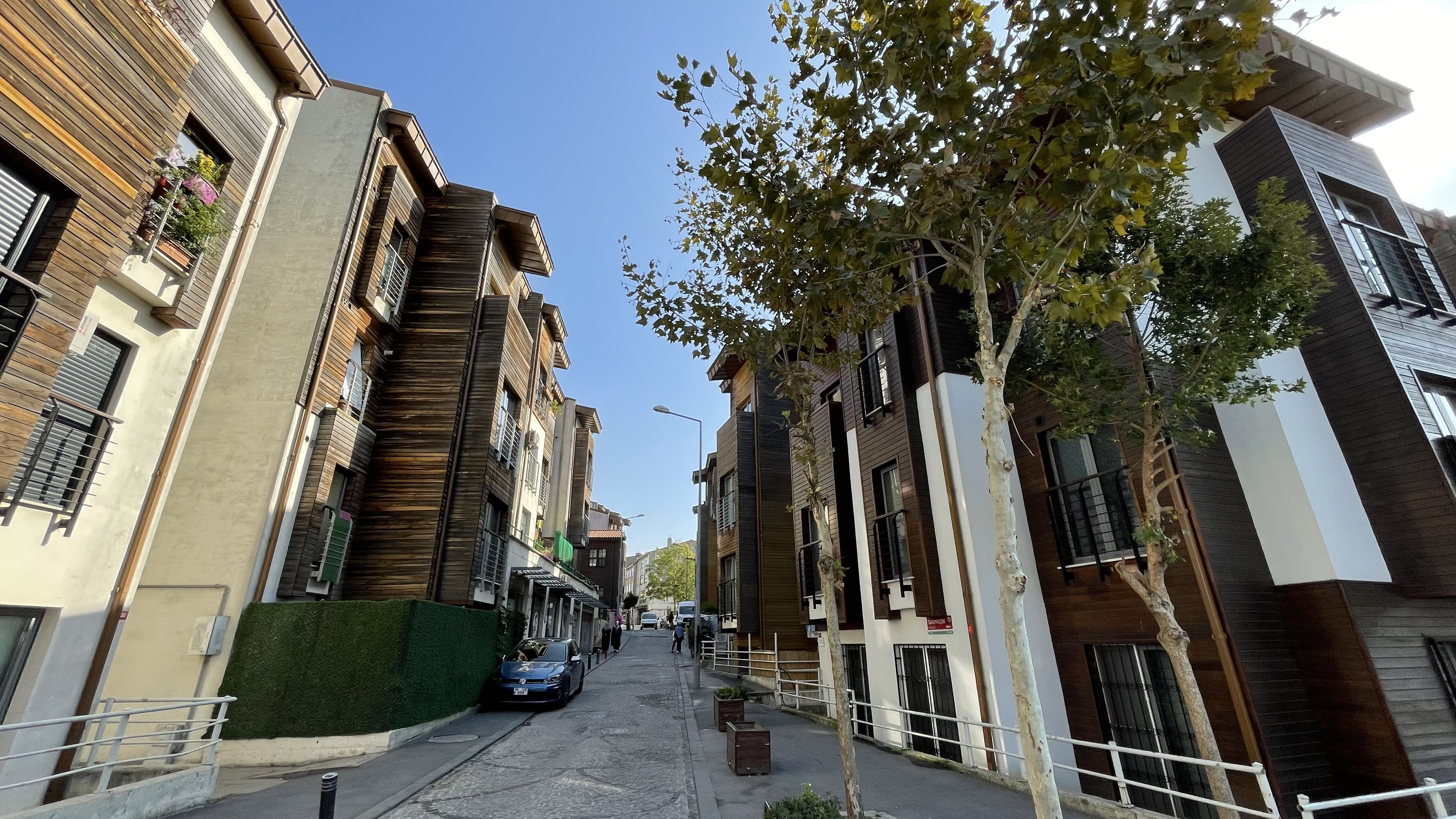
- Sulukule district

- Location within Istanbul Fatih
- Coordinates: 41°01′35″N 28°56′02″E
- Country: Turkey
- Region: Marmara
- Province: Istanbul
- District: Fatih
- Established: 15th century
- Time zone: UTC+3 (TRT)
- Postal code: 34091, 34093, 34097
- Area code: 0212

Sulukule (literally: "Water tower") is a historic quarter in the Fatih district of Istanbul, Turkey. It is within the area of Istanbul’s historic peninsula, adjacent to the western part of the city walls. The area has historically been occupied by Romani communities. Roma presence in this part of Istanbul dates back to Byzantine times, when upon Ottoman conquest in the 15th century, that the quarter became (reportedly) the first district in the world permanently settled by sedentary Romani people in Turkey.

Sulukule was notable for its entertainment houses, where the Romani performed music and dance to the visitors from in and outside Istanbul. The closure of these entertainment houses in 1992 precipitated serious socio-economic decline in the area.

== Redevelopment and gentrification ==
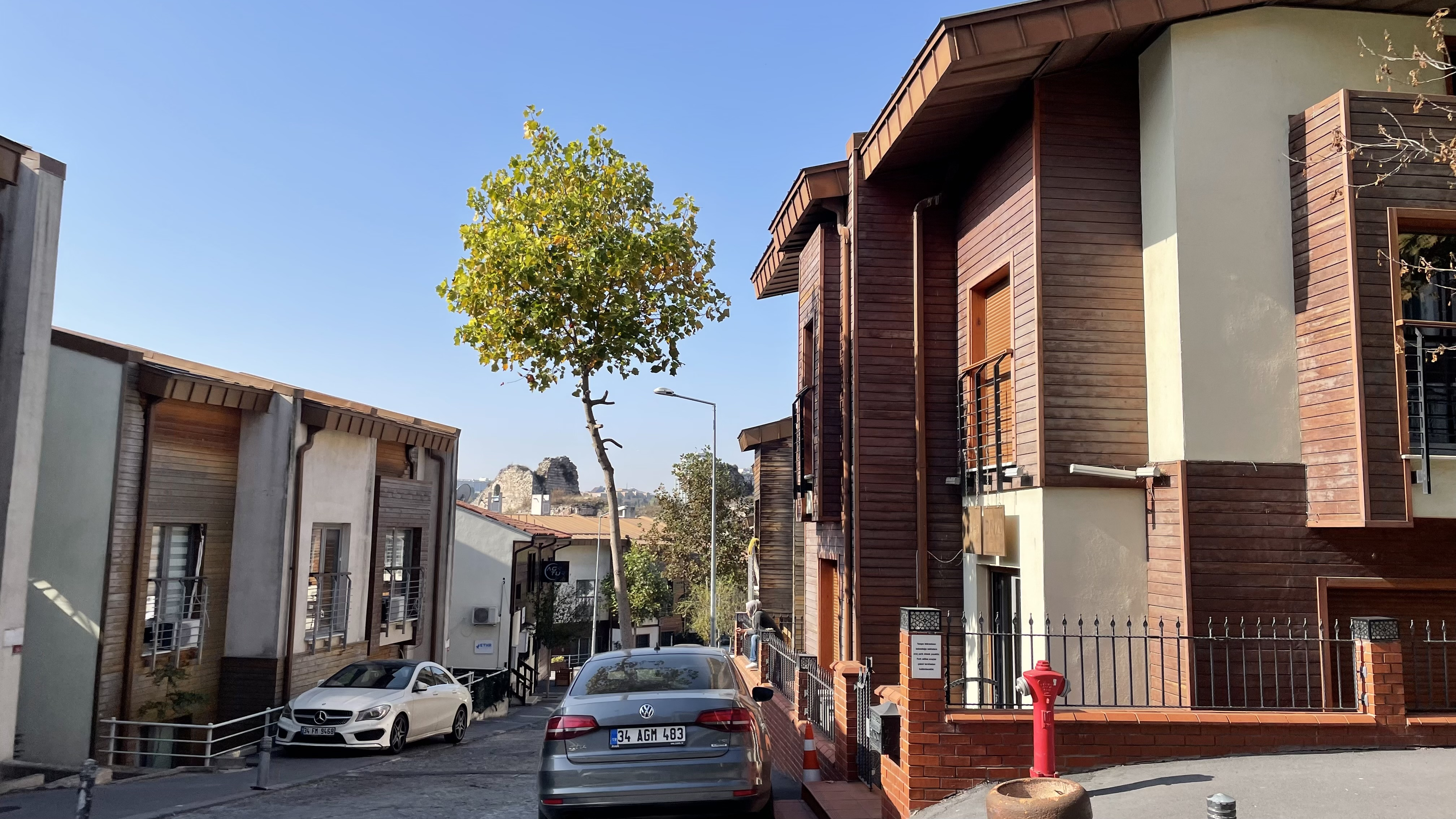
Redevelopment project details

In 2005, the ruling AKP authorities in the Fatih and Greater Istanbul municipalities announced plans to redevelop Sulukule, demolishing most buildings and replacing them with far more expensive housing that was unaffordable to many who had previously lived there. Despite protests and objections, in 2008 the local government started compulsory purchase orders and forced evictions. It is claimed that these evictions disproportionately affected Romani residents.

The redevelopment has since been used as a case study in "planned gentrification".

== Notable people ==
- Sema Yildiz Romani dancer and actress.

== Gallery ==
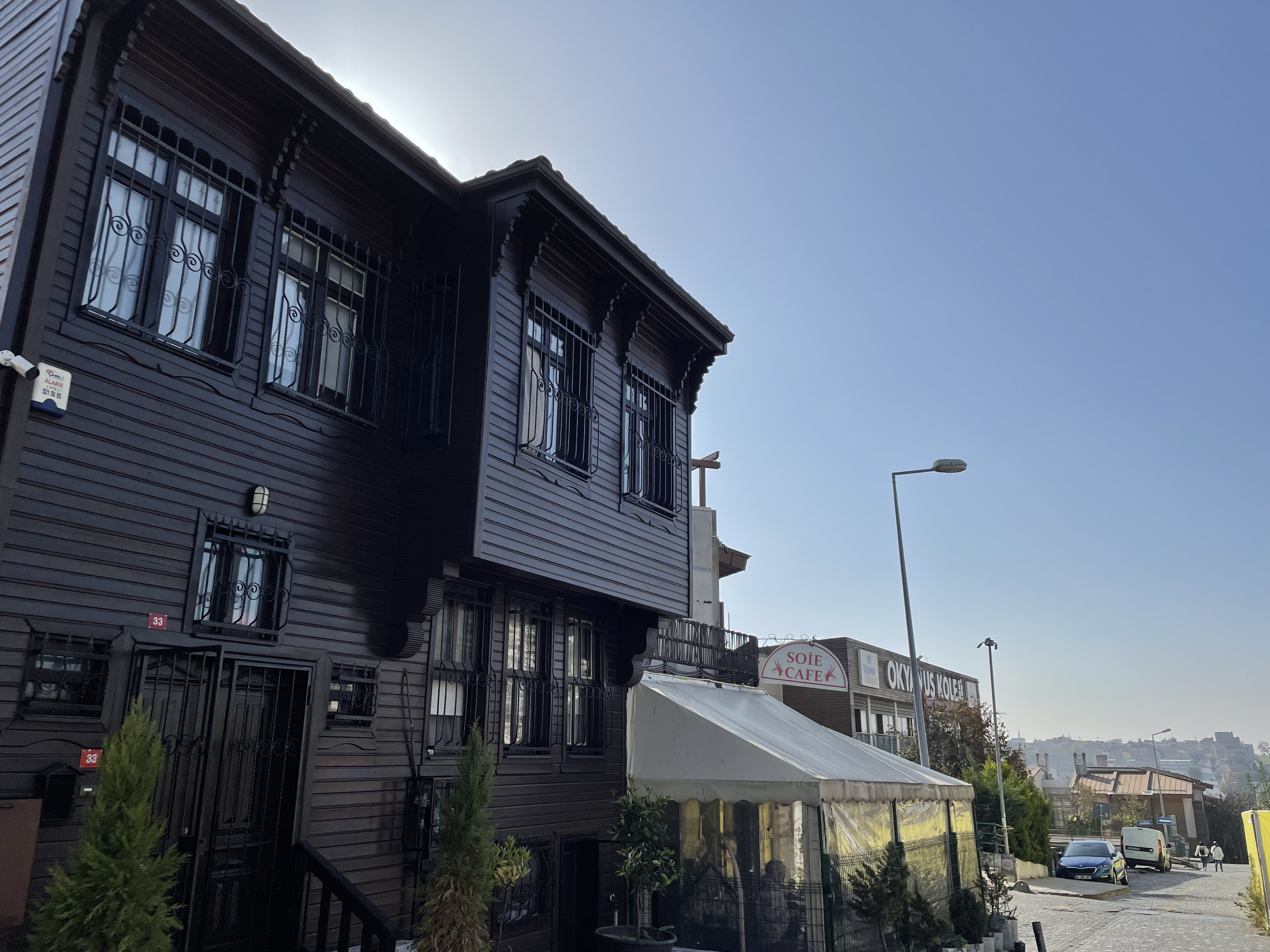

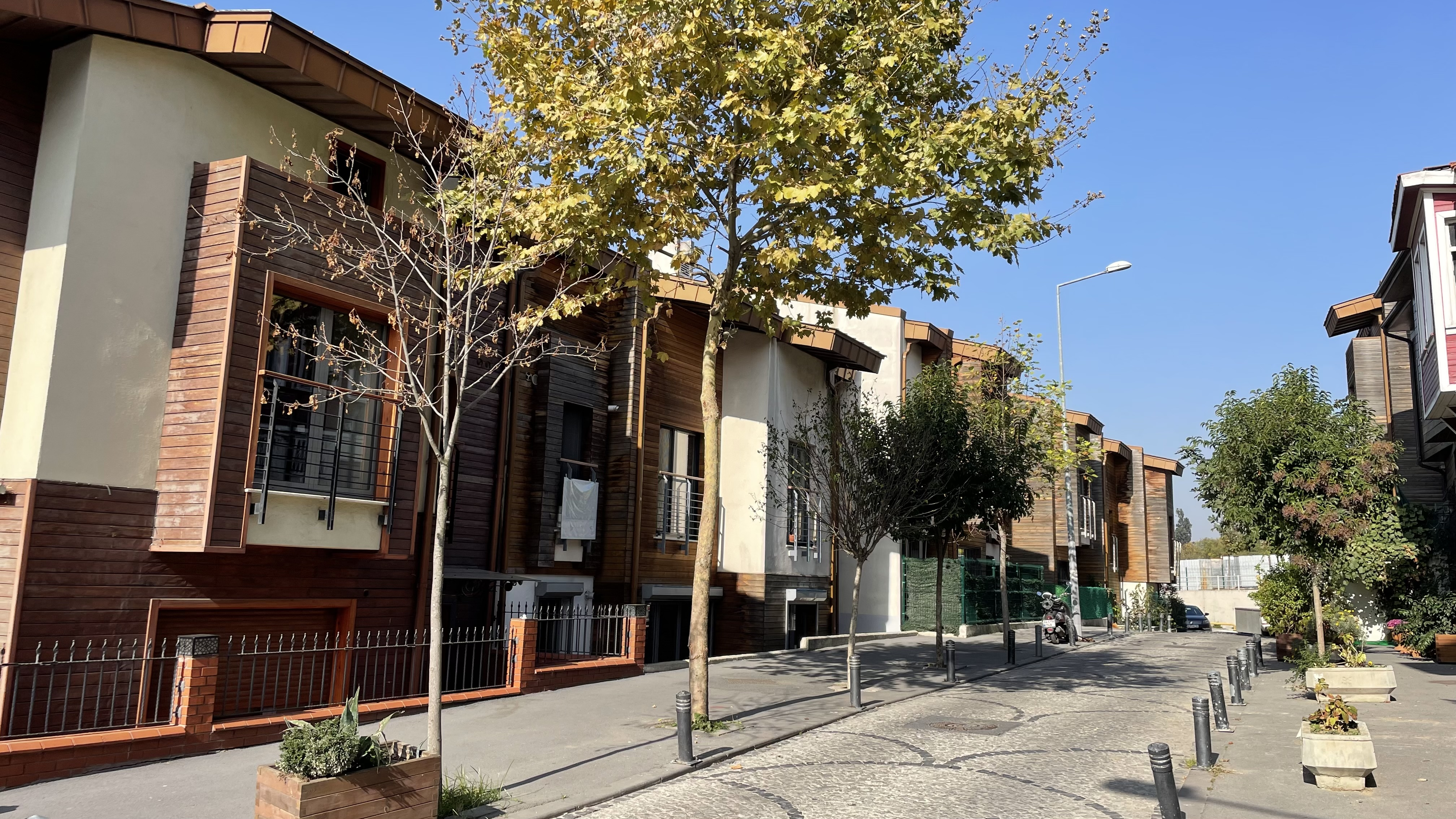

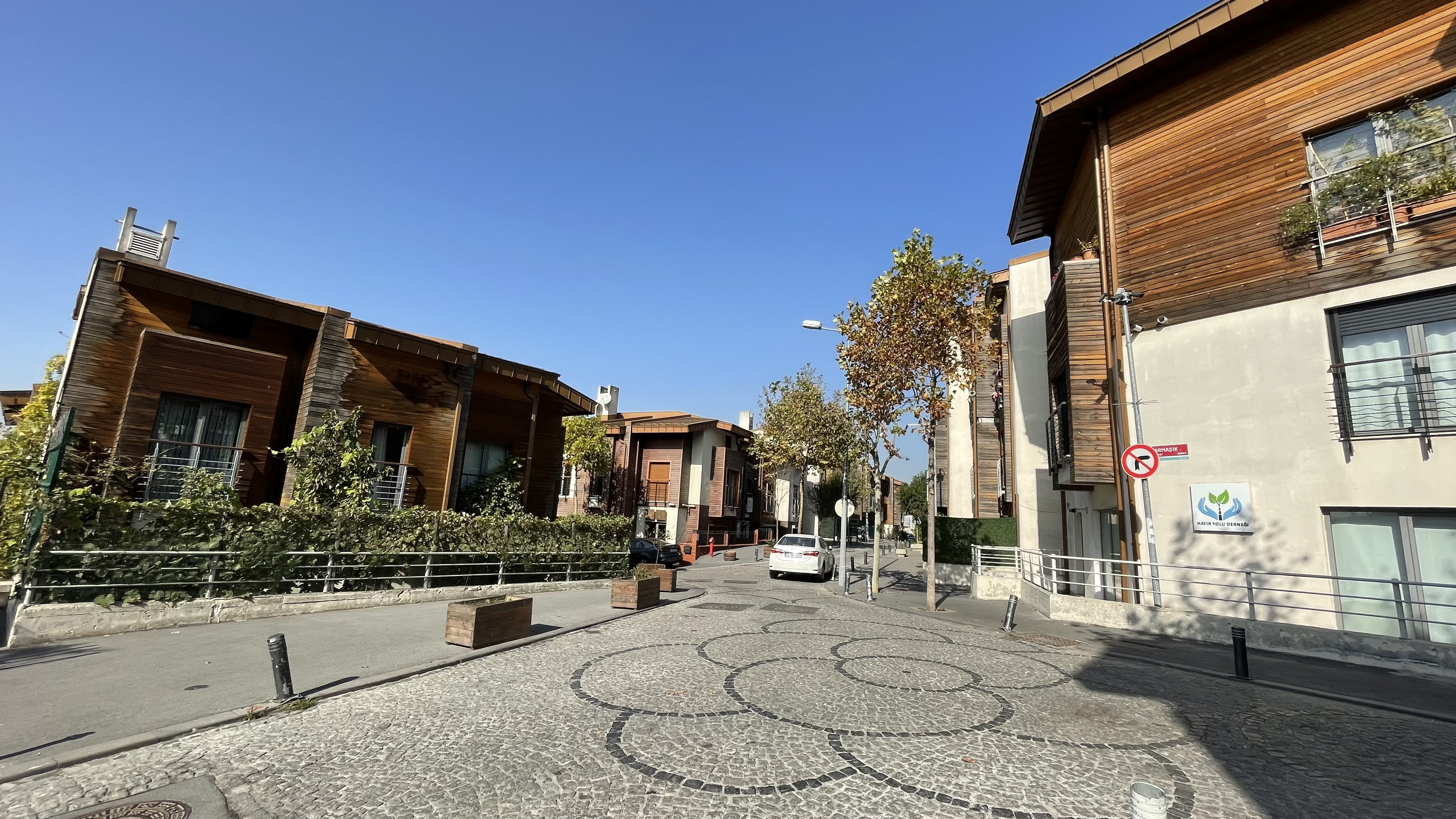

== See also ==
- Romani people in Turkey
