= Didem (belly dancer) =

Turkish belly dancer, model, and singer

- Born: Didem Kınalı; 6 June 1986 (age 40)
- Occupations: Belly dancer, model and singer
- Years active: 2005–present

Didem Kınalı (born 6 June 1986) is a Turkish belly dancer, model, and singer. She has been dancing since her childhood. She has gained some measure of international recognition since she started appearing on the live Turkish variety television programme called the İbo Show, hosted by İbrahim Tatlıses. She was brought up in Gaziosmanpaşa, and is of Romani descent; her mother (also a belly dancer) emigrated from Thessaloniki, and her father emigrated from Yugoslavia.
