= Heartbeat =

Heartbeat, heart beat or heartbeats may refer to:

== Science and technology ==
- Heartbeat (biology), one cardiac cycle of the heart
- Heartbeat (computing), a periodic signal to indicate normal operation or to synchronize parts of a system
  - Heartbeat (software), clustering software from the Linux-HA project

== Arts and entertainment ==
=== Films ===
- Heartbeat (1938 film), a French comedy
- Heartbeat (1946 film), an American film by Sam Wood, starring Ginger Rogers
- La Chamade (film) (English title: Heartbeat), a 1968 French film by Alain Cavalier
- Heart Beat (film), a 1980 American film about the love triangle between Jack Kerouac, Carolyn Cassady and Neal Cassady
- Dhadkan (2000 film) (English title: Heartbeat), a 2000 Indian Hindi-language film by Dharmesh Darshan
- Heart Beats (film), a 2007 Indian Malayalam-language film
- Heartbeats (2010 film), a Canadian French–English film by Xavier Dolan
- Heartbeat (2010 film), a South Korean film about the illegal trade in human organs
- Heartbeat (2012 film), an Austrian short film
- Heartbeat (2014 film), a Canadian film
- Heartbeats (2017 film), an Indian film by Duane Adler

=== Television ===
- HeartBeat (1988 TV series), an American medical drama that aired on ABC
- Heartbeat (British TV series), a 1992–2010 British period drama
- Heartbeat (1993 film), an NBC TV film
- Heartbeat (2016 TV series), an American medical drama that aired on NBC
- Heartbeat (South Korean TV series), a 2023 television series
- "Heartbeat", the second episode of the YouTube animated series Murder Drones (2021–2024)
- Heart Beat (TV series), 2024 Indian Tamil-language television series
- Heartbeats (TV series), a Hindi-language medical drama that aired on MX Player

=== Music ===
==== Bands ====
- The Heartbeats (doo-wop group), a 1950s American doo-wop group
- The Heartbeats (big band), an American jazz ensemble
- Heartbeat (band), a British Christian pop band

==== Albums ====
- Heartbeat (Bad Boys Blue album), 1986
- Heartbeat (Curtis Mayfield album) or the title song, 1979
- Heartbeat (Da' T.R.U.T.H. album) or the title song, 2014
- Heartbeat (Don Johnson album) or the Wendy Waldman title song (see below), 1986
- Heartbeat (G.E.M. album) or the title song, 2015
- Heartbeat (Jasmine Rae album) or the title song, 2015
- Heartbeat (Jeremy Rosado album) or the title song, 2015
- Heartbeat (The Oak Ridge Boys album), 1987
- Heartbeat (Ruby Lin album) or the title song, 1999
- Heartbeat (Ryuichi Sakamoto album) or the title song (see below), 1991
- Heartbeat (Sarah Engels album) or the title song, 2011
- Heartbeat - It's a Lovebeat by The DeFranco Family, or the title song, 1973
- Heartbeat: The Abbreviated King Crimson or the title song (see below), 1991
- The Heartbeat (album), 2012, by Bellarive
- Heartbeat City, 1984, by the Cars
- Heartbeat Radio, a 2009 albym by Sondre Lerche
- Heart Beat (Wang Leehom album) or the title song, 2008
- Heartbeats – Chris Rea's Greatest Hits, 2005
- Heart Beats (Dami Im album), 2014
- Heart Beats (Danny album), 2007
- Heart Beats (Keystone Trio album), 1995
- Heartbeat, by Chris & Cosey, 1981
- Heart Beat, by Space Tribe, 2002
- Heartbeats, by Grum, 2010

==== Songs ====
- "Heartbeat" (2PM song), 2009
- "Heartbeat" (Annie song), 2004
- "Heartbeat" (BTS song), 2019
- "Heartbeat" (Buddy Holly song), 1958
- "Heartbeat" (Can-linn song), 2014
- "Heartbeat" (Carrie Underwood song), 2015
- "Heartbeat" (Childish Gambino song), 2011
- "Heartbeat" (Enrique Iglesias song), 2010
- "Heartbeat" (The Fray song), 2011
- "Heartbeat" (Girlfriend song), 1993
- "Heartbeat" (Wendy Waldman song), 1982; covered by Helen Reddy, 1983 and Don Johnson, 1986
- "Heartbeat" (Jimmy Somerville song), 1995
- "Heartbeat" (Justs song), 2016
- "Heartbeat" (King Crimson song), 1982
- "Heartbeat" (Late of the Pier song), 2008
- "Heartbeat" (Margaret song), 2015
- "Heartbeat" (Nina Sky song), 2012
- "Heartbeat" (Nneka song), 2008
- "Heartbeat" (Richard Orlinski and Eva Simons song), 2016
- "Heartbeat" (The Runaways song), 1977
- "Heartbeat" (Scouting for Girls song), 2008
- "Heartbeat" (Steps song), 1998
- "Heartbeat" (Taana Gardner song), 1981
- "Heartbeat" (Wilkinson song), 2013
- "Heartbeat" (Wire song), 1978; covered by Big Black, 1987
- "Heartbeat (Tainai Kaiki II)", by Ryuichi Sakamoto and David Sylvian, 1992
- "Heart Beat" (Miliyah Kato song), 2012
- "Heart Beat" (Yoasobi song), 2023
- "Heartbeat Song" (The Futureheads song), 2010
- "Heartbeat Song" (Kelly Clarkson song), 2015
- "Heartbeats" (The Knife song), 2002
- "Heartbeatz", by Styles & Breeze, 2005
- "Heartbeat", by Carly Rae Jepsen from Dedicated Side B, 2020
- "Heartbeat", by Christopher from Closer, 2016
- "Heartbeat", by David Cook from Digital Vein, 2015
- "Heartbeat", by Iyaz from Replay, 2010
- "Heartbeat", by James Barker Band from Ahead of Our Time, 2023
- "Heartbeat", by James Blunt from The Afterlove, 2017
- "Heartbeat", by Leona Lewis on her single "I Got You", 2009
- "Heartbeat", by Madonna from Hard Candy, 2008
- "Heartbeat", by Marcus & Martinus from Together, 2016
- "Heartbeat", by Nessa Barrett from Aftercare, 2024
- "Heartbeat", by New Kids on the Block from Thankful, 2017
- "Heartbeat", by Paris Hilton from Paris, 2006
- "Heartbeat", by Plan B from Heaven Before All Hell Breaks Loose, 2018
- "Heartbeat", by the Psychedelic Furs from Mirror Moves, 1984
- "Heartbeat", by Red 7, 1985
- "Heartbeat", by Ruby Murray, 1954
- "Heartbeat", by Shree Pritam, Baba Sehgal, Saberi Bhattacharya from Khiladi, 2013
- "Heartbeat", by Stereo Skyline from Stuck on Repeat, 2010
- "Heartbeat", by Tahiti 80, 2000
- "Heartbeat", by Vicetone, 2013
- "Heartbeat", by Wham! from Make It Big, 1984
- "Heartbeats", by Matoma from One in a Million, 2018
- "Heartbeats", by Tom Walker from What a Time to Be Alive, 2019

=== Other arts and entertainment ===
- Heartbeat (Creech novel), 2004, by Sharon Creech
- Heartbeat (Steel novel), 1991, by Danielle Steel
- Heartbeat 1521, a defunct radio station in Northern Ireland
- Heartbeat Tour, a concert tour by Jessie J

== Companies ==
- Heartbeat (company), a video game developer
- Heartbeat Productions, a British record company

== See also ==
- Heartbeat International
- Beating Heart (disambiguation)
- In a Heartbeat (disambiguation)
- Hartbeat, a BBC television children's programme featuring Tony Hart
- Heatbeat, an Argentinian trance-dance band
