= Where the Wild Roses Grow (film) =

- Directed by: Romana Carén
- Written by: Romana Carén
- Produced by: Romana Carén; Frederik Füssel
- Starring: Katja Benrath; Tony Matzl; Kai Peterson; Romana Carén; Geoffrey Dawes; Maria Bambury; Philipp Bambury; Julia Fürst; Mark Mayr; Thomas Watzak
- Cinematography: Frederik Füssel
- Edited by: Daniela Knotter McDonald, Robert Zapletal
- Music by: Geoffrey Dawes, Thomas Borchert
- Release date: 2011
- Running time: 9 minutes
- Country: Austria
- Language: German

Where the Wild Roses Grow is a 2011 Austrian short film directed by Romana Carén, about the young woman Yasmina whose solitary life is changed by the mysterious stranger name Leon. The screenplay was semi-finalist of the 22nd WriteMovies.com International Writing Competition. The film was screened in the Short Film Corner of the 2012 Cannes Film Festival.

== Plot ==
Traumatized by the untimely death of her brother when they both were children, Yasmina lives an isolated life in the village Angloville. One day a mysterious man comes to the village and invites her to a picnic in the woods. She decides to take the risk and finds a long hidden treasure.

== Cast ==
- Katja Benrath as Yasmina
- Tony Matzl as Leon
- Kai Peterson as Herr Konrad
- Romana Carén as Julia
- Thomas Watzak as Manuel (voice)
- Geoffrey Dawes as Peter
- Maria Bambury as Maria
- Philipp Bambury as Philipp
- Julia Fürst as Dame
- Mark Mayr as junger Mann
