= Beating Heart =

Beating Heart or similar terms may refer to:

- Cardiac cycle of the heart
- Heart sounds

== Film ==
- Beating Heart (film), a 1940 French film directed by Henri Decoin
- Beating Heart (TV series), a 2005 South Korean television drama series
- Beating Hearts, 2024 film

== Music ==
- "Beating Heart" (Ellie Goulding song), 2014
- "Beating Heart", English-language version of 1980 Gyllene Tider song "När vi två blir en"

== Other uses ==
- 💓 (U+1F493), Unicode BEATING HEART symbol, see Heart symbol#Computer code
- "A Beating Heart...", an episode of Dexter: Resurrection

== See also ==
- Heartbeat (disambiguation)
- Bleeding heart (disambiguation)
