= Romana Carén =

Austrian actress, writer and director (born 1979)

- Born: 2 January 1979 (age 47); Vienna, Austria
- Occupations: Actress, writer/director, vocal coach
- Years active: 1998–present

Romana Carén (born 2 January 1979) is an actress, writer/director and vocal coach from Austria.

== Biography ==
After she had graduated from Camillo Sitte Höhere Technische Lehranstalt in structural engineering she studied law at the University of Vienna and astronomy at the University of Central Lancashire.

She was trained in acting at the Actor's Studio Pallas in Vienna and graduated with the Austrian State Diploma in Acting. To continue her education she went to London where she attended a course in contemporary drama at the Royal Academy of Dramatic Art.

Carén has been on stage since the age of eight, including at the Burgtheater and the Theater Drachengasse in Vienna. Her first lead role was the title role in Alice in Wonderland. Her film and TV credits include SOKO Donau, Tatort, Jud Süß - Film ohne Gewissen, directed by Oskar Roehler, Sisi, directed by Xaver Schwarzenberger and The Pillars of the Earth with Donald Sutherland.

She has written several plays, screenplays, and poems. The play Glückskämpfer had its world premiere in 2007 in Vienna, Wintervögel in 2010 and Sein oder nicht sein in 2011.

Later she enrolled at the London Film Academy and graduated in filmmaking with distinction. Together with some of her co-students she founded the production company Film´84 International to produce short and feature films as well as commercials. Their first short film in 2011, Make a Wish, was in the catalogue of the Short Film Corner of the Cannes Film Festival 2011.

Her short film screenplay Where the Wild Roses Grow was a semi-finalist in the 22nd WriteMovies.com International Writing Competition. Later it was screened in the Short Film Corner of the Cannes Film Festival 2012.

== Filmography ==
List of filmmaking credits
Year	Title	Role	Notes
2014	There are no kangaroos in Austria	writer/director	feature
2012	Heartbeat	writer/director	short
2012	Hopped Up	1st assistant director	feature
2012	Where the Wild Roses Grow	writer/director	short, post-production, semi-finalist in the WriteMovies.com International Writing Competition #22, screened in the Short Film Corner of the Cannes Film Festival 2012
2011	Make a Wish	writer/director	short, in the catalogue of Short Film Corner/ Cannes Film Festival 2011
2010	Portobello Road	post production assistant	feature
2010	Ladri di biscotti	director	short
2010	One last Tango	writer	short
2007	Goodbye	writer	feature

List of film and television credits (acting)
Year	Title	Role	Notes
2014	There are no kangaroos in Austria	Lena	
2012	Heartbeat	Emilia	
2012	Where the Wild Roses Grow	Julia	
2012	Hopped Up	Zooey	
2010	The Man from Beijing	Hannah	
2010	Oh Shit!	Nucleara	
2010	Jud Süß - Film ohne Gewissen	Theresia	
2010	The Pillars of the Earth	Lady at court	
2010	Tatort	Epitarsis	
2009–2010	SOKO Donau	Sara	
2010	Sisi	Sister Johanna	

== Theatre ==
List of theatre credits (acting)
Year	Title	Role	Notes
2011	Sein oder nicht sein	Eva, Elena, Maria, C	Das OFF-Theater
2010	Wintervögel	Emilia	Theater Drachengasse
2010	Mädchen in Uniform	mayor's wife	Das OFF-Theater
2010	Liebe a la carté	six different roles	Theater Schloßgärtnerei Reichenau
2009	Alt Genug	Stephanie	Das OFF-Theater
2009	Symmetrien des Abschieds	Host	Burgtheater
2007	Glückskämpfer	Anastasia	Das OFF-Theater
2006	Alice im Wunderland	Alice	Schule des Theaters
