= Miles Away (Madonna song) =

2008 single by Madonna

Single by Madonna

from the album Hard Candy
- Released: November 21, 2008
- Recorded: 2007
- Studio: Record Plant (Los Angeles); Sarm West (London); Criteria (Miami)
- Genre: Dance-pop
- Length: 4:49
- Label: Warner Bros.
- Songwriters: Madonna; Timbaland; Justin Timberlake; Nate Hills
- Producers: Timbaland; Justin Timberlake; Danja

Madonna singles chronology
"Give It 2 Me" (2008)	"Miles Away" (2008)	"Celebration" (2009)

Music video
- "Miles Away" on YouTube

"Miles Away" is a song recorded by American singer Madonna from her eleventh studio album, Hard Candy (2008). It was written by Madonna, Justin Timberlake, Timbaland, and Nate "Danja" Hills. Unlike the previous songs from the album, which are dance-oriented, "Miles Away" is a ballad with reggae, electronica, and Latin influences. Its lyrics talk about long-distance relationships, and draw inspiration from Madonna's marriage to British film director Guy Ritchie. "Miles Away" was released as Hard Candy's third and final single on November 21, 2008, and subsequently added to the singer's third compilation album, Celebration (2009).

Upon release, "Miles Away" received generally positive reviews from music critics, who praised its catchiness, introspective tones, and deemed it one of the album's best. Commercially, the single had a lukewarm reception. In the United States, it failed to enter the Billboard Hot 100, but became Madonna's seventh consecutive number-one on the Hot Dance Airplay chart. In the United Kingdom, it became her lowest charting single in thirty four years. "Miles Away" saw more success in Spain ―where it reached the chart's first spot― and in Japan, where it became the year's best-selling digital single.

No music video was shot for "Miles Away". Instead, a clip was put together made up of footage taken from 2008–2009's Sticky & Sweet Tour. Madonna sang the track on the promotional concerts offered for Hard Candy, on her set at the BBC Radio 1's Big Weekend, and on the forementioned Sticky & Sweet Tour.

== Background and development ==
"I'm American and he [Ritchie] is British, and I have to come to America all the time. [...] Especially at the beginning of our relationship, that long-distance thing was very frustrating. I also think it's easier for people to say things from a distance; it's safer".

— Madonna on how her relationship with British film director Guy Ritchie served as inspiration for "Miles Away".

In October 2007, Madonna announced her departure from Warner Bros. Records, and signed a $120 million, ten-year 360 deal with American multinational entertainment company Live Nation; the deal would encompass her future music-related businesses, including touring, merchandising and associated sponsorship agreements, among other things. For Hard Candy, her eleventh studio album and her final with Warner Bros., she chose to "work her magic" on the sound of urban contemporary music, and collaborated with American singer Justin Timberlake, rapper Timbaland, record production duo The Neptunes ―Pharrell Williams and Chad Hugo― as well as Nate "Danja" Hills. Recording sessions for Hard Candy took place at Los Angeles' Record Plant studios, Miami's Criteria Studios, and London's Sarm West Studios.

Madonna wrote and produced "Miles Away" alongside Timberlake, Timbaland, and Danja. The song came up when her and Timberlake began "playing around" with ideas and phrases. Timberlake recalled Madonna had with her "all these thoughts, riddles, poems [and] feelings". Eventually, they both settled down on long-distance relationships, a personal subject for both of them. Timberlake played a guitar riff for Madonna and asked, "How do we want to do this? What do we want it to be about? What do we want to say?". She "immediately" came up with the words and started singing. She subsequently revealed that she tapped into the "global consciousness of people who have intimacy problems", and drew inspiration from her marriage to then-husband Guy Ritchie. When they were done, Timberlake felt he had "accomplished a miracle" with "Miles Away": create a song that was "classic Madonna".

== Composition and release ==
"Miles Away"
Audio sample of "Miles Away", featuring backing vocals repeating the line So far away.

Musically, "Miles Away" has been noted a dance pop ballad with a "Hispano-reggae" feel, that mixes "Vince Clarke-style electronica and the pseudo-Latin feel of songs like 'La Isla Bonita'". With lyrics that talk about long-distance relationships, Jennifer Vineyard from MTV pointed out that it's the song that interrupts the dance-oriented nature from Hard Candy's first tracks, and delves into more emotional subjects. Madonna herself described it as a song "most people who work can relate to. If part of your work is travelling, and the person you are with also works and travels, you find yourself separated a lot and it can be very frustrating".

According to the sheet music published by Alfred Publishing Inc., "Miles Away" is set in the time signature of common time, with a moderate tempo of 116 beats per minute. Written in the key of A minor, and with a basic sequence of Am–Em–G–F–Am–Em–G–F as its chord progression, Madonna's voice spans from the low-note of G_{3} to the high-note of C_{5}. The song opens with the sound of acoustic guitar before a "stuttering beat drops in". Then, the track slowly "swells" until it's filled with "atmospheric synths". The lyrics are melancholic and include lines such as, You always seem to have the biggest heart when we’re 6,000 miles apart, and I guess we’re at our best when we’re miles away. Also present are "melodic" backing vocals that echo Madonna's past work, uttering the line So far away, you’re so far away. Both Rolling Stone's Caryn Ganz and Alexis Petridis from The Guardian opined that the lyrics to "Miles Away" foreshadowed the singer's divorce from Ritchie.

On April 21, 2008, one week before Hard Candy's release in the United States, "Miles Away" and other songs from the album leaked online. In most European countries, the song was released as the album's third single on November 21. (Note: See sources cited on "Weekly charts" section) Official remixes were made available for download on August 11, 2009. "Miles Away" was included in Celebration (2009), Madonna's third compilation album.

== Critical reception ==
Critical feedback towards "Miles Away" was generally positive. It was named one of Hard Candy's best songs by Billboard, Instinct, and Gay Times. It is among the album's "few contemplative moments", according to the Los Angeles Times' Ann Powers. This sentiment was echoed by Chris Willman from Entertainment Weekly, who said it was one of the few "actual confessions" on the album. Michael Roffman from online magazine Consequence deemed "Miles Away" the album's catchiest, further referring to it as an "introspective, emotionally arching love song" that, "despite its simplicity, is bearable and commits to some sense of emotion". While the staff of NME said it was an "excellent" song, Caryn Ganz singled out its "lush melancholy pining". On his review of Hard Candy for AllMusic, Stephen Thomas Erlewine compared "Miles Away" to Timberlake's "What Goes Around... Comes Around" (2006). In this vein, Sal Cinquemani from Slant Magazine said the song had the "distinct, modern stamp" of both Timberlake and Timbaland. In another occasion, Eric Henderson ―also from Slant Magazine― said "Miles Away" is a "genuinely poignant assessment that might well be aimed at both her harshest critics as well as her most demanding fans".

Joey Guerra from the Houston Chronicle opined that "Miles Away" was one of the better moments in Hard Candy, and said it sounded like Madonna's work from the late 1980s. Echoes of past "milestones of Madonna's epic career", such as "Holiday" (1983), "Into the Groove" (1985), "Ray of Light" (1998) and "Music" (2000), were perceived by the BBC's Tom Young, who further referred to "Miles Away" as a "genuinely good, genuinely felt" song. From Bloomberg News, Mark Beech pointed out a "Ray of Light trancelike vibe [on 'Miles Away'], as she meditates about life on the road". In more critical reviews, Pitchfork's Tom Ewing wrote: "You won't get ['Miles Away] out of your head in a hurry but that's less to do with its quality than the didactic way [Madonna] delivers [it]". Alexis Petridis criticized Madonna's vocals: "[S]he sings with the emotional engagement of a sat-nav suggesting a right turn onto the A23". Thomas Hausner from PopMatters said it was a redundant and tedious song, that would be turned down by Ashlee Simpson and Britney Spears. Writing for the Evening Standard, El Hunt saw "Miles Away" as a "lesser version" of Nelly Furtado's "All Good Things (Come to an End)" (2006). Chris Gerard from WRC-TV dismissed it as lyrically bland. "Miles Away" has been noted one of Madonna's best songs by Entertainment Weekly and Parade.

== Chart performance ==
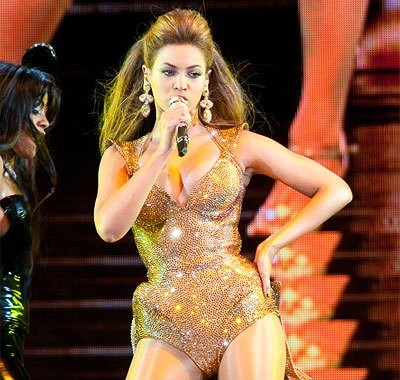
Beyoncé's (picture) "Single Ladies (Put a Ring on It)" kept "Miles Away" from topping Billboard's Hot Dance Club Play chart.

In the US, "Miles Away" failed to enter the Billboard Hot 100, but it did reach number two on Billboard's Hot Dance Club Play chart, behind "Single Ladies (Put a Ring on It)" by Beyoncé. With a "31 to 1" leap, the song became Madonna's ninth release to top the Hot Singles Sales chart, as well as the chart's first number-one of 2009. A similar feat was achieve on Billboard's Hot Dance Airplay chart, where "Miles Away" was Madonna's seventh consecutive number-one. This also made her the artist with the most hits on this chart. "Miles Away" debuted and peaked on the 23rd position of the Canadian Hot 100 on May 17, 2008, remaining on the chart for 14 weeks.

On December 6, 2008, the song entered the UK Singles Chart at number 39, selling 5,643 copies. The following week it slid to Number 68, before dropping out of the chart altogether. "Miles Away" was Madonna's lowest-charting single in the country since "Oh Father" and "Borderline", which peaked at number 16 and 56 on 1996 and 1984, respectively. The song saw lukewarm success in Belgium, Denmark and Switzerland, where it barely cracked the top 40. It had a worst reception in France, as it reached the chart's 54th spot. In Spain, "Miles Away" became the third consecutive single from Hard Candy to reach number one on the official singles chart. The song's "Thin White Duke Mix" charted at number 28 on the Australian Club Charts.

"Miles Away" was particularly successful in Japan. It peaked at number seven on the Japan Hot 100 on May 30, 2008, and stayed on the chart for 10 weeks. Additionally, it became the best-selling digital single of 2008 and was certified platinum and double platinum by the Recording Industry Association of Japan: for 250,000 PC downloads, and 500,000 ringtone downloads, respectively. In April 2009, Billboard reported that over 680,000 digital downloads of the song had been sold in Japan. At the 23rd annual Japan Gold Disc Awards, "Miles Away" won three awards: Mastertone of the Year, Mobile Single Track of the Year, and Online Single Track of the Year.

== Promotion and live performances ==
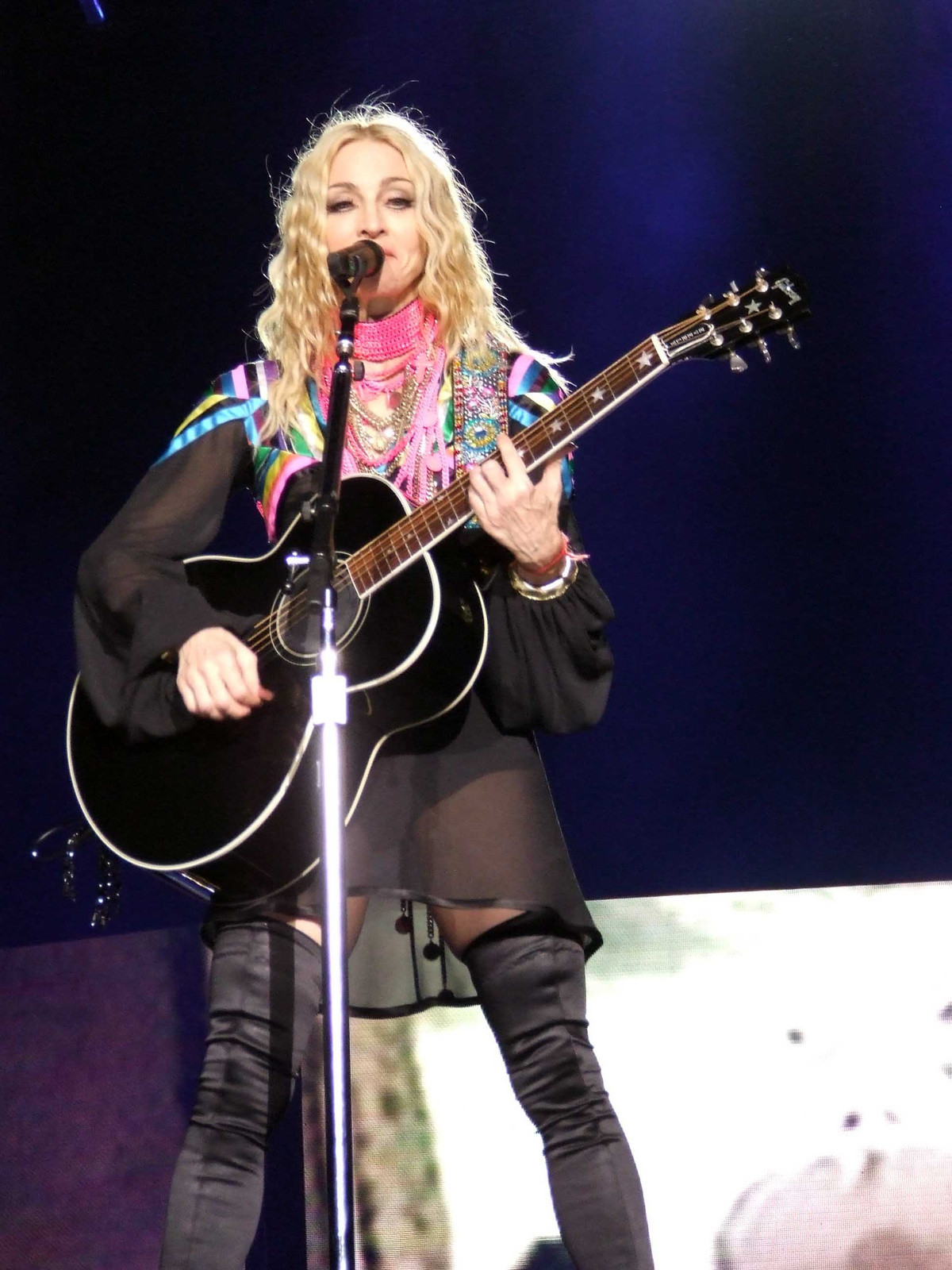
Madonna singing "Miles Away" on 2008–2009's Sticky & Sweet Tour

No music video was shot for "Miles Away". A clip consisting of footage taken from Madonna's 2008―2009 Sticky & Sweet Tour was put together by her collaborator Nathan Rissman, and subsequently added to the video compilation Celebration: The Video Collection (2009). The song was featured in the Japanese TV drama Change, which began airing in April 2008.

Madonna sang "Miles Away" on the promotional concerts offered for Hard Candy, which took place at New York's Roseland Ballroom on April 30, and at Paris' Olympia hall on May 6. Dressed in a black ensemble consisting of satin bodice and pants, tailcoat with pink lining, and lace-up boots with six-inch heels, she played acoustic guitar and sang, as images of airplanes and plane tickets flashed on the screens behind her. Reviewing the Roseland Ball show, David Sprague from Variety felt the song, "would’ve made for a nice interlude midway through a lengthier perf, but seemed misplaced at the front end of such a brief program". On May 10, Madonna sang "Miles Away" on the BBC Radio 1's Big Weekend.

On the Sticky & Sweet Tour, the track was given a gypsy theme, with Madonna again playing guitar, and leading a sing-along. She wore a Givenchy gypsy-inspired black dress embellished with colored ribbons. While reviewing the concert, T'Cha Dunlevy from the Montreal Gazette pointed out that, "[The crowd] sang and clapped along to the infectious chorus [of 'Miles Away']. It was one of the few truly communal moments of the night". During the tour's Boston stop, Madonna dedicated the song to the "emotionally retarded", which Ben Leach from The Daily Telegraph speculated was a "swipe" at Ritchie. A performance of "Miles Away" was included on the Sticky & Sweet Tour live album release (2010), recorded in Buenos Aires.

== Track listing and formats ==
- UK CD Single
1. "Miles Away" (Album Version) – 4:48
2. "Miles Away" (Thin White Duke Remix) – 6:10
- Maxi single
1. "Miles Away" (Album Version) – 4:48
2. "Miles Away" (Thin White Duke Remix) – 6:10
3. "Miles Away" (Rebirth Remix) – 7:27
4. "Miles Away" (Johnny Vicious Club Mix) – 7:23
- Promo single
1. "Miles Away" (Thin White Duke Remix) – 6:09
2. "Miles Away" (Johnny Vicious Club Mix) – 7:22
3. "Miles Away" (Johnny Vicious Warehouse Mix) – 8:18
4. "Miles Away" (Morgan Page Remix) – 7:07
5. "Miles Away" (Morgan Page Dub) – 7:10
6. "Miles Away" (Rebirth Remix) – 7:24
7. "Miles Away" (Aaron LaCrate & Samir B-More Gutter Mix) – 4:57
- Digital single (Remixes)
1. "Miles Away" – 4:48
2. "Miles Away" (Aaron LaCrate & Samir B-More Gutter Mix) – 4:57
3. "Miles Away" (Johnny Vicious Club Mix) – 7:22
4. "Miles Away" (Johnny Vicious Warehouse Mix) – 8:19
5. "Miles Away" (Morgan Page Dub) – 7:10
6. "Miles Away" (Morgan Page Remix) – 7:07
7. "Miles Away" (Rebirth Remix) – 7:25
8. "Miles Away" (Thin White Duke Remix) – 6:09
9. "Miles Away" (Thin White Duke Edit) – 4:34
- US 2× 12" Vinyl Set
1. A1. "Miles Away" (Thin White Duke Remix) – 6:09
2. A2. "Miles Away" (Radio Edit) – 3:43
3. B1. "Miles Away" (Johnny Vicious Club Remix) – 7:26
4. B2. "Miles Away" (Morgan Page Dub) – 7:08
5. C1. "Miles Away" (Johnny Vicious Warehouse Mix) - 8:20
6. C2. "Miles Away" (Aaron LaCrate & Samir B-More Gutter Remix) - 5:00
7. D1. "Miles Away" (Morgan Page Remix) - 7:07
8. D2. "Miles Away" (Rebirth Remix) - 7:30

== Credits and personnel ==
Credits adapted from the Hard Candy liner notes.

=== Management ===
- Recorded at Record Plant Studios in Los Angeles, Sarm West Studios in London, and Criteria Studios in Miami.
- Mastered at Sterling Sound Studios in New York City.
- Programmed and Mixed at Storm-Circle Entertainment.
- Timbaland appears courtesy of Blackground Records
- Justin Timberlake appears courtesy of Jive Records
- Webo Girl Publishing, Inc. (ASCAP), All Rights o/b/o Webo Girl Publishing, Inc. Admin. By WBmusic Corp. (ASCAP)
- Warner Bros. Music Corp. (ASCAP) and Virginia Beach Music (ASCAP), Admin. By WBmusic Corp. (ASCAP)
- Tennman Tunes, Admin. Byuniversal Music – Z Tunes LLC (ASCAP), o/b/o Justin Timberlake
- W.B.M. Music Corp. (Sesac)& Danjahandz Muzik (Sesac), Admin. By W.B.M.Music Corp. (ASCAP)

=== Personnel ===
- Madonna – songwriter, vocals, producer
- Timbaland – songwriter, producer
- Justin Timberlake – songwriter, producer, background vocals, guitar
- Danja – producer, writer
- Demacio "Demo" Castellon – recording, programming, audio mixing
- Marcella "Ms. Lago" Araica – recording
- Chris Gehringer – audio mastering
- Ron Taylor – Pro Tools editing
- Dan Warner – guitar
- Hannon Lane – additional keyboards
- Julian Vasquez – assistant engineering
- Vadim Chislov – assistant engineering
- Graham Archer – assistant engineering
- Fareed Salamah – assistant engineering
- Jose Castellon – recording and mixing assistant
- Joseph Castellon – recording and mixing assistant

== Charts ==
=== Weekly charts ===
Weekly chart performance for "Miles Away"
Chart (2008–2009)	Peak position
Australian Dance (ARIA Charts)	28
Austria (Ö3 Austria Top 40)	21
Belgium (Ultratop 50 Flanders)	31
Belgium (Ultratop 50 Wallonia)	39
Canada Hot 100 (Billboard)	23
Canada AC (Billboard)	24
Canada Hot AC (Billboard)	39
Czech Republic Airplay (ČNS IFPI)	5
Denmark (Tracklisten)	39
Finland (Suomen virallinen lista)	11
France (SNEP)	54
Germany (GfK)	11
Germany Airplay (BVMI)	3
Global Dance Songs (Billboard)	2
Hungary (Rádiós Top 40)	2
Italy (FIMI)	26
Japan Hot 100 (Billboard)	7
Netherlands (Dutch Top 40)	10
Netherlands (Single Top 100)	9
Romania (Romanian Top 100)	9
Russia Airplay (TopHit)	26
Scottish Singles Sales (Official Charts)	15
Slovakia Airplay (ČNS IFPI)	3
Spain (Promusicae)	1
Sweden (Sverigetopplistan)	25
Switzerland (Schweizer Hitparade)	32
UK Singles (Official Charts)	39
US Dance Club Songs (Billboard)	2
US Dance Singles Sales (Billboard)	1
US Dance Airplay (Billboard)	1
US Hot Singles Sales (Billboard)	1
Venezuela (Record Report)	67

=== Year-end charts ===
2008 year-end chart performance for "Miles Away"
Chart (2008)	Position
CIS (TopHit)	138
Hungary (Rádiós Top 40)	61
Japan (Japan Hot 100)	67
Netherlands (Dutch Top 40)	43
Netherlands (Single Top 100)	95

2009 year-end chart performance for "Miles Away"
Chart (2009)	Position
Brazil (Crowley)	84
CIS (TopHit)	95
European Hot 100 (Billboard)	100
Hungary (Rádiós Top 40)	38
Russia Airplay (TopHit)	128
US Dance Club Songs (Billboard)	28
US Hot Dance Airplay (Billboard)	11

== Certifications ==
Certifications and sales for "Miles Away"
Region	Certification	Certified units/sales
Japan (RIAJ)	Platinum	250,000^{*}
Japan (RIAJ) Ringtone	2× Platinum	500,000^{*}
^{*} Sales figures based on certification alone.

== Release history ==
Release dates and formats for "Miles Away"
Region	Date	Format(s)	Label(s)	Ref.
Germany	November 21, 2008	CD; maxi CD	Warner Music	
United Kingdom	November 24, 2008	12-inch vinyl; CD	Warner Bros.	
France	December 5, 2008	Maxi CD	Warner Music	
Argentina	December 12, 2008	Maxi CD	Warner Music	
United States	December 16, 2008	Maxi CD	Warner Bros.	
United States	January 27, 2009	12-inch vinyl	Warner Bros.	
Various	August 11, 2009	Digital download (EP)	Warner Bros.	

== See also ==
- List of number-one singles of 2008 (Spain)
- List of number-one dance airplay hits of 2008 (U.S.)
- List of best-selling singles in Japan
