= Before There Was =

Studio album by Bellarive
- Released: July 22, 2014
- Genre: Contemporary Christian, contemporary worship, Christian rock
- Length: 60:17
- Label: Sparrow
- Producer: Nathan Dantzler, Joshua Silverberg

Bellarive chronology
The Heartbeat (2012)	Before There Was (2014)

Before There Was is the second and final studio album by American contemporary worship music group Bellarive. The album was released via Sparrow Records on July 22, 2014.

== Contents ==
Production was handled by Nathan Dantzler and Joshua Silverberg.

== Critical reception ==
Professional ratings
Review scores
Source	Rating
365 Days of Inspiring Media	4.5/5 stars
CCM Magazine	3/5 stars
Christian Music Review	3.5/5 stars
Cross Rhythms	8/10 squares
Jesus Freak Hideout	4/5 stars 3.5/5 stars
Louder Than the Music	5/5 stars
New Release Tuesday	5/5 stars
Worship Leader	4.5/5 stars

Writing for Worship Leader, Jeremy Armstrong depicts that "Bellarive craft atmospheric worship with glorious musical builds and fantastic musical eruptions that praise God in musical prosody as much as in lyrical poetry." On behalf of Cross Rhythms, Chris Webb suggests "this is rock and praise with substance." Grace Aspinwall explains that some tunes are "Fresh and innovative" yet others "exude joy and light."

Writing for New Release Tuesday, Caitlin Lassiter exclaims "Before There Was is a huge step for Bellarive... certainly the most exciting and promising worship album we've seen so far this year, and is sure to be categorized as one of the best of all time." On behalf of Jesus Freak Hideout, Roger Gelwicks portrays that "A rich look at the gospel's power, Before There Was is a distinct highlight for this summer's playlist." Mark Rice derides that "It is a fairly solid worship album with several stunning moments, but it simply sounds like they are trying to satisfy a bit too large of an audience than they are meant to."

April Covington advises that "As you listen to Before There Was, you'll be dancing for joy over God's glory and grace." Writing for Louder Than the Music, Jono Davies describes that "they are fitting into their new bigger, bolder shoes much more comfortably. There is definitely no second album worry from the most exciting band around at the moment." On behalf of 365 Days of Inspiring Media, Jonathan Andre advocates that "Before There Was is a great album, and one that genuinely surprised me with its ability to bring listeners, myself included, into a place of reverence and adoration... Well done guys for such a well thought out and enjoyable album".

== Track listing ==
No.	Title	Writer(s)	Length
1.	"Let There Be Light"	Seán Curran, Matt Maher, Joshua Silverberg	4:29
2.	"Your Great Love"	Jess Cates, Seán Curran	4:33
3.	"Calling on Fire"	Seán Curran, Nathan Dantzler, Joshua Silverberg	6:30
4.	"Lazarus"	Seán Curran	5:04
5.	"Save Us"	Seán Curran, Josh Luker, Melissa Mage, Michael Mage	6:35
6.	"I Belong to You"	Seán Curran	4:52
7.	"Bring Us Back"	Seán Curran, Justin Ebach	3:38
8.	"Chains"	Seán Curran, Brett Younker	5:12
9.	"Hallelujah, to Saving Grace"	Jess Cates, Seán Curran	4:44
10.	"Only You Can Raise the Dead"	Jess Cates, Seán Curran	6:20
11.	"Caught in the Middle"	Seán Curran, Zach Glotfelty	3:54
12.	"From the Very Start"	Seán Curran	4:26
Total length:			60:17

== Chart performance ==
Chart (2014)	Peak position
US Christian Albums (Billboard)	11
US Heatseekers Albums (Billboard)	8
