= Bellarive =

American Christian pop rock band

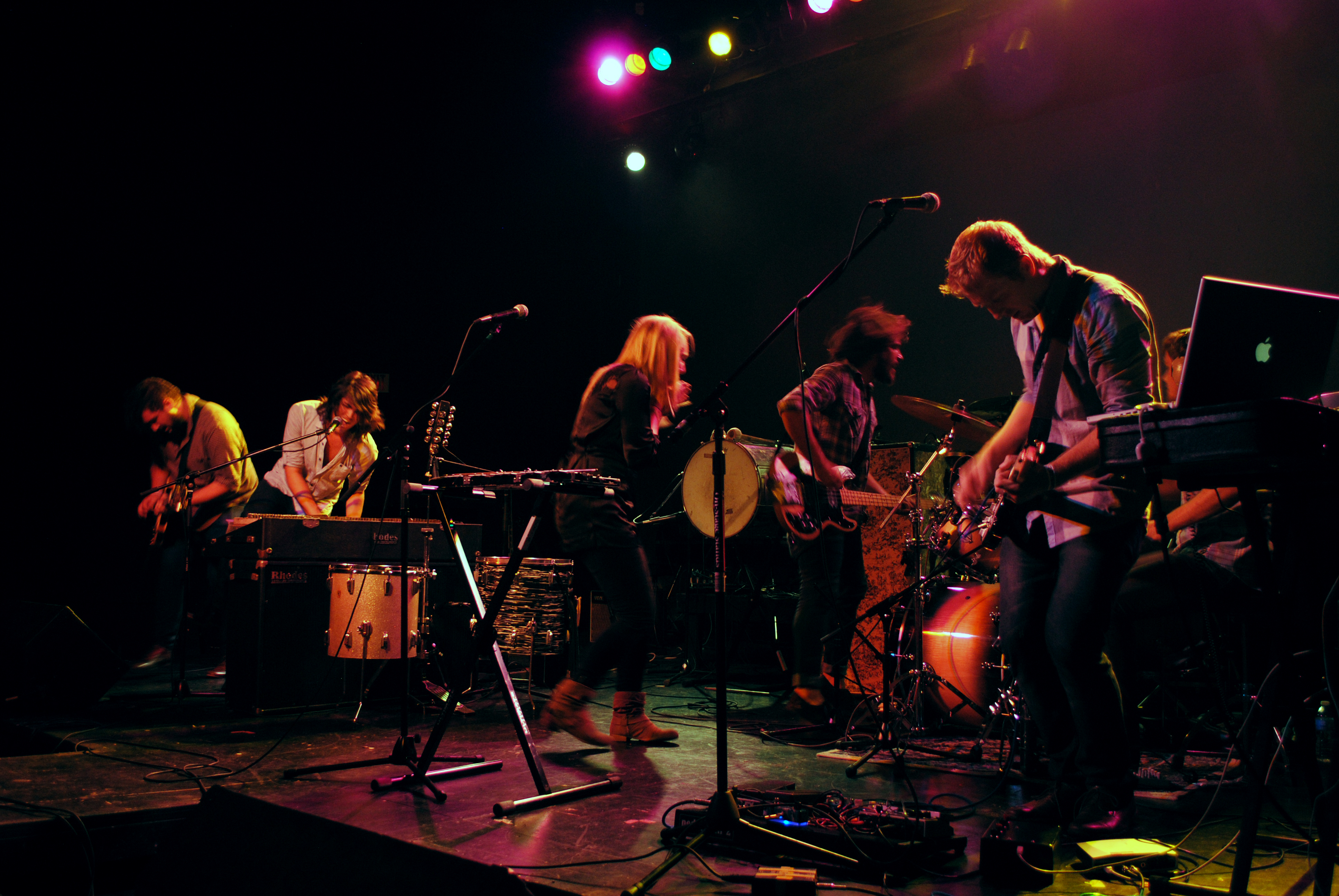
- Bellarive live at the Murray Hill Theatre in 2011.

Background information
- Origin: Orlando, Florida
- Genres: Contemporary Christian music; pop rock; electronic worship
- Years active: 2009–2017
- Label: Sparrow
- Members: Sean Curran; Melissa Mage; Mike Mage; Josh Luker; Kenny Werner; Ben Burnley
- Past members: Zach Glotfelty
- Website: bellarive.com

Bellarive was a Christian pop rock band that originated in Orlando, Florida in 2009. The band is composed of Sean Curran (vocals, keys and guitar), Melissa Mage (vocals and percussion), Mike Mage (programming, guitar and vocals), Zach Glotffelty (lead guitar), Josh Luker (bass guitar and percussion) and Kenny Werner (drums). After one self-released EP, they signed to Sparrow Records in May 2012, and released their debut studio album The Heartbeat on June 19, 2012. This album peaked on the Billboard Christian Albums chart at No. 21 and on the Heatseekers Albums chart at No. 17. Their second studio album, Before There Was, was released on July 22, 2014. They disbanded December 23, 2017.

== Discography ==
=== Studio albums ===
- The Heartbeat (2012)
- Before There Was (2014)

=== EPs ===
- The Being Human Project...Start Listening (2009)

=== Singles ===
- "Love Has Found Us" (2010)
- "Sing" (2011)
- "Taste of Eternity" (2012)
- "Bring Us Back" (2014)
