= Hard Candy (Madonna album) =

2008 studio album by Madonna

Studio album by Madonna
- Released: April 18, 2008
- Recorded: 2007
- Studios: Record Plant (Los Angeles); Sarm West (London); Criteria (Miami)
- Genre: Dance-pop
- Length: 56:22
- Label: Warner Bros.
- Producers: Madonna; Danja; The Neptunes; Timbaland; Justin Timberlake

Madonna chronology
The Confessions Tour (2007)	Hard Candy (2008)	Celebration (2009)

Singles from Hard Candy
- 1. "4 Minutes" Released: March 17, 2008; 2. "Give It 2 Me" Released: June 24, 2008; 3. "Miles Away" Released: November 21, 2008

Hard Candy is the eleventh studio album by American singer and songwriter Madonna. It was released on April 18, 2008, by Warner Bros. Records. Hard Candy was her last album with the company after a 25-year history until Confessions II (2026). Madonna began working on Hard Candy in early 2007, and collaborated with Justin Timberlake, Timbaland, the Neptunes, and Nate "Danja" Hills to produce a dance-pop album incorporating hip hop, electropop, disco, electro, funk, and R&B.

For the album's creation, Madonna wanted to portray an alter-ego called the "black Madonna", but it was later scrapped to avoid controversy. Critical reaction was generally favorable, and Hard Candy debuted at number one in 37 countries worldwide, becoming the year's eleventh best-selling album, exceeding 4 million copies.

The album spawned three singles. The lead single, "4 Minutes", was a worldwide success, topping the charts in 21 countries and becoming Madonna's 37th Billboard Hot 100 top-ten hit. "Give It 2 Me" was released as the second single, and "Miles Away" as its third. Madonna performed in small venues in three cities to promote the album. She subsequently embarked on the Sticky & Sweet Tour, which became the highest-grossing concert tour by a female artist at the time.

== Background and development ==
In February 2007, Timbaland said that he was working with Madonna for her upcoming eleventh studio album. It was Madonna's last studio album for Warner Bros. Records, and following the release of a greatest hits collection (Celebration), she would join Live Nation Artists, a new initiative launched by concert promoter Live Nation. The 10-year deal with Live Nation encompassed all of Madonna's future music and music-related businesses, including the exploitation of the Madonna brand, new studio albums, touring, merchandising, fan clubs/Web sites, DVDs, music-related television and film projects and associated sponsorship agreements. In August 2007, Timbaland spoke about the development of the album to MTV News. Together he and Justin Timberlake were confirmed to have worked on the album with Madonna and said that they wrote ten songs for her. Songs confirmed to have been developed were "La, La" and "Candy Shop", which was written by Pharrell Williams. Timbaland added,

"Me and Justin did the records. [Madonna's] got a hot album. Her album is up there with Justin's album. [...] Ah, man, there's this one song, we taking it back to 'You must be my luck-eee starrrr!' ... Remember 'Ugly' by Bubba Sparxxx? I got a beat similar to that. The hook is no words. It's saying stuff named after coffee... The name of the song is 'La, La'. Pharrell did a hot one for her too called 'Candy Shop'."

Timbaland finished off by saying that the title of the album was not decided then, but he had to reconvene with Madonna to complete the record by September 2007. MTV described the new album as moving in an urban direction. It had initially been defined as having "a lot of producers from a lot of genres in there." Pet Shop Boys were originally asked by Warner to write and produce some songs for the album. Timbaland referred to the album as being "like 'Holiday' with an R&B groove".

== Recording ==
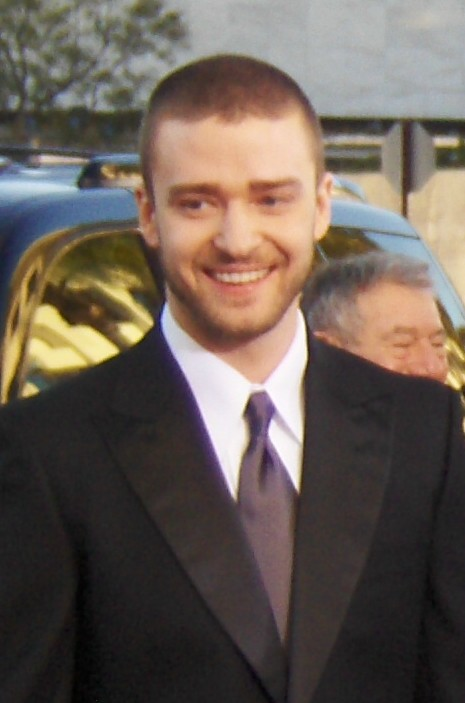
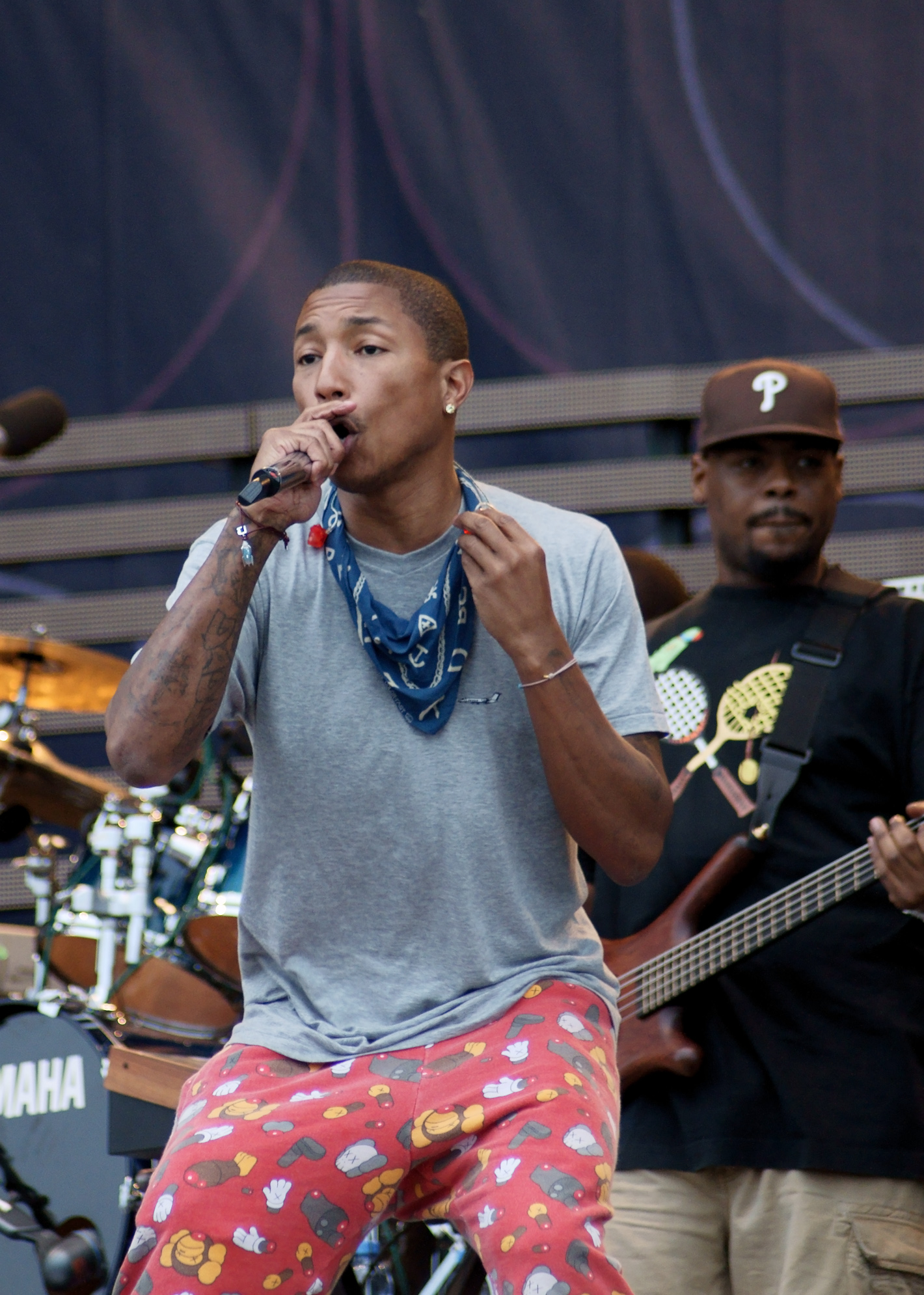
Justin Timberlake (left) and Pharrell Williams (right) collaborated with Madonna on the album.

Hard Candy features additional vocals by Timberlake, Timbaland, Williams and Kanye West and production by Madonna, Timbaland, Timberlake, the Neptunes and Nate "Danja" Hills. Previously, Madonna had worked with relatively unknown producers like William Orbit, Mirwais Ahmadzaï and Stuart Price. However, for Hard Candy, Madonna decided to collaborate with producers and artists who were already well-known. Talking to MTV, Madonna explained her decision to collaborate with well-known producers: "Because they're good, and I like their shit. [...] I mean, I don't like to repeat myself, and I was sitting around thinking, 'What music do I love right now?' And it was actually [Timberlake's] record FutureSex/LoveSounds. [...] I was listening to it obsessively."

Madonna had already started work on the album with Williams, and during one of her breaks from recording, her manager Guy Oseary spoke to Timberlake, suggesting that it "would be cool" if he recorded some songs with her. Timberlake commented "'That would be awesome', but I thought, 'That'll never happen', [...] But it's a testament to Pharrell. He had already laid the groundwork where she was going with it. She played 'Candy Shop' for me, and a couple of other songs, and I thought, 'What a cool direction'. I thought she could essentially do the whole record with Pharrell if she wanted to, and I asked Tim, 'How do we fit in?' And it basically came down to how we did my record, co-producing, and just throwing Madonna in the mix." The first track recorded by Madonna and Timberlake was "Devil Wouldn't Recognize You". Timberlake felt that the song, which Madonna had been working on for years before the Hard Candy project, was comparable to "Frozen" (1998). He wanted to turn the line "'The devil wouldn't recognize you, but I do" into a catchy hook and make it sound like a concept.

Timberlake was impressed by the amount of recording material Madonna would already have ready. He said that he does not normally write down his lyrics, since the ideas come faster to him, but Madonna had "all these thoughts, riddles, poems, feelings, all written in huge notebooks ... she kept handing them over. It was amazing, taking these little bits here and there and putting them together like a puzzle." For recording "Miles Away", Timberlake played a guitar riff for Madonna and asked "How do we want to do this? What do we want it to be about? What do we want to say?" Madonna decided to have discussions between herself and Timberlake to develop other ideas for the songs. One of the ideas they connected on was the universality of long-distance relationships, which they felt was too personal for them, but nevertheless used the concept in "Miles Away". Madonna commented on the recorded version: "We put our stuff out there. [...] And after we did the song, everybody in the studio was like, 'Oh, I can relate to that'."

== Music structure and composition ==
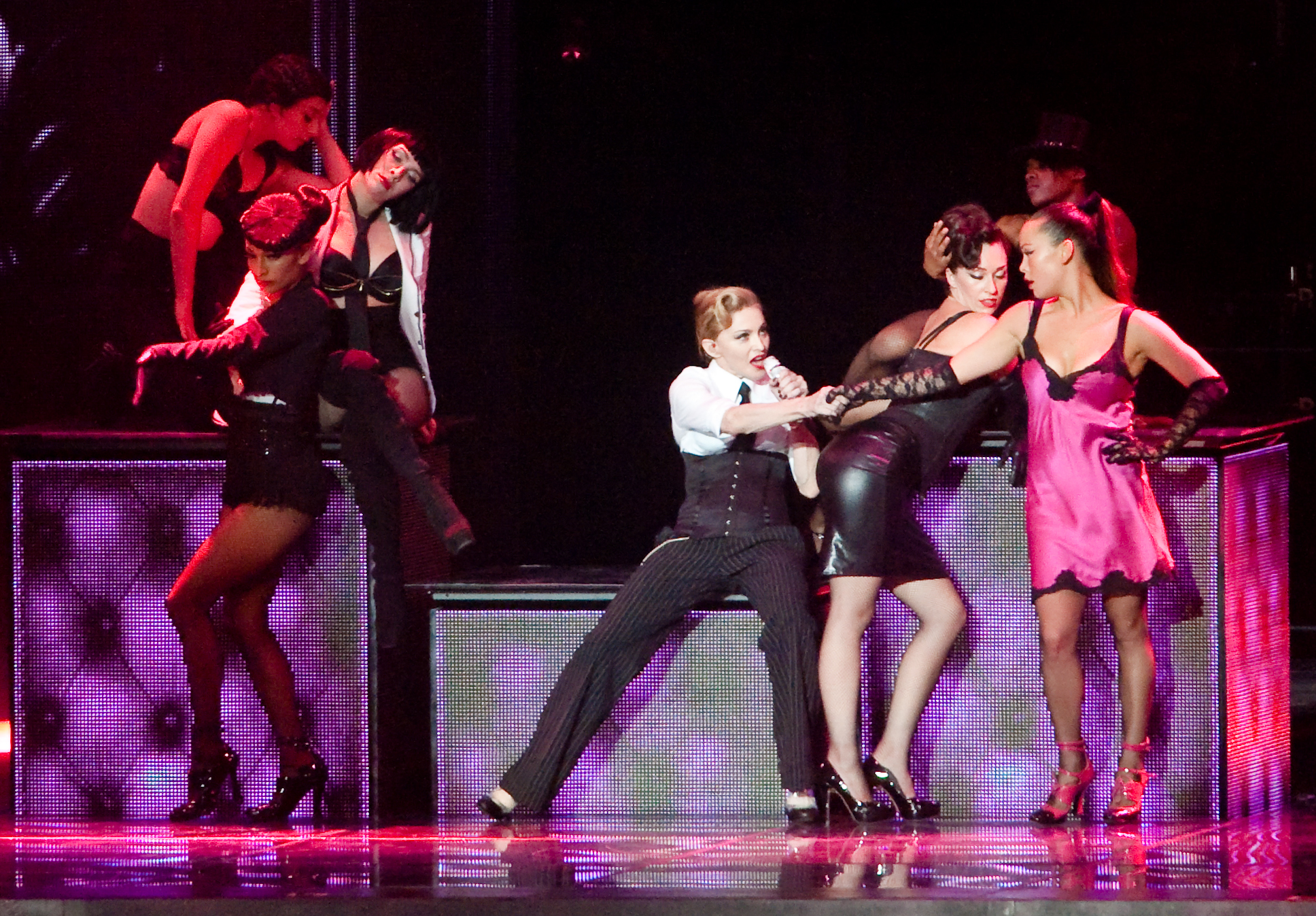
Madonna performing the album's opening track, "Candy Shop", during the MDNA Tour

With Interview magazine, Madonna explained her inspirations behind the songs and the music of Hard Candy. She said that "probably in many respects most of the songs [on Hard Candy] are [autobiographical]. But in more of an unconscious way. I don't really think about telling personal stories when I'm writing music. It just comes. And then a lot of times, six months later, eight months later, I go, 'Oh, that's what I wrote that song about.' But that's when I play the song for lots of people and they all go, 'Oh, I can totally relate to that'." Sonically, Hard Candy is a dance-pop, pop, hip hop, electropop, disco, electro, funk and R&B record.

"Candy Shop" is the opening track of the album. Produced by The Neptunes, the song uses the word candy as a metaphor for sex. Williams said, "We were just in a studio, [...] and [Madonna] was like, 'Look, give me some hot shit.' I was looking at her like, 'She's saying hot shit?' She was like, 'What?' And I'm like, 'OK.' So we just worked and made it." The first single from the album, "4 Minutes", was initially known as "4 Minutes to Save the World". The song's development was motivated by a sense of urgency to save the planet from destruction, and how people can enjoy themselves in the process. According to Madonna, the song inspired her to produce the documentary I Am Because We Are. The song features vocals by Timberlake and Timbaland. An uptempo dance song with an urban, hip hop style, it also incorporates Timbaland's bhangra beats. The instrumentation used in the song includes brass, foghorns and cow bells. The song's lyrics carry a message of social awareness, inspired by Madonna's visit to Africa and the human suffering she witnessed.

"Miles Away" is a song most people who work can relate to. If part of your work is travelling, and the person you are with also works and travels, you find yourself separated a lot and it can be very frustrating, [...] I'm American and he [Guy Ritchie] is British, and I have to come to America all the time. [...] Especially at the beginning of our relationship, that long-distance thing was very frustrating. I also think it's easier for people to say things from a distance; it's safer. In 'Miles Away' I'm tapping into the global consciousness of people who have intimacy problems.

— Madonna talking about the inspiration behind "Miles Away"

In "Give It 2 Me", the album's second single, Madonna merged bounce-beats and a funky bassline. "If it's against the law, arrest me", she sings "If you can handle it, undress me." The song has a short interlude where Madonna continuously repeats the words "Get stupid", as Williams chants, "To the left, to the right". "Give It 2 Me" was written by Madonna as an anthemic, self-manifesto song which, although it appears to be about dance and sex, is a reference to Madonna's career spanning three decades in the music industry. Musically it is an upbeat dance song, featuring instrumentation from West African percussion and cowbells. Backing vocals are provided by Williams. The fourth track, "Heartbeat", has Madonna singing breathlessly and also features an interlude where the music changes from its normal rhythm, just the sound of drums.

MTV said that "Miles Away", the third single from the album, was the most deceptively simple track because although it appeared straightforward on the surface, it had a lot of technical tricks underneath it. The song departs from the dance theme of the album and deals with the difficulties of long-distance relationships. "Miles Away" is a melancholy electronic ballad, which, according to Madonna is autobiographical, and is inspired by her then-husband Guy Ritchie. The relationship themed lyrics continue in the next track "She's Not Me", which talks about Madonna being emulated by another woman, hence she utters the line "She started dressing like me and talking like me, It freaked me out, She started calling you up in the middle of the night, What's that about?"

The next track "Incredible" starts off like a love song and then transforms into a plea to someone to return to a relationship. The song changes rhythm at the interlude to mimic this change in tone. In a promotional interview, Madonna described the song as full of "angst and desire" and "wanting to get back to a feeling of happiness and fulfillment," but also containing a feeling of abandonment. In a review of the album on MTV, the shift in the structure of the song reflected Madonna's own confusion about how she felt about her lover in the song. "Can't get my head around it", she sang. "I, I need to think about it." "Beat Goes On", featuring West, has a '70s R&B meeting '80s dance vibe and a rap interlude by West. Williams has commented that Madonna's work ethic was different from other artists that he had worked with before. That is reflected in songs like "Spanish Lesson" where she sings the line "If you do your homework/ Baby I will give you more". It also has influences of Spanish music. Groove inspired music is present in "Dance 2Night", which featured Timberlake.

"Devil Wouldn't Recognize You" was written by Madonna before the Hard Candy project started. The song has a sense of mystery and starts off softly and slowly with a piano introduction. It then becomes fast and melancholy, with Madonna singing: "Your eyes are full of surprises/ They cannot predict my fate". The trip hop inspired "Voices" is the last track of the album, consisting of unresolved chords and sweeping strings, as the lyrics question who is really in control: "Are you walking the dog?/ Is the dog walking you?"

== Release and artwork ==
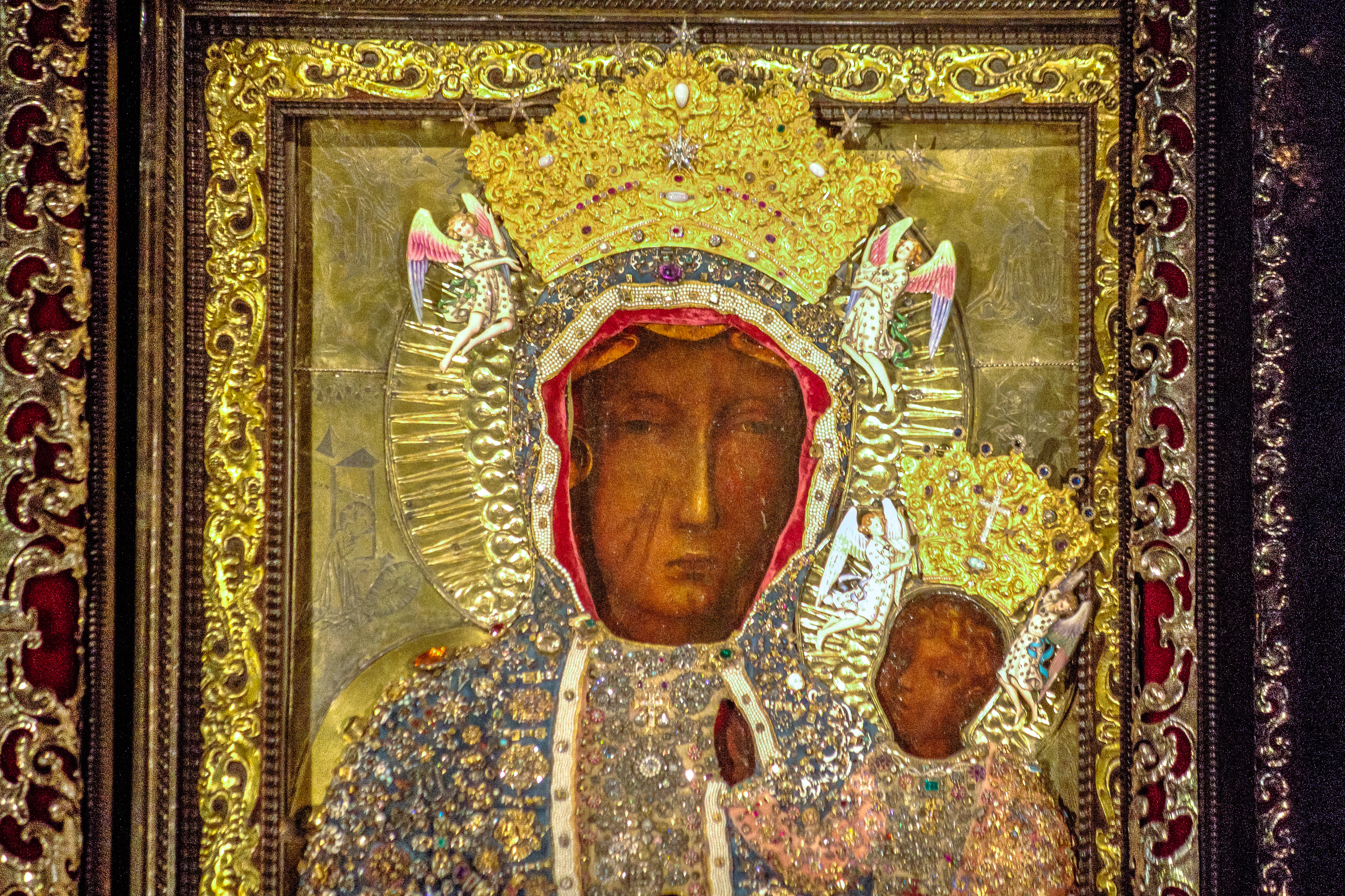
Madonna wanted to portray herself as the Black Madonna for the cover art, but rejected the idea.

Hard Candy was released on April 25, 2008, in the European countries of Germany, Ireland, Austria, Italy and Netherlands. On April 28, the album was released in the United Kingdom, Brazil and throughout the rest of Europe, and on April 29, in the United States, Mexico and Canada. Before its official announcement, Billboard reported that the title of the album was Licorice, as announced on the Sirius Satellite Radio programme OutQ. In an interview with MTV Australia, Madonna explained that a prominent theme of the Hard Candy album was about incorporating the image of a boxer, an idea which has been repeated within the song "Give It 2 Me". According to her, "['Give It 2 Me'] is basically [opposite in meaning]. I'm not [...], 'give me all you got' [kind of person], so it's quite a sort of tough stance." Hence, initially Madonna decided that the title of the song was to be used for the then-unnamed album. This was changed following the release of a similarly named song by Timbaland. After that, Madonna decided to call the album Black Madonna, and even shot a photograph for the cover art, wearing black make-up with white eyes. In a 2009 interview with Rolling Stone, Madonna commented:

"I did a photoshoot with Steven Klein for my last album cover, and I painted my face black, except for red lips and white eyes. It was a play on words. Have you ever heard of the Black Madonna? It has layers of meaning and for a minute, I thought it would be a fun title for my record. Then I thought, 'Twenty-five per cent of the world might get this, probably less, it's not worth it.' It happens all the time, because my references are usually off the Richter scale."

The title of the album was finally confirmed by MTV as Hard Candy. Madonna's representative Liz Rosenberg told Entertainment Weekly: "She loves candy, [...] [The title is] about the juxtaposition of tough and sweetness, or as Madonna so eloquently expressed: 'I'm gonna kick your ass, but it's going to make you feel good'." The album cover art was also released at the same time and featured Madonna with short cropped hair in a black leotard with a professional wrestling championship belt across her waist. The belt includes the inscription "Give It to Me", the original title of the album. The backdrop displayed pink peppermint swirls.

== Promotion ==
Seven songs from the album were made available for download by mobile phone during the week prior to the album's official release. Beginning on April 21 and ending on April 27, 2008, the songs "Candy Shop", "Miles Away", "Give It 2 Me", "Heartbeat", "Beat Goes On", "Devil Wouldn't Recognize You" and "She's Not Me" were distributed. Additionally, Hard Candy and the "4 Minutes" music video were pre-loaded onto the Samsung F400 in France. In other markets, Vodafone and Warner Music International made an arrangement which saw the music and other forms of mobile content from Hard Candy available exclusively to Vodafone mobile customers prior to the album's general release. A similar deal was made with Sony Ericsson, who offered the album pre-loaded onto their phones in 27 countries worldwide. Hard Candy was also streamed on MySpace four days before its United States release. Furthermore, the season finale of Ugly Betty's second season, "Jump", solely featured Madonna's music. "Candy Shop", "Spanish Lesson", "She's Not Me" and "Miles Away" were played, as well as the 2006 single "Jump". "Miles Away" was also used in the Japanese TV drama Change.

=== Hard Candy Promo Tour ===
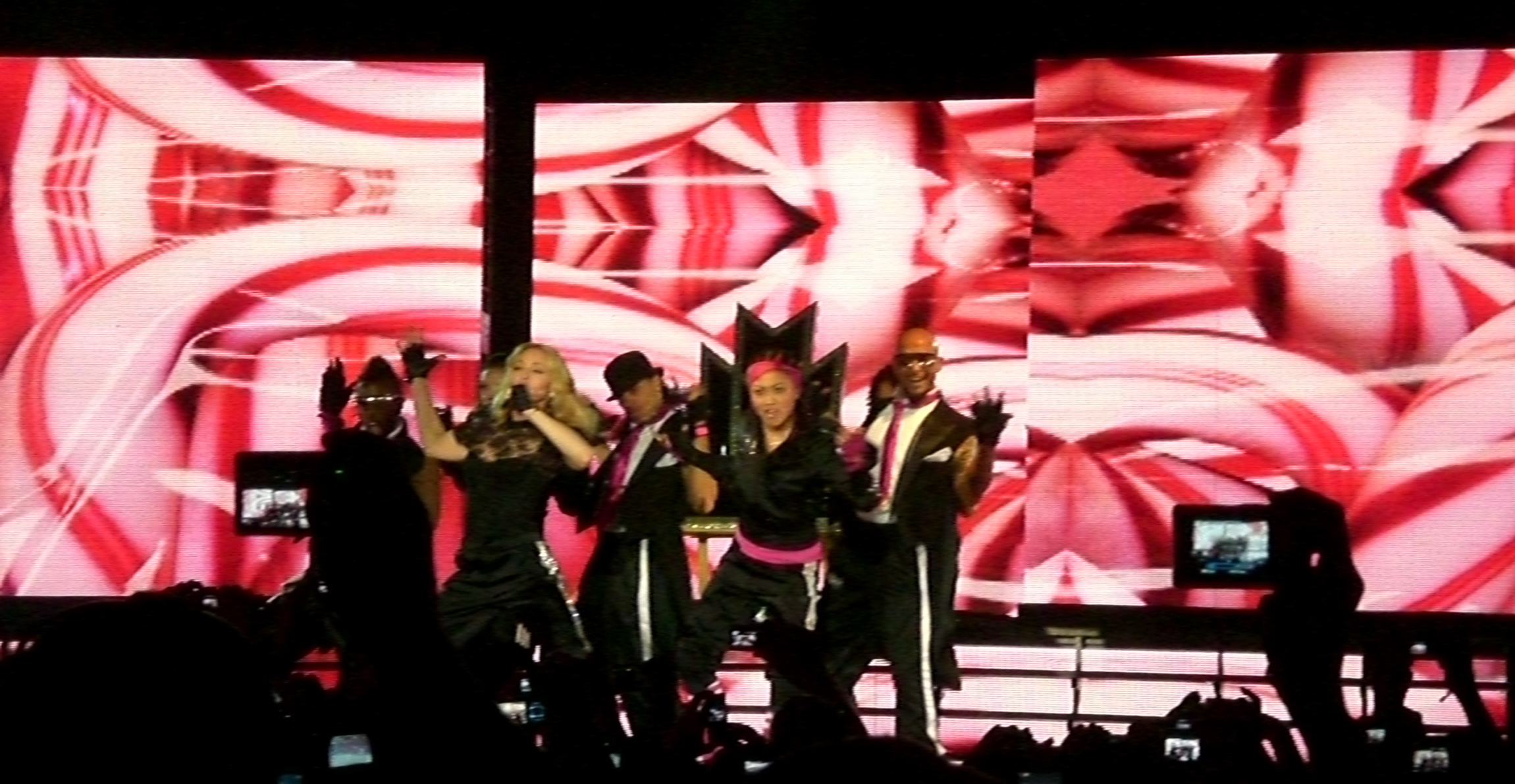
Madonna and her dancers opening the Hard Candy Promo Tour with a performance of "Candy Shop"

Following the album's release, Madonna went on a promotional tour for the album, which was the first venture as part of her new contract with concert promoters Live Nation with media content provided by "Frank the Plumber LLC". The show consisted of a 40-minute set featuring six songs, with dates in New York City, Paris and Maidstone. In an interview with the BBC, Madonna stated:

"Obviously, I want to do new stuff because I'm very excited about it. I feel that's what people come to hear but I also want to do a few of my oldies but goodies. I chose "Hung Up" because that was the biggest hit from my last record and I chose "Music" because it's a crowd pleaser, it's anthemic and it brings people together."

The show had an expandable, five-platform stage which displayed the album's cover art. Madonna, wearing a skintight black suit and a lace top, appeared on the stage while sitting on a throne with a golden walking stick, as the music of "Candy Shop" started. Images of confectionery flashed on the television screens flanking the back of the stage. Madonna, along with her six dancers, gyrated in choreographed dance moves. Next, Madonna strapped on an acoustic guitar, took a swig from a champagne bottle and started singing "Miles Away", as images of planes taking off and landing, airports and various locations around the globe were projected across the screens behind her. After that "4 Minutes" was performed, which mimicked its video with a flashing countdown clock. Then Madonna paused for a moment to thank her collaborators, including Timberlake, West, Timbaland and others. "I feel like the luckiest girl in the world", she said, before dedicating the next song, "Hung Up" from 2005's Confessions on a Dance Floor, to her fans. The song was mixed with the Rolling Stones track "(I Can't Get No) Satisfaction". It was followed by "Give It 2 Me", during which pink and green disco beams pulsated across the crowd. The show ended with a performance of "Music" (2000), during which her dancers emerged from a false, silver subway car door. Madonna danced across the stage, touching the hands of the audience and ended the show by racing up the stage to the subway doors, behind which she disappeared.

Chris Harris from MTV reviewed the show at Roseland Ballroom, New York, and commented that, "It was an event better-suited for Madison Square Garden and one that these fans — many of whom probably had to call a sitter for the evening — won't soon forget." Ben Sisario from The New York Times commented, "for Madonna's fans, [the New York show] proved that seeing her for free in a 2,200-capacity hall — minuscule by her usual touring standards — was something worth waiting for. And waiting for a very long time." Silvio Pietrolungo from Billboard felt that "The crowd of 2,200 was certainly dedicated." The April 30, 2008, New York set was shown live via MSN in association with Control Room and Live Nation. It was broadcast internationally on May 15, 2008. The Maidstone show faced problems with the organisers due to Madonna's use of swearing, causing complaints to be made to the BBC when the show was aired on Radio 1.

=== Sticky & Sweet Tour ===
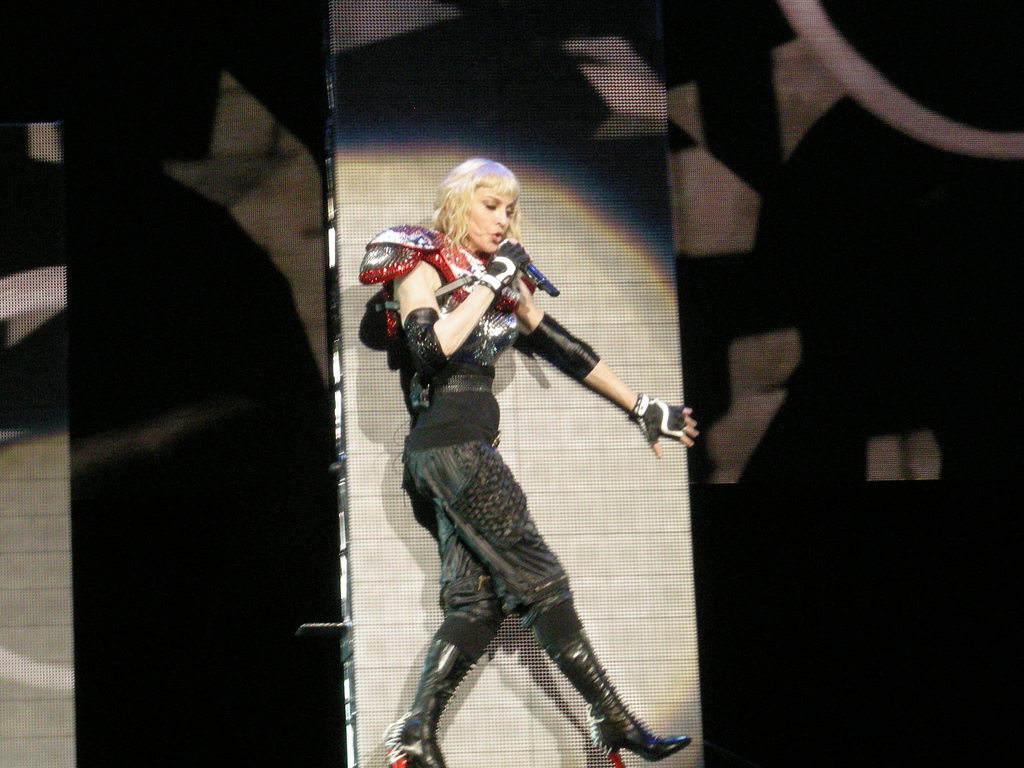
Madonna performing Hard Candy's lead single, "4 Minutes", during the Sticky & Sweet Tour

To further promote the album, Madonna embarked on the Sticky & Sweet Tour, her eighth worldwide concert tour. It began in August 2008 and was Madonna's first tour from her new recording and business deal with Live Nation. The tour was announced in May 2008, with dates for American and British venues revealed. Though initially planned, the tour failed to visit Australia due to financial problems and the financial recession. Costume designer Arianne Phillips designed the costumes, supported by a number of famous designers and brands, namely Givenchy, Stella McCartney, Yves Saint Laurent, Roberto Cavalli, and Jeremy Scott. The stage for the main show was planned similarly to that of her 2006 Confessions Tour. After the Sticky & Sweet Tour concluded in 2008, Madonna announced plans to begin a second European leg in 2009 to perform in cities she had either never been to, or had not played for a long time.

The tour was described as a "rock driven dancetastic journey". It was divided into four acts: Pimp, where S&M was the main theme, Retro where Madonna's classic songs were performed alongside displays of the work of deceased artist Keith Haring, Gypsy, a fusion of Romani folk music and dance, with performances ranging from melancholy to joyous, and Rave, where she performed track's featuring Eastern influences. The show ended with a sing-along of the final song with the audience. Some changes were made to the set list during the second European leg of the tour in 2009, including a dance tribute to deceased singer Michael Jackson. The tour generated positive reviews from critics.

The Sticky & Sweet Tour broke many records in terms of ticket sales, commercial gross and audience attendance. At the time of the first leg's conclusion, it became the highest-grossing tour by a solo artist, earning $282 million, breaking the previous record Madonna herself held with her Confessions Tour. Overall, Madonna performed to over 3.5 million fans in 32 countries, grossing a total of US$408 million, making it also the third highest-grossing tour by a solo act and the highest-grossing tour by a female artist. At the 2009 Billboard Touring Awards, the Sticky & Sweet Tour won the Top Tour and Top Draw prizes, which acknowledge the highest-grossing and highest-attended tours of the year, respectively. Madonna's manager Guy Oseary won the Top Manager award.

=== Singles ===
"4 Minutes" was released as the lead single from the album on March 17, 2008, by Warner Bros. Records. "4 Minutes" has been praised by many contemporary critics. Some have noted, however, that it was Madonna rather than Timberlake who appeared to be the featured artist on the track. "4 Minutes" achieved international success by topping the charts in 21 countries worldwide. It became Madonna's 13th number-one single in the United Kingdom, the highest total for any female artist in the British charts. In the United States, "4 Minutes" peaked at number three on the Billboard Hot 100, giving Madonna her 37th Top Ten hit, breaking the record previously held by Elvis Presley. In the song's accompanying music video, Madonna and Timberlake sing and run away from a giant black screen that devours everything in its path. At the end of the video, Madonna and Timberlake are consumed by the screen. The song received a Grammy nomination in the Best Pop Collaboration with Vocals category.

"Give It 2 Me" was released on June 4, 2008, by Warner Bros. Records as the second single from the album. The song received positive reviews from contemporary critics. It became Madonna's 39th number-one single on the Billboard Hot Dance Club Play chart. It charted on the Billboard Hot 100 for one week, and reached a peak of 57 only. The song topped the music charts in the Netherlands and Spain and attained top-ten positions on the charts of many other European nations. "Give It 2 Me" received a Grammy nomination in 2009 in the Best Dance Recording category.

"Miles Away" was released as the third and final single from the album, on October 17, 2008. It received positive appreciation from contemporary critics, though some of them noted its similarity to Timberlake's 2006 single, "What Goes Around... Comes Around". "Miles Away" reached the top forty in the official charts of United Kingdom, Canada, Belgium, and the Netherlands. The song did not appear on the official chart of the United States, but it was a success on the US dance charts, where it became Madonna's seventh consecutive number-one song on the Hot Dance Airplay chart, the most for any artist.

== Critical reception ==
Professional ratings
Aggregate scores
Source	Rating
Metacritic	65/100
Review scores
Source	Rating
AllMusic	2.5/5 stars
Blender	4/5 stars
Entertainment Weekly	B+
The Guardian	4/5 stars
NME	(5/10)
PopMatters	(5/10)
Rolling Stone	4/5 stars
Slant Magazine	3.5/5 stars
The Times	3/5 stars
Tom Hull – on the Web	B+

Hard Candy received generally favorable reviews. The album received a score of 65 out of 100 on Metacritic from 24 critics, which indicates "generally favorable reviews". Mark Savage from the BBC commented on the composition of the tracks, saying "if a handful of the tracks had been delivered to more producers with a touch more subtlety, Hard Candy could have ranked alongside Madonna's best. [...] Over and over again, she subsumes her pop sensibilities to their arsenal of clattering beats, hollered raps and over-fussy production." Stephen Thomas Erlewine from AllMusic felt that "There's a palpable sense of disinterest [in Hard Candy], as if she just handed the reins over to Pharrell and Timba-Lake, trusting them to polish up this piece of stale candy. Maybe she's not into the music, maybe she's just running out this last album for Warner before she moves onto the greener pastures of Live Nation—either way, Hard Candy is as a rare thing: a lifeless Madonna album."

Tom Young from Blender gave a positive review saying "On Hard Candy, she's like an aging master thief sneaking into the temple of pop goodies for one last big score. Album 11 is good-naturedly smutty, not confrontationally nasty, but it's a veritable filth bath compared to the C-SPAN sermons and confessional strumming of 2003's dreadful American Life or the woozily self-actualized club trance of 2005's Confessions on a Dance Floor." Kerri Mason from Billboard complimented the new sound and the musical direction taken by Madonna but felt that she had become a producer's puppet, leading her to comment that "Madonna makes producers, producers don't make Madonna." Chris Willman from Entertainment Weekly gave the album a B+ and said "[Madonna] makes it work with this surprisingly rejuvenated set." Mike Collett-White from Reuters reported: "As parting gifts go, Madonna's 11th studio album—and her last before she exits long-term record label Warner Bros.—is unusually generous, if early reviews are to be believed. [...] Hard Candy scored solidly among rock critics."

Caryn Ganz from Rolling Stone said that Hard Candy is the work of "a songwriting team of American chart royalty" that helps Madonna "revisit her roots as an urban-disco queen. [...] For Hard Candy, she lets top-shelf producers make her their plaything." Ben Thompson from The Guardian commented on the music by saying that "Hard Candy is a tough, nuggety confection offering plenty for listeners to get their teeth into. [...] Whenever [it] threatens to get boring, something always happens to recapture your interest." Sarah Hajibegari from The Times felt that while "Hard Candy is no disaster", the album's producers have "already done the same thing with Nelly Furtado, Britney Spears and Gwen Stefani." Andy Gill from The Independent said that the album portrayed Madonna as "how a once diverse talent has ossified into simply satisfying the sweet tooth of functional dance-pop." Thomas Hausner from PopMatters wrote that the album "is overpopulated with recycled pop that is indistinguishable and artificial, something Madonna's soothing arpeggiating vocals cannot alleviate".

Tom Ewing from Pitchfork wondered "after listening [to the album], the question's still open—nobody involved in Hard Candy is anywhere near their creative peak!" Sal Cinquemani from Slant Magazine was disappointed with the album and said, "Madonna hasn't delivered this many vapid floor fillers on one disc since her debut, and maybe not even then. [...] There are few confessions here—nothing political, nothing too spiritual, no talk of fame, war, or the media. It's just what America ordered." Wilfred Young from NME felt that Hard Candy was "a solid enough album by the standards of most pop tarts, but from the mistress of innovation? Pretty mediocre."

== Commercial performance ==
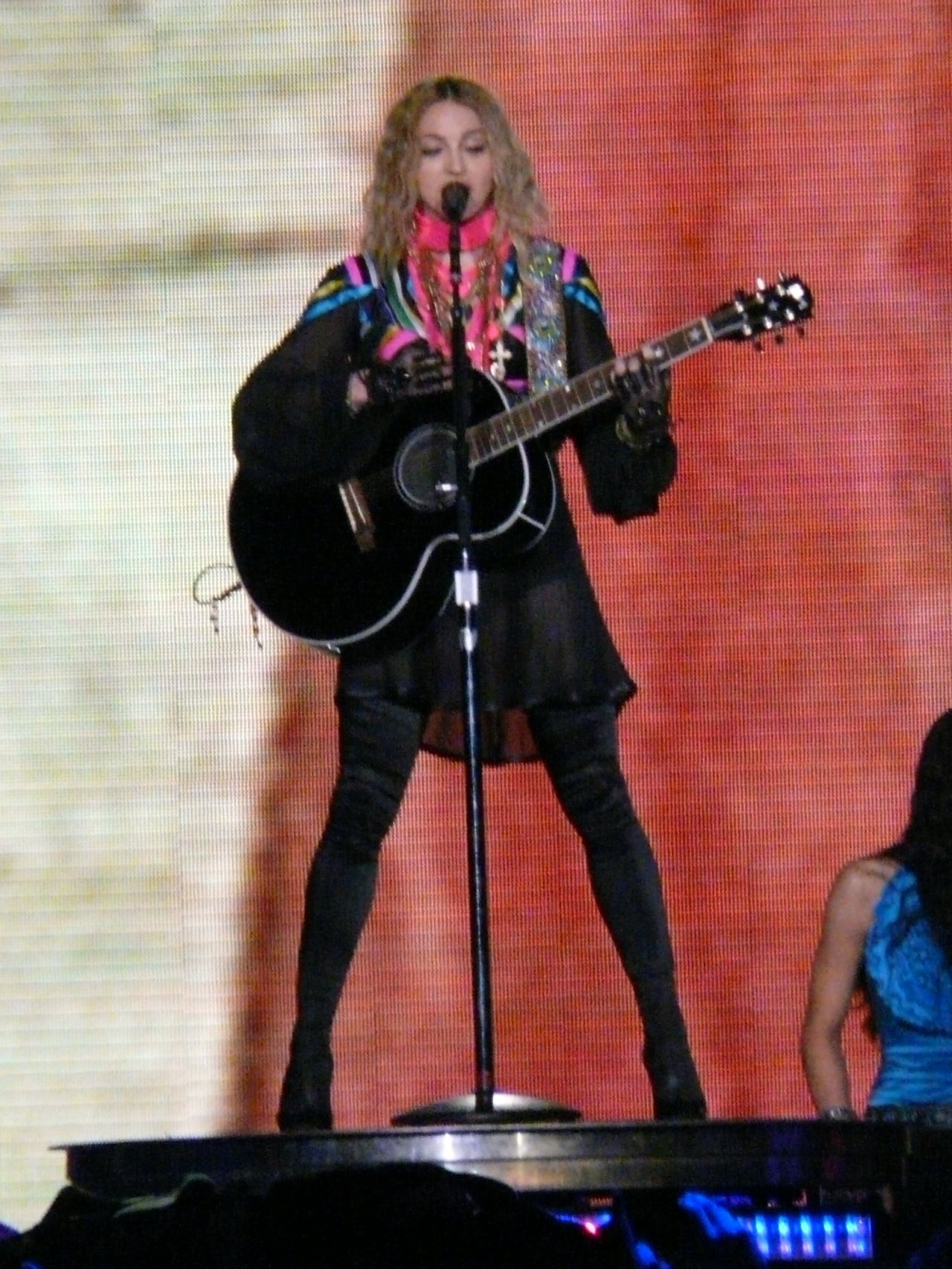
Madonna singing "Miles Away", the album's third single, on the Sticky & Sweet Tour. The song became her seventh consecutive number-one song on the Hot Dance Airplay chart, the most for any artist.

After its release, Hard Candy debuted at number-one in 37 countries and was the eleventh best-selling album worldwide in 2008, according to the International Federation of the Phonographic Industry. The album has sold more than four million copies worldwide. According to Nielsen SoundScan, Hard Candy sold 100,000 copies in the United States upon its first day of release. It debuted at number one on the Billboard 200 with over 280,000 copies sold. Hard Candy became Madonna's seventh number-one album, making her the female artist with the second most Billboard number one albums, behind only Barbra Streisand. The album was certified gold by the Recording Industry Association of America (RIAA) on June 4, 2008, for shipments of 500,000 copies in the United States. As of December 2016, Hard Candy has sold 751,000 copies. In Canada, the album debuted at the top of the Canadian Albums Chart and was certified platinum by the Music Canada (MC) for shipments of 80,000 copies. As of January 2009, the album sold 169,000 units in Canada according to Nielsen Company.

In Australia, Hard Candy became Madonna's seventh album to reach number one on the ARIA Albums Chart. The album was certified platinum by the Australian Recording Industry Association (ARIA) for shipments of 70,000 copies there. In New Zealand, Hard Candy debuted and peaked at number five on May 5, 2008, staying on the chart for nine weeks. The album debuted at number one on the Oricon weekly album chart in Japan, selling around 55,462 copies, retaining that position for a second week due to an increase of sales to almost 80,000 copies. Hard Candy was her first album to top the chart in 18 years since I'm Breathless (1990). Madonna also became the first international artist in Japanese chart history to have number-one albums in three consecutive decades. In Latin America, the album reached number three in Mexico and was certified platinum. In Argentina, the album reached the number one spot in the weekly charts and number three on the Monthly Album chart of CAPIF, and was certified platinum. The album was particularly successful in Brazil, where the songs "4 Minutes", "Give It 2 Me", "Heartbeat", "Beat Goes On" and "Candy Shop" were all certified platinum, for sales of 60,000 copies of the songs as digital downloads.

Hard Candy also debuted at number one on the UK Albums Chart, making Madonna one of the few artists to achieve ten number one albums, behind Elvis Presley, with eleven, and the Beatles, with fifteen. The album was certified platinum by the British Phonographic Industry for shipments of over 300,000 copies in the United Kingdom. According to the Official Charts Company, Hard Candy has sold 335,523 copies in the UK, as of September 2009. It also reached the top of the European Top 100 Albums chart. In Germany, the album debuted at the top of the Media Control Charts and was present for forty weeks. In Ireland, the album debuted at the top of the Irish charts, replacing 25 Years – 25 Songs by Mary Black. Hard Candy also topped the albums chart in France. It sold 37,963 units in its first two-days and was certified platinum by the Syndicat National de l'Édition Phonographique (SNEP) for shipment of 200,000 copies. Hard Candy was also the best-selling international album of 2008 in Italy according to Musica e dischi with over 170,000 units sold.

== Accolades and recognition ==
"Much ink and cyber space have been devoted to debating the relevancy of Madonna, and in 2008, with the pop star approaching her 50th birthday, her relevancy and place in the ever-changing pop culture landscape was up for debate once again. But, as she's known to do, [she] proved her critics wrong with Hard Candy debuting at number one on the Billboard album charts not only in the United States and Canada, but in 20 other countries as well."

— Michele Yeo from Entertainment Tonight Canada commenting on the album.

Hard Candy received several accolades and year-end mentions following its release. Spanish outlet Jenesaispop and news agency EFE included it among the best albums of 2008. In Denmark, Ole Burn Rosenstand of Gaffa magazine ranked it as one of the year's top 10 foreign albums. It was awarded English-Language Album of the Year at the seventh edition of Mexico's Premios Oye! The album was also honored as one of the Top 3 International Albums at the 2009 Japan Gold Disc Awards. Additionally, Hard Candy received a nomination for Foreign Modern Pop-Rock Album of the Year at the 2009 Hungarian Music Awards.

On the album's 10th anniversary, Billboard's Chuck Arnold described Hard Candy as Madonna's "last great album", even if it's not a "classic" or up to par to her previous works. He praised its consistency, writing: "There is no filler. There are no bad tracks. Zero." Arnold also noted that "the special Neptunes sauce" inspired Madonna to sound more erotic than she had since Erotica. He concluded by calling the album a "sweet victory lap" —a fitting final chapter in her 25-year tenure with Warner Bros., the label under which she became "the most famous female artist on the planet."

In Mobile Internet For Dummies, authors Michael J. O'Farrell, John R. Levine, Jostein Arlgroy, James Pearce, and Daniel Appelquist noted that Hard Candy made Madonna the first major artist to release an album via mobile phones prior to its physical store release —a point echoed by The Times' Jonathan Richards. Writing for Billboard, Leila Cobo highlighted Madonna as one of the artists "at the forefront of the mobile revolution" in Latin America, which was then the most active region globally in terms of preloaded content. Fellow Billboard writer Andre Paine reported that Sony Ericsson sold 650,000 units of its W760 model across Latin America, preloaded with Hard Candy, earning a symbolic gold disc from Warner Music. According to Chilean newspaper La Nación, the album's mobile release set a precedent for how cell phones emerged as a key platform for music distribution during the 2008 financial crisis.

== Track listing ==
Hard Candy track listing
No.	Title	Writer(s)	Producer(s)	Length
1.	"Candy Shop"	Pharrell Williams; Madonna	The Neptunes; Madonna^{[a]}	4:16
2.	"4 Minutes" (featuring Justin Timberlake and Timbaland)	Madonna; Tim Mosley; Justin Timberlake; Nate Hills	Timbaland; Timberlake; Danja	4:04
3.	"Give It 2 Me"	Williams; Madonna	The Neptunes; Madonna^{[a]}	4:48
4.	"Heartbeat"	Williams; Madonna	The Neptunes; Madonna^{[a]}	4:04
5.	"Miles Away"	Madonna; Mosley; Timberlake; Hills	Timbaland; Timberlake; Danja	4:49
6.	"She's Not Me"	Williams; Madonna	The Neptunes; Madonna^{[a]}	6:05
7.	"Incredible"	Williams; Madonna	The Neptunes; Madonna^{[a]}	6:20
8.	"Beat Goes On" (featuring Kanye West)	Williams; Madonna; West	The Neptunes; Madonna^{[a]}	4:27
9.	"Dance 2Night"	Madonna; Mosley; Timberlake; Hannon Lane	Timbaland; Timberlake; Lane^{[a]}; Demacio "Demo" Castellon^{[b]}	5:03
10.	"Spanish Lesson"	Williams; Madonna	The Neptunes; Madonna^{[a]}	3:38
11.	"Devil Wouldn't Recognize You"	Madonna; Mosley; Timberlake; Hills; Joe Henry	Timbaland; Timberlake; Danja	5:09
12.	"Voices"	Madonna; Mosley; Timberlake; Hills; Lane	Timbaland; Timberlake; Danja; Lane^{[a]}	3:39
Total length:				56:22

Japanese and iTunes Store pre-order bonus track
No.	Title	Writer(s)	Producer(s)	Length
13.	"Ring My Bell"	Williams; Madonna	The Neptunes; Madonna^{[a]}	3:54
Total length:				60:16

=== Notes ===
- ^{^[a]} signifies a co-producer
- ^{^[b]} signifies an additional producer
- Digital deluxe edition includes the Peter Saves New York Edit and Junkie XL Remix Edit of "4 Minutes" and the Paul Oakenfold Edit of "Give It 2 Me".
- Limited LP edition includes the Tracy Young Mixshow and Peter Saves New York remix of "4 Minutes".
- Limited Collector's Edition Candy Box includes the Tracy Young House Edit and Rebirth Remix Edit of "4 Minutes".

== Credits and personnel ==
Credits adapted from the album's liner notes.

- Madonna – vocals, songwriting, executive producer
- Justin Timberlake – vocals, background vocals, songwriting, executive producer
- Timbaland – vocals, songwriting, executive producer, drums, bass
- Kanye West – vocals (rap)
- Pharrell Williams – songwriting, background vocals, producer
- Nate "Danja" Hills – producer, keyboards
- Mark "Spike" Stent – audio recording, audio mixing
- Andrew Coleman – audio mixing
- Anthony Asher – engineering
- Marcella "Ms. Lago" Araica – recording
- Demacio "Demo" Castellon – recording, programming, audio mixing
- Julian Vasquez – assistant engineer
- Vadim Chislov – assistant engineer
- Graham Archer – assistant engineer
- Fareed Salamah – assistant engineer
- Joseph Castellon – senior engineer
- Wendy Melvoin – acoustic guitar
- Monte Pittman – acoustic and bass guitar
- Hannon Lane – keyboards
- DJ Demo – scratches
- Ron Taylor – Pro Tools
- Stevie Blacke – strings
- Chris Gehringer – audio mastering
- Steven Klein – principal photography
- Giovanni Blanco – art direction
- Guy Oseary – management

== Charts ==
=== Weekly charts ===
Weekly chart performance for Hard Candy
Chart (2008)	Peak position
Argentine Albums (CAPIF)	1
Australian Albums (ARIA)	1
Austrian Albums (Ö3 Austria)	1
Belgian Albums (Ultratop Flanders)	2
Belgian Albums (Ultratop Wallonia)	2
Brazilian Albums (Top Álbuns Brasil)	1
Canadian Albums (Billboard)	1
Chilean Albums (IFPI Chile)	1
Croatian International Albums (HDU)	1
Czech Albums (ČNS IFPI)	1
Danish Albums (Hitlisten)	1
Dutch Albums (Album Top 100)	1
European Top 100 Albums (Billboard)	1
Finnish Albums (Suomen virallinen lista)	1
French Albums (SNEP)	1
German Albums (Offizielle Top 100)	1
Greek Albums (IFPI)	1
Hungarian Albums (MAHASZ)	2
Icelandic Albums (Tónlistinn)	4
Irish Albums (IRMA)	1
Italian Albums (FIMI)	1
Japanese Albums (Oricon)	1
Mexican Albums (Top 100 Mexico)	3
New Zealand Albums (RMNZ)	5
Norwegian Albums (VG-lista)	2
Polish Albums (ZPAV)	1
Portuguese Albums (AFP)	1
Scottish Albums (Official Charts)	1
Slovenian Albums (IFPI)	1
Spanish Albums (Promusicae)	1
Swedish Albums (Sverigetopplistan)	1
Swiss Albums (Schweizer Hitparade)	1
UK Albums (Official Charts)	1
US Billboard 200	1

=== Monthly charts ===
Monthly chart performance for Hard Candy
Chart (2008)	Peak position
Argentine Albums (CAPIF)	3
Japanese International Albums (Oricon)	1
South Korean Albums (RIAK)	4
Uruguayan Albums (CUDISCO)	5

=== Year-end charts ===
Year-end chart performance for Hard Candy
Chart (2008)	Position
Australian Albums (ARIA)	47
Austrian Albums (Ö3 Austria)	20
Belgian Albums (Ultratop Flanders)	22
Belgian Albums (Ultratop Wallonia)	25
Canadian Albums (Billboard)	9
Croatian Combined Albums (HDU)	14
Danish Albums (Hitlisten)	16
Dutch Albums (Album Top 100)	10
European Top 100 Albums (Billboard)	7
Finnish Foreign Albums (Suomen virallinen lista)	6
French Albums (SNEP)	23
German Albums (Offizielle Top 100)	14
Greek Albums (IFPI)	12
Hungarian Albums (MAHASZ)	5
Italian Albums (FIMI)	7
Japan Hot Albums (Billboard Japan)	60
Japanese Albums (Oricon)	42
Mexican Albums (Top 100 Mexico)	6
Norwegian Albums (VG-lista)	7
Spanish Albums (PROMUSICAE)	30
Swedish Albums (Sverigetopplistan)	14
Swiss Albums (Schweizer Hitparade)	8
UK Albums (OCC)	36
US Billboard 200	53
Worldwide Albums (IFPI)	11

== Certifications and sales ==
Certifications and sales for Hard Candy
Region	Certification	Certified units/sales
Argentina (CAPIF)	Platinum	40,000^{^}
Australia (ARIA)	Platinum	70,000^{^}
Austria (IFPI Austria)	Platinum	20,000^{*}
Belgium (BRMA)	Platinum	30,000^{*}
Brazil	—	50,000
Canada (Music Canada)	Platinum	169,000
Chile (IFPI Chile)	Gold	7,500
Czech Republic (ČNS IFPI)	2× Platinum	
Denmark (IFPI Danmark)	Platinum	30,000^{^}
Finland (Musiikkituottajat)	Platinum	22,011
France (SNEP)	Platinum	240,000
Germany (BVMI)	Platinum	200,000^{^}
Greece (IFPI Greece)	Platinum	15,000^{^}
Hungary (MAHASZ)	Gold	3,000^{^}
Ireland (IRMA)	Platinum	15,000^{^}
Italy	—	175,774
Japan (RIAJ)	Platinum	252,520
Mexico (AMPROFON)	Platinum	80,000^{^}
Netherlands (NVPI)	Platinum	60,000^{^}
Poland (ZPAV)	Platinum	20,000^{*}
Portugal (AFP)	Gold	10,000^{^}
Russia (NFPF)	4× Platinum	80,000^{*}
Slovakia (IFPI Slovakia)	3× Platinum	6,000
South Korea	—	4,525 (Note: South Korean sales as of June 2008 according to the Music Industry Association of Korea (MIAK).)
Spain (Promusicae)	Gold	43,500
Sweden (GLF)	Gold	40,000
Switzerland (IFPI Switzerland)	Platinum	30,000^{^}
Taiwan	—	25,000
Turkey (Mü-Yap)	Gold	5,000^{*}
United Kingdom (BPI)	Platinum	335,523
United States (RIAA)	Gold	751,000
Summaries
Europe (IFPI)	Platinum	1,000,000^{*}
Worldwide	—	4,000,000
^{*} Sales figures based on certification alone.^{^} Shipments figures based on certification alone.

== Release history ==
Release dates and formats for Hard Candy
Region	Date	Format(s)	Edition	Label	Ref.
Mexico	April 18, 2008	CD; digital download	Standard	Warner	
European Union	April 25, 2008	CD; digital download	Standard	Warner	
United Kingdom	April 29, 2008	CD; digital download	Standard	Warner	
United States	April 29, 2008	CD; digital download	Standard	Warner	
United States	April 29, 2008	CD; digital download	Special	Warner	
United Kingdom	May 12, 2008	CD; digital download	Special	Warner	
United Kingdom	May 19, 2008	3-LP; box set	Special	Maverick	
United States	June 10, 2008	3-LP; box set	Special	Warner	
