= Give It 2 Me =

2008 single by Madonna

Single by Madonna

from the album Hard Candy
- Released: June 24, 2008
- Recorded: 2007
- Studio: Record Plant (Los Angeles); Sarm West (London); Criteria (Miami)
- Genre: Dance-pop
- Length: 4:48
- Label: Warner Bros.
- Songwriters: Madonna; Pharrell Williams
- Producers: The Neptunes; Madonna

Madonna singles chronology
"4 Minutes" (2008)	"Give It 2 Me" (2008)	"Miles Away" (2008)

Music video
- "Give It 2 Me" on YouTube

"Give It 2 Me" is a song recorded by American singer Madonna from her eleventh studio album, Hard Candy (2008). It was written by Madonna and Pharrell Williams, and produced by Madonna and recording duo The Neptunes, made up of Williams and Chad Hugo. Noted a manifesto dance-pop song with trance, hip-hop, EDM, Eurodance, and industrial elements, its lyrics are ambiguous. They appear to be about sex and dancing, but are actually about success, survival, and focusing on the present. "Give It 2 Me" and its remixes were made available for digital download on June 24. In Australia and most European countries, it was released on July 11.

Upon release "Give It 2 Me" received positive reviews from contemporary critics. They compared it to Madonna's past work and deemed it one of the best tracks from the album. A moderate commercial success, in the United States, the song debuted and peaked on the Billboard Hot 100 at number 57. Nonetheless, it became Madonna's 39th number-one on Billboard's Hot Dance Club Play chart. It was successful in Europe, topping the charts in Spain, The Netherlands and Hungary, while charting within the top ten in other markets, including the United Kingdom.

A music video was directed by Tom Munro and Nathan Rissman. Shot in black and white, it shows Madonna wearing multiple clothing provided by Chanel and Roberto Cavalli. Williams also makes an appearance. Some critics pointed out that the video echoed past looks of the singer. Madonna sang "Give It 2 Me" on the promotional concerts offered for Hard Candy, on her set at the BBC Radio 1's Big Weekend, and on 2008―2009's Sticky & Sweet Tour.

== Background and composition ==
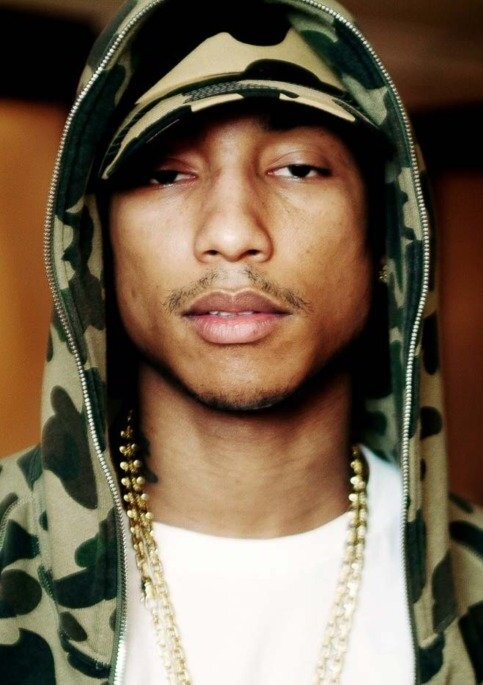
Pharrell Williams co-produced and co-wrote "Give it 2 Me" alongside Madonna.

In October 2007, Madonna announced her departure from Warner Bros. Records, and signed a $120 million, ten-year 360 deal with American multinational entertainment company Live Nation; the deal would encompass her future music-related businesses, including touring, merchandising and associated sponsorship agreements, among other things. For Hard Candy, her eleventh studio album and her final with Warner Bros., she chose to "work her magic" on the sound of urban contemporary music, and collaborated with American singer Justin Timberlake, rapper Timbaland, record production duo The Neptunes ―Pharrell Williams and Chad Hugo― as well as Nate "Danja" Hills.

Recording sessions for Hard Candy took place at Los Angeles' Record Plant studios, Miami's Criteria Studios, and London's Sarm West Studios. "Give It 2 Me" was written by Madonna and Williams, and was produced by the singer and The Neptunes. She envisioned the song as a party anthem that she could perform in a stadium full of jumping fans. By the time it was recorded, most of Hard Candy was already completed. Furthermore, Madonna revealed that Give It 2 Me was one of the titles she had initially considered for the album, but changed her mind as there was already a song by Timbaland with that name.

Musically, "Give It 2 Me" has been noted a dance pop song with elements of trance, hip-hop, EDM, Eurodance, and industrial. (Note: Per multiple sources) A manifesto song, its lyrics are ambiguous; they appear to be about sex and dancing, but are actually about success, survival, "focusing on the here and now [and] not looking back and moving forward". Madonna herself described the song as autobiographical: "It's the provocative me. The boring, predictable me [...] 'give me all you got', it's quite a sort of tough stance". According to the sheet music published by Alfred Publishing Inc., "Give It 2 Me" is set in the time signature of common time, with a medium dance tempo of 132 beats per minute. The track's composed in the key of G♯ minor, with Madonna's vocal range spanning from G_{3} to C_{5}, and has a basic sequence of D♯m–G♯m–E–F♯–A♯m–D♯m as its chord progression.

'Give It 2 Me'
Audio sample of "Give It 2 Me", featuring the chorus, backed by a synthesized musical arrangement and cowbells.

Caryn Ganz from Rolling Stone magazine, explained that "Give It 2 Me" incorporates a "thick" synthesizer, similar to the one Danja used on Britney Spears’ fifth studio album, Blackout (2007). Among "insidious" beats, Madonna sings, When the lights go down and there's no one left, I can go on and on and on. Then, when the song builds into a "blistering" crescendo, she sings the lines, If it's against the law, arrest me, if you can handle it, undress me. There's a West African-inspired percussion on the bridge, which has Madonna singing Get stupid, don't stop it over a xylophone. The song ends as the beat "builds into a frenzy" and Madonna proclaims, Give it to me, No one's gonna stop me now. Present throughout the track are snare drums, "LCD Soundsystem-style" cowbells, and synthesizers characteristic to the work of The Killers.

== Release and critical reception ==
On April 21, 2008, one week before Hard Candy's release in the United States, "Give It 2 Me" and other songs from the album leaked online. It was sent to American radios on June 24. That same day official remixes were made available for digital download. In Australia and most European countries, the CD and maxi singles were released on July 11. (Note: See sources cited on "Weekly charts" section) Upon release, critical reviews towards "Give It 2 Me" were generally positive. Instinct magazine and Gay Times named it one of the album's best tracks. Chris Willman from Entertainment Weekly said it sounded as if Madonna's 1983 singles "Holiday" and "Lucky Star" had been "filter[ed] through hip-hop's sonic boom", concluding that it was Hard Candy's "most exciting banger". Michael Roffman from online magazine Consequence also felt it echoed Madonna's past work, but, "there are ties to its modernity that prevent it from being too nostalgic". Miles Marshall Lewis from The Village Voice perceived "effects straight outta 'Material Girl' and sonic allusions to Nile Rodgers" on "Give It 2 Me". The single was compared to Rick James' "Super Freak" (1981) by both Jon Pareles from The New York Times, and Alexis Petridis from The Guardian.

"A half-decade before 'Blurred Lines', The Neptunes granted Madonna a very similar bass-and-cowbell shuffle for her finest Hard Candy single. [...] [I]t sounds impossibly winning, like a flashback to an alternate-universe version of Madonna’s early career where she got together with Arthur Russell and made a bunch of classic weirdo club-slayers for the NY underground".

— Andrew Unterberger reviewing "Give It 2 Me" on Billboard's ranking of Madonna songs.

The staff of NME, BBC's Mark Savage, Pitchfork's Tom Ewing, and Chris Gerard from WRC-TV all singled out "Give It 2 Me", even though they gave Hard Candy negative reviews. Savage felt the track had a "cute, bouncy beat and sense of humour that has been missing from Madonna's music since her Dick Tracy days", while Gerard compared it to something Kylie Minogue would release. Also from the BBC, Tom Young described the single as a "wholesome sugar rush". While author Daryl Easlea deemed it "irresistibly anthemic", Parade's Samuel R. Murrian concluded that, "if you ever need an extra boost of energy near the end of a strenuous workout, ['Give It 2 Me'] works like a charm". Rolling Stone's Caryn Ganz referred to "Give It 2 Me" as a "thumpy self-empowerment anthem", in which "the creative tension between Madonna and the Neptunes' Pharrell crackles". Talia Soghomonian from MusicOMH deemed it, "refreshing, heavily synthesized but also misleading. [It] makes you believe that the rest of [the album] will be as fun".

For Junkee's Joseph Earp, "Give It 2 Me" comes across as "rather tame" in comparison to other album tracks. Jude Rogers from The Guardian deemed it "half annoying, half brilliant". From Evening Standard, El Hunt wrote: "Madonna often winds up feeling like a guest dropping by on her own record; ['Give It 2 Me'] could just as easily be an N.E.R.D. track". Williams' appearance on the song's bridge received some criticism. Chuck Arnold, writing for Entertainment Weekly, opined that, "a bit of silly goofiness during that 'get stupid' bridge with Pharrell can't deny ['Give It 2 Me''s] insistent bounce". By his part, Slant Magazine's Sal Cinquemani dismissed it as, "just plain stupid". Thomas Hausner from PopMatters was not pleased with Williams' input, concluding that it, "completely disrupt[s] the song's full potential". "Give It 2 Me" has been referred to as one of Madonna's best songs by Billboard, Entertainment Weekly, and Parade. Additionally, it was nominated for Best Dance Recording at the 51st Grammy Awards.

== Commercial performance ==
"Give It 2 Me" debuted and peaked on the US Billboard Hot 100 at number 57 the week of May 17, 2008. The following month, it entered the Hot Dance Airplay chart at number 11, eventually reaching the first spot on its third week. "Give It 2 Me" also topped Billboard's Hot Dance Club Play chart, where it became Madonna's 39th number-one. In April 2010, Billboard reported that the song had sold 316, 000 digital units, making it one of Madonna's best-selling singles since 2005. "Give It 2 Me" debuted and peaked on the eight position of the Canadian Hot 100 on May 17, 2008, remaining on the chart for 20 weeks. It additionally reached the top three in Mexico, Costa Rica, Chile, and El Salvador.

On May 4, 2008, "Give It 2 Me" entered the UK Singles Chart at number 25, ultimately peaking at number seven. It was present on the chart for a total of 19 weeks. On the year-end singles chart, the song came in at number 73. As of 2015, "Give It 2 Me" is Madonna's 37th best-selling single in the UK. 12 Years after its release, the single was certified Silver by the British Phonographic Industry for the shipment of 200, 000 copies. It was slightly less successful in Australia, where it entered and peaked at number 23 before falling off the chart.

The single was successful across Europe. In Spain, it debuted at number one on Spanish Singles Chart and spent four weeks atop. It also topped the charts in The Netherlands and Hungary, while in other countries like France and Denmark, it reached the first five spots. In Denmark, "Give It 2 Me" was certified gold by for shipment of 7,500 copies. The song was slightly less successful in Austria, Germany and Ireland, where it cracked within the top ten. "Give It 2 Me" came in at number two on the European Hot 100 Singles, behind Kid Rock's "All Summer Long".

== Music video ==
The music video for "Give It 2 Me" was directed by Tom Munro and Nathan Rissman, and was made available for streaming on June 4, 2008. In Brazil, it leaked two months before its premiere date. Filmed in black-and-white during a photoshoot for Elle magazine, the singer wears clothes provided by labels like Chanel and Roberto Cavalli; these include a chiffon blouse, cowboy hat, boots and panties. Williams also appears on the video, wearing "enough jewelry to give Mr. T an inferiority complex".

The staff of MTV Buzzworthy noted that the visual referred past Madonna looks. The black-and-white "mood/burlesque feel" echoed the video for "Vogue" (1990), while the cowboy hat nodded to the singer's Music (2000) era. Finally, a "hipster workout gear" recalled 2006's Confessions Tour. By his part, Eric Wilson from The New York Times pointed out that the videos for "Give It 2 Me" and its predecessor "4 Minutes", didn't yield a "breakout Madonna look, nothing like her instant personas of the '80s or '90s". "Give It 2 Me" was considered Madonna's 39th greastest music video by Louis Virtel from The Backlot, and is one of her most underrated according to VH1's Christopher Rossa, who deemed it, "gorgeous AF [...] glossy and dizzying, chock-full of sexy moves and camera tricky". It can be found on Madonna's 2009 compilation Celebration: The Video Collection.

== Live performances ==
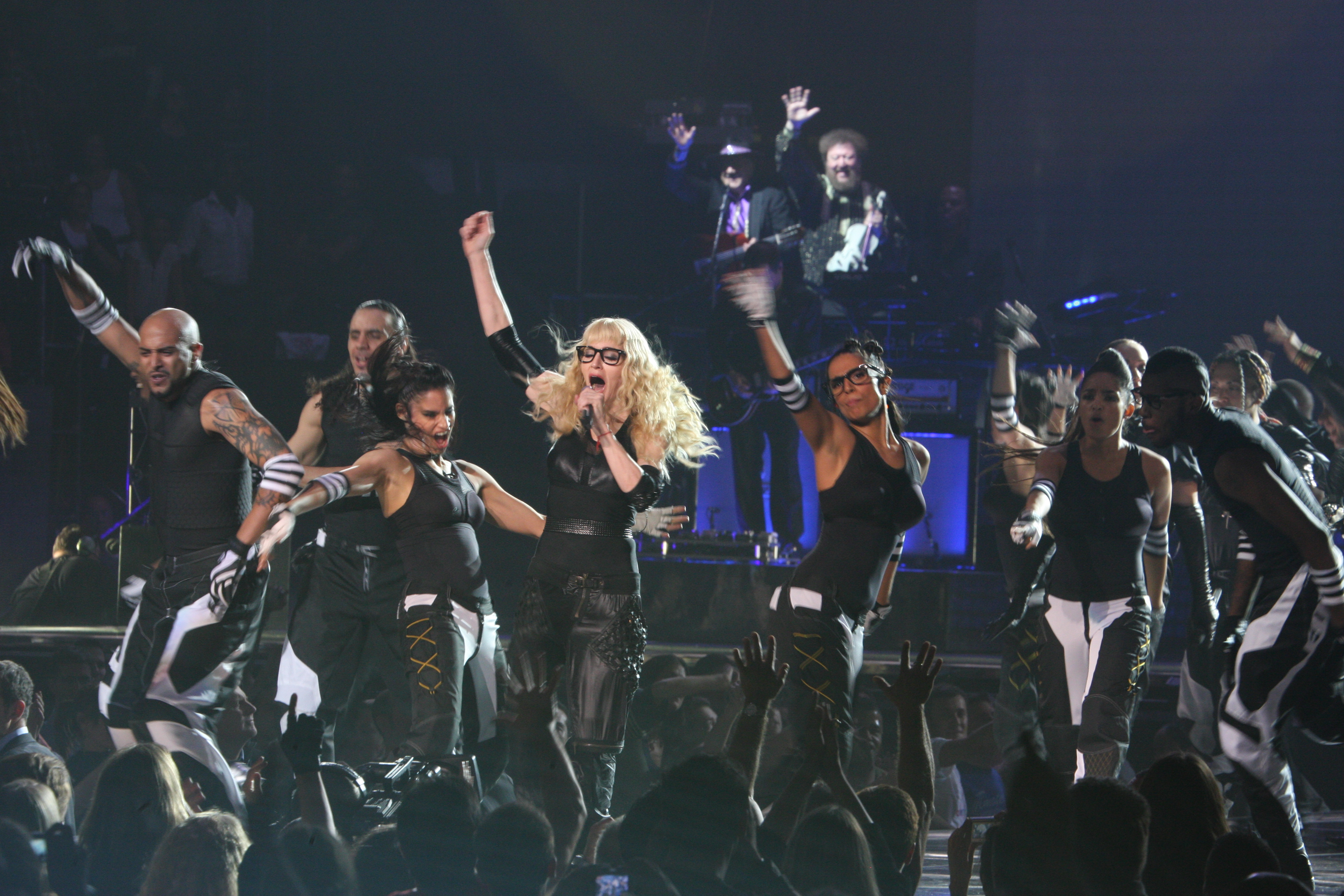
Madonna and her dancers perform "Give It 2 Me" as the final number of 2008―2009's Sticky & Sweet Tour

Madonna sang "Give It 2 Me" on the promotional concerts offered for Hard Candy, which took place at New York's Roseland Ballroom, on April 30, 2008, and at Paris' Olympia hall on May 6. She wore a sleeveless zip-up top that had the word "Hard" in silver letters on the front and "Candy" on the back, and sang surrounded by two male dancers in durags who, "encouraged the crowd to hop up on the track's synth-amped chorus", as noted by Caryn Ganz. Williams appeared on the backdrop screens, as green lasers flashed across the stage. On May 10, Madonna sang the track on the BBC Radio 1's Big Weekend.

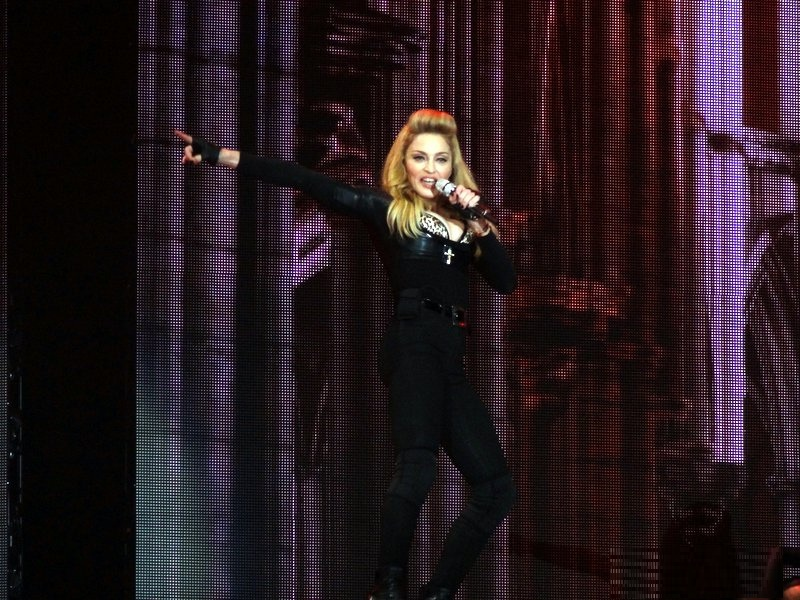
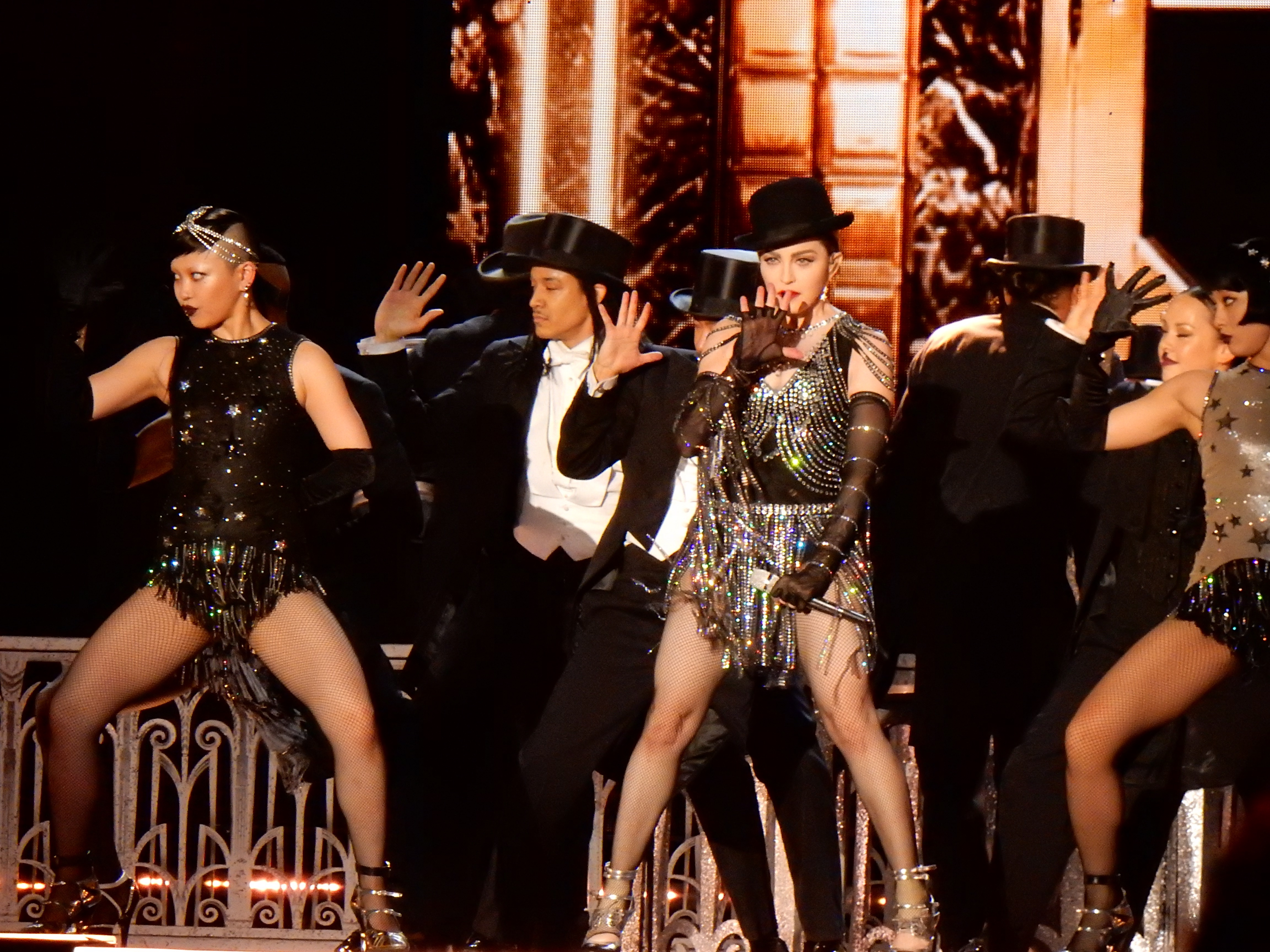
Musical elements of "Give It 2 Me" were incorporated to the performances of "Girl Gone Wild" (left) and "Music" (right) on the MDNA (2012) and Rebel Heart (2015―2016) tours.

A remixed "Give It 2 Me" was the final song of the Sticky & Sweet Tour (2008―2009). The Houston Chronicle's Joey Guerra described the number as an, "all-out Madonna freak-out. [She] stomped across the stage, dancers at her side, in a pair of black-framed glasses". The backdrops depicted imagery of the 1980s video games Space Invaders and Asteroids. Then, when the song abruptly ended, the words "Game Over" flashed onscreen. In one of the concerts offered at New York's Madison Square Garden, Wiliams himself joined Madonna during the number. A performance of the track was included on the Sticky & Sweet Tour live album release (2010), recorded in Buenos Aires.

In 2012, musical elements of "Give It 2 Me" were incorporated into the MDNA Tour's performance of "Girl Gone Wild". On one of that tour's New York concerts, on November 13, South Korean entertainer Psy joined Madonna onstage for a mashup performance of "Give It 2 Me" and his own "Gangnam Style". From the Los Angeles Times, Todd Martens pointed out that, "[Madonna and Psy] seemed at a loss for how to interact outside the lighthearted confines of his 'Gangnam Style'". The performance of "Music" (2000) on 2015―2016's Rebel Heart Tour featured elements of "Give It 2 Me".

== Track listings and formats ==
- UK / EU CD1
1. "Give It 2 Me" (Album Version) – 4:47
2. "Give It 2 Me" (Oakenfold Extended Mix) – 7:08
- U.S. / EU maxi-single
1. "Give It 2 Me" (Fedde le Grand Remix) – 6:40
2. "Give It 2 Me" (Oakenfold Extended Remix) – 6:59
3. "Give It 2 Me" (Oakenfold Drums In Mix) – 5:44
4. "Give It 2 Me" (Eddie Amador Club) – 11:05
5. "Give It 2 Me" (Eddie Amador House Lovers Remix) – 7:52
6. "Give It 2 Me" (Tong & Spoon Wonderland Mix) – 7:35
7. "Give It 2 Me" (Jody den Broeder Club) – 9:33
8. "Give It 2 Me" (Sly and Robbie Bongo Mix) – 4:54
- U.S. 2× 12" vinyl set

Disc 1

1. "Give It 2 Me" (Album Version) – 4:47
2. "Give It 2 Me" (Eddie Amador House Lovers Mix) – 7:52

Disc 2

1. "Give It 2 Me" (Oakenfold Extended Remix) – 6:59
2. "Give It 2 Me" (Jody den Broeder Club) – 9:33
- Digital single (Remixes)
1. "Give It 2 Me" (LP Version) 4:47
2. "Give It 2 Me" (House Lovers Edit) 4:50
3. "Give It 2 Me" (Paul Oakenfold Drums In Mix) 5:44
4. "Give It 2 Me" (Eddie Amador Club) 9:51
5. "Give It 2 Me" (Eddie Amador Dub) 9:59
6. "Give It 2 Me" (Fedde Le Grand Dub) 6:41
7. "Give It 2 Me" (Fedde Le Grand Remix) 6:41
8. "Give It 2 Me" (Jody den Broeder Club) 9:27
9. "Give It 2 Me" (Jody den Broeder Dub) 9:57
10. "Give It 2 Me" (Paul Oakenfold Dub) 6:14
11. "Give It 2 Me" (Paul Oakenfold Extended Mix) 6:59
12. "Give It 2 Me" (Sly & Robbie Bongo Mix) 4:54
13. "Give It 2 Me" (Sly & Robbie Ragga Mix) 4:55
14. "Give It 2 Me" (Tong & Spoon Get Stupid Dub) 7:34
15. "Give It 2 Me" (Tong & Spoon Wonderland Mix) 7:34
16. "Give It 2 Me" (Tong & Spoon Wonderland Radio Edit) 4:28

== Credits and personnel ==
Credits adapted from the Hard Candy liner notes.

- Madonna – writer, co-producer, vocals
- Pharrell Williams – writer, additional vocals
- The Neptunes – producer
- Mark "Spike" Stent – audio mixing
- Andrew Coleman – mixing consoles

== Charts ==
=== Weekly charts ===
Weekly chart performance for "Give It 2 Me"
Chart (2008)	Peak position
Australia (ARIA)	23
Austria (Ö3 Austria Top 40)	10
Belgium (Ultratop 50 Flanders)	3
Belgium (Ultratop 50 Wallonia)	3
Canada Hot 100 (Billboard)	8
Canada CHR/Top 40 (Billboard)	27
Canada Hot AC (Billboard)	22
CIS Airplay (TopHit)	3
Chile (Monitor Latino)	2
Costa Rica (Monitor Latino)	3
Croatia International Airplay (HRT)	1
Czech Republic Airplay (ČNS IFPI)	4
Denmark (Tracklisten)	4
Euro Digital Songs (Billboard)	7
Europe (European Hot 100 Singles)	2
El Salvador (Monitor Latino)	1
Finland (Suomen virallinen lista)	2
France (SNEP)	5
Germany (GfK)	8
Global Dance Songs (Billboard)	1
Greece Digital Songs (Billboard)	1
Hungary (Dance Top 40)	2
Hungary (Rádiós Top 40)	1
Hungary (Single Top 40)	2
Ireland (IRMA)	10
Italy (FIMI)	3
Netherlands (Dutch Top 40)	1
Netherlands (Single Top 100)	3
Norway (VG-lista)	6
Mexico Anglo (Monitor Latino)	3
Portugal Digital Songs (Billboard)	2
Russia Airplay (TopHit)	2
Scottish Singles Sales (Official Charts)	4
Slovakia Airplay (ČNS IFPI)	7
Spain (Promusicae)	1
Sweden (Sverigetopplistan)	13
Switzerland (Schweizer Hitparade)	4
Turkey (Billboard)	1
UK Singles (Official Charts)	7
US Billboard Hot 100	57
US Dance Club Songs (Billboard)	1
US Dance Airplay (Billboard)	1
US Hot Dance Singles Sales (Billboard)	1
Venezuela Pop Rock (Record Report)	1

=== Year-end charts ===
2008 year-end chart performance for "Give It 2 Me"
Chart (2008)	Position
Austria (Ö3 Austria Top 40)	66
Belgium (Ultratop 50 Flanders)	24
Belgium (Ultratop 50 Wallonia)	49
Brazil (Crowley Broadcast Analysis)	49
Canada (Canadian Hot 100)	63
CIS (TopHit)	22
Croatia International Airplay (HRT)	9
Denmark (Tracklisten)	37
Europe (European Hot 100 Singles)	30
Finland (Suomen virallinen lista)	10
France (SNEP)	54
Germany (Media Control GfK)	57
Hungary (Dance Top 40)	16
Hungary (Rádiós Top 40)	8
Italy (FIMI)	5
Netherlands (Dutch Top 40)	15
Netherlands (Single Top 100)	26
Russia Airplay (TopHit)	34
Spain (PROMUSICAE)	4
Sweden (Sverigetopplistan)	60
Switzerland (Schweizer Hitparade)	35
UK Singles (OCC)	73
US Dance Club Play (Billboard)	32
US Hot Dance Airplay (Billboard)	12
Venezuela Anglo (Record Report)	1

2009 year-end chart performance for "Give It 2 Me"
Chart (2009)	Position
Hungary (Dance Top 40)	144

=== Decade-end charts ===
Decade-end chart performance for "Give It 2 Me"
Chart (2000–2009)	Position
CIS Airplay (TopHit)	92
Russia Airplay (TopHit)	122

== Certifications and sales ==
Certifications and sales for "Give It 2 Me"
Region	Certification	Certified units/sales
Brazil (Pro-Música Brasil)	Platinum	60,000^{*}
Denmark (IFPI Danmark)	Platinum	15,000^{^}
Finland	—	3,434
France	—	49,390
Italy	—	78,863
Spain (Promusicae)	Gold	10,000^{*}
Spain (Promusicae) Ringtone	Gold	10,000^{*}
United Kingdom (BPI)	Silver	200,000^{‡}
United States	—	316,000
^{*} Sales figures based on certification alone.^{^} Shipments figures based on certification alone.^{‡} Sales+streaming figures based on certification alone.

== Release history ==
Release dates and formats for "Give It 2 Me"
Region	Date	Format(s)	Label(s)	Ref.
United States	June 24, 2008	Contemporary hit radio	Warner Bros.	
United Kingdom	July 14, 2008	CD; maxi CD	Warner Bros.	
France	July 15, 2008	CD	Warner Music	
Argentina	July 16, 2008	Maxi CD	Warner Music	
United States	August 5, 2008	Maxi CD	Warner Bros.	
Germany	August 8, 2008	Maxi CD	Warner Music	
United States	August 19, 2008	12-inch vinyl	Warner Bros.	
United States	August 26, 2008	Double 12-inch vinyl	Warner Bros.	
Various	August 11, 2009	Digital download (EP)	Warner Bros.	

== See also ==
- List of Dutch Top 40 number-one singles of 2008
- List of number-one dance singles of 2008 (U.S.)
- List of number-one dance airplay hits of 2008 (U.S.)
- List of Spanish number-one hits of 2008
