= Make a Wish (2011 film) =

- Directed by: Romana Carén
- Written by: Pascoe Foxell; Romana Carén
- Produced by: Bruno Santos, Henrietta McCormick
- Starring: Jean-Philippe Heon; Lia McQuiston
- Cinematography: Alan Besedin
- Edited by: Pascoe Foxell
- Music by: Geoffrey Dawes
- Release date: May 2011 (Cannes Film Festival)
- Running time: 6 minutes
- Country: United Kingdom
- Language: English

Make a Wish is a 2011 British short film directed by Romana Carén, about a trunk with the note "Make a wish" on it. It was screened in the Short Film Corner of the Cannes Film Festival 2011.

== Plot ==
Make a Wish is a dramatic comedy with dark undertones. It's a simple cautionary tale which is symbolic for how thoughts can influence our lives and our responsibility for our deeds. John, the protagonist receives a trunk that has the power to fulfill all of his dreams. Gradually he becomes greedier and greedier. He gets what he wishes for, but he is made to pay the price. What seemed like an ideal world, soon turns into something rather unexpected.

== Cast ==
- Jean-Philippe Heon - John
- Lia McQuiston - Melanie
