= In a Heartbeat =

In a Heartbeat may refer to:

- In a Heartbeat (TV series), a Canadian-American television series
- In a Heartbeat (album), a 2005 album by Whit Dickey
- "In a Heartbeat", a song by Ringo Starr from Time Takes Time, 1992
- "In a Heartbeat" (Sandra song), 2009
- "In a Heartbeat" (Sylvia Ratonel song), 2011
- "In a Heartbeat", a song by Brandon Flowers from Thrasher, 2026
- In a Heartbeat (film), a 2017 animated short film by Beth David and Esteban Bravo
