= Change (Japanese TV series) =

- Genre: drama, politics
- Starring: Takuya Kimura; Eri Fukatsu
- Ending theme: Miles Away (Madonna)
- Country of origin: Japan
- Original language: Japanese
- No. of episodes: 10

Production
- Producers: Hiroyuki Goto, Kazuyuki Shimizu
- Production location: Tokyo
- Running time: 54 min./episode

Original release
- Network: Fuji TV
- Release: May 12 – July 14, 2008

CHANGE is a Japanese television drama which aired on Fuji TV starting May 12, 2008.

== Plot ==
Keita Asakura, an elementary school teacher who has no interest in politics, suddenly gets taken to the position of the Prime Minister. He is forced to campaign in the Fukuoka Prefecture for a seat in the House of Representatives for the Seiyu Party when his father and brother, both involved in Diet politics, die in a plane crash en route from Vietnam. Asakura wins the prefectural elections, and heads to Tokyo to take his father's place in the House.

After being sworn in, Asakura is dubbed the "Prince of the Parliament" (kokukai ouji) by the news media. The current Prime Minister is embroiled in a sexual harassment scandal and resigns, leading Kanbayashi, one of the most senior politicians in the Seiyu Party, to propose that Asakura run for the party's leadership. This puts Asakara in the running for the premiership should the Seiyu Party win a majority in an upcoming general election. Nirasawa and Hikaru arrives in Tokyo from Fukuoka and stays over at his residence, in time becoming his trusted aides.

One night, Asakura escapes from the Prime Minister's residence at night and goes to his parents' house, conducting research on the Yakushima affair with the help of Nirasawa and Hikaru. He promises Miyama that he will not neglect his official duties. Onoda, a senior Seiyu politician involved in the Yakushima affair, is asked by Kanbayashi to dissuade Asakura's crusade against the dam. However, Onoda comes to respect Asakura and ultimately helps him. Asakura apologises to the public at a press conference and vows to compensate all those affected by the dam.

== Cast ==
- Takuya Kimura as Keita Asakura
- Eri Fukatsu as Rika Miyama
- Hiroshi Abe as Katsutoshi Nirasawa
- Akira Terao as Masaichi Kanbayashi
- Rosa Kato as Hikaru Miyamoto

== Reception ==
CHANGE began okay with a 23.8% rating on its first episode. As the week progressed, the rating dropped to below 20%, which is unusual for a Japanese television drama. It hit 31.2% at 22:15 during the 60-minute extended finale episode.

The single episode ratings are as follows:

Episode	Title	Kanto
01	Elementary Teacher Changes Japan?! An Amateur in Politics Becomes the Youngest Prime Minister of Japan!! (小学校教師が日本を変える！？政治の素人が最年少総理大臣に!！)	23.8%
02	Prince of the Diet's First Experience (国会王子の初体験)	23.0%
03	Tonight, the Prime Minister of Japan's Debut!! (今夜、総理誕生！！)	22.4%
04	The Prime Minister Is Bullied (いじめられる総理)	19.3%
05	Big Incident on the Prime Minister's Day Off (総理休日の大事件)	19.5%
06	Love Scandal (恋愛スキャンダル)	19.1%
07	The Prime Minister Disappears (消えた総理)	20.9%
08	Separation. And Counterattack (別れ。そして逆襲)	19.5%
09	Shock!! The Prime Minister's Collapse (衝撃！！ 総理倒れる)	22.3%
10	Goodbye, The Prime Minister's Tearful Last Message (さようなら、朝倉総理涙のラストメッセージ)	27.4%
Average		21.7%

== Special campaign ==
Takuya Kimura is currently appearing in Toyota's commercial. Collaborating with Toyota, there will be a quiz after every episode, and the "Change" original car "STAR Fielder" made by Toyota (model based on Corolla Fielder) will be given to one of the viewers. From May 12, 2008, Takuya will continue appearing in Toyota's commercial but as Keita Asakura, this drama's character. On 10 and 12 May, two specials will be broadcast prior to the premiere, and Takuya and Eri Fukatsu will appear live on Mezamashi Terebi, Toku Dane!, and Waratte Iitomo (only Takuya), promoting the drama.

== International broadcast ==
Country	Network(s)/Station(s)	Series premiere	Title
Thailand	TPBS	April 2009, Repeat telecast in 2011	นายกมือใหม่ หัวใจประชาชน (nāyk mụ̄x h̄ım̀ h̄ạwcı prachāchn; literally Freshman Prime Minister)
