= The Heartbeat (album) =

Studio album by Bellarive
- Released: June 19, 2012
- Genre: Contemporary Christian music, worship, Christian rock
- Length: 62:56
- Label: Sparrow
- Producer: Bellarive, Joshua Silverberg

Bellarive chronology
The Heartbeat (2012)	Before There Was (2014)

The Heartbeat is the first studio album by Bellarive, and the album released on June 19, 2012 by Sparrow Records. The album was produced by Bellarive and Joshua Silverberg. The album debut at No. 21 and No. 17 on the Christian and Heatseekers albums charts, respectively. The lead single from the album is "Taste of Eternity". "Love Has Found Us", "Sing", "Shine On" and "Stories" were previously included on the band's debut EP, The Being Human Project...Start Listening.

== Singles ==
"Taste of Eternity" was released on April 24, 2012 as the first single from the album. It was written by Bellarive and Jason Ingram. It didn't chart, although the music video has over 70,000 views on YouTube, and received highly positive reviews.

=== Promotional singles ===
"Love Has Found Us" was released on February 1, 2010 as a promotional single. The song has received mainly positive reviews from critics and audiences.

"Sing" was released on April 11, 2011 as a promotional single. It, along with "Love Has Found Us", was included on The Being Human Project...Start Listening. It has so far received general acclaim.

== Reception ==
Professional ratings
Review scores
Source	Rating
CCM Magazine	3/5 stars
Christian Manifesto	4.5/5 stars
Christian Music Zine	4.5/5 stars
Christianity Today	2/5 stars
Cross Rhythms	9/10
Indie Vision Music	4/5 stars
Jesus Freak Hideout	4/5 stars
Louder Than The Music	4/5 stars
New Release Tuesday	4.5/5 stars
Worship Leader	4.5/5 stars

The Heartbeat has received generally favorable reviews from critics.

Alpha Omega News' Jason Rouse graded the album a B, and said "they use a wide variety of instruments to help them accomplish this goal. The part I like about this CD is that you can tell this group is wholehearted about making music to worship Jesus. I think I would like this group even more if they were to pick up their tempo a bit."

CCM Magazine's Grace S. Aspinwall said the band "produced a thoughtful, beautiful project in The Heartbeat."

The Christian Manifesto's Lydia Akinola said "The Heartbeat is offbeat, atypical and wacky worship album; an anomaly in a world of the stock, straight-forward, standard praise anthem. Although I can’t honestly say that I loved every second, I loved that every second was completely unexpected." In addition, Akinola wrote "The Heartbeat is definitely the most ‘indie’ label release I’ve heard all year. It’s one of the most adventurous listens too, an uncommon distinction for praise and worship affairs. It’s organic, visceral and engaging. The age-old debate between accessibility and art, convention and creativity, can be difficult for veterans to navigate, yet Bellarive took the challenge on. As T.S. Eliot once said ‘Only those who will risk going too far can possibly find out how far one can go.’ Who knows where Bellarive will wander next time?"

Christian Music Zine's Joshua Andre said "as an album though; musically and lyrically I have not heard this kind of experimentation and been this impressed by it, since David Crowder*Band’s ‘A Collision’. And for Bellarive to accomplish a lot within their debut album is just remarkable."

Christianity Today's Robert Ham said "There isn't necessarily anything lacking in the music of Bellarive. But there isn't much to separate the Orlando-based band from the rest of the modern worship world. Like their obvious secular influences Sigur Ros and U2, the group's music swells and recedes dramatically, building to big choruses or maintaining a bombastic intensity throughout. If this is where their heart is, musically and spiritually, we can't really fault them that point. But compared to so many similarly minded groups, Bellarive can't help but come off as a pale carbon copy."

Cross Rhythms' Elliot Rose said "Chief songwriter Sean Curran's lead vocals throughout the disc are inspiringly [sic] tender and passionate, particularly when harmonised [sic] with Melissa,...But overall this is a stimulating debut album from a truly innovative band."

Indie Vision Music's Jonathan Andre said "listening to each of the 12 ingeniously written melodies, I am certain that Bellarive (which means 'beautiful river') will receive many nominations for new artist of the year at the Doves; incorporating elements of both David Crowder and Rend Collective Experiment as the band infuses contemporary pop, acoustics, loud booming rock anthems and an overall passion that will make you want to jump out of your seat and worship Christ with all you’ve got." Andre wrote that the album is "full of richness, musically and lyrically; this is an album for those who want to continually engage with the Father and what He wants for us."

Jesus Freak Hideout's David Goodman said "it's hard to blend lyrical poetry and musical experimentation into worship music; it just is. Many who attempt as much tend to lean toward one extreme or the other - accessibility and simplicity, or musicianship and the avant-garde. Although I doubt any conscious attempt was made to ride that line, Bellarive steady themselves atop the intersection of progressive musical tone and expressive verse with poise. Their first full-length collection, The Heartbeat, ignores the line entirely, delivering a raucous collection of tunes that strike balance between sing-able worship and vibrant art." Additionally, Goodman wrote "The progressive nature of Bellarive's music has garnered comparisons to David Crowder*Band or Rend Collective, but honestly, they have a charm all their own. Emotive and melodious, enthusiastic and imaginative, The [Heartbeat] is a slow-burn masterpiece of musicianship rooted in a genuine longing to commune with our Creator."

Jesus Freak Hideout's Scott Fryberger said "The Heartbeat is a worthwhile investment. It won't be free like The Being Human Project still is, but if you lay down the dough for it, you probably won't regret doing so."

Louder Than The Music's Jono Davies said the album contains "creative indie rock worship with clever use of instruments and lyrics that declare who God is, and words to uplift us to carry on running the race hand in hand with God." Also, Davies wrote that "overall, a great album from these newbies, hopefully more will come from these guys called Bellarive."

New Release Tuesday's Marcus Hathcock said "The Heartbeat is one of the top worship albums of this decade, and has the opportunity to sucker punch other people with worshipful encounters and moments they might not have expected."

Worship Leader's Mike Pueschell said the positives with the album are the "programming, gang vocals, crunchy guitars, and passionate vocals throughout...Rock anthems abound on this gem of an album." Plus, Pueschell wrote the negative are "There is no doubt this is music by which to lead your church family into worship, but only the more progressive (musically speaking) church families will find these arrangements suitable."

== Track listing ==
Track listing
No.	Title	Writer(s)	Length
1.	"Heartbeat"	Sean Curran, Melissa Mage, Mike Mage	5:16
2.	"Love Has Found Us"	Curran, Mage, Mage	4:39
3.	"Hope is Calling"	Curran	3:47
4.	"Taste of Eternity"	Curran, Jason Ingram	5:39
5.	"Measures of Rest"	Curran, Zach Glotfelty, Mage, Mage	4:13
6.	"Sing"	Curran, Glotfelty, Mage, Mage	4:17
7.	"The Father's Heart"	Curran, Joshua Silverberg	4:07
8.	"Here We Are"	Curran, Melissa Mage	4:55
9.	"Tendons (the Release)"	Curran, Josh Luker, Melissa Mage	7:25
10.	"Shine On"	Curran, Luker, Mage, Mage	6:08
11.	"I Know You"	Curran, Mage, Mage	4:10
12.	"Stories"	Curran, Melissa Mage	8:20
Total length:			62:56

== Chart positions ==
Chart (2012)	Peak position
US Billboard Christian Albums	21
US Billboard Heatseekers Albums	17
