= Heartbeat (band) =

British Christian band

- Origin: Malmesbury, United Kingdom
- Genres: Christian; Pop; Dance
- Years active: 1981–91
- Labels: Kingsway Records, Priority Records
- Past members: Sue Rinaldi (vocals); Ian Townend (guitar); Steve Bassett (bass); Dave Bankhead (keyboards); Clive Urquhart (drums); Su Reeves-Bassett (backing vocals)

Heartbeat was a British Christian pop band active in the 1980s.

== Career ==
The band was based in Malmesbury in 1981, emerging out of the British Youth for Christ band led by Ray and Nancy Goudie, with a revolving group of musicians, and Sue Rinaldi joining as lead singer in 1986. The line-up by 1987 had stabilized as Rinaldi on lead vocals, Su Reeves-Bassett on backing vocals, Ian Townend on guitar, Steve Bassett on bass, Dave Bankhead on keyboards, and Clive Urquhart on drums.

The band was mostly a touring entity, with occasional albums released for the Christian market, but in 1987 sought commercial success by recording a single; "Tears From Heaven" - the title suggested by former lead singer Trish Morgan - on the RCA-distributed Priority Records label reached number 32 in the UK Singles Chart in November 1987, despite mutually inconsistent suspicions of both chart-hyping and an airplay boycott. The success of "Tears From Heaven" earned the band a spot on the 5 November 1987 edition of Top of the Pops.

A follow-up single, "The Winner", reached number 70 in April 1988, and the band played its last gig on 6 September 1991.
