= Heartbeat (2012 film) =

- Directed by: Romana Carén
- Written by: Romana Carén
- Produced by: WHAT ART - Creative Productions e.U.
- Starring: Romana Carén, Valentin Schreyer, Katrine Eichberger
- Cinematography: Andreas Alvarez
- Release dates: June 6, 2012 (Vienna Short Film Festival); June 10, 2012 (Austria)
- Running time: 12 minutes
- Country: Austria
- Language: German

Heartbeat is a 2012 Austrian short film directed by Romana Carén, about a happily married couple learning about a life changing diagnosis. The film is based on the stage play "Wintervögel" which had its world premiere in 2010 at the Theater Drachengasse.

== Plot ==
Emilia and Bernhard Janes are over the moon when they learn that they are finally expecting a child. During a routine check they are confronted with a terrifying diagnoses. Emilia has cancer. Her chances to survive are good, but therefore she will have to start with the treatment immediately. The doctor suggests an abortion. While Bernhard is willing to sacrifice the baby in order to save his wife's life, Emilia is already too attached to the baby. Time is running out.

== Cast ==
- Romana Carén - Emilia Janes
- Valentin Schreyer - Bernhard Janes
- Katrine Eichberger - Doctor Wagner
