= Sticky & Sweet Tour (album) =

2010 live album by Madonna

Live album / video by Madonna
- Released: March 26, 2010
- Recorded: December 7–8, 2008
- Venues: River Plate Stadium (Buenos Aires, Argentina)
- Length: 62:14 (CD); 138:54 (DVD)
- Label: Warner Bros.
- Directors: Nathan Rissman; Nick Wickham

Madonna chronology
Celebration (2009)	Sticky & Sweet Tour (2010)	MDNA (2012)

Madonna video chronology
Celebration: The Video Collection (2009)	Sticky & Sweet Tour (2010)	MDNA World Tour (2013)

Sticky & Sweet Tour is the third live album by American singer and songwriter Madonna. It was released on March 26, 2010, by Warner Bros. Records. The album was released on DVD, Blu-ray and CD formats. The tour was filmed at the River Plate Stadium in Buenos Aires, Argentina during the 2008 leg of Madonna's Sticky & Sweet Tour. The album contains the performances from the tour, and thirteen songs in CD format, accompanied by photography by Guy Oseary. Before the official release, the show was broadcast on VH1 and was produced by Madonna's production company Semtex Films.

Madonna commented that she had not been able to focus on the development of the DVD as she was involved with the development of her directorial venture, titled W.E. Upon its release, Sticky & Sweet Tour received mixed reviews from critics, with one group criticizing it for being lifeless, while others praised the album for the performances. It became Madonna's 19th top-ten album on the Billboard 200, while it reached the top of the charts in Argentina, Greece, Hungary, Mexico, Portugal and the international album charts of Uruguay and Croatia. The album also reached top ten in the charts of Australia, Belgium, Canada, France, Japan, Sweden and Switzerland, but failed to reach top ten in Germany and the United Kingdom.

== Background ==
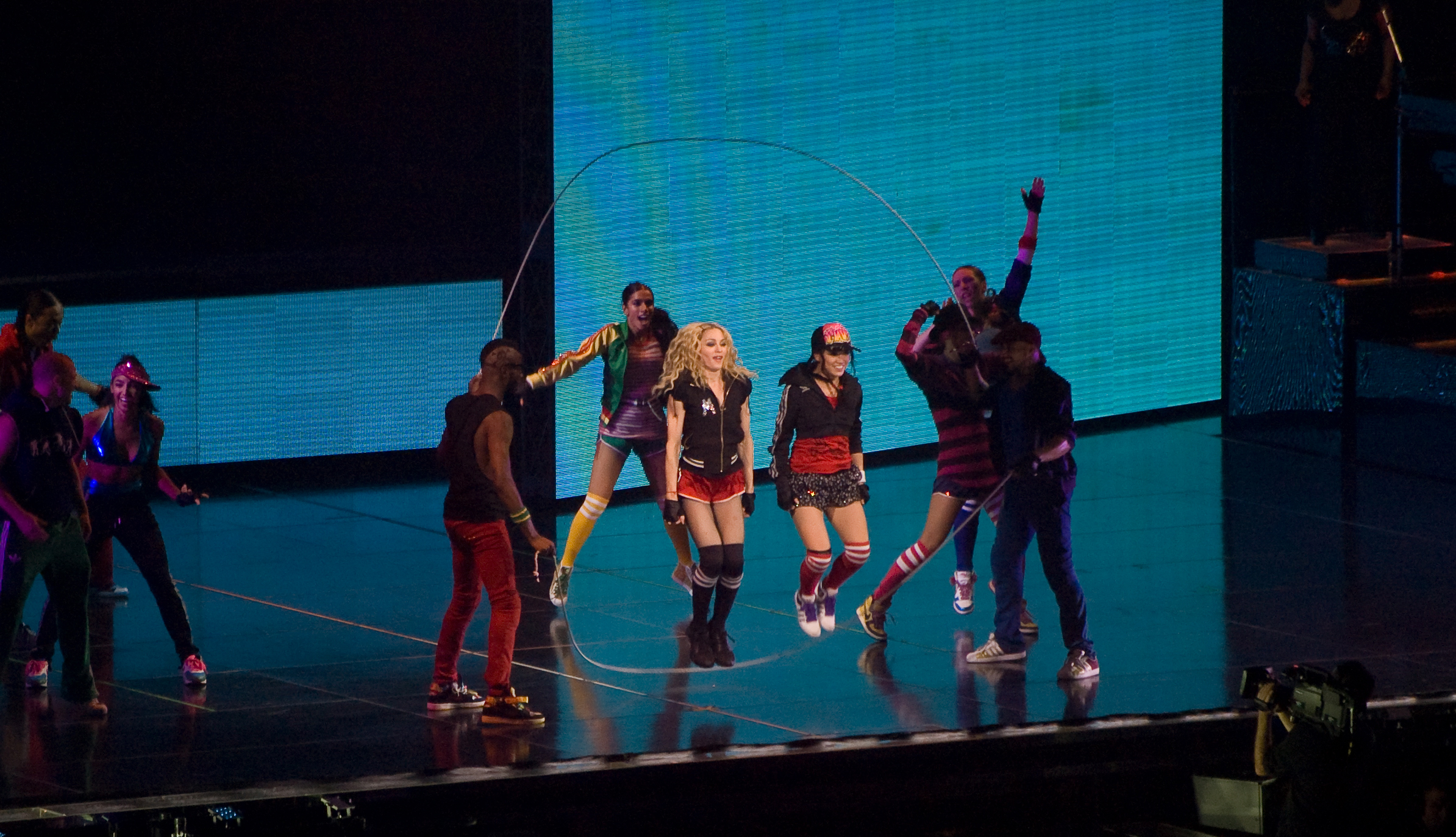
The performance of "Into the Groove" was considered a highlight of the tour.

The album was originally announced as Sticky & Sweet by Madonna's official website on January 12, 2010, with artwork depicting this title. This was later changed to Sticky & Sweet Tour and the packaging design was slightly altered with the additional wording, although the DVD and Blu-ray menu screen retains the original title announced. The album included 30 minutes of exclusive footage, filmed behind the scenes during the tour. The release included "Don't Cry For Me Argentina" which was only performed at the River Plate Stadium concerts. The photography used on the front cover is by Guy Oseary and is included in his book Madonna: Sticky & Sweet. The imagery is from the video interlude section of "Die Another Day" and has been slightly altered, removing the dancers on stage in the mock-boxing ring. The filmed tour footage was broadcast on VH1 on April 2, 2010, just a few days after the official release.

The DVD was released in the United States on April 6, 2010. Spin collaborated with Madonna's official website and launched a promotional campaign for the release, giving away an autographed DVD of the album, a Sticky and Sweet tour T-shirt, a tour photo book, an official tour program and a free one-year subscription to their website. During an April 2010 interview with Interview magazine, Madonna noted how she was not able to focus on the development of the DVD as she was involved in her directorial venture, W.E. She said,

"I haven't really been focused as much as I should be on the music part of my career because this movie has just consumed every inch of me. Between that and my four children, I don't have the time or the energy for anything else. For example, I do appreciate that lots of people worked long and hard putting together things like the DVD of the Sticky & Sweet Tour that we just released, and I have seen the finished product, but I have got no idea how people are going to find out about it or how it's going to be sold."

== Critical reception ==
Professional ratings
Review scores
Source	Rating
AllMusic	2/5 stars
Bloomberg Television	2.5/5 stars
Canada.com	4/5 stars
Digital Spy	3/5 stars
Entertainment Weekly	B+
Gaffa	2/6 stars
Tom Hull – on the Web	B+
The Independent	2/5 stars
Telegraph-Journal	4/5 stars
Rolling Stone	3.5/5 stars

Mikael Wood from Entertainment Weekly gave the video a B+ and commented, "This live CD-DVD can't replicate being there, Sticky & Sweet — taped in Buenos Aires in 2008 — does capture the show's rejuvenative streak, as on the electro-garage 'Hung Up'. Props, too, for a behind-the-scenes doc that actually goes behind the scenes." The Independent gave the release two out of five stars. The reviewer Andy Gill commented, "For all the multitude of crotches spread about the stage, this is as unenticing as pop gets, utterly lifeless despite the fervent activity." Mayer Nissim from Digital Spy felt that "Despite its absurd charm, this CD won't provoke the rediscovery of Hard Candy that it seems to nudge towards. That said, it's still an entertaining blast from start to finish. And with the DVD record of her outstandingly outlandish tour bundled in, this is definitely worth the entry price for anyone who still has even half an interest in the Queen Mum of Pop." Mark Beech from Bloomberg Television said that "It’s intriguing how note-perfect Madonna is while running around and doing splits." Rolling Stone gave the album three and a half out of five stars and wrote that it "featured stirring remixes, like a fresh mash-up of "Vogue" with the brassy funk of Hard Candy's "4 Minutes"."

Justin Kanter from Seattle Post-Intelligencer gave a positive review and commented on the performances: "Over the course of two full, uninterrupted hours comes an abundance of grandiose sets and effects; a voluminous line-up of dancers; precisely engineered sound and sequence; and sharply produced, celebrity-studded video clips. [...] Unquestionably, it’s Madonna and company’s actual show — the entire spectacle of song, dance, style, and attitude — that make the Sticky & Sweet Tour an invigorating and highly memorable happening." However, he felt that the performances of "Borderline" (1984) and "Human Nature" were disappointing. Ben Kaplan from Canada.com said "Sticky & Sweet is a document of a woman in her fifties who actually started peaking after most people thought she was through. Madonna doesn't speak with a British accent on her new record. But even if she did, it wouldn't really have mattered: Most of the stage banter is drowned out by the crowd's roar." He listed the performance of "Into the Groove" (1985) as a highlight of the tour. Tony clayton-Lea from The Irish Times said "Madonna has the experience to know what works and what doesn’t. It is this that makes Sticky Sweet such an interesting proposition: a superbly shot movie of the 'four-act' show that blends muscle with music, depth with deftness." Stephen Thomas Erlewine from Allmusic said "Since so much of the tour depended on overblown spectacle, Sticky & Sweet Tour is better experienced as a video instead of a CD – but even as a video this doesn’t rank among the best Madonna live albums, as there’s too much precision and not enough inspiration in the whole show."

== Chart performance ==
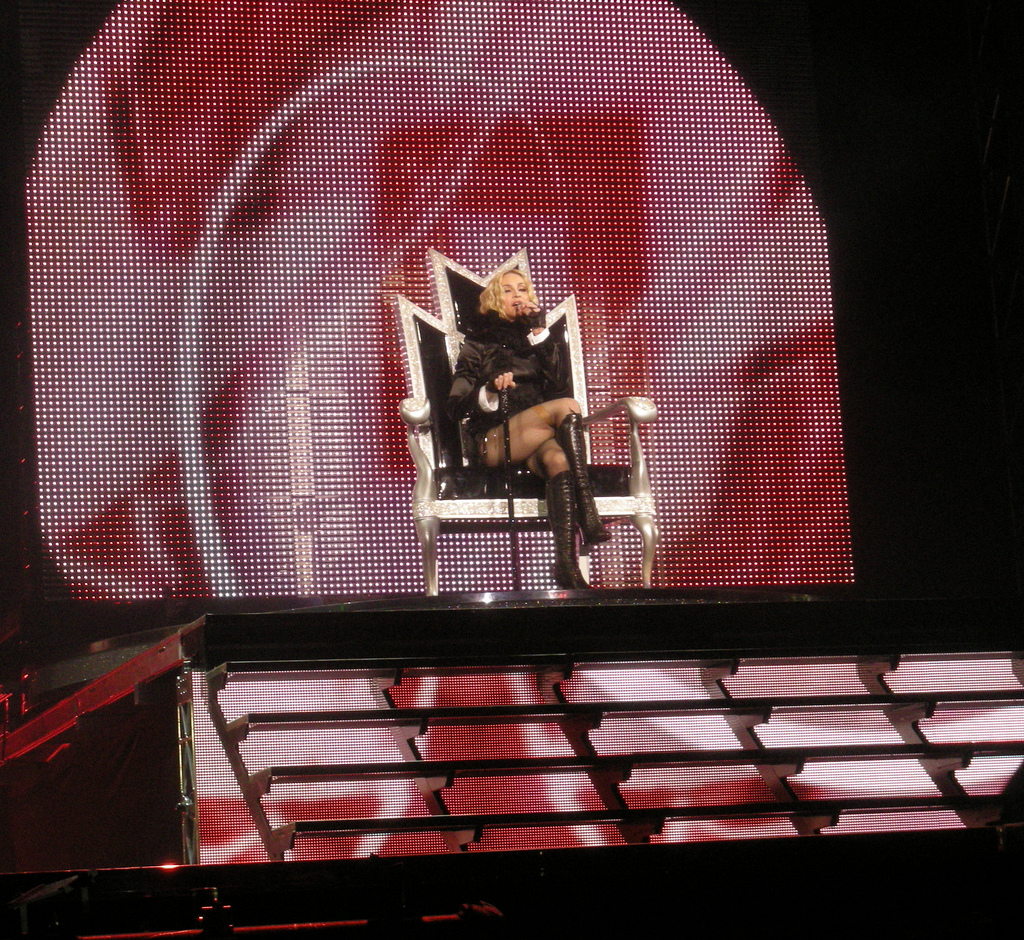
The DVD begins with the performance of "Candy Shop", which followed "The Sweet Machine" introduction video.

In the United States, the album was released on April 6, 2010, and entered the Billboard 200 chart at number ten, with first week sales of 28,000 according to Nielsen Soundscan. Sticky & Sweet Tour became Madonna's 19th top-ten album on the Billboard 200, thus tying her with Bob Dylan for sixth place among acts with the most top 10s in the chart's 54-year history, trailing The Rolling Stones (with 36), Frank Sinatra (33), The Beatles and Barbra Streisand (30) and Elvis Presley (27). However, only the CD/DVD set and digital audio-only counterparts were allowed to chart on the Billboard 200. The Blu-ray edition of the album charted on Billboard's Top Music Videos chart, debuting with sales of 5,000. It became Madonna's ninth number-one on that chart, extending her lead as the soloist with the most toppers in the 25-year history of the chart. Among all acts, only Bill and Gloria Gaither have more, with fifteen number-ones. The next week, Sticky & Sweet Tour dropped to position fifty-seven on the Billboard 200, selling 8,000 copies. It has sold 65,000 copies there, with sales of the Blu-ray version exceeding 17,000 copies. In Canada, the album debuted at three on the Canadian Albums Chart with sales of 6,000 copies.

In Japan, the album debuted and peaked at number ten on the Oricon Albums Chart, remaining on the chart for eight weeks. Sticky & Sweet Tour was her 20th top-ten entries on the chart, making Madonna the international artist with most top-ten albums in Japan, breaking the record previously held by The Beatles. She also became the oldest female artist to enter the top-ten in Oricon albums chart history. In Australia, the album charted on the ARIA DVD Chart at number three while entered the New Zealand Albums Chart at number 20. It was certified gold by the Australian Recording Industry Association (ARIA), for shipment of 10,000 copies there. In the United Kingdom, Sticky & Sweet Tour debuted outside the top ten at number 17 with sales of 12,405 copies according to the Official Charts Company. The album was also commercially successful in other musical markets, topping the charts in Mexico, Greece, Croatia, Norway, Hungary and Portugal, while attaining top-ten positions in the charts of Austria, Belgium (Flanders and Wallonia), Czech Republic, Finland, Ireland, Italy, Poland, Sweden, Switzerland and France. In the latter country, France, the album debuted in its first-week with 16,000 units. Sticky & Sweet Tour also reached number two on Billboard's European Top 100 Albums chart.

== Track listing ==
DVD/Blu-ray
No.	Title	Writer(s)	Sample(s)	Length
1.	"The Sweet Machine" (Intro)		"Manipulated Living", "Give It 2 Me", "4 Minutes"	3:30
2.	"Candy Shop" (medley)	Williams, Madonna	"Beat Goes On", "4 Minutes"	3:42
3.	"Beat Goes On" (medley; featuring Kanye West)	Williams, Madonna, Kanye West	"And the Beat Goes On"	4:28
4.	"Human Nature"	Madonna, Dave Hall, Shawn McKenzie, Kevin McKenzie, Milo Deering	"Gimme More", "What You Need"	3:53
5.	"Vogue" (2008)	Madonna, Shep Pettibone / Timberlake, Moseley, Hills	"Give It to Me", "4 Minutes"	4:31
6.	"Die Another Day" (2008)	Madonna, Mirwais Ahmadzaï	"Planet Rock", "Looking for the Perfect Beat"	3:00
7.	"Into the Groove" (2008)	Madonna, Stephen Bray	"Toop Toop", "It's like That", "Double Dutch Bus", "Apache", "Jump"	5:41
8.	"Heartbeat"	Williams, Madonna		4:52
9.	"Borderline"	Reggie Lucas		3:45
10.	"She's Not Me"	Williams, Madonna		4:39
11.	"Music" (2008)	Madonna, Ahmadzaï	"Put Your Hands Up 4 Detroit", "Last Night a DJ Saved My Life"	5:07
12.	"Rain/Here Comes the Rain Again"	Madonna, Pettibone / Annie Lennox, David A. Stewart	"Here Comes the Rain Again"	3:54
13.	"Devil Wouldn't Recognize You"	Madonna, Timberlake, Moseley, Hills, Joe Henry		5:29
14.	"Spanish Lesson"	Williams, Madonna		3:56
15.	"Miles Away"	Madonna, Timberlake, Moseley, Hills		4:48
16.	"La Isla Bonita" (medley)	Madonna, Patrick Leonard, Bruce Gaitsch / Eugene Hutz, Thomas Gobena, Oren Kaplan, Yuri Lemshev, Sergey Ryabtzev	"Pala Tute"	5:35
17.	"Me Darava/Doli Doli"	Alexander Kolpakov		3:04
18.	"You Must Love Me"	Tim Rice, Andrew Lloyd Webber		3:31
19.	"Don't Cry for Me Argentina"	Rice, Lloyd Webber		2:51
20.	"Get Stupid" (medley)	Williams, Madonna, West / Timberlake, Moseley, Hills, Hannon Lane	"Give It 2 Me", "4 Minutes", "Voices", "Beat Goes On"	3:02
21.	"4 Minutes" (featuring video performance by Justin Timberlake and Timbaland)	Madonna, Timberlake, Moseley, Hills		4:42
22.	"Like a Prayer" (2008)	Madonna, Leonard	"Feels Like Home"	5:32
23.	"Ray of Light"	Madonna, William Orbit, Clive Muldoon, Dave Curtiss, Christine Leach		8:51
24.	"Like a Virgin"	Tom Kelly, Billy Steinberg		2:53
25.	"Hung Up" (medley)	Madonna, Stuart Price, Benny Andersson, Björn Ulvaeus	"Gimme! Gimme! Gimme! (A Man After Midnight)", "A New Level"	6:06
26.	"Give It 2 Me"	Williams, Madonna		7:52
27.	"Credits"			5:42
28.	"Behind the Scenes"

CD
No.	Title	Writer(s)	Sample(s)	Length
1.	"Candy Shop" (medley)	Williams, Madonna	"Beat Goes On", "4 Minutes"	3:45
2.	"Beat Goes On" (medley; featuring Kanye West)	Williams, Madonna, West	"And the Beat Goes On"	4:24
3.	"Human Nature"	Madonna, Hall, S. McKenzie, K. McKenzie, Deering	"Gimme More", "What You Need"	3:52
4.	"Vogue" (2008)	Madonna, Pettibone / Timberlake, Mosley, Hills	"Give It to Me", "4 Minutes"	4:31
5.	"She's Not Me"	Williams, Madonna		4:38
6.	"Music" (2008)	Madonna, Ahmadzaï	"Put Your Hands Up 4 Detroit", "Last Night a DJ Saved My Life"	5:10
7.	"Devil Wouldn't Recognize You"	Madonna, Timberlake, Mosley, Hills, Henry		5:42
8.	"Spanish Lesson"	Williams, Madonna		3:52
9.	"La Isla Bonita" (medley)	Madonna, Leonard, Gaitsch / Hutz, Gobena, Kaplan, Lemshev, Ryabtzev	"Pala Tute"	5:34
10.	"You Must Love Me"	Rice, Lloyd Webber		3:45
11.	"Get Stupid" (medley)	Williams, Madonna, West / Timberlake, Mosley, Hills, Lane	"Give It 2 Me", "4 Minutes", "Voices", "Beat Goes On"	3:04
12.	"Like a Prayer" (2008)	Madonna, Leonard	"Feels Like Home"	5:31
13.	"Give It 2 Me"	Williams, Madonna		8:19

iTunes digital download edition
No.	Title	Writer(s)	Samples	Length
1.	"Candy Shop" (medley)	Williams, Madonna	"Beat Goes On", "4 Minutes"	3:45
2.	"Beat Goes On" (medley; featuring Kanye West)	Williams, Madonna, West	"And the Beat Goes On"	4:24
3.	"Human Nature"	Madonna, Hall, S. McKenzie, K. McKenzie, Deering	"Gimme More", "What You Need"	3:52
4.	"Vogue" (2008)	Madonna, Pettibone / Timberlake, Moseley, Hills	"Give It to Me", "4 Minutes"	4:47
5.	"Heartbeat" (bonus track)	Williams, Madonna		4:03
6.	"Borderline" (bonus track)	Lucas		3:46
7.	"She's Not Me"	Williams, Madonna		4:37
8.	"Music" (2008)	Madonna, Ahmadzaï	"Put Your Hands Up 4 Detroit", "Last Night a DJ Saved My Life"	5:10
9.	"Devil Wouldn't Recognize You"	Madonna, Timberlake, Mosley, Hills, Henry		5:42
10.	"Spanish Lesson"	Williams, Madonna		3:52
11.	"La Isla Bonita" (medley)	Madonna, Leonard, Gaitsch / Hutz, Gobena, Kaplan, Lemshev, Ryabtzev	"Pala Tute"	5:34
12.	"You Must Love Me"	Rice, Lloyd Webber		3:44
13.	"Get Stupid" (medley)	Williams, Madonna, West / Timberlake, Mosley, Hills, Lane	"Give It 2 Me", "4 Minutes", "Voices", "Beat Goes On"	3:04
14.	"4 Minutes" (bonus track)	Madonna, Timberlake, Mosley, Hills		4:40
15.	"Like a Prayer" (2008)	Madonna, Leonard	"Feels Like Home"	5:48
16.	"Ray of Light" (bonus track)	Madonna, Orbit, Muldoon, Curtiss, Leach		4:53
17.	"Give It 2 Me"	Williams, Madonna		8:19

Amazon digital download edition
No.	Title	Writer(s)	Samples	Length
1.	"Candy Shop" (medley)	Williams, Madonna	"Beat Goes On", "4 Minutes"	3:45
2.	"Beat Goes On" (medley; featuring Kanye West)	Williams, Madonna, West	"And the Beat Goes On"	4:24
3.	"Human Nature"	Madonna, Hall, S. McKenzie, K. McKenzie, Deering	"Gimme More", "What You Need"	3:52
4.	"Vogue" (2008)	Madonna, Pettibone / Timberlake, Mosley, Hills	"Give It to Me", "4 Minutes"	4:29
5.	"Borderline" (bonus track)	Lucas		3:46
6.	"She's Not Me"	Williams, Madonna		4:38
7.	"Music" (2008)	Madonna, Ahmadzaï	"Put Your Hands Up 4 Detroit", "Last Night a DJ Saved My Life"	5:10
8.	"Devil Wouldn't Recognize You"	Madonna, Timberlake, Mosley, Hills, Henry		5:42
9.	"Spanish Lesson"	Williams, Madonna		3:52
10.	"Miles Away" (bonus track)	Madonna, Timberlake, Mosley, Hills		4:49
11.	"La Isla Bonita" (medley)	Madonna, Leonard, Gaitsch / Hutz, Gobena, Kaplan, Lemshev, Ryabtzev	"Pala Tute"	5:34
12.	"You Must Love Me"	Rice, Lloyd Webber		3:44
13.	"Get Stupid" (medley)	Williams, Madonna, West / Timberlake, Mosley, Hills, Lane	"Give It 2 Me", "4 Minutes", "Voices", "Beat Goes On"	3:04
14.	"4 Minutes" (bonus track)	Madonna, Timberlake, Mosley, Hills		4:40
15.	"Like a Prayer" (2008)	Madonna, Leonard	"Feels Like Home"	5:48
16.	"Ray of Light" (bonus track)	Madonna, Orbit, Muldoon, Curtiss, Leach		4:53
17.	"Give It 2 Me"	Williams, Madonna		8:20

Notes

- "Don't Cry for Me Argentina" and "Like a Virgin" were only performed in Argentina.
- There are two iTunes versions: one has the above track listing and a digital booklet, the other has only the 13 tracks from the CD version and does not include the digital booklet.
- CD and DVD – Digipak case edition containing two discs: DVD of the concert and a CD containing 13 live tracks
- CD and Blu-ray – (Europe and Latin America only) Blu-ray case edition containing: High Definition version of the concert on Blu-ray and a CD containing 13 live tracks
- Blu-ray – Blu-ray case edition containing: High Definition version of the concert on Blu-ray
- iTunes Digital version 1 – contains the 13 tracks from the CD release with four bonus tracks "Heartbeat", "Borderline", "4 Minutes", "Ray of Light" and a digital booklet
- iTunes Digital version 2 – contains the 13 tracks from the CD release with three bonus tracks "Borderline", "4 Minutes" and "Ray of Light" (this version does not have a digital booklet)
- Amazon Digital version – contains the 13 tracks from the CD release with four bonus tracks "Borderline", "Miles Away", "4 Minutes" and "Ray of Light"

== Personnel ==
Adapted from the album liner notes.

- Directors – Nathan Rissman and Nick Wickham
- Broadcast director – Jamie King
- Production company – Semtex Films
- Producer – Sara Martin
- Executive producers – Madonna, Guy Oseary and Nicola Doning
- Photography – Darius Khondji
- Film editing – Jamie King, Nathan Rissman, Danny Tull
- Costume designer – Arianne Phillips

== Charts ==
=== Album ===
Chart (2010)	Peak position
Argentine Albums (CAPIF)	1
Australian Digital Albums (ARIA)	46
Belgian Albums (Ultratop Flanders)	4
Belgian Albums (Ultratop Wallonia)	4
Brazilian Albums (ABPD)	2
Canadian Albums (Billboard)	3
Croatian International Albums (HDU)	1
Czech Albums (ČNS IFPI)	2
Danish Albums (Hitlisten)	27
Dutch Albums (Album Top 100)	4
European Top 100 Albums (Billboard)	2
Finnish Albums (Suomen virallinen lista)	7
French Albums (SNEP)	6
German Albums (Offizielle Top 100 Charts)	11
Greek Albums (IFPI Greece)	1
Italian Albums (FIMI)	2
Japanese Albums (Oricon)	10
Mexican Albums (Top 100 Mexico)	1
New Zealand Albums (RMNZ)	20
Polish Albums (ZPAV)	5
Portuguese Albums (AFP)	1
Russian Albums (Lenta)	9
South Korean Albums (Circle)	11
South Korean International Albums (Circle)	2
Scottish Albums (Official Charts)	23
Spanish Albums (Promusicae)	3
Swedish Albums (Sverigetopplistan)	5
Swiss Albums (Schweizer Hitparade)	5
UK Albums (OCC)	17
US Billboard 200 (Billboard)	10

=== Monthly album charts ===
Chart (2010)	Position
Japanese International Albums (Oricon)	15
South Korean Albums (Gaon)	92
South Korean International Albums (Gaon)	14
Uruguayan International Albums (CUD)	1

=== Year-end album charts ===
Chart (2010)	Position
Argentine Albums (CAPIF)	10
Belgian Albums (Ultratop Flanders)	90
Belgian Albums (Ultratop Wallonia)	73
Croatian International Albums (HDU)	11
Dutch Albums (Album Top 100)	74
French Albums (SNEP)	106
Mexican Albums (Top 100 Mexico)	27
Mexican English Albums (Top 100 Mexico)	6
Russian Albums (Lenta)	74
Chart (2011)	Position
Argentine Albums (CAPIF)	10

=== DVD ===
Chart (2010)	Peak position
Australian Music DVD (ARIA)	3
Austrian Music DVD (Ö3 Austria)	3
Hungarian Music DVD (Mahasz)	1
Ireland Music DVD (IRMA)	2
Norwegian Top 10 DVD Audio (VG-lista)	2
US Top Music Video (Billboard)	1

=== Year-end DVD charts ===
Chart (2010)	Position
Czech Music DVD (ČNS IFPI)	1
Russian Music Blu-Ray (Lenta)	1

Chart (2019)	Position
Portuguese Music DVD (AFP)	146

== Certifications and sales ==
Album
Region	Certification	Certified units/sales
Argentina (CAPIF)	Gold	20,000^{^}
Canada	—	6,000 (Note: Canadian sales as of March 2010 according to Nielsen SoundScan.)
France (SNEP)	Gold	50,000^{*}
Greece (IFPI Greece)	Gold	3,000^{^}
Italy (FIMI)	Platinum	50,000^{*}
Japan	—	11,000 (Note: Japanese sales as of March 2010 according to Oricon.)
Mexico (AMPROFON)	Gold	30,000^{^}
Poland (ZPAV)	Gold	10,000^{*}
Russia (NFPF)	Gold	5,000^{*}
United Kingdom	—	12,405 (Note: UK sales as of March 2010 according to the Official Charts Company.)
United States	—	65,000 (Note: US sales figures as of December 2010 according to Nielsen SoundScan.)
^{*} Sales figures based on certification alone.^{^} Shipments figures based on certification alone.

Video
Region	Certification	Certified units/sales
Australia (ARIA)	Gold	7,500^{^}
Costa Rica (IFPI Costa Rica)	Gold	5,000
Czech Republic (ČNS IFPI)	2× Platinum	
Germany (BVMI)	Gold	25,000^{^}
United States	—	17,000
^{*} Sales figures based on certification alone.^{^} Shipments figures based on certification alone.

== Release history ==
Country	Date	Format(s)
Germany	March 26, 2010	CD/DVD Digipak; CD/Blu-ray; Blu-ray
Australia	March 26, 2010	CD/DVD Digipak; CD/Blu-ray; Blu-ray
Mexico	March 26, 2010	CD/DVD Digipak; CD/Blu-ray; Blu-ray
United Kingdom	March 29, 2010	CD/DVD Digipak; CD/Blu-ray; Blu-ray
France	March 29, 2010	CD/DVD Digipak; CD/Blu-ray; Blu-ray
Portugal	March 29, 2010	CD/DVD Digipak; CD/Blu-ray; Blu-ray
Brazil	March 29, 2010	CD/DVD Digipak; CD/Blu-ray; Blu-ray
Poland	March 29, 2010	CD/DVD Digipak; CD/Blu-ray; Blu-ray
Europe	March 30, 2010	CD/DVD Digipak; CD/Blu-ray; Blu-ray
Japan	March 31, 2010	CD/DVD Digipak; CD/Blu-ray; Blu-ray
United States	April 6, 2010	CD/DVD Digipak; CD/Blu-ray; Blu-ray

== See also ==
- List of number-one albums of 2010 (Mexico)
- List of number-one albums of 2010 (Portugal)
