= Sticky & Sweet Tour =

2008–2009 concert tour by Madonna

- World concert by Madonna
- Promotional poster for the tour
- Location: Eurasia; North America; South America
- Associated album: Hard Candy
- Start date: August 23, 2008
- End date: September 2, 2009
- Legs: 4
- No. of shows: 85
- Supporting acts: Paul Oakenfold; Robyn; Benny Benassi; Bob Sinclar
- Box office: Billboard: US$408 million (Note: US$612.28 million in 2025 dollars.); Pollstar: US$411 million (Note: US$616.79 million in 2025 dollars.)

Madonna concert chronology
- Confessions Tour (2006); Sticky & Sweet Tour (2008–2009); The MDNA Tour (2012)

The Sticky & Sweet Tour was the eighth concert tour by American singer Madonna, launched in support of her eleventh studio album, Hard Candy (2008). It marked her first major undertaking under a new 360 deal with Live Nation. Following a series of promotional appearances, the tour was announced in May 2008 with shows across Europe and North America, and also marked her return to Latin America after fifteen years. Though initially planned, the tour did not visit Australia. The first leg began on August 23, 2008, at the Millennium Stadium in Cardiff, and concluded on December 21 at Morumbi Stadium in São Paulo. In early 2009, a summer extension was confirmed, focusing primarily on European markets; this second leg ran from July 4 at the O_{2} Arena in London to September 2 at Yarkon Park in Tel Aviv.

The show was divided into four thematic segments —Pimp, Old School, Gypsy, and Rave— and described as a "rock-driven, dancetastic journey". Critical reception was generally positive, with praise for the tour's production values, choreography, and Madonna's stage presence. Commercially, the tour was a major success: after earning $282 million ($421.69 million in 2025 dollars) it became the highest-grossing tour ever by a solo artist at the time. An additional $129 million ($192.9 million in 2025 dollars) was generated from the 2009 extension, bringing the final gross to $411 million ($614.59 million in 2025 dollars), making it the second highest-grossing tour of all time, behind only the Rolling Stones' A Bigger Bang Tour (2005―07). It remained the highest-grossing tour by a female artist for fifteen years.

The tour generated some backlash. A video interlude titled "Get Stupid" drew criticism for placing images of then-US Republican presidential candidate John McCain alongside those of Adolf Hitler and Robert Mugabe. During a 2009 concert in Bucharest, Madonna addressed discrimination against the Romani community in Eastern Europe, which was met with audible boos from the audience. The shows at Buenos Aires' River Plate Stadium were filmed and later broadcast as Madonna: Sticky & Sweet —first airing on Sky1, and subsequently on EPIX. The broadcast was released on DVD, Blu-ray, and CD in 2010 under the title Sticky & Sweet Tour.

== Background ==
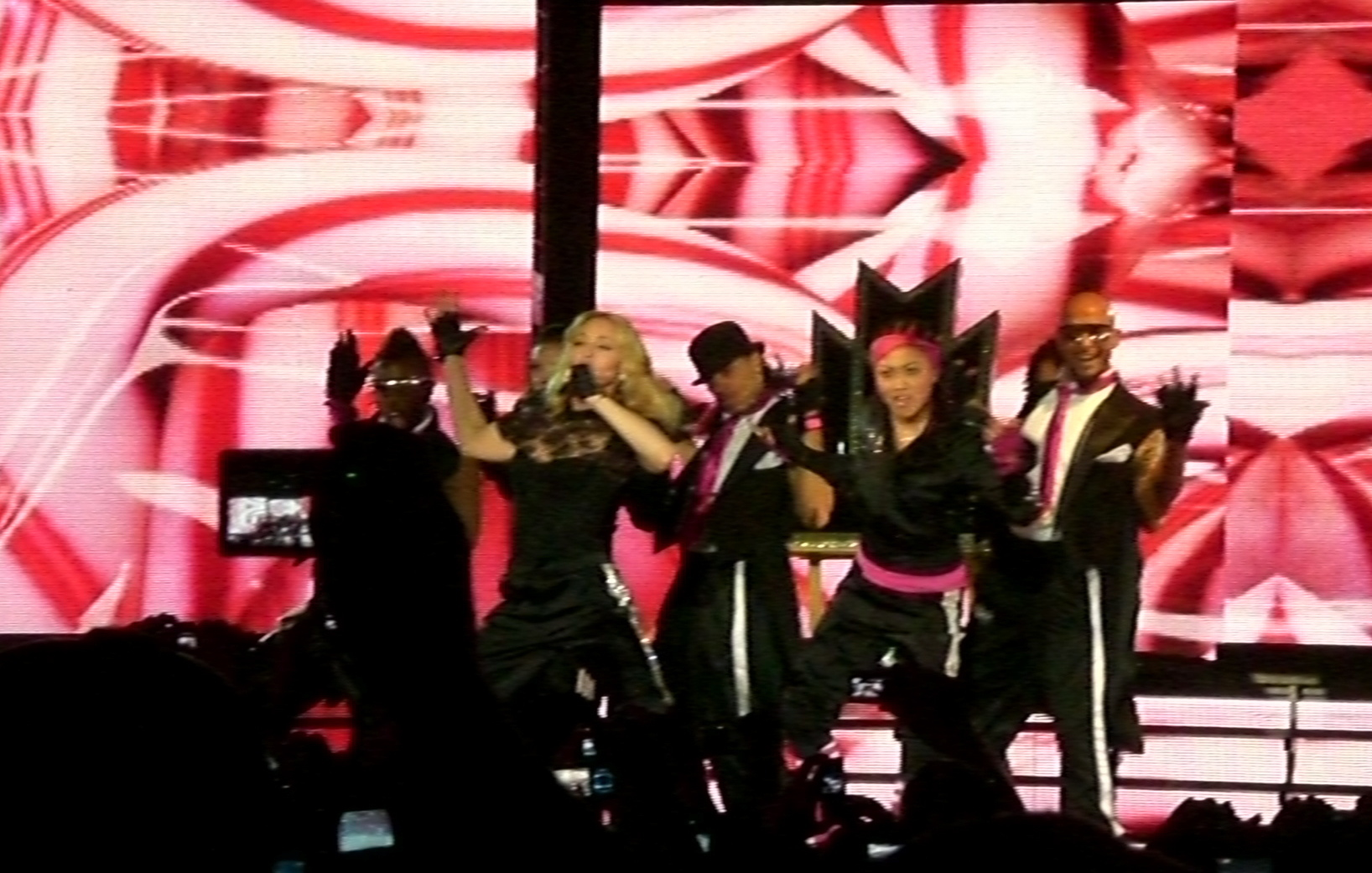
Madonna performing during the BBC Radio 1's Big Weekend, two months before kicking off the Sticky & Sweet Tour.

In October 2007, Madonna officially announced her departure from Warner Bros. Records, the label she had been signed to since the beginning of her career. She entered into a landmark $120 million, ten-year 360 deal with Live Nation, covering future music ventures including touring, merchandising, and sponsorships. In March 2008, The Sunday Telegraph reported that Madonna was planning to visit Australia, with promoter Michael Chugg saying a world tour "will happen" and was actively being discussed. Around the same time, the singer herself hinted at plans during an interview with Z100-FM, saying: "I might tour in the fall —it's still a possibility". One month later, the Daily Mirror revealed the tour would likely begin that September at London's Wembley Stadium, with negotiations underway.

Hard Candy, Madonna's final studio album under Warner Bros, was released on April 29, 2008. She promoted it with exclusive concerts at New York City's Roseland Ballroom, Paris' Olympia hall, and headlined the BBC Radio 1's Big Weekend. During a May 1 interview on On Air with Ryan Seacrest, she officially confirmed the tour. A week later, Live Nation and Arthur Fogel announced the Sticky & Sweet Tour —the first major undertaking under the new partnership. Kicking off in August, the tour spanned Europe, North America, and South America —marking her return to Mexico and Latin America for the first time since the Girlie Show of 1993. Although Australian dates were planned for January 2009, they were canceled for financial reasons. Instead, Madonna extended the tour through summer 2009 with a second European leg, kicking off July 4 at the O2 Arena in London, and concluding September 2 in Tel Aviv.

== Development ==
=== Conception and stage setup ===
According to author Daryl Easlea in Madonna: Blond Ambition (2012), the singer envisioned the Sticky & Sweet Tour as "bringing the dance floor to the stadium", and delivering a nonstop party, in contrast to the political and message-heavy Confessions Tour of 2006. The show was described as a "rock-driven, dancetastic journey" divided into four thematic acts: Pimp, a blend of 1920s deco and modern gangsta glam; Old School, referencing early 1980s New York dance culture and Keith Haring's art; Gypsy, inspired by Romani folk music and dance; and Rave, an energetic finale with Middle Eastern influences. Jamie King returned as creative director, with Kevin Antunes as musical director. The production involved 250 crew members, 69 guitars, 12 trampolines, and 100 pairs of kneepads, as reported by NME. The troupe was made up of Monte Pittman on guitar, backing vocalists Kiley Dean and Nicki Richards, 12 dancers including Sofia Boutella, and artists like Hamutsun Serve and the Kolpakov brothers Sasha and Vladim.

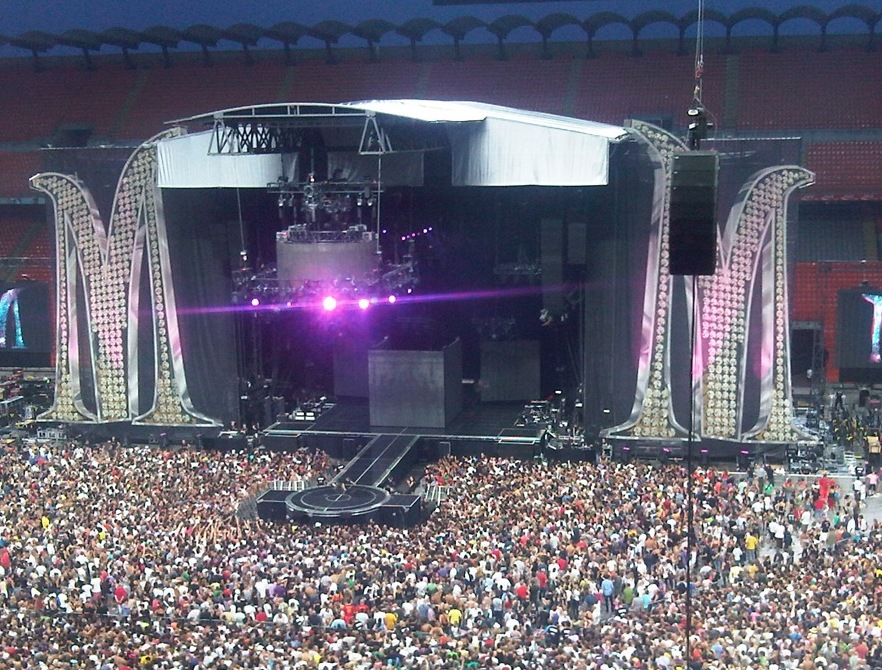
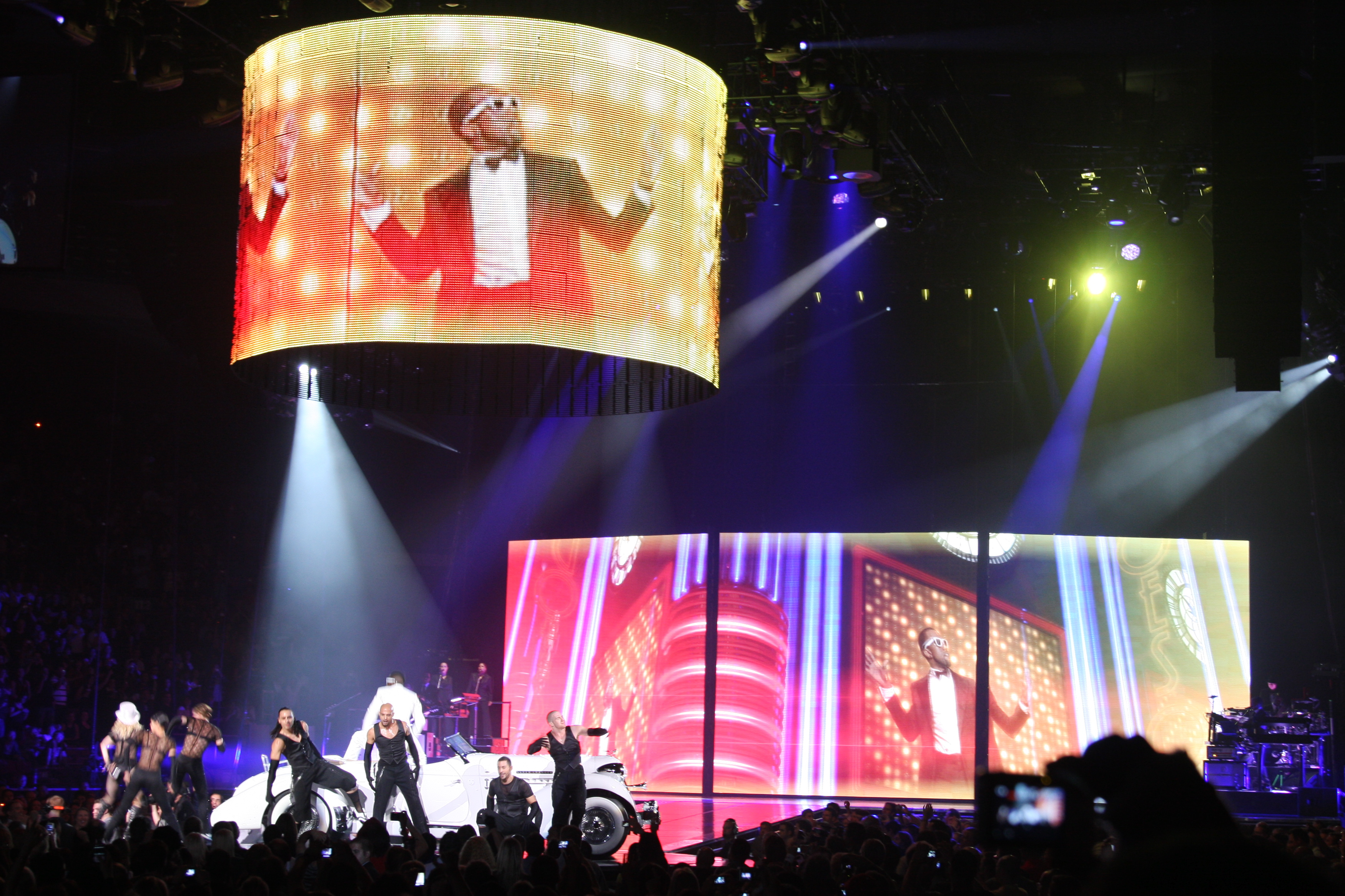
View of the stage, flanked by two giant "M"s (top), and the cylindrical ceiling screen featured in performances such as "Beat Goes On" (bottom) and "Devil Wouldn't Recognize You".

The stage, more compact than its predecessor's, was T-shaped with a conveyor belt runway leading to a B-stage, and a Swarovski-studded "M" on each side. Seventeen high-definition video screens —three measuring 20 ft × 20 ft (6.1 m × 6.1 m) — created a 60 ft (18 m) seamless backdrop, controlled via XLNT's InMotion3D software. These screens played a key role in the show's visual storytelling: during "4 Minutes" and "Beat Goes On", the panels shifted to create a dynamic, immersive environment for virtual duets with Justin Timberlake and Pharrell Williams. For "Devil Wouldn't Recognize You" and "Beat Goes On", a pair of concentric cylindrical stealth screens descended from above; though constructed from flat LED panels, they were customized into a rounded form using cable ties and small uprights, according to video engineer Jason Harvey.

The show's visuals were coordinated using Mac Pros, with footage arriving from London, New York, and Los Angeles. Highlights included brightly colored, childlike animations in the style of Keith Haring for "Into the Groove" (1985), and a video of Britney Spears trapped in an elevator during "Human Nature" (1995); Madonna described it as a metaphor for Spears' public struggles. For the 2009 extension, Marilyn Minter's Green Pink Caviar —featuring a giant tongue licking neon icing— accompanied opener "Candy Shop". Props used throughout the concert included a crystal-studded M-shaped throne, a 1935 Auburn Speedster, and a boxing ring.

=== Fashion ===
The Sticky & Sweet Tour featured a high-fashion wardrobe designed by Arianne Phillips with contributions from Riccardo Tisci for Givenchy, Stella McCartney, Jeremy Scott, and others. For the opening Pimp segment, Madonna donned a dominatrix-inspired Givenchy ensemble, including a black stretch satin frock coat with jet bead embroidery, paired with thigh-high boots by McCartney. Jeremy Scott designed the Old School look —custom Keith Haring sneakers and 1980s-inspired streetwear—paying tribute to both Madonna's early New York days and her friendship with Haring. Tisci also created the Gypsy act's wardrobe, including a black chiffon dress with multicolored ribbons and a dramatic fuchsia-lined silk cape. The final act, Rave, included Japanese-influenced outfits with sequined shoulder pads, while accessories throughout the show came from brands like Miu Miu, Moschino, Roberto Cavalli, and Tom Ford. Stylist Phillips noted Madonna's boldness, stating, "There are no vanity considerations based on her age". For the tour's 2009 extension, Tisci updated the Pimp look with a "super couture, sensual, goth, bondage"-themed outfit featuring black feathers. He called it, "an outfit that will make history", adding that Madonna "wants to be stronger". Male dancers wore new Brooks Brothers attire, including crisp white tuxedo shirts.

== Concert synopsis ==
=== Original ===
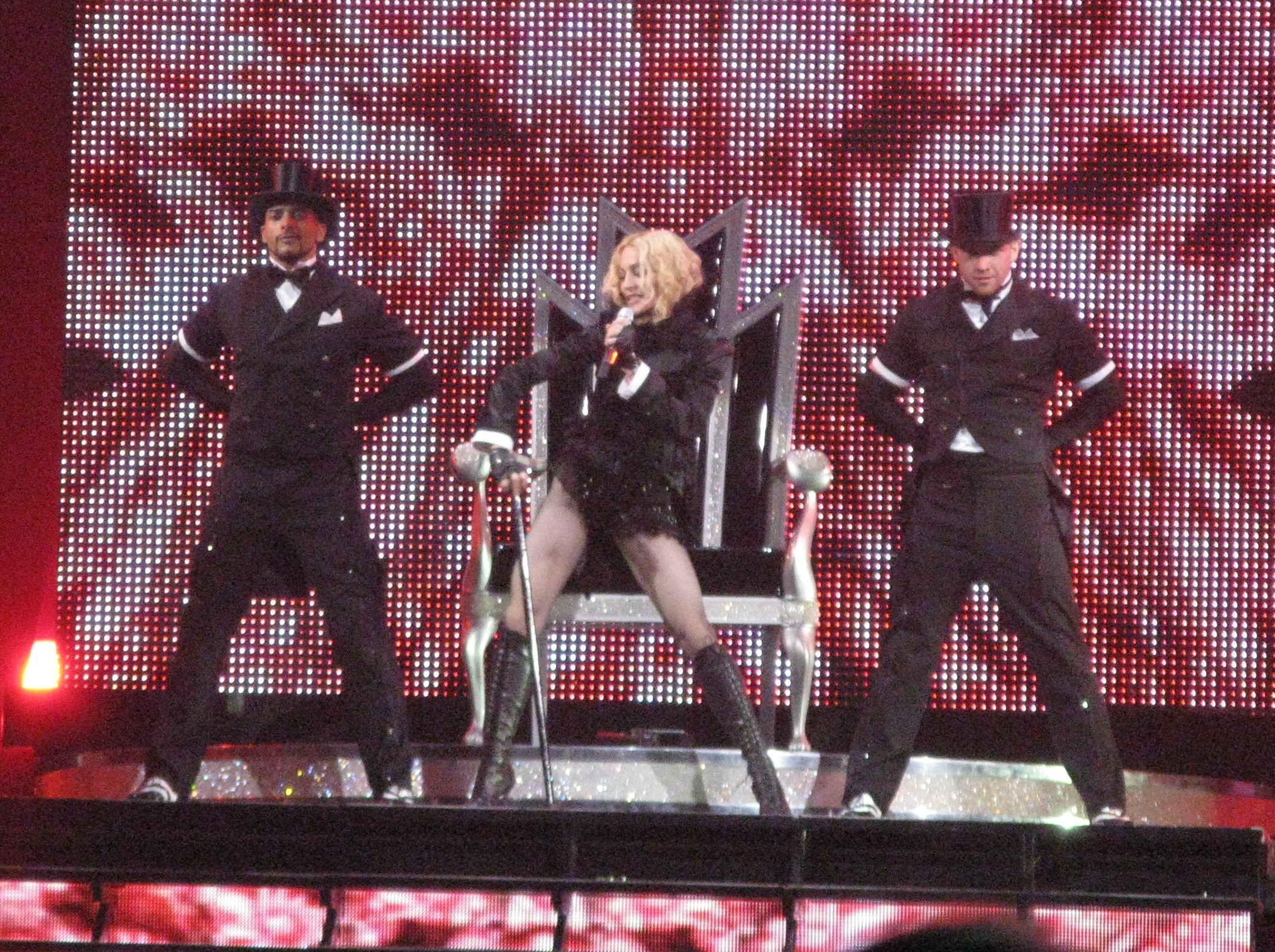
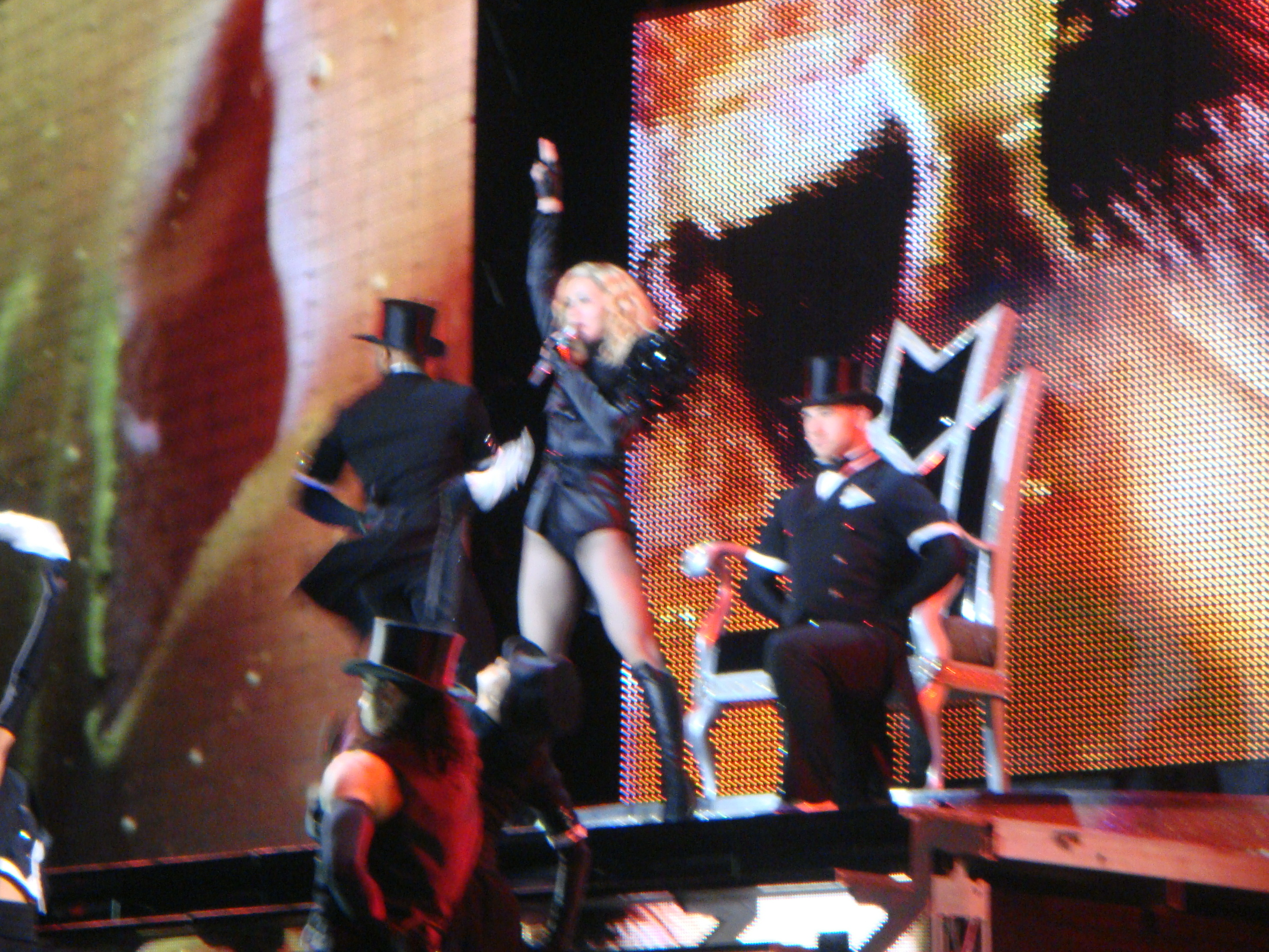
Opening number "Candy Shop" featured different outfits and backdrops for the 2008 (left) and 2009 (right) legs.

The concert opened with a 3D animation titled "The Sweet Machine", showing candy being processed like pinballs. Then, Madonna made her entrance on the M-shaped throne, dressed in Givenchy and flanked by dancers in bondage-inspired outfits for "Candy Shop." Giant LED screens flashed gumdrops and candy imagery. In "Beat Goes On", she rode the Auburn Speedster as Pharrell Williams and Kanye West appeared onscreen. A remixed guitar-led "Human Nature" followed, accompanied by the visuals of Britney Spears trapped in an elevator. The act concluded with a mashup of "Vogue" and "4 Minutes", and a video interlude set to a remix of "Die Another Day". The screens showed Madonna as a boxer, while dancers staged a choreographed fight in a boxing ring onstage.

"Into the Groove" kicked off the Old School act. The number featured a jump rope routine and double Dutch segment. Madonna, clad in retro gym wear, continued with "Heartbeat", where backup dancers manipulated her movements like puppeteers. A rock version of "Borderline" saw her on electric guitar, and "She's Not Me" added a self-referential touch with dancers impersonating her past looks from videos like "Like a Virgin" and "Material Girl". The act closed with "Music", set against a graffiti-covered subway backdrop, ending as the performers disappeared behind animated train doors.

The Gypsy segment opened with an interlude combining Madonna's own "Rain" and Eurythmics's "Here Comes the Rain Again" (1984), accompanied by an animated video of a pixie seeking shelter during a rainstorm, and an Asian-inspired dance by Hamutsun Serve. "Devil Wouldn’t Recognize You" followed, with Madonna singing atop a piano inside the cylindrical screen projecting storm imagery. She then performed "Spanish Lesson", featuring a flamenco solo by Vadim Kolpakov, and "Miles Away", accompanied by airport visuals. "La Isla Bonita" included elements of the Romani song "Lela Pala Tute" and a guest appearance by the Kolpakov Trio, who later performed "Doli Doli" as Madonna sat with her dancers. The act concluded with "You Must Love Me", with scenes from Evita (1996) playing on the screens.

The "Get Stupid" video interlude opened the Rave act. Set to a remix of "Beat Goes On", it showcased global issues like famine and climate change, and controversially compared political figures —pairing John McCain with Hitler and Barack Obama with Gandhi. Madonna then returned to the stage for "4 Minutes", joined by Justin Timberlake and Timbaland via screen projections. A remix of "Like a Prayer" followed, incorporating elements of "Meck's "Feels Like Home" and visuals featuring texts from major world religions. She played guitar on "Ray of Light", then invited the audience to request an "oldie but goodie", usually singing a snippet before launching into a rock-infused "Hung Up", which included the opening riff from Pantera's "A New Level" after guitarist Monte Pittman suggested the riff as guitar practice. After a short arcade-style video interlude, the show closed with "Give It 2 Me" and a crowd sing-along, ending as the words "Game Over" appeared onscreen.

=== 2009 revisions ===
Several notable updates were made for the 2009 extension. Green Pink Caviar was used as backdrop during "Candy Shop", which also had Madonna in the new Givenchy outfit. "Heartbeat" was replaced by "Holiday" (1983), which incorporated elements from the singer's debut single "Everybody" (1982), and her then-current single "Celebration". The number also paid tribute to Michael Jackson, who had passed before the tour resumed: dancer Kento Mori performed a medley of "Billie Jean" and "Wanna Be Startin' Something" (1983) in Jackson's signature look, complete with moonwalks across the stage. Other changes included swapping "Borderline" for "Dress You Up" (1985), reimagined with musical nods to the Knack's "My Sharona" (1979) and "God Save the Queen" (1977) by the Sex Pistols. "Hung Up" was cut in favor of a house-style version of "Frozen" (1998) which sampled Calvin Harris' "I'm Not Alone" and included lines from Madonna's own "Open Your Heart" (1987); footage from the Chris Cunningham-directed "Frozen" music video played on the screens. Before "Ray of Light", the screens displayed the quote: "If you want to make the world a better place, take a look at yourself and make a change"—a line from Jackson's "Man in the Mirror" (1988). For "Give It 2 Me", Madonna and the dancers all donned jeweled gloves on their right hands, another homage to Jackson.

== Critical reception ==
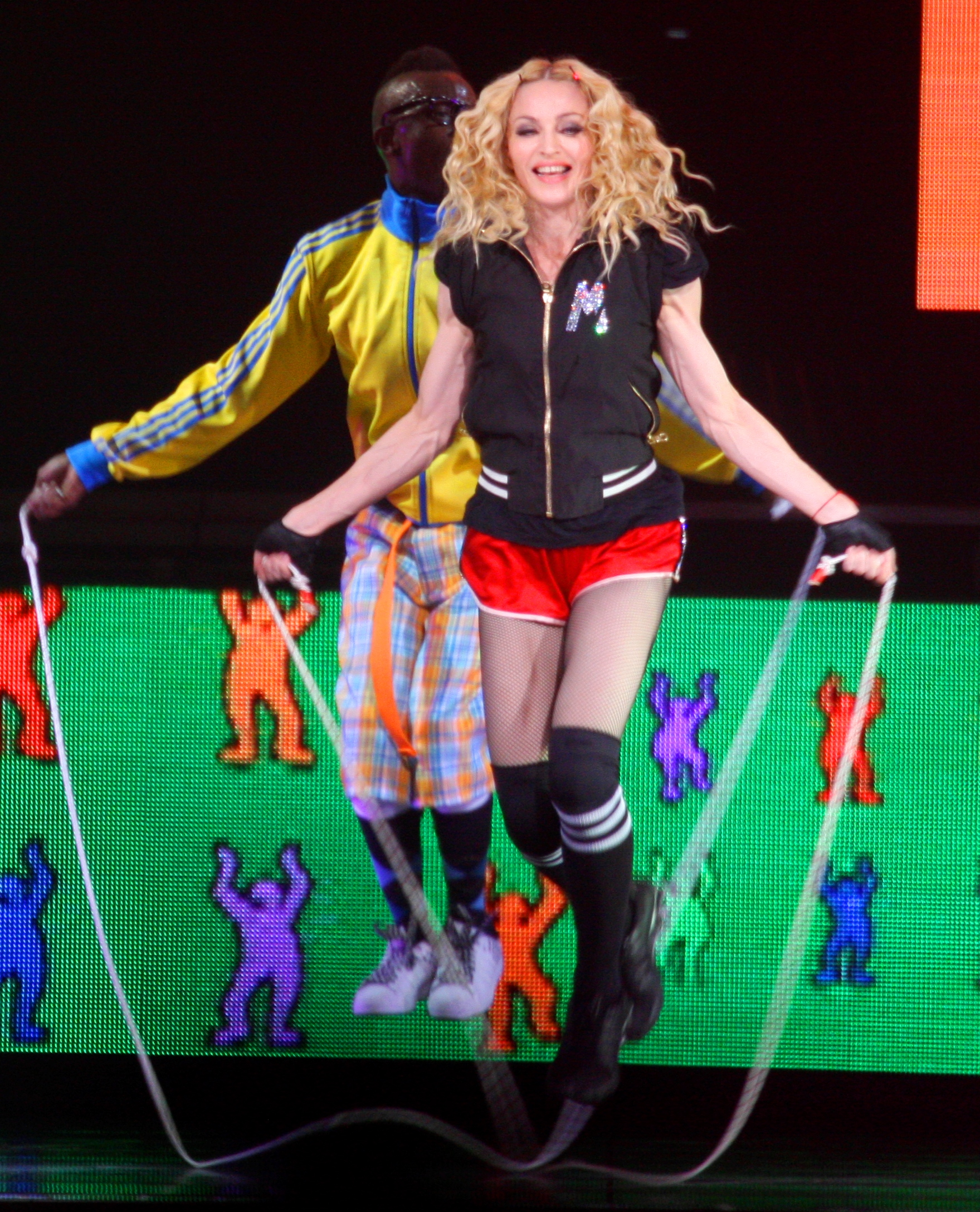
Madonna jumping rope during the performance of "Into the Groove", one of the numbers singled out by critics.

The Sticky & Sweet Tour received generally positive reviews, with critics praising Madonna's energy and production values. The Guardian's Amelia Hill remarked that the opening show in Cardiff proved, "the queen of pop is still into the groove", while Ian Youngs of BBC News described the concert as having the atmosphere of a "giant nightclub", albeit not to the liking of all purists. Darcy Wintonyk of CTV News called the show a "testament to the unstoppable energy" of the artist, shortly after turning 50. Dan Aquilante of the New York Post described it as Madonna's best tour up to that point, highlighting its "terrific" production and "well-thought-out" choreography. Jay N. Miller of The Patriot Ledger deemed the staging "world-class", and George Varga of SignOn San Diego described the visuals as "eye-popping". Boston Herald critic Jed Gottlieb went even further, referring to Sticky & Sweet as a show "no one can touch ―not JT, not MJ, not Pink Floyd; epic lasers, moving video screens, fast and flawless costume changes, all done with grace and energy".

Several reviewers commented on Madonna's continued cultural relevance. Nekesa Mumbi Moody from USA Today stated that although she's not the strongest vocalist or dancer, she remains "perhaps the greatest performer", adding that the show was filled with "throbbing dance music, tight choreography, spectacular stage sets and stunning visuals". Scott Cronik from The Press of Atlantic City called Madonna "the single most relevant female pop star in the world" at age 50. The Orlando Sentinel's Matthew Palm noted the concert's sustained energy and audience engagement, while the Chicago Tribune's Greg Kot observed that Madonna appeared "more relaxed" and "exuding warmth" compared to previous tours.

Critics also highlighted the set list's mix of old and new material. Dinah Alobeid of Blast magazine and Jane Stevenson from the Toronto Sun noted that tracks like "Heartbeat", "She's Not Me", and "Give It 2 Me" translated well into energetic, dance-driven numbers. Ricardo Baca from The Denver Post described "Into the Groove" as a "delightful explosion of color", and "La Isla Bonita" as a "triumph of reinvention". Moody noted that songs such as "Ray of Light" and "Like a Prayer" were given full performances with updated arrangements, rather than being relegated to medleys. The Daily Telegraph's Isabel Albiston praised the staging of "Music" and the energy of "Hung Up", while Slant Magazine's Paul Schrodt observed flashes of the singer's "Erotica-era cheekiness" in performances like "Vogue" and "Into the Groove".

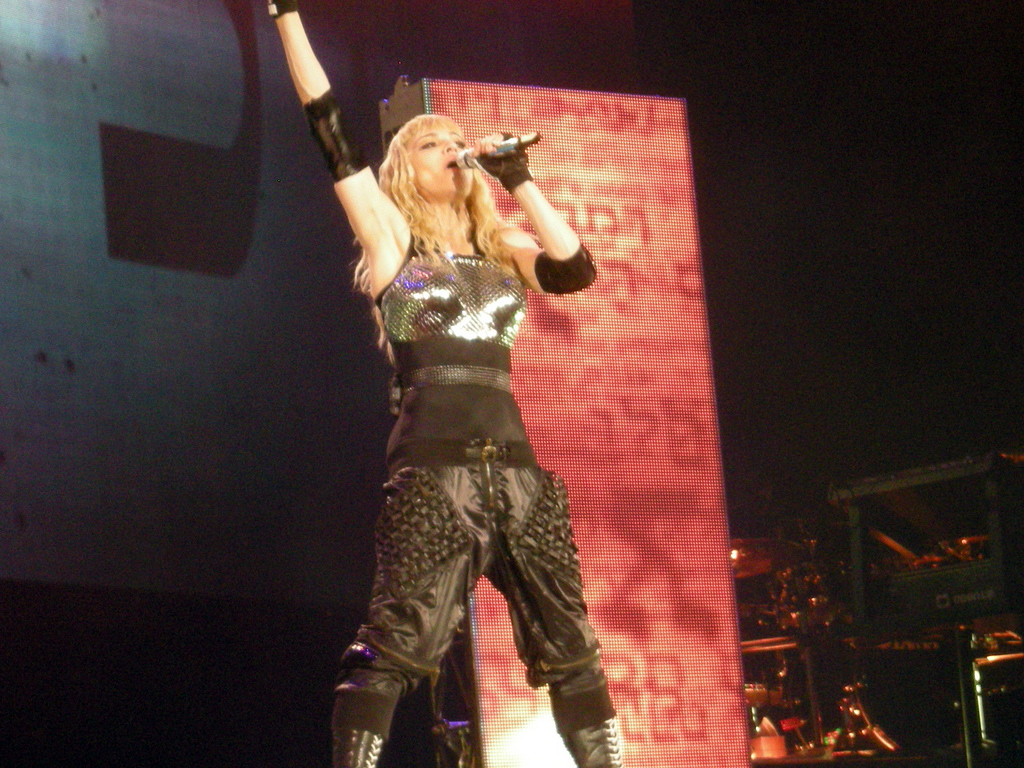
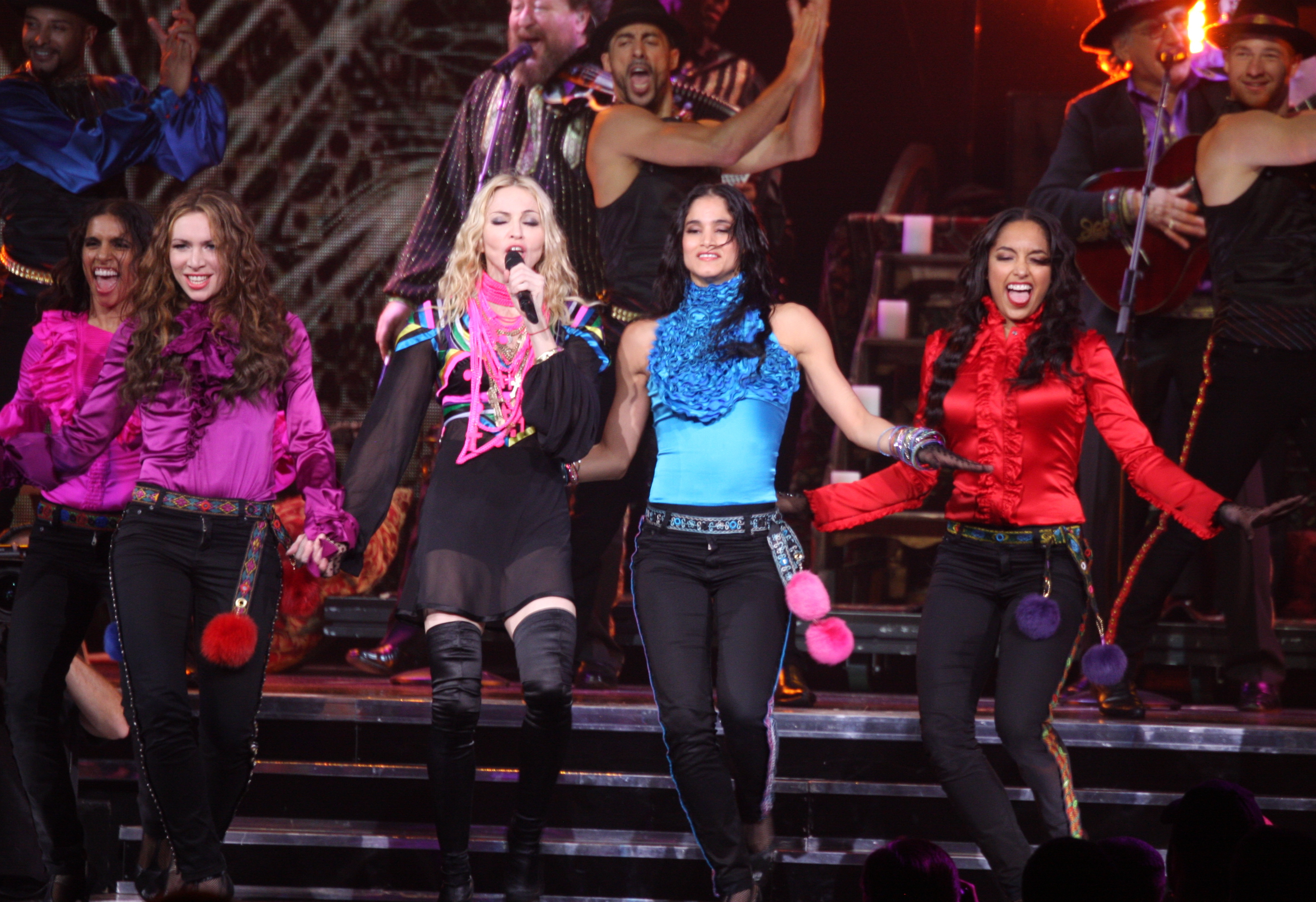
Performances such as "Like a Prayer" (left) and "La Isla Bonita" (right) were given praise.

Other critics offered more restrained commentary. Jim Harrington of the East Bay Times noted the absence of Madonna's typically conceptual or controversial elements, calling the tour relatively straightforward. Kitty Empire from The Guardian described it as "less sticky" in tone compared to previous outings. Albiston noted that parts of the show's early section lacked Madonna's usual confidence, while Kot found the production lacking in depth and particularly criticized the Gypsy segment. Guitar-led numbers were singled out by Schrodt and The New York Times' Jon Pareles as among the weaker moments, with Pareles characterizing the concert overall as "aerobic, not erotic". The Province's Stuart Derdeyn remarked on what he called "uncontrollable ego" in some segments, and Aidin Vaziri from the San Francisco Chronicle bluntly claimed some of the new songs felt like "Gwen Stefani's leftovers", suggesting Madonna was "falling behind the curve". Claudio M. de Prado from Spanish Website Jenesaispop offered a negative review, describing the show as underwhelming and "far less elegant and fluid" than Confessions. He further criticized the sound quality, visual presentation, and repetitive structure, concluding that the concert left portions of the audience disappointed.

Reception to the 2009 extension was mixed. Alex Macpherson of The Guardian praised the Michael Jackson tribute during "Holiday" but criticized the celebrity cameos and songs like "She's Not Me" as efforts to appear trendy. La Vanguardia's Lourdes López dismissed the Barcelona concert as a "low-intensity live show from which more was expected", and criticized Madonna's "irregular" vocals. Flemish newspaper De Morgen offered a particularly unfavorable review of the Werchter show, describing it as visually underwhelming and marred by pre-recorded vocals, constant costume changes that kept Madonna offstage, and arrangements that left the performance feeling like a "sound-mix" in which the singer was often "conspicuously absent". Although the review acknowledged her strong physical condition and singled out "Devil Wouldn't Recognize You" and "Like a Prayer" as highlights, it concluded that the concert was cold, detached, and "mediocre" for an artist of her caliber.

Lisa Verrico of The Times likewise noted the singer's reliance on pre-recorded vocals and heavily synthesized arrangements, but nonetheless argued that the concert "delivered in spades", praising the spectacle and describing Madonna as "magnificent". The author concluded that, "to criticize Madonna for placing style over substance is missing the point of the Queen of Pop [...] The music may have come second, but the highest-earning tour of 2008 still sparkles". Retrospective rankings were generally favorable: VH1's Christopher Rosa placed the tour sixth among Madonna's live outings, calling it "damn fun" and a "sugar rush". The Odyssey's Rocco Papa listed it seventh, while Billboard magazine placed it in the same position, noting that the Gypsy and Rave segments were, "as exhilarating as any of [Madonna's] previous tours' best moments". The Advocate's Gina Vivinetto ranked it fifth.

== Commercial reception ==
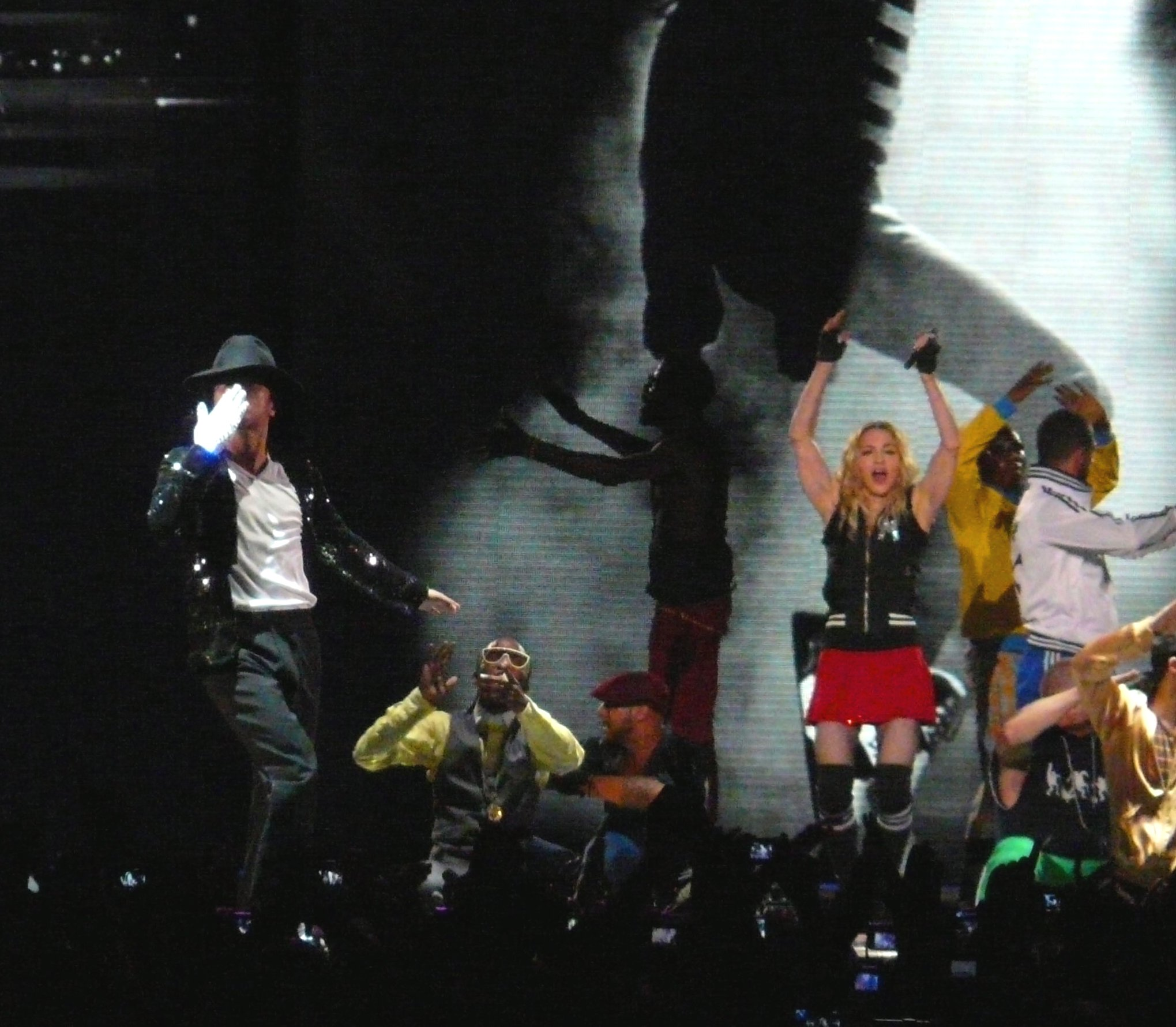
The tribute to Michael Jackson during the performance of "Holiday" on the 2009 extension. It grossed $222 million ($421.69 million in 2025 dollars) from 46 concerts.

Ticket prices for the Sticky & Sweet Tour ranged from $55 to $350, similar to Madonna's previous tours. By June 2008 —two months ahead of its launch— 90% of tickets had already sold, with Billboard projecting it would surpass the Confessions Tour to become the highest-grossing tour by a female artist. The tour broke several records during its 2008 run: over 72,000 people attended a single concert in Zürich, setting a national attendance record; in London, a show at Wembley Stadium drew 74,000 fans and grossed over $12 million, the highest in the venue's history; and two sold-out concerts at Paris' Stade de France grossed $17.5 million with over 138,000 attendees combined.

In North America, rapid sellouts and high demand in cities like Oakland, Las Vegas, Vancouver, Toronto, and Montreal led to additional dates. Madonna also set a decade record at Madison Square Garden with 23 sold-out shows since 2001. However, slower sales were noted in select stadium venues such as Los Angeles' Dodger Stadium and Miami's Dolphin Stadium. Conversely, demand in Mexico City remained strong, with 96,000 tickets selling out in just over two hours. The Latin American leg saw similarly high demand, including 60,000 tickets sold in three hours for a Buenos Aires show, and additional dates added in Rio de Janeiro, São Paulo, and Santiago de Chile. By year's end, Sticky & Sweet had grossed $282 million ($421.69 million in 2025 dollars), becoming not only the highest-grossing tour of the year but also the highest-grossing tour by a solo artist in history at the time.

Following the announcement of the 2009 extension, over one million tickets —worth approximately $100 million— were sold within days. Shows in London, Manchester, Oslo, and Belgium sold out rapidly, with Madonna breaking sales records in Tallinn and Helsinki; the latter drew 85,354 attendees, the highest for a solo artist in the Nordic countries. The first Gothenburg show sold over 55,000 tickets in two hours, and high demand in Tel Aviv prompted the addition of a second concert date.

The second leg grossed $222 million ($333.15 million in 2025 dollars) from 46 sold-out performances, bringing the tour's total gross to over $400 million ($612.28 million in 2025 dollars) from 85 concerts across 52 countries, with an attendance of 3.5 million people. It became the highest-grossing tour by a solo artist at the time and the second-highest-grossing tour overall, only behind the Rolling Stones' A Bigger Bang Tour (2005–07), which grossed $558 million ($866.42 million in 2025 dollars). At the 2009 Billboard Touring Awards, Sticky & Sweet won Top Boxscore, Top Draw, and Top Manager for Guy Oseary. The record for the highest-grossing tour by a female artist held for fifteen years, until it was surpassed by Taylor Swift's the Eras Tour in 2023.

== Incidents and reactions ==
The tour drew attention for a number of politically and socially charged moments. The "Get Stupid" video interlude sparked backlash for comparing Republican presidential candidate John McCain to Hitler and Robert Mugabe, while aligning Barack Obama with figures such as John Lennon and Gandhi; spokespeople from both campaigns criticized the montage as "outrageous" and "offensive". Later, Madonna openly celebrated Obama's electoral win during the concert at San Diego's Petco Park, declaring it "the best day of my life" as images of the president-elect and the words "We Won" appeared onscreen. The singer also repeatedly mocked vice presidential candidate Sarah Palin during the New Jersey and New York City shows, joking she was banned from concerts and threatening to "kick her ass" during a performance of "I Love New York". While attending the premiere of her directorial debut Filth and Wisdom, Madonna dismissed her threats to Palin as a metaphor.

In Europe, Madonna was fined £135,000 for overrunning her scheduled time at Wembley Stadium, and drew media commentary after dedicating "Like a Virgin" (1984) to Pope Benedict XVI during her Rome concert. A 2009 performance in Bucharest prompted jeers when she spoke out against Romani discrimination, stating her belief in "freedom and equal rights for everyone". Her publicist Liz Rosenberg later explained that the singer had been inspired to speak after touring with Roma musicians and would not comment further.

In Bulgaria, Madonna was criticized by the Bulgarian Orthodox Church for scheduling her concert on August 29, a day of fasting for Orthodox Christians, and for what the Church described as a "disrespectful and intolerant" attitude toward Christianity, accusing her of violating holy symbols in her performances. Similarly, in Poland, controversy arose when the concert date coincided with the Feast of the Assumption of the Blessed Virgin Mary; Marian Brudziński, a former member of the League of Polish Families (LPR), urged authorities to cancel the show, though Bishop Piotr Jarecki, then president of the Council for Social Affairs of the Polish Episcopate, later downplayed the issue, stating that the timing was likely a coincidence rather than an act of malice.

== Marseille stage collapse ==
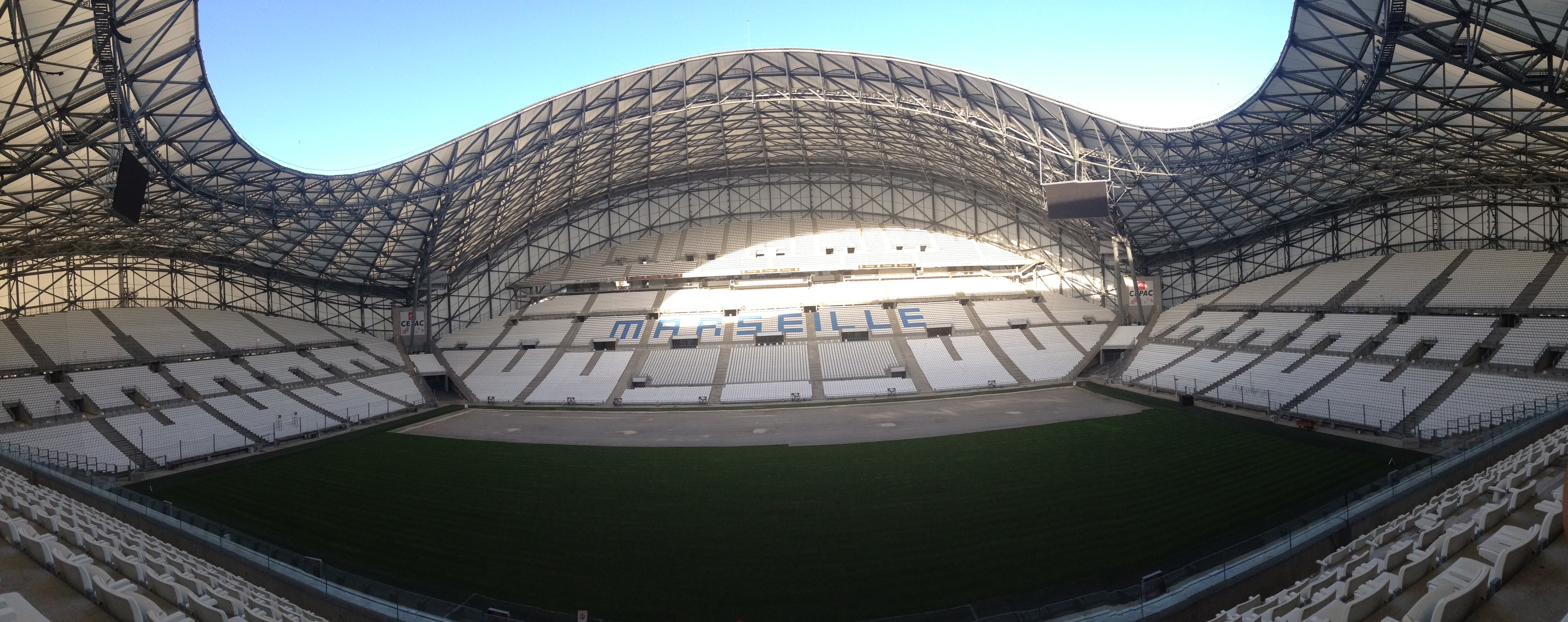
The planned concert at Marseille's Stade Vélodrome (pictured) was cancelled following an incident that killed two people.

On July 16, 2009, during preparations for Madonna's July 19 show at Marseille's Stade Vélodrome, part of the stage structure collapsed at approximately 17:15 GMT. The accident killed two workers —53-year-old Charles Criscenzo and 23-year-old Charles Prow— and injured eight others. According to officials, the roof became unstable while being lifted by cranes, causing one to topple. The concert was immediately canceled. At a later show in Udine, Madonna addressed the audience, asking for a moment of silence and expressing condolences. She visited Marseille on the day the show was scheduled, meeting with Criscenzo's family and hospitalized crew members. A public statement followed, in which she said she was "devastated" by the news.

Almost twelve years later, in February 2021, a French court found four people guilty of involuntary manslaughter and injury in connection with the collapse. Jacqueline Bitton, head of Live Nation France at the time, received a suspended two-year sentence and a €20,000 fine. Tim Norman, of the Edwin Shirley Group, was also given a suspended two-year sentence and fined €15,000. Two other managers involved received suspended sentences and fines. Live Nation France and Tour Concept were fined €150,000 and €50,000 respectively. Three other defendants were acquitted.

== Broadcast and recording ==
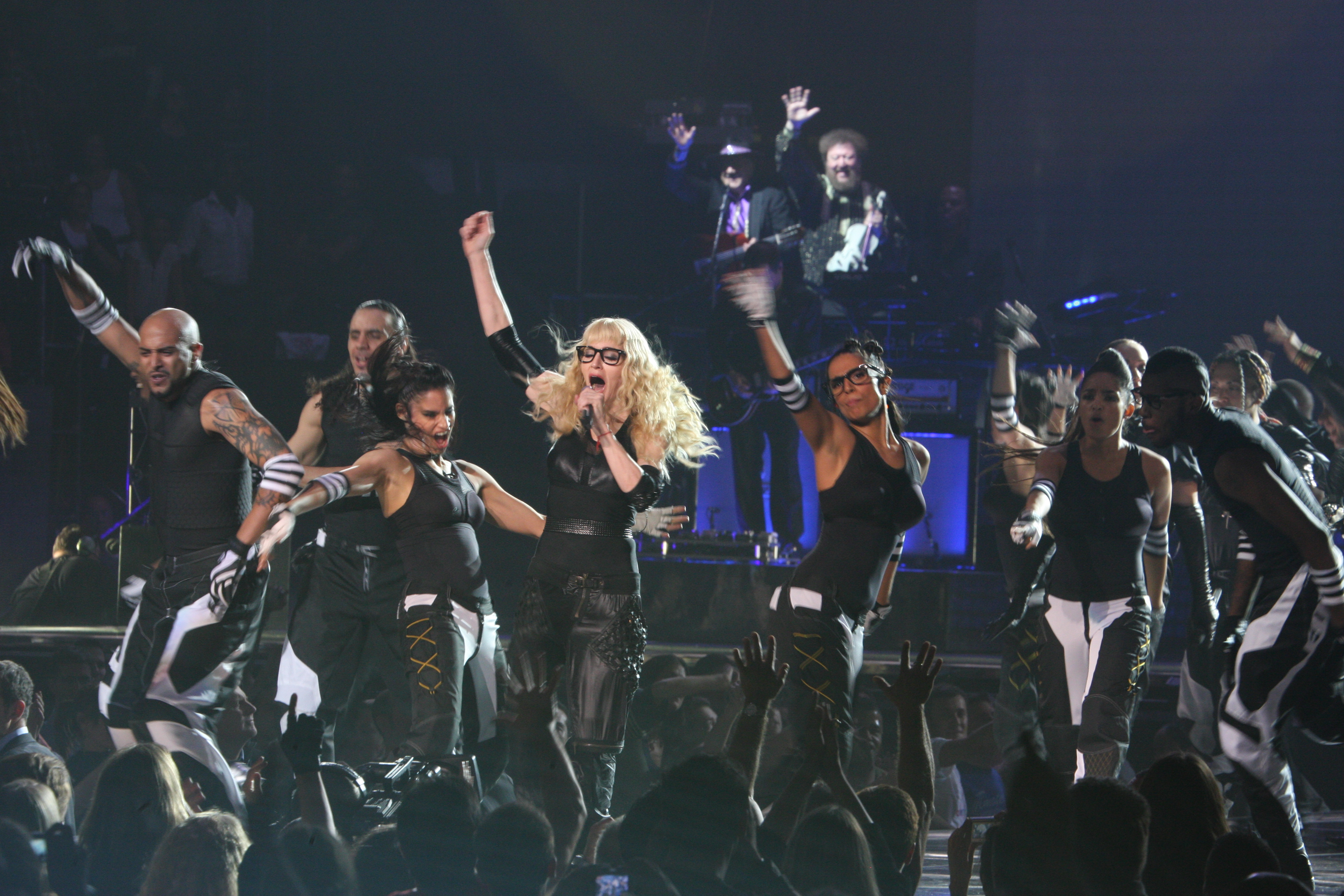
Madonna and the dancers performing the tour's final song, "Give It 2 Me".

On December 3, 2008, Madonna announced that her rescheduled Buenos Aires concerts would be filmed for a broadcast special. The resulting concert film, Madonna: Sticky & Sweet, was directed by Nathan Rissman, who had previously collaborated with her on the documentary I Am Because We Are. Produced by Live Nation, the special premiered on Sky1 on July 4, 2009. It was later broadcast on DirecTV's Cityvibe and, on October 30, aired on the US network EPIX where executive Mark Greenberg described it as the type of "iconic" event that would define the brand. The performance of "Into the Groove" was released online via Billboard to promote the EPIX premiere. The special also aired on VH1 in April 2010.

A home video release was confirmed on January 12, 2010, though Madonna was not directly involved in its editing, as she was focused on her directorial debut W.E. (2011). Titled Sticky & Sweet Tour, it was released on DVD, Blu-ray, and CD on March 30, featuring 30 minutes of bonus backstage footage. Critical reception was mixed; while some reviewers praised specific performances, such as "Into the Groove", others found the release less dynamic than her previous live albums. Despite this, it became Madonna's 19th top-ten entry on the Billboard 200. Separately, a companion photo book titled Madonna: Sticky & Sweet, curated by Oseary, was released in February 2010 through powerHouse Books.

== Set list ==
Set lists, samples and notes adapted per Madonna's official website, the notes and track listing of Sticky & Sweet Tour, and additional sources. (Note: Attributed to multiple references)

Act 1: Pimp

1. "The Sweet Machine" (Video introduction; contains elements of "Manipulated Living", "4 Minutes", and "Give It 2 Me")
2. "Candy Shop" (Contains elements of "4 Minutes" and "Beat Goes On")
3. "Beat Goes On" (Contains elements of "And the Beat Goes On")
4. "Human Nature" (Contains elements of "Gimme More" and "What You Need")
5. "Vogue" (Contains elements of "4 Minutes" and "Give It to Me")
6. "Die Another Day" (Remix; video interlude; contains elements of "Planet Rock" and "Looking for the Perfect Beat")

Act 2: Old School

7. "Into the Groove" (Contains elements of "It's like That", "Double Dutch Bus", "Toop Toop", "Apache", "Jam On It", and "Jump")
8. "Heartbeat"
9. "Borderline"
10. "She's Not Me"
11. "Music" (Contains elements of "Put Your Hands Up 4 Detroit", along with excerpts from "Last Night a DJ Saved My Life")

Act 3: Gypsy

12. "Rain" / "Here Comes the Rain Again" (Video interlude)
13. "Devil Wouldn't Recognize You"
14. "Spanish Lesson"
15. "Miles Away"
16. "La Isla Bonita" / "Lela Pala Tute"
17. "Doli Doli" (Performed by the Kolpakov Trio)
18. "You Must Love Me"

Act 4: Rave

19. "Get Stupid" (Video interlude; contains elements of "Give It 2 Me", "4 Minutes", "Voices", and "Beat Goes On")
20. "4 Minutes"
21. "Like a Prayer" (Contains elements of "Feels Like Home")
22. "Ray of Light"
23. "Hung Up" (Contains elements of "A New Level")
24. "Give It 2 Me"

=== Notes ===
- For the 2009 leg, "Heartbeat", "Borderline" and "Hung Up" were replaced with "Holiday", "Dress You Up" and "Frozen", respectively. "Holiday" incorporated elements of "Celebration" (2009) and "Everybody" (1982), as well as excerpts from several Michael Jackson songs; "Dress You Up" contained elements of "My Sharona" (1979), "God Save the Queen" (1977), and "Mickey" (1981); and "Frozen" incorporated elements of "I'm Not Alone" (2009) and an excerpt from "Open Your Heart" (1986). "Ray of Light" additionally became the second-to-last number.
- During the 2008 leg, Madonna took requests from the audience and did a capella renditions of past songs; these included "Everybody", "Holiday", "Like a Virgin", "Material Girl", "Dress You Up", "Open Your Heart", "Express Yourself" (1989), "Secret" (1994), "Beautiful Stranger" (1999), "American Life" (2003), and "Sorry" (2005). (Note: Attributed to multiple references)
- Madonna sang "I Love New York" on the second concert in New York City, on October 7.
- During the third New York show on October 11, Madonna dedicated "You Must Love Me" to her daughter Lourdes in celebration of her twelfth birthday. That night, she was also joined onstage by Pharrell Williams for both "Beat Goes On" and "Give It 2 Me".
- Britney Spears and Justin Timberlake joined Madonna on the Los Angeles concert for "Human Nature" and "4 Minutes", respectively. Prior to the show, an equipment malfunction damaged part of the stage roof, affecting some lighting effects. Despite the setback, the singer proceeded with the performance, stating: "Even though my stage roof was damaged and some lights and effects aren't working, I want to do the show anyway because I don’t want to disappoint my fans".
- "Don't Cry for Me Argentina" was sung on the Buenos Aires concerts.
- In Copenhagen, Madonna and the audience sang "Happy Birthday" to her son Rocco, who turned nine that day.

== Shows ==
List of 2008 concerts
Date (2008)	City	Country	Venue	Opening act	Attendance (Tickets sold / available)	Revenue
August 23	Cardiff	Wales	Millennium Stadium	Paul Oakenfold	33,460 / 33,460	$5,279,107
August 26	Nice	France	Stade Charles-Ehrmann	Robyn	41,483 / 41,483	$4,381,242
August 28	Berlin	Germany	Olympiastadion	Robyn	47,368 / 47,368	$6,048,086
August 30	Zürich	Switzerland	Militärflugplatz Dübendorf	Robyn	70,314 / 70,314	$11,093,631
September 2	Amsterdam	Netherlands	Amsterdam Arena	Robyn	50,588 / 50,588	$6,717,734
September 4	Düsseldorf	Germany	LTU Arena	Robyn	35,014 / 35,014	$4,650,327
September 6	Rome	Italy	Stadio Olimpico	Benny Benassi	57,690 / 57,690	$5,713,196
September 9	Frankfurt	Germany	Commerzbank-Arena	Robyn	39,543 / 39,543	$6,020,706
September 11	London	England	Wembley Stadium	Paul Oakenfold	73,349 / 73,349	$11,796,540
September 14	Lisbon	Portugal	Parque da Bela Vista	Robyn	75,000 / 75,000	$6,295,068
September 16	Seville	Spain	Estadio La Cartuja	Robyn	47,712 / 59,258	$4,874,380
September 18	Valencia	Spain	Circuit Ricardo Tormo	Robyn	50,143 / 50,143	$4,941,980
September 20	Saint-Denis	France	Stade de France	Bob Sinclar	138,163 / 138,163	$17,583,211
September 21	Saint-Denis	France	Stade de France	Bob Sinclar	138,163 / 138,163	$17,583,211
September 23	Vienna	Austria	Danube Island	Robyn	57,002 / 57,002	$8,140,858
September 25	Budva	Montenegro	Jaz Beach	Robyn	47,524 / 47,524	$3,463,063
September 27	Athens	Greece	Olympic Stadium	Robyn	75,637 / 75,637	$9,030,440
October 4	East Rutherford	United States	Izod Center	Paul Oakenfold	16,896 / 16,896	$2,812,250
October 6	New York City	United States	Madison Square Garden	Paul Oakenfold	61,586 / 61,586	$11,527,375
October 7	New York City	United States	Madison Square Garden	Paul Oakenfold	61,586 / 61,586	$11,527,375
October 11	New York City	United States	Madison Square Garden	Paul Oakenfold	61,586 / 61,586	$11,527,375
October 12	New York City	United States	Madison Square Garden	Paul Oakenfold	61,586 / 61,586	$11,527,375
October 15	Boston	United States	TD Banknorth Garden	Paul Oakenfold	26,611 / 26,611	$3,658,850
October 16	Boston	United States	TD Banknorth Garden	Paul Oakenfold	26,611 / 26,611	$3,658,850
October 18	Toronto	Canada	Air Canada Centre	Paul Oakenfold	34,324 / 34,324	$6,356,171
October 19	Toronto	Canada	Air Canada Centre	Paul Oakenfold	34,324 / 34,324	$6,356,171
October 22	Montreal	Canada	Bell Centre	Paul Oakenfold	34,301 / 34,301	$5,391,881
October 23	Montreal	Canada	Bell Centre	Paul Oakenfold	34,301 / 34,301	$5,391,881
October 26	Chicago	United States	United Center	Paul Oakenfold	30,968 / 30,968	$5,777,490
October 27	Chicago	United States	United Center	Paul Oakenfold	30,968 / 30,968	$5,777,490
October 30	Vancouver	Canada	BC Place Stadium	Paul Oakenfold	52,712 / 52,712	$5,389,762
November 1	Oakland	United States	Oracle Arena	Paul Oakenfold	28,198 / 28,198	$4,964,765
November 2	Oakland	United States	Oracle Arena	Paul Oakenfold	28,198 / 28,198	$4,964,765
November 4	San Diego	United States	Petco Park	Paul Oakenfold	35,743 / 35,743	$5,097,515
November 6	Los Angeles	United States	Dodger Stadium	Paul Oakenfold	43,919 / 43,919	$5,858,730
November 8	Las Vegas	United States	MGM Grand Garden Arena	Paul Oakenfold	29,157 / 29,157	$8,397,640
November 9	Las Vegas	United States	MGM Grand Garden Arena	Paul Oakenfold	29,157 / 29,157	$8,397,640
November 11	Denver	United States	Pepsi Center	Paul Oakenfold	23,501 / 23,501	$4,434,020
November 12	Denver	United States	Pepsi Center	Paul Oakenfold	23,501 / 23,501	$4,434,020
November 16	Houston	United States	Minute Maid Park	Paul Oakenfold	41,498 / 41,498	$5,170,100
November 18	Detroit	United States	Ford Field	Paul Oakenfold	30,119 / 30,119	$2,395,900
November 20	Philadelphia	United States	Wachovia Center	Paul Oakenfold	13,790 / 13,790	$2,318,530
November 22	Atlantic City	United States	Boardwalk Hall	Paul Oakenfold	13,293 / 13,293	$3,321,000
November 24	Atlanta	United States	Philips Arena	Paul Oakenfold	14,843 / 14,843	$2,632,952
November 26	Miami Gardens	United States	Dolphin Stadium	Paul Oakenfold	47,998 / 47,998	$6,137,030
November 29	Mexico City	Mexico	Foro Sol	Paul Oakenfold	104,270 / 104,270	$10,428,743
November 30	Mexico City	Mexico	Foro Sol	Paul Oakenfold	104,270 / 104,270	$10,428,743
December 4	Buenos Aires	Argentina	River Plate Stadium	Paul Oakenfold	263,693 / 263,693	$18,274,292
December 5 (Note: This concert was set to take place two days earlier, but was rescheduled due to unforeseen technical difficulties.)	Buenos Aires	Argentina	River Plate Stadium	Paul Oakenfold	263,693 / 263,693	$18,274,292
December 7	Buenos Aires	Argentina	River Plate Stadium	Paul Oakenfold	263,693 / 263,693	$18,274,292
December 8 (Note: This concert was set to take place two days earlier, but was rescheduled.)	Buenos Aires	Argentina	River Plate Stadium	Paul Oakenfold	263,693 / 263,693	$18,274,292
December 10	Santiago	Chile	National Stadium	Paul Oakenfold	146,242 / 146,242	$11,385,499
December 11	Santiago	Chile	National Stadium	Paul Oakenfold	146,242 / 146,242	$11,385,499
December 14	Rio de Janeiro	Brazil	Maracanã Stadium	Paul Oakenfold	107,000 / 107,000	$7,322,269
December 15	Rio de Janeiro	Brazil	Maracanã Stadium	Paul Oakenfold	107,000 / 107,000	$7,322,269
December 18	São Paulo	Brazil	Estádio do Morumbi	Paul Oakenfold	196,656 / 196,656	$15,462,185
December 20	São Paulo	Brazil	Estádio do Morumbi	Paul Oakenfold	196,656 / 196,656	$15,462,185
December 21	São Paulo	Brazil	Estádio do Morumbi	Paul Oakenfold	196,656 / 196,656	$15,462,185

List of 2009 concerts
Date (2009)	City	Country	Venue	Opening act	Attendance (Tickets sold / available)	Revenue
July 4	London	England	The O_{2} Arena	Paul Oakenfold	27,464 / 27,464	$5,873,149
July 5	London	England	The O_{2} Arena	Paul Oakenfold	27,464 / 27,464	$5,873,149
July 7	Manchester	England	Manchester Evening News Arena	Paul Oakenfold	13,457 / 13,457	$2,827,517
July 9	Paris	France	Palais Omnisports de Paris-Bercy	Paul Oakenfold	15,806 / 15,806	$2,306,551
July 11 (Note: This concert was part of Werchter Boutique 2009.)	Werchter	Belgium	Werchter Festival Park	Paul Oakenfold	68,434 / 68,434	$7,190,295
July 14	Milan	Italy	San Siro	Paul Oakenfold	55,338 / 55,338	$6,507,798
July 16	Udine	Italy	Stadio Friuli	Paul Oakenfold	28,362 / 28,362	$3,236,277
July 21	Barcelona	Spain	Estadi Olímpic Lluís Companys	Paul Oakenfold	44,811 / 44,811	$5,010,557
July 23	Madrid	Spain	Vicente Calderón Stadium	Paul Oakenfold	31,941 / 31,941	$4,109,791
July 25	Zaragoza	Spain	Recinto de la Feria de Zaragoza	Paul Oakenfold	30,940 / 30,940	$2,015,381
July 28 (Note: This concert was set to take place one day earlier, but was rescheduled to fill the void left by the cancelled Hamburg show.)	Oslo	Norway	Valle Hovin	Paul Oakenfold	79,409 / 79,409	$10,481,500
July 30	Oslo	Norway	Valle Hovin	Paul Oakenfold	79,409 / 79,409	$10,481,500
August 2	Saint Petersburg	Russia	Palace Square	Paul Oakenfold	27,103 / 27,103	$4,431,805
August 4	Tallinn	Estonia	Tallinn Song Festival Grounds	Paul Oakenfold	72,067 / 72,067	$5,924,839
August 6	Helsinki	Finland	Jätkäsaari	Paul Oakenfold	85,354 / 85,354	$12,148,455
August 8	Gothenburg	Sweden	Ullevi Stadium	Paul Oakenfold	119,709 / 119,709	$14,595,910
August 9	Gothenburg	Sweden	Ullevi Stadium	Paul Oakenfold	119,709 / 119,709	$14,595,910
August 11	Copenhagen	Denmark	Parken Stadium	Paul Oakenfold	48,064 / 48,064	$6,709,250
August 13	Prague	Czech Republic	Chodov Natural Amphitheater	Paul Oakenfold	42,682 / 42,682	$3,835,776
August 15	Warsaw	Poland	Bemowo Airport	Paul Oakenfold	79,343 / 79,343	$6,526,867
August 18	Munich	Germany	Olympiastadion	Paul Oakenfold	35,127 / 35,127	$3,655,403
August 22	Budapest	Hungary	Kincsem Park	Paul Oakenfold	41,045 / 41,045	$3,920,651
August 24	Belgrade	Serbia	Ušće Park	Paul Oakenfold	39,713 / 39,713	$1,738,139
August 26	Bucharest	Romania	Parcul Izvor	Paul Oakenfold	69,088 / 69,088	$4,659,836
August 29	Sofia	Bulgaria	Vasil Levski National Stadium	Paul Oakenfold	53,660 / 53,660	$4,896,938
September 1	Tel Aviv	Israel	Yarkon Park	Paul Oakenfold	99,674 / 99,674	$14,656,063
September 2	Tel Aviv	Israel	Yarkon Park	Paul Oakenfold	99,674 / 99,674	$14,656,063
Total					3,545,899 / 3,557,445	$407,803,266

=== Cancelled dates ===
List of cancelled concerts
Date (2009)	City	Country	Venue	Reason
July 8	Manchester	England	Manchester Evening News Arena	Technical Issues
July 19	Marseille	France	Stade Vélodrome	Stage collapse
July 28	Hamburg	Germany	Hamburg Bahrenfeld Trab Arena	Logistics Issues
August 20	Ljubljana	Slovenia	Hippodrome	Low ticket sales

== Personnel ==
Adapted from the Sticky & Sweet Tour programs.

=== Band ===
- Madonna – creator, vocals, guitar
- Nicki Richards - Background vocals
- Kiley Dean - Background vocals
- Kevin Antunes - musical director, keyboards, programmer
- Brian Frasier-Moore - drums
- Ric'key Pageot - piano, keyboards, accordion
- Monte Pittman - guitar, vocals, cowbell
- Eric Jao "DJ Enferno" - turntables
- Arkadiy Gips - violin, vocals
- Alexander Kolpakov - guitar, vocals
- Vladim Kolpakov - guitar, vocals, dancer
- Sean Spuehler - sound design
- Demetrius Moore - audience mic master

=== Dancers ===
- Leroy Barnes Jr. - dancer
- Sofia Boutella - dancer
- Jaron Boyd - dancer
- Emilie Capel - dancer
- Williams Charlemoine - dancer
- Paul Kirkland - dancer
- Jennifer Kita - dancer
- Kento Mori - dancer
- Yaman Okur - dancer
- Charles Parks IV - dancer
- Valeree Pohl - dancer
- Anthony Rue II - dancer
- Nilaya Sabnis - dancer
- Jason Young - dancer
- Rikiccho - dancer
- Dah-yoshi - dancer
- Tiffany Saxby - dancer

=== Choreographers ===
- Stefanie Roos - supervising choreographer
- Richmond Talauega - choreographer
- Anthony Talauega - choreographer
- Jamal Sims - choreographer
- Dondraico Johnson - assistant choreographer
- RJ Durell - choreographer
- Alison Faulk - assistant choreographer
- Aakomon Jones - choreographer
- Aljamaal Jones - choreographer
- Jason Young - choreographer
- Rikiccho - Hamutsun Serve choreography
- Dah-yoshi - Hamutsun Serve choreography
- Charles Parks - footwork choreography
- Prince Jron - footwork choreography
- Yaman Okur - abstract freestyle choreography
- Brahim Rachiki - tecktonik choreography
- Jason Lester - tecktonik choreography
- Natasha Bielenberg - Roma dance choreography
- Flii Stylez - locking choreography
- Danielle Polanco - waacking choreography
- Stephone Webb - double Dutch choreography
- Khadijah Maloney - double Dutch choreography assistant
- Stacey Hipps - double Dutch choreography assistant
- Shavonne Monfiston - double Dutch choreography assistant
- Julian Phillips - boxing trainer

=== Wardrobe ===
- Arianne Phillips - designer
- Riccardo Tisci for Givenchy - designer
- Tom Ford - designer
- Jeremy Scott - designer
- Dolce & Gabbana - designer
- Miu Miu - shoes designer
- Stella McCartney - shoes designer

=== Crew ===
- Jamie King - creative director
- Tiffany Olson - creative director assistant
- Tony Villenueva - Madonna's dresser, costume crew chief
- Dago Gonzales - video director
- Chris Lamb - video producer
- Eugene Riecansky - video director
- Steven Klein - video director
- James Lima - video director
- Nathan Rissman - video director
- Tom Munro - video director, tourbook photography
- David Nord - video producer, editor
- Robert “Bongo” Longo - Head Backline : Kevin Antunes Tech
- Giovanni Bianco - art direction, graphic design
- Guy Oseary - manager
- Liz Rozenberg - publicist
- Jeff Bertuch - media servers

== See also ==
- List of most-attended concert tours
- List of highest-grossing concert tours by women
- List of highest-grossing concert tours
