= You Must Love Me =

1996 single by Madonna

Single by Madonna

from the album Evita
- B-side: "Rainbow High"
- Released: October 21, 1996
- Recorded: September 1995
- Studio: CTS (London)
- Length: 3:09
- Label: Warner Bros.
- Composer: Andrew Lloyd Webber
- Lyricist: Tim Rice
- Producers: Nigel Wright; Alan Parker; Andrew Lloyd Webber

Madonna singles chronology
"Love Don't Live Here Anymore" (1996)	"You Must Love Me" (1996)	"Don't Cry for Me Argentina" (1996)

Music video
- "You Must Love Me" on YouTube

"You Must Love Me" is a song recorded by American singer and songwriter Madonna. It was written by Andrew Lloyd Webber and Tim Rice, for the 1996 film adaptation of the musical, Evita, based on the life of Argentinian leader Eva Perón. The song was released on October 21, 1996, by Warner Bros. as the lead single from the film's soundtrack. After years of not working together due to their individual projects, Lloyd Webber and Rice collaborated on creating a new track for the film, with the hope of obtaining an Academy Award nomination for Best Original Song. According to Lloyd Webber, the song's purpose was to showcase Perón's emotional state at the time as well as her relationship with her husband Juan Perón.

Madonna, who starred in the title role of the film, had tried to change the lyrics of the track to create a sympathetic portrayal of Perón, but was unsuccessful. She also undertook vocal lessons to record the songs for the film. "You Must Love Me" features instrumentation from cello and piano which accompanies Madonna's vocals. The song garnered positive response from music critics, many of them highlighting Madonna's enhanced singing ability. It went on to win the Golden Globe and the Academy Award for Best Original Song in 1997.

Commercially, "You Must Love Me" became a top-10 hit in some countries including Finland, Israel, Italy, Taiwan, and the United Kingdom, while reaching the top 20 in the United States. It was certified gold by the Recording Industry Association of America (RIAA) for shipments of 500,000 physical units. A music video, directed by Alan Parker, was released as promotion for the single. Madonna has performed the song at the 69th Academy Awards and on her 2008–09 Sticky & Sweet Tour.

== Background and development ==
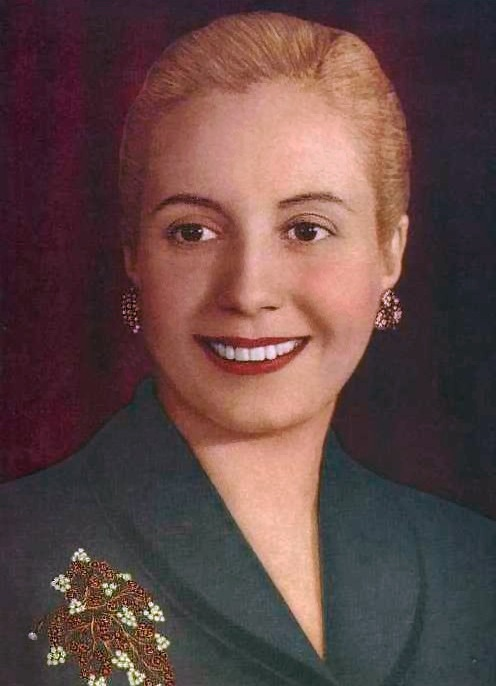
Madonna played the title character of Eva Perón (pictured).

In 1996, Madonna starred in the film Evita, playing the role of Eva Perón, the Spiritual Leader of the Nation of Argentina. For a long time, Madonna had desired to play Perón and even wrote a letter to director Alan Parker, explaining how she would be perfect for the part. After securing the role, she underwent vocal training with coach Joan Lader since Evita required the actors to sing their own parts. Lader noted that the singer "had to use her voice in a way she's never used it before. Evita is real musical theater — its operatic, in a sense. Madonna developed an upper register that she didn't know she had."

"You Must Love Me" was written by Andrew Lloyd Webber and Tim Rice, who had reunited for Evita after a ten-year creative separation due to their individual projects. It was written specifically for the film, so that it would contain new material and be eligible for an Academy Award nomination for Best Original Song. Madonna noted it as her favorite song from the film, recalling that the idea for "You Must Love Me" grew when Parker re-arranged the ending of the film from the original play, with the hopes of reuniting Rice and Lloyd Webber to create new music. According to Lloyd Webber, the purpose of the song was to showcase Perón's emotional state at the time as well as her relationship with her husband Juan Perón; "[Eva] is dying and she knows she's dying. One reason she is saying, 'You must love me', is out of desperation. She's also saying, 'You must love me because you must have always loved me', so it's a little word play, I guess, which Tim Rice has written", he explained. It was released as the soundtrack's first official single on October 21, 1996. Since its release, the song has been included in several productions of the play, including the 2006 London production and the 2012 Broadway revival.

== Recording and composition ==
Recording sessions for the film's songs and soundtrack began in September 1995, and took place at the CTS Studios in London; Madonna was accompanied by her co-stars Antonio Banderas and Jonathan Pryce. However, trouble arose as Madonna was not completely comfortable with laying down a "guide vocal" simultaneously with an 84 piece orchestra inside the studio. She was used to singing over a pre-recorded track and not have musicians listen to her. Also, unlike her previous soundtrack releases, she had little to no control over the project; "I'm used to writing my own songs and I go into a studio, choose the musicians and say what sounds good or doesn't [...] To work on forty-six songs with everyone involved and not have a big say was a big adjustment", she recalled. An emergency meeting was held between Parker, Lloyd Webber and Madonna where it was decided that the singer would record her part in a more contemporary studio while the orchestration would take place somewhere else. She also had alternate days off from the recording.

"You Must Love Me"
A 17 second clip of "You Must Love Me", with Madonna singing the chorus over the restrained piano sounds.

"You Must Love Me" starts with the sound of orchestra and piano, as Madonna sings the opening verses. She continues singing the lyrics, which talk about Perón's discovery that her husband Juan had actually loved her all along and not merely seen her as a political prop. Madonna disliked the lyrics since she wanted to portray Perón as a sympathetic figure, rather than the "shrewd manipulator" that Parker had in mind. She was also concerned about her own image, and was successful in getting many portions of the script altered. However, Rice declined to change the song's lyrics, but rewrote its instrumentation five or six times. He recalled, "I remember taking the lyrics to Madonna and she was trying to change them... The scene can be interpreted in different ways, but my lyrics were kept, thank God!"

Other instrumentation for the song includes cello, which was played by a live orchestra. As the song moves towards the chorus, the piano sounds stop and the cello plays with Madonna belting out the lyrics: "Deep in my heart, I'm concealing, Things that I'm longing to say, Scared to confess what I'm feeling, Frightened you'll slip away", when the piano and the orchestra sounds come back again. It proceeds in the same way and gradually fades out. "You Must Love Me" is set in common time, with a moderate tempo of 92 beats per minute. It is composed in the key of B♭ major, with Madonna's vocals spanning from G_{3} to B♭_{4}. The song has a basic sequence of B♭–E♭/B♭–F♭/B♭–B♭ in the beginning and changes to B♭–F♭ when Madonna sings the opening verse "Where do we go from here?".

== Critical response ==
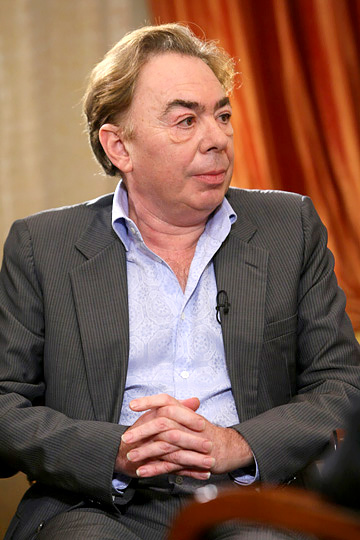
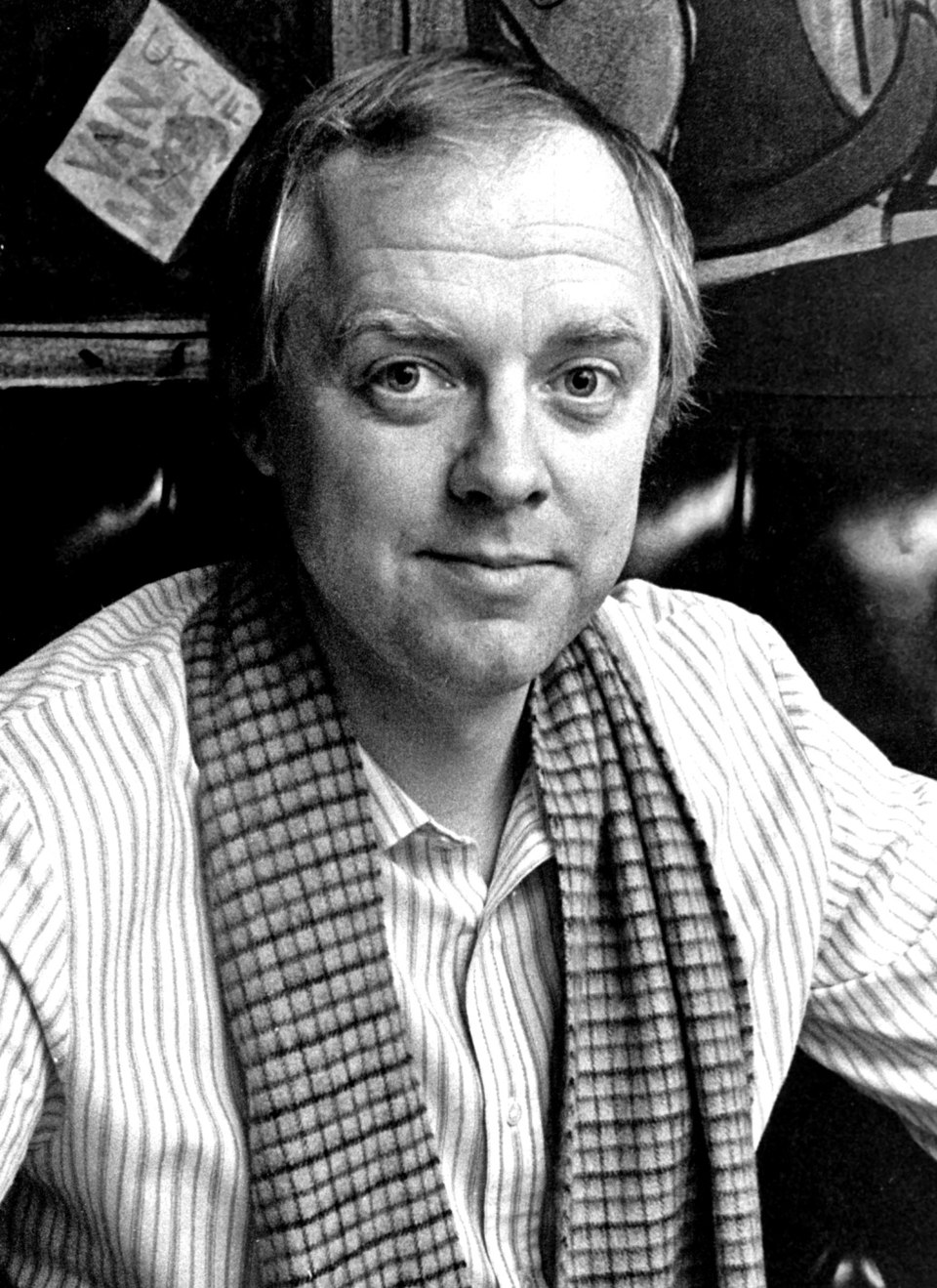
Co-writers of "You Must Love Me", Andrew Lloyd Webber and Tim Rice.

"You Must Love Me" received generally positive reviews from critics. Stephen Thomas Erlewine from AllMusic felt that "Even with the faults, Evita has its merits, including the written-for-film ballad 'You Must Love Me'". Lucy O'Brien, author of Madonna: Like an Icon, appreciated the song's addition to the soundtrack and found "pathos" in Madonna's vocals. Peter Keough, from the Boston Phoenix, wrote that, "['You Must Love Me'] is an aching farewell that dispels the illusion of a romance-of-convenience to reveal the inescapable love and tragedy beneath". Teresa Huang from The Tech, said it was "a beautiful addition to an already powerful score".

Larry Flick, from Billboard, called it "a momentous musical event [...] a bittersweet and quietly theatrical ballad [written] specifically for Madonna". Kathleen Guerdo, also from Billboard, said that, "[Madonna] delivers what is by far one of the strongest vocal performances of her career, comfortably scaling to the song's demanding soprano heights while infusing it with delicate, heart-rending emotion. This bodes well for the creative potency of the rest of the soundtrack". Matthew Jacobs from HuffPost, placed it at number 61 of his list "The Definitive Ranking Of Madonna Singles". He explained that "[t]he vocal training Madonna endured for the movie pays off in this soprano serenade", but also noted that it "doesn't do much outside of the film". Similar thoughts were shared by Medium's Richard LaBeau. Spin's Annie Zaleski noted that "[Madonna's] performances on the Evita soundtrack demonstrated her astronomical growth as a vocalist", citing "her fragile-sounding pleas on the Oscar-winning 'You Must Love Me'" as an example. J. D. Considine, from The Baltimore Sun, said it was one of the "big songs" from the soundtrack.

On her review of Evita, Janet Maslin from The New York Times commented that, "Mr. Lloyd Webber and Mr. Rice have contributed a lilting new song, 'You Must Love Me', that's as suitable for weddings as it is for running South American countries". Entertainment Weekly's David Browne gave the song a rating of B and opined that, "['You Must Love Me'] is no 'Live to Tell' or 'Take a Bow'. But this simple, elegantly arranged showpiece from Evita is clearly intended to promote both the film and her new adult, matriarchal image". Greg Kot from the Chicago Tribune, called it "among the composers' finest works--a rare example of understatement with its sparse instrumentation, brevity and nuanced lyricism". Peter Travers from Rolling Stone called it "sympathy-begging". The song won the Golden Globe Award for Best Original Song at the 54th ceremony, which took place on January 19, 1997. Two months later, it was awarded the Academy Award for Best Original Song at the 69th Academy Awards. While ranking Madonna's singles, in honor of her 60th birthday, The Guardian's Jude Rogers placed "You Must Love Me" at number 50, calling it the singer's best performance from the film and pointing out the "emotional quaking desperation" in her voice.

Negative criticism came from the San Francisco Chronicle's Barbara Shulgasser, who wrote that, "['You Must Love Me'] didn't help a bit. Rice writes lazy, dumb lyrics that make no effort to correspond to the rhythms of the music". Also negative was Slant Magazine's Eric Henderson, who wrote that it "just barely misses taking the dishonor of being ranked the worst of the singles released from the soundtrack, it certainly chides that its entire mad existence was to push Andrew Lloyd Webber to an EGOT". In 2023, Billboard named "You Must Love Me" one of the worst Oscar-winning songs of all time.

== Chart performance ==
In the United States, "You Must Love Me" was serviced to radio on October 9, 1996. It was met with a positive response, garnering 118 plays the first week, and debuting at number 55 on the Hot 100 Airplay chart. The CD single was released on October 29, following public demands about the song; "Rainbow High" from the film was added as its B-side. It debuted on the Billboard Hot 100 at number 22 the week of November 14, 1996, ultimately peaking at number 18 after two weeks. In its opening week, "You Must Love Me" sold 29,000 units. It also ranked at number 99 on the year end chart for 1997. According to Billboard, "You Must Love Me" was Madonna's fourth highest debuting single of her career, following "You'll See" (number 8 in 1995), "Erotica" (number 13 in 1992) and "Rescue Me" (number 15 in 1991). It was also the highest charting Lloyd Webber-Rice collaboration since Helen Reddy's rendition of "I Don't Know How to Love Him", which reached number 13 in 1971. It eventually received a gold certification by the Recording Industry Association of America (RIAA) on October 22, 1998, for shipments of 500,000 copies. In Canada, the song debuted at number 36 on the RPM Top Singles chart, and reached a peak of number 11 on the week of December 16, 1996. It was present for a total of 14 weeks on the chart.

In the United Kingdom, the song reached a peak of number 10 on the UK Singles Chart the week of November 2, 1996, and was present on the top 100 for a total of 9 weeks. According to the Official Charts Company, the song had sold 90,428 copies by August 2008 in there. In Australia, "You Must Love Me" peaked at number 11 on the ARIA Singles Chart the week of November 10, 1996, staying on this position for one week and a total of 9 weeks on the chart. In Italy, it reached the fifth position on the Musica e dischi chart. "You Must Love Me" reached a peak of number 4 in Finland, and also reached a peak of number 21 on the Irish Singles Chart, where it remained for 2 weeks. In Germany, it became one of Madonna's lowest charting singles, peaking at number 78.

== Music video, live performances and covers ==
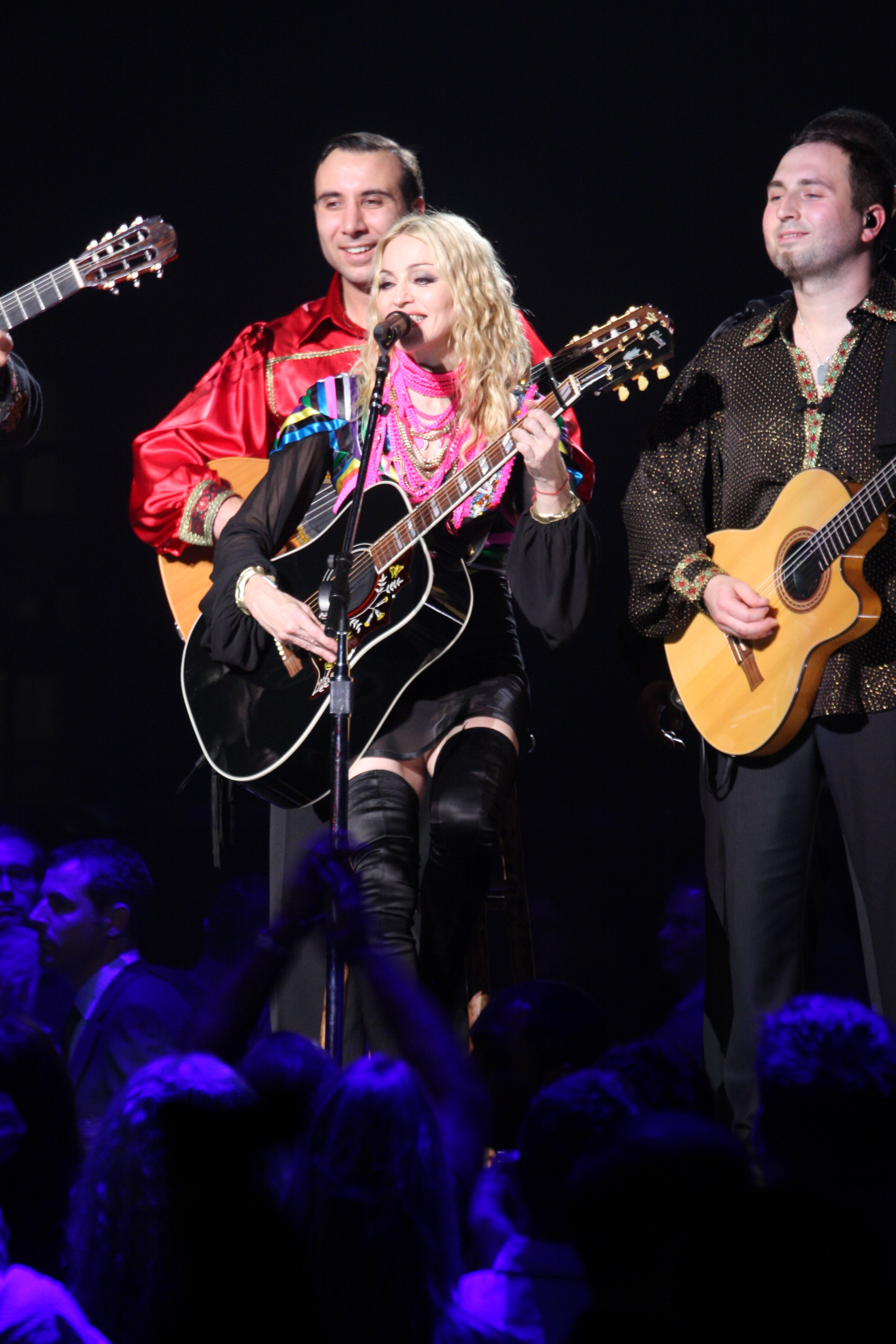
Madonna performing "You Must Love Me" during the Sticky & Sweet Tour (2008–09)

The music video for "You Must Love Me" was directed by Parker and features the singer performing the song inside a small room; interspersed with footage and scenes from Evita. As Madonna was eight months pregnant with her daughter Lourdes Maria, her stomach remained hidden behind a piano. The music video was included as a bonus feature on the 15th Anniversary Edition blu-ray of the film, released on June 19, 2012. On March 24, 1997, Madonna performed the song at the 69th Academy Awards dressed in a full-length, strapless Christian Dior gown. According to choreographer Otis Sallid, they wanted to portray the singer in a restrained manner, hence the accompaniment in the stage was just a spotlight on her and a piano to her left. Writing for The Philadelphia Inquirer, movie critic Carrie Rickey felt Madonna "gave a restrained performance of the number".

Madonna did not perform the song again until her Sticky & Sweet Tour (2008–2009). She appeared on stage wearing a black Givenchy dress, with pink colored ribbons around her neck and black stockings on her legs and performed an acoustic, guitar-driven version of the song sitting on a stool. She was backed by 4 musicians who were dressed in gypsy clothes. As she performed the song, scenes from Evita played on the backdrop screens. The performance received positive feedback from critics with Ricardo Baca, from The Denver Post, writing that "her courageous, late-set take on 'You Must Love Me' — from the filmed version of the Broadway musical Evita — was spot-on and gorgeous with its string accompaniment". On the Buenos Aires stop of the tour, after performing "You Must Love Me", Madonna also sang "Don't Cry for Me Argentina" from the film. The performances of both songs in the city were recorded in the live CD-DVD titled, Sticky & Sweet Tour (2010).

In 2007, singer Brooke White covered the song on the seventh season of American Idol. She initially forgot the lyrics to the song, so had to stop after the first verse to start over from the beginning. Lana Del Rey recorded a cover of "You Must Love Me" in 2018 for Lloyd Webber's greatest hits album Unmasked: The Platinum Collection. Del Rey commented: "Andrew Lloyd Webber has been one of my primary inspirations in music, so to do a cover of one of his songs is a dream. I especially love...'You Must Love Me', because of how unique the melody is. I've been incredibly inspired by all of Andrew's work from Phantom of the Opera to Evita."

== Track listing and formats ==
- US CD, cassette, and 7-inch single
1. "You Must Love Me" (single version) – 3:09
2. "Rainbow High" – 2:27
- European and UK CD single, digital download, streaming EP
1. "You Must Love Me" (single version) – 3:09
2. "Rainbow High" – 2:27
3. "You Must Love Me/I'd Be Surprisingly Good for You" (orchestral version) – 4:27

== Personnel ==
Personnel are adapted from the album's liner notes.

- Madonna – vocals, mixing
- Tim Rice – writer
- Andrew Lloyd Webber – writer, producer
- Alan Parker – producer
- Nigel Wright – producer
- David Reitzas – Robin Sellars mixing
- John Mauceri – conductor
- David Caddick and Mike Dixon – additional conductors

== Charts ==
=== Weekly charts ===
Chart (1996)	Peak position
Australia (ARIA)	11
Belgium (Ultratop 50 Flanders)	50
Canada (Nielsen SoundScan)	2
Canada Top Singles (RPM)	11
Canada Adult Contemporary (RPM)	2
Canada Contemporary Hit Radio (The Record)	24
Czech Republic (IFPI CR)	3
Europe (European Hot 100 Singles)	29
Finland (Suomen virallinen lista)	4
France (SNEP)	41
Germany (GfK)	78
Iceland (Íslenski Listinn Topp 40)	26
Ireland (IRMA)	21
Israel (Israeli Singles Chart)	5
Italy (Musica e dischi)	5
Italy Airplay (Music & Media)	3
Netherlands (Dutch Top 40 Tipparade)	4
Netherlands (Dutch Single Tip)	8
Scottish Singles Sales (Official Charts)	9
Sweden (Sverigetopplistan)	49
Switzerland (Schweizer Hitparade)	43
Taiwan (IFPI)	7
UK Singles (Official Charts)	10
US Billboard Hot 100	18
US Adult Contemporary (Billboard)	15
US Adult Pop Airplay (Billboard)	23
US Pop Airplay (Billboard)	23

=== Year-end charts ===
Chart (1996)	Position
Canada Adult Contemporary (RPM)	86
Israel (Israeli Singles Chart)	43

Chart (1997)	Position
Canada Adult Contemporary (RPM)	48
US Billboard Hot 100	99

== Certifications and sales ==
Region	Certification	Certified units/sales
Italy	—	20,000 (Note: Sales based in the first two days only.)
United Kingdom	—	90,428
United States (RIAA)	Gold	500,000^{^}
Summaries
Worldwide	—	1,100,000
^{^} Shipments figures based on certification alone.

== Bibliography ==
- Bona, Damien (2002). Inside Oscar 2. Random House Publishing Group. ISBN 978-0-345-44800-2.
- Citron, Stephen (2001). Stephen Sondheim and Andrew Lloyd Webber: The New Musical. Oxford University Press. ISBN 978-0-19-509601-9.
- Metz, Allen; Benson, Carol (1999), The Madonna Companion: Two Decades of Commentary, Music Sales Group, ISBN 0-8256-7194-9
- Michael, Mick St. (2004). Madonna 'Talking': Madonna in Her Own Words. Omnibus Press. ISBN 1-84449-418-7.
- Morton, Andrew (2002). Madonna. Macmillan Publishers. ISBN 0-312-98310-7.
- O'Brien, Lucy (2008). Madonna: Like an Icon. Bantam Press. ISBN 978-0-552-15361-4.
- Roberts, David (2006). British Hit Singles & Albums. Guinness World Records Limited. ISBN 1-904994-10-5.
- Rooksby, Rikky (2004). The Complete Guide to the Music of Madonna. Omnibus Press. ISBN 0-7119-9883-3.
- Taraborrelli, Randy J. (2008). Madonna: An Intimate Biography. Simon & Schuster. ISBN 978-0-330-45446-9.
