= Beat Goes On (Madonna song) =

2007 song by Madonna

Song by Madonna featuring Kanye West

from the album Hard Candy
- Released: April 18, 2008
- Recorded: 2007
- Studio: Sarm West, London; Record Plant, California
- Genre: Disco
- Length: 4:27
- Label: Warner Bros.
- Songwriters: Madonna; Pharrell Williams; Kanye West
- Producers: The Neptunes; Madonna

Audio video
- "Beat Goes On (feat. Kanye West)" on YouTube

"Beat Goes On" is a song recorded by American singer-songwriter Madonna for her eleventh studio album, Hard Candy (2008). The song features American rapper Kanye West and background vocals by Pharrell Williams. It was co-written by West in collaboration with its producers, Madonna and The Neptunes. The song was leaked in August 2007, featuring only Williams and different lyrics than the album's version, which was released a year later, having additional vocals by West. "Beat Goes On" is a disco song with hip-hop influences, featuring instrumentation from bells, handclaps and whistles.

Lyrically, "Beat Goes On" encourages people to say whatever they like and do whatever they feel. The song received generally favorable reviews from music critics, who commended the disco environment, while also praising Williams' production. However, some felt that the leaked version was better than the final version featuring West. "Beat Goes On" was certified platinum in Brazil for selling over 60,000 digital downloads. It also charted inside the top-twenty in Finland and on the Canadian Hot 100 chart. The song was performed live during the Sticky & Sweet Tour, featuring Madonna and her dancers on a 1935 Auburn Speedster, while Williams and West appeared in the video being displayed on backdrops.

== Background and composition ==
In early 2007, it was reported that Madonna was recording songs with American singer-songwriter Justin Timberlake for her upcoming album. Later, it was also announced that record producers Timbaland and Pharrell Williams were working with her on the album, and Timbaland confirmed that a song titled "Candy Shop" was being produced by Williams. A month later, a song called "The Beat Goes On", featuring Madonna's vocals and production by Williams, leaked online. The song started with Madonna saying, "Let's do something different, let's change things up," followed by DFA handclaps and cowbells, Bee Gees-like falsettos on the chorus and "Williams background interjections sprinkled throughout the track," as noted by Maura Johnson from Idolator. During the pre-chorus Madonna sings the line, "Always a bridesmaid, never the bride", followed by "I'll throw you some rope, if it'll give you hope." In December 2007, it was announced that a new version of the song was being developed with American rapper Kanye West as featured guest.

"Beat Goes On" was re-recorded in October 2007 by Spike Spent, Andrew Coleman and Alex Dromgoole at Sarm Studios, London, and at the Record Plant Studios, California. Spent and Coleman also mixed the track at the Record Plant. Williams' production team, The Neptunes, produced the track, with Madonna. The song was written by Madonna and Williams, with rap vocals by West, and the title is a reference to The Whispers' disco track "And the Beat Goes On" (1980). "Beat Goes On" is a disco song, with funk and hip-hop influences, drum beat and bell chimes, as well as Williams' shimmering, thumping production, which according to Bradley Stern from Idolator, "offers Madonna the perfect groove to wax bombastic about the cathartic pleasures of dancing." Lyrically, "Beat Goes On" is a song about the freedom to dance, where people are urged to say whatever they like and do whatever they feel.

== Reception ==
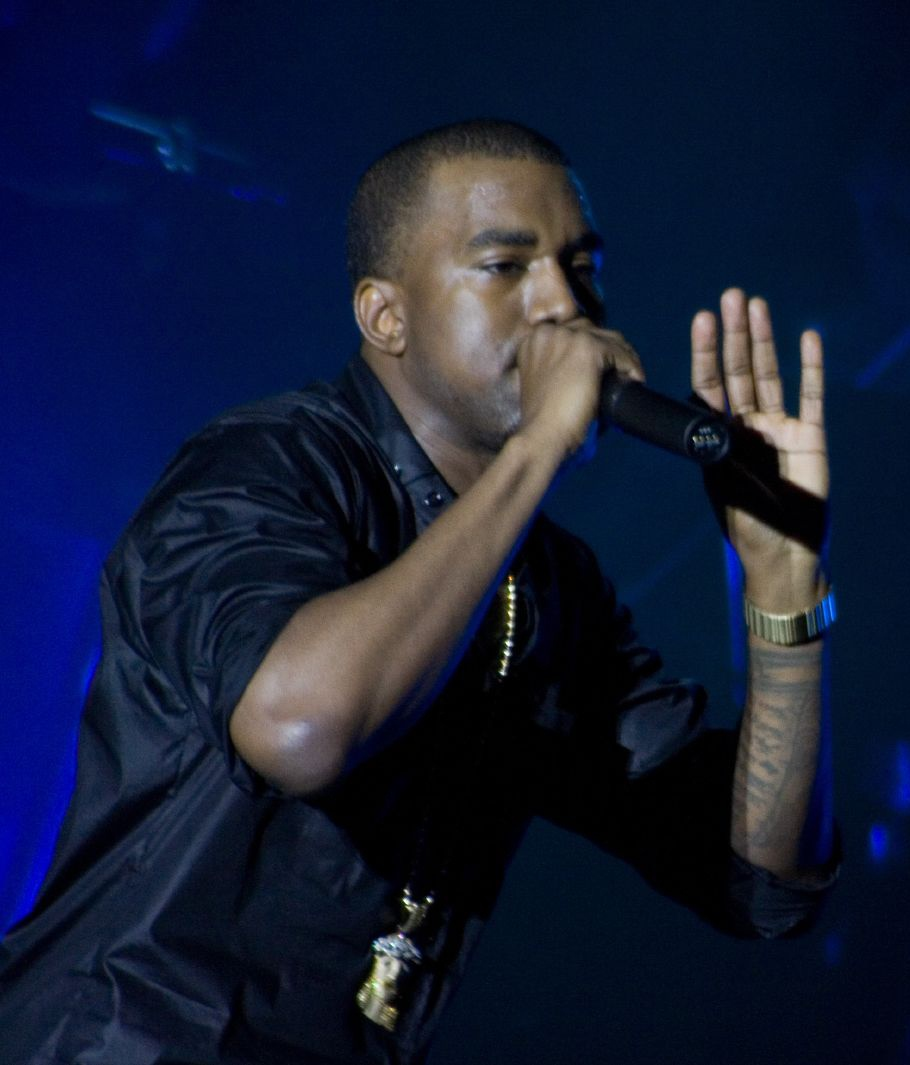
Kanye West's appearance on the track was criticized.

"Beat Goes On" received generally mixed to positive reviews from music critics. Caryn Ganz of Rolling Stone felt that the usage of bells and whistles as instrumentation, along with the disco sounds made the track connect to two of Madonna's inspirations, that of Chic, and Donna Summer. Ganz went on to criticize West's appearance, calling it "uninspired". In a similar review, Thomas Hauner of PopMatters wrote that the song "continues the Donna Summer touch, this time opting for 'beep beep' vocals on a surprisingly sweet track." Sal Cinquemani of Slant Magazine praised the song's "flattering sonic facelift", feeling that it "transports [the track] from 2001 to 1979". Talia Soghomolian of musicOMH praised "the variations in its tempo", making it "the perfect dance floor tune, merging old school and modern takes on urbanity."

Miles Marshall Lewis of The Village Voice was not favourable to West's verses, calling them as "playfully tepid lines", while a reviewer from Blender panned his contributions. Jaime Gill of Yahoo! Music echoed the same thought, calling West's rap as "awful" and his addition to the track as redundant. Joan Anderman of The Boston Globe was mixed in his review of the song, praising Madonna's endeavors in "Beat Goes On" while questioning West's appearance in it. Conversely, Tony Robert Whyte of Drowned in Sound called him "a decent guest". Allan Raible of ABC News summarized the track as a "standard disco number". He complimented Madonna's vocals but added that the song felt rejuvenated with the addition of West's vocals.

"Beat Goes On" was certified platinum by the Associação Brasileira dos Produtores de Discos, for exceeding 60,000 digital downloads. In Finland, the song debuted and peaked at number 15 in August 2009. In Canada, the song also made its debut, peaking at number 82 on the Canadian Hot 100 chart. In the US, the song made an entry on the Billboard Pop 100 (now discontinued) chart for a week, at number 97.

== Live performance ==
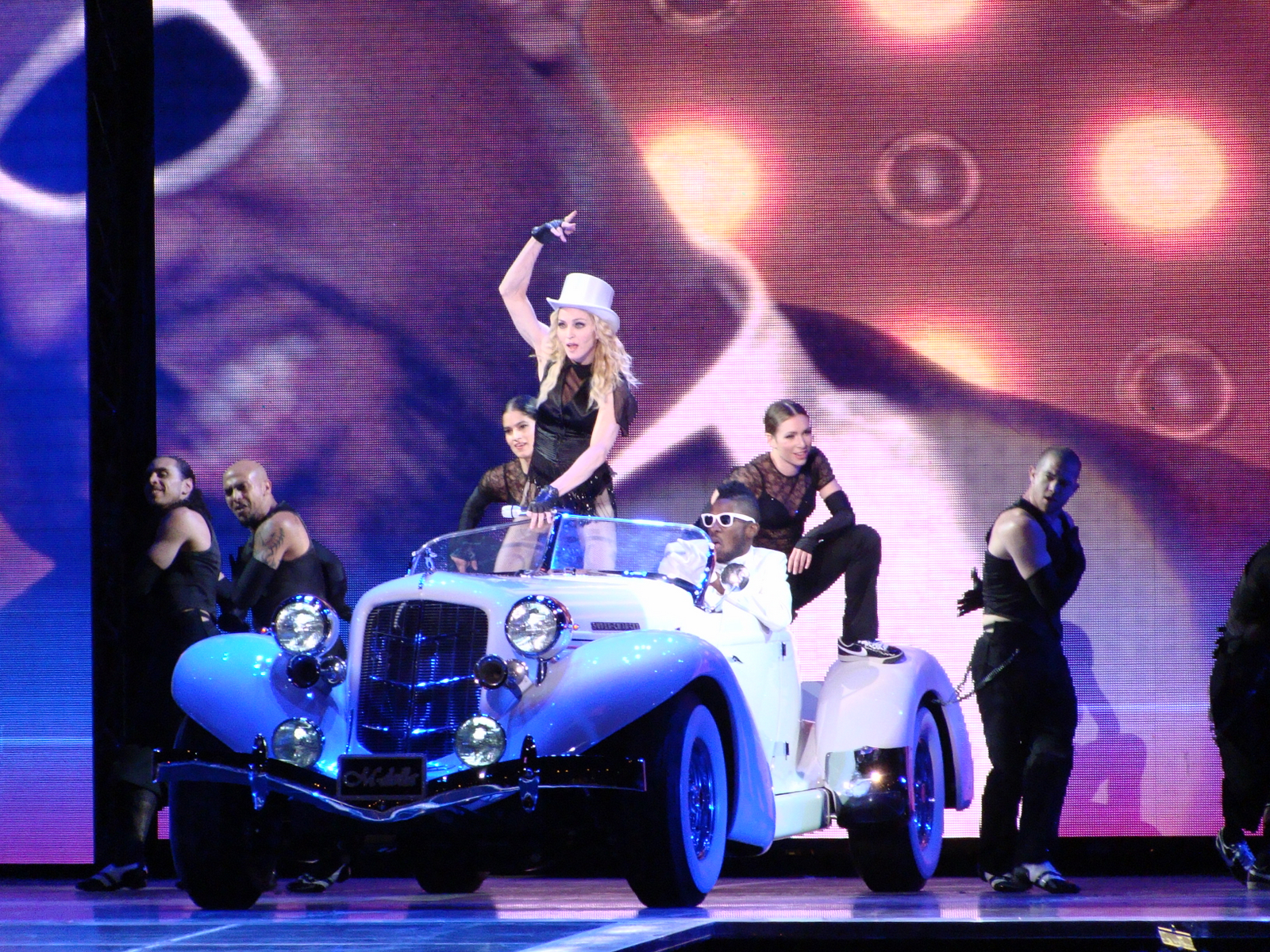
Madonna riding a Speedster, during the performance of "Beat Goes On" on the Sticky & Sweet Tour

"Beat Goes On" was performed during the Sticky & Sweet Tour (2008–09) as the second song of the opening segment, "Pimp". After descending the throne during the first song, "Candy Shop", Madonna and her dancers are featured on a 1935 Auburn Speedster to the performance of the song. Both Williams and West appeared in the videos being displayed on the backdrops. Sarah Liss of CBC News called the performance "pulsating," noting that "her studio collaborators—Pharrell Williams and Kanye West—present in spirit and countenance (their virtual likenesses grimaced from those massive screens) if not in body." Michael Roffman of Consequence of Sound praised the performance, writing that "by the second song, 'Beat Goes On', it was clear that this was going to be one hell of an innovative show." Roffman also pointed out that "a digital Kanye West joined Madonna on stage, rapping along as the singer flipped and bounced on the floor." During a Chicago concert, Paul Schrodt of Slant Magazine wrote that "a song about the freedom to dance ("Beat Goes On") becomes an anthem for political frustration, and it's the only moment that's generated any real controversy, but she doesn't say anything about either the Republican or the Democratic candidate that she hasn't said before. The power of any great Madonna song is implicit: 'Say what you like/Do what you feel/You know exactly who you are'." The live performance of the song at River Plate Stadium of Buenos Aires, Argentina, was recorded and released on the live CD-DVD album, Sticky & Sweet Tour (2010).

== Personnel ==
Credits and personnel adapted from Hard Candy album liner notes.

- Madonna – songwriter, lead vocals, producer
- Pharrell Williams – songwriter, background vocals, producer
- Kanye West – songwriter, featured vocals
- Chad Hugo – producer
- Spike Spent – mixing, recording
- Andrew Coleman – mixing, recording
- Alex Dromgoole – recording

== Charts and certifications ==
=== Weekly charts ===
Chart (2008–2009)	Peak position
Canada Hot 100 (Billboard)	82
Finland (Suomen virallinen lista)	15
Greece Digital Songs (Billboard)	7
Russia Airplay (TopHit)	34
UK Singles (Official Charts Company)	189
US Pop 100 (Billboard)	97

=== Year-end charts ===
Chart (2009)	Position
CIS (Tophit)	131
Russia Airplay (TopHit)	156

=== Certifications ===
Region	Certification	Certified units/sales
Brazil (Pro-Música Brasil)	Platinum	60,000^{*}
^{*} Sales figures based on certification alone.
