= Hamutsun Serve =

The Hamutsun Serve (はむつんサーブ) is a Japanese dance unit made up of 2 members, Rikiccho and Dah-yoshi.

Formed in 1999 by students of Fukushima University, they gained reputation as performers of 'Animation Dance' through TV appearances in Japan. They have appeared in "4 Minutes" video, as Madonna had previously noticed their performance on YouTube. Most recently, Rikiccho and Dah-Yoshi have collaborated with Madonna for her 2008 Sticky & Sweet Tour: they made appearances during the "Rain" interlude (which was mashed with the Eurythmics' "Here Comes The Rain Again"), "Devil Wouldn't Recognize You", "Ray of Light" and briefly during the bridge of "Hung Up".
