= List of Billboard number-one dance singles of 2008 =

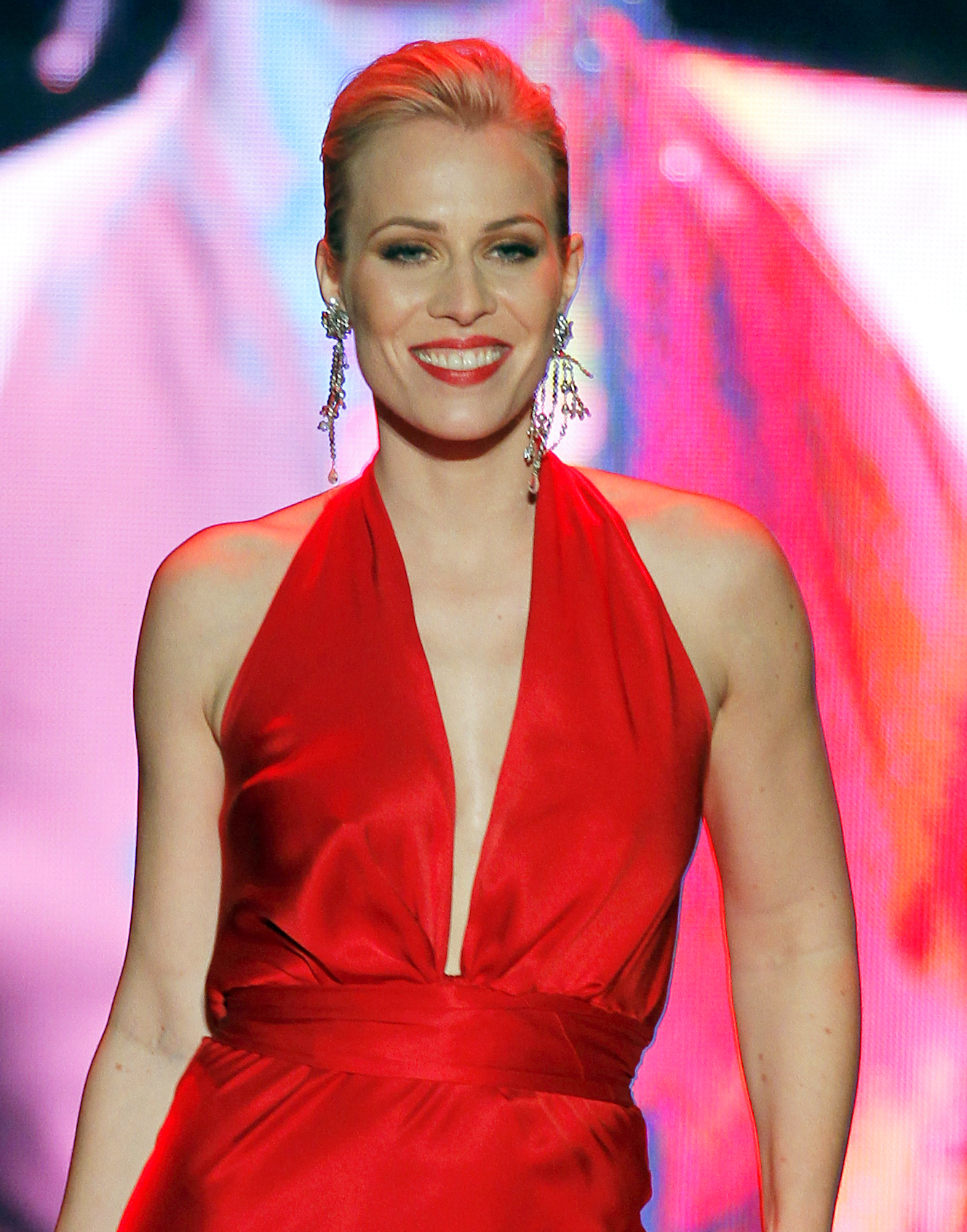
Natasha Bedingfield earned three dance number ones in 2008, including "Pocketful of Sunshine" which topped both the club chart and the airplay chart.

Billboard magazine compiled the top-performing dance singles in the United States during 2008 on the Hot Dance Club Play, the Hot Dance Singles Sales, and the Hot Dance Airplay. Premiered in 1976, the Hot Dance Club Play chart ranked the most-played singles on dance club based on reports from a national sample of club DJs. The Hot Dance Singles Sales chart was launched in 1985 to compile the best-selling dance singles based on retail sales across the United States. The Hot Dance Airplay was first published in 2003, ranking the singles based on airplay detections on dance radio.

The first club play number-one song of the year was Dave Gahan's "Kingdom", and it ranked at number 10 on the 2008 Dance Club Play year-end chart. Artists to achieve one number one song on the chart throughout the course of 2008 were Celine Dion with "Taking Chances" which ranked at number 30 on the 2008 year-end list, Mary J. Blige with "Just Fine" which ranked at number 45 on the 2008 year-end list, Mariah Carey with "Touch My Body", and Rihanna with "Disturbia". Bob Sinclar and Steve Edwards topped the chart with "Together", which claimed the number one position on the 2008 year-end chart as the most performed song in dance clubs.

Multiple artists achieved two number-one dance singles throughout the course of 2008. Kimberley Locke topped the chart with "Band of Gold" and "Fall". The former ranked at number 11 on the 2008 year-end chart, while the latter ranked at number 39. Britney Spears achieved two number ones on the chart with "Piece of Me" and "Break the Ice". "Piece of Me" ranked at number 37 on the 2008 year-end chart, while "Break the Ice" ranked at number 42. Madonna and Donna Summer both topped the chart with two songs, and were the only artists in 2008 to have one song each peak at number one for two consecutive weeks. Madonna claimed the number one position twice with the songs "4 Minutes", featuring Justin Timberlake, which spent two consecutive weeks atop the chart, and with "Give It 2 Me". Summer's "Stamp Your Feet" also topped the chart for two consecutive weeks, and with "I'm a Fire". Other artists earning two number ones during 2008 are Yoko Ono, Cyndi Lauper, Erin Hamilton, Moby, and Solange. Natasha Bedingfield earned the most number-ones during 2008, with three: "Love like This", "Pocketful of Sunshine" and "Angel".

== Charts history ==
Chart history
Issue date	Hot Dance Club Play		Hot Dance Singles Sales		Hot Dance Airplay		Ref.
Issue date	Song	Artist(s)	Song	Artist(s)	Song	Artist(s)	Ref.
January 5	"Kingdom"	Dave Gahan	"Cuntry Boner"	Puscifer	"Amazing"	Seal	
January 12	"No, No, No"	Ono	"Straight To Video"	Mindless Self Indulgence	"In My Arms"	Plumb	
January 19	"Band of Gold"	Kimberley Locke	"Cuntry Boner"	Puscifer	"In My Arms"	Plumb	
January 26	"Stars"	Erika Jayne	"Cuntry Boner"	Puscifer	"Calabria 2007"	Enur featuring Natasja	
February 2	"Taking Chances"	Celine Dion	"Cuntry Boner"	Puscifer	"What Hurts the Most"	Cascada	
February 9	"Love like This"	Natasha Bedingfield featuring Sean Kingston	"Cuntry Boner"	Puscifer	"Let Me Think About It"	Ida Corr	
February 16	"Just Fine"	Mary J. Blige	"Cuntry Boner"	Puscifer	"Anthem"	Filo & Peri featuring Eric Lumiere	
February 23	"Give It All You Got"	Ultra Naté featuring Chris Willis	"Every Day Is Exactly The Same"	Nine Inch Nails	"Let Me Think About It"	Ida Corr vs. Fedde LeGrande	
March 1	"Amazing"	Celeda	"A&E"	Goldfrapp	"Let Me Think About It"	Ida Corr vs. Fedde LeGrande	
March 8	"Piece of Me"	Britney Spears	"It's Right Here"	Tanika Turner	"Let Me Think About It"	Ida Corr vs. Fedde LeGrande	
March 15	"Together"	Bob Sinclar and Steve Edwards	"A&E"	Goldfrapp	"Let Me Think About It"	Ida Corr vs. Fedde LeGrande	
March 22	"Feedback"	Janet	"It's Right Here"	Tanika Turner	"Let Me Think About It"	Ida Corr vs. Fedde LeGrande	
March 29	"The Boss"	Kristine W	"Paper Planes"	M.I.A.	"Stars"	Erika Jayne	
April 5	"Beautiful"	Taylor Dayne	"Never Wanted To Dance"	Mindless Self Indulgence	"I Can't Help Myself"	Bellatrax featuring Sophia May	
April 12	"The Flame 08"	Erin Hamilton	"Never Wanted To Dance"	Mindless Self Indulgence	"I Can't Help Myself"	Bellatrax featuring Sophia May	
April 19	"I'm a Fire"	Donna Summer	"Never Wanted To Dance"	Mindless Self Indulgence	"I Can't Help Myself"	Bellatrax featuring Sophia May	
April 26	"Sensual Seduction"	Snoop Dogg	"Don't You Evah"	Spoon	"Now You're Gone"	Basshunter featuring DJ Mental Theo's Bazzheads	
May 3	"Break You"	Ralph Falcon featuring The Weather Girls	"It's Right Here"	Tanika Turner	"Now You're Gone"	Basshunter featuring DJ Mental Theo's Bazzheads	
May 10	"Touch My Body"	Mariah Carey	"Never Wanted To Dance"	Mindless Self Indulgence	"Bleeding Love"	Leona Lewis	
May 17	"4 Minutes"	Madonna featuring Justin Timberlake	"4 Minutes"	Madonna featuring Justin Timberlake	"Bleeding Love"	Leona Lewis	
May 24	"4 Minutes"	Madonna featuring Justin Timberlake	"Water Curses"	Animal Collective	"Bleeding Love"	Leona Lewis	
May 31	"Pocketful of Sunshine"	Natasha Bedingfield	"4 Minutes"	Madonna featuring Justin Timberlake	"Bleeding Love"	Leona Lewis	
June 7	"Break the Ice"	Britney Spears	"4 Minutes"	Madonna featuring Justin Timberlake	"4 Minutes"	Madonna featuring Justin Timberlake	
June 14	"Leavin'"	Jesse McCartney	"Ur So Gay"	Katy Perry	"Pocketful of Sunshine"	Natasha Bedingfield	
June 21	"Disco Lies"	Moby	"Ur So Gay"	Katy Perry	"Pocketful of Sunshine"	Natasha Bedingfield	
June 28	"Same Ol' Story"	Cyndi Lauper	"Ur So Gay"	Katy Perry	"Bleeding Love"	Leona Lewis	
July 5	"Stamp Your Feet"	Donna Summer	"I Decided"	Solange	"Pocketful of Sunshine"	Natasha Bedingfield	
July 12	"Stamp Your Feet"	Donna Summer	"I Decided"	Solange	"Give It 2 Me"	Madonna	
July 19	"Turn It Up"	Mark Picchiotti presents Basstoy	"I Decided"	Solange	"We Break the Dawn"	Michelle Williams featuring Flo Rida	
July 26	"Fall"	Kimberley Locke	"Pay For It"	Mindless Self Indulgence	"I Kissed a Girl"	Katy Perry	
August 2	"When I Grow Up"	Pussycat Dolls	"I Decided"	Solange	"I Kissed a Girl"	Katy Perry	
August 9	"Give It 2 Me"	Madonna	"I Decided"	Solange	"I Kissed a Girl"	Katy Perry	
August 16	"Give Peace a Chance"	Ono	"I Decided"	Solange	"I Kissed a Girl"	Katy Perry	
August 23	"I Decided"	Solange	"Give It 2 Me"	Madonna	"I Kissed a Girl"	Katy Perry	
August 30	"Into the Nightlife"	Cyndi Lauper	"Give It 2 Me"	Madonna	"Closer"	Ne-Yo	
September 6	"Closer"	Ne-Yo	"I Decided"	Solange	"Move for Me"	Kaskade and Deadmau5	
September 13	"Disturbia"	Rihanna	"Give It 2 Me"	Madonna	"Disturbia"	Rihanna	
September 20	"Control Yourself"	Erin Hamilton	"Paper Planes"	M.I.A.	"Disturbia"	Rihanna	
September 27	"Shut Up and Let Me Go"	The Ting Tings	"Paper Planes"	M.I.A.	"Disturbia"	Rihanna	
October 4	"I Love to Move in Here"	Moby	"Paper Planes"	M.I.A.	"Disturbia"	Rihanna	
October 11	"Angel"	Natasha Bedingfield	"The Dull Flame Of Desire"	Bjork	"Disturbia"	Rihanna	
October 18	"And I Try"	Bimbo Jones	"I Kissed A Girl"	Katy Perry	"Disturbia"	Rihanna	
October 25	"Bossy"	Lindsay Lohan	"Paper Planes"	M.I.A.	"You Make Me Feel"	Annagrace	
November 1	"Can You Feel That Sound"	Georgie Porgie	"Got Friends"	Jealous Sound	"Move for Me"	Kaskade and Deadmau5	
November 8	"The Space Dance"	Danny Tenaglia	"Paper Planes"	M.I.A.	"Every Word"	Ercola and Daniella	
November 15	"Get Up"	Mary Mary	"Paper Planes"	M.I.A.	"Every Word"	Ercola and Daniella	
November 22	"Don't Call Me Baby"	Kreesha Turner	"Just Dance"	Lady Gaga Featuring Colby O'Donis	"Feel Your Love"	Kim Sozzi	
November 29	"Grass Is Greener"	Dave Audé featuring Sisely Treasure	"She Loves Everybody"	Chester French	"Every Word"	Ercola and Daniella	
December 6	"Reach Out"	Hilary Duff	"Just Dance"	Lady Gaga Featuring Colby O'Donis	"So What"	Pink	
December 13	"Right Here (Departed)"	Brandy	"Hot N Cold"	Katy Perry	"Behind"	Flanders	
December 20	"Sandcastle Disco"	Solange	"Hot N Cold"	Katy Perry	"Behind"	Flanders	
December 27	"The Greatest"	Michelle Williams	"Human"	The Killers	"Miles Away"	Madonna	

== See also ==
- 2008 in American music
- List of Billboard Hot 100 number ones of 2008
