= I Can't Help Myself =

I Can't Help Myself may refer to:

- "I Can't Help Myself (Sugar Pie Honey Bunch)", a 1965 song by Four Tops
- "I Can't Help Myself" (Eddie Rabbitt song), 1977
- "I Can't Help Myself" (Bellatrax song), 2008
- I Can't Help Myself (The Kelly Family song), 1996
- "I Can't Help Myself", a 1995 song by Moloko from the album Do You Like My Tight Sweater?
- "I Can't Help Myself", a 1982 song by Orange Juice from the album Rip It Up (Orange Juice album)
- "Can't Help Myself", a robotic arm art piece by Sun Yuan & Peng Yu

== See also ==
- Can't Help Myself (disambiguation)
