= Can't Help Myself =

Can't Help Myself may refer to:

- "Can't Help Myself" (Flowers song), 1980
- "Can't Help Myself", a song by Destiny's Child from the 1999 album The Writing's on the Wall
- "Can't Help Myself", a 2007 single by Kaci Battaglia
- "Can't Help Myself" (Dean Brody and The Reklaws song), 2020
- "Can't Help Myself", a 2020 song by Kita Alexander
- "Can't Help Myself" (Sun Yuan and Peng Yu), an art piece, 2016

== See also ==
- I Can't Help Myself (disambiguation)
- Aadat Se Majboor (disambiguation)
