= Rear =

Rear may refer to:

== Animals ==
- Rear (horse), when a horse lifts its front legs off the ground
- In stockbreeding, to breed and raise

== Humans ==
- Parenting (child rearing), the process of promoting and supporting a child from infancy to adulthood
- Gender of rearing, the gender in which parents rear a child

== Military ==
- Rear (military), the area of a battlefield behind the front line
- Rear admiral, a naval officer

== See also ==
- Rear end (disambiguation)
- Behind (disambiguation)
- Hind (disambiguation)
