= Got Friends =

Album by The Jealous Sound

EP by The Jealous Sound
- Released: October 14, 2008
- Genre: Indie rock
- Label: The Militia Group

The Jealous Sound chronology
Kill Them with Kindness (2003)	Got Friends (2008)	A Gentle Reminder (2012)

Professional ratings
Review scores
Source	Rating
AbsolutePunk.net	(84%) link
Allmusic	link

Got Friends is the second EP from indie rock band The Jealous Sound, digitally released on October 14, 2008. There has not yet been a physical release.

According to a blog post on The Village Voice's website, The Jealous Sound broke up in 2005, and the songs on the Got Friends EP are "the last shreds of material recorded before lead singer Blair Shehan went crazy and more or less disappeared."

== Track listing ==
1. "Got Friends" - 3:24
2. "Turning Around" - 3:59
3. "Broad Shoulders" - 5:01
4. "Got Friends" (Figurine Remix) - 4:13
5. "Got Friends" (J. McGinnis Remix) - 4:24
