= Dogs That Cannot Touch Each Other =

2003 art installation by Sun Yuan & Peng Yu

Dogs That Cannot Touch Each Other is an art installation created by Chinese artists Sun Yuan & Peng Yu in 2003. The installation consists of a series of enclosed treadmills, each with a pair of American Pit Bull Terriers placed facing each other. The treadmills are turned on, causing the dogs to run towards each other but never allowing them to make physical contact due to the transparent barriers.

The piece sparked significant debate and criticism regarding animal cruelty and ethical treatment of animals in the name of art. As a result, the exhibition was cancelled in several locations, most notably the Guggenheim Museum.

== Installation ==
The art installation comprises eight enclosed, non-motorised treadmills, each with an American Pit Bull Terrier obtained from a provincial breeding and training institute for fighting dogs. The dogs were brought to the Beijing art space in separate limousines, with human trainers ensuring their separation due to territorial and aggressive tendencies. The dogs are positioned facing each other and harnessed in place before the treadmills are activated. The dogs unsuccessfully attempt to run towards each other, exhausting themselves in the process. The performance is structured into three seven-minute segments, alternating between running and rest, aiming to emulate human athletic competition and establish an equivalence between human and animal sports.

The preparation of the dogs for the running was described as integral to the overall spectacle of Dogs That Cannot Touch Each Other. In the intermission, human trainers took meticulous care of the dogs, providing water and massaging them to relax their muscles, treating the dogs with the same level of attention as star athletes, as explained by scholar Meiling Cheng. According to Yu, the dogs were examined by veterinarians before and after the performance. The primary objective was to establish an equivalence between human and animal sports by employing dogs specifically bred for aggression, using them as a prop to comment on human savagery. Cheng notes that the machines used in the performance were deemed highly effective for training fighting dogs, with the dogs' regular coach going on to purchase four treadmills from the artists after the conclusion of the show.

== Criticism ==
The installation has faced disapproval and condemnation from art critics and animal welfare advocates. Animal rights groups expressed strong disapproval of the installation. PETA President Ingrid Newkirk wrote that "the animals in these exhibits are not willing participants, and no one should force sentient beings into stressful situations for 'art' or 'sport.'" The American Society for the Prevention of Cruelty to Animals (ASPCA) declared that “the ASPCA fully supports artistic expression, but strongly oppose any use of animals in art or entertainment if it results in pain or distress to the animals, which is clearly the case in this video." The American Kennel Club stated that dogfighting “should not be displayed in any manner and certainly not as art.”

In an interview with Paul Gladston, Sun responded to allegations of abuse by saying:

Were the dogs being abused? The answer should be no. These dogs are naturally pugnacious. We only separated them and let them run on the treadmill, which became a sport for the dogs. For those who consider this animal abuse, I don’t understand what they are protesting about. In fact, human nature and animal nature are the same. China hosted the Olympic Games in Beijing in 2008. What is the goal of this type of sporting event? Actually, it is a conversion of actual fighting into regulated competition. It’s agreeable to most people because most people are supportive of the convention of the Olympic Games.

== Guggenheim controversy ==
The installation stirred a significant controversy at the Guggenheim Museum, ignited by The New York Times' September 20, 2017 article, "Where the Wild Things Are: China’s Art Dreams at the Guggenheim." The article, previewing the upcoming exhibition "Art and China after 1989: Theater of the World," which contained about 150 works, expressed concerns about a seven-minute video of the original installation of Dogs That Cannot Touch Each Other staged at a Beijing museum in 2003, sparking a swift public reaction. Critics and animal-rights supporters labelled it as animal abuse and began circulating petitions and social media campaigns urging for it to be removed, as well as for the removal of two other works involving animals. In a letter to the Guggenheim, PETA wrote that “people who find entertainment in watching animals try to fight each other are sick individuals whose twisted whims the Guggenheim should refuse to cater to." Protesters demonstrated outside the Guggenheim and a Change.org petition calling for the removal of the works in the exhibition garnered signatures from nearly 600,000 people before the removal of the works was announced.

Responding to the controversy, the Guggenheim released a statement on 21 September, acknowledging concerns and characterising the artwork as "intentionally challenging and provocative," aiming to examine systems of power and control. The statement urged viewers to "consider why the artists produced it and what they may be saying about the social conditions of globalisation and the complex nature of the world we share."

As the controversy intensified, the museum, in an uncommon move, removed three works, including Dogs That Cannot Touch Each Other, from the exhibition on 25 September. The two other works removed were Theater of the World by Huang Yong Ping, a structure with insects and lizards that may eat each other under warming lamps, and A Case Study of Transference by Xu Bing, a video featuring pigs stamped with characters copulating in front of a live audience. The decision was attributed to "explicit and repeated threats of violence" and concerns for the safety of staff, visitors, and participating artists. While expressing dismay at withholding artworks, the museum emphasised that "freedom of expression has always been and will remain a paramount value of the Guggenheim."

Before the criticism started, curator Alexandra Munroe, who organised the exhibition, discussed the anticipated pushback in an interview with Artnet News' Andrew Goldstein. Munroe acknowledged the challenging reception of "Theater of the World" since its 1993 premiere. Despite the historical difficulties, she mentioned the Guggenheim's decision to showcase the work, emphasising its role in introducing visitors to a visceral realism present in other significant pieces within the exhibition.

=== Reception of the museum's removal of the video ===
The Guggenheim's communication about the artwork's context was criticised for its vagueness, particularly as the exhibition aimed to showcase less-known Chinese conceptual art in the United States. The controversy highlighted broader issues about how museums navigate and present challenging material in the contemporary socio-political landscape. Several artists criticised the Guggenheim for withdrawing the controversial artworks, expressing worries about potential threats to artistic expression and free speech. In a CNN opinion piece, art critic J.J. Charlesworth observed that the Guggenheim's invocation of freedom of expression appeared feeble at best and noted that critics of the exhibition displayed little regard for the principle of free speech, with few showing enthusiasm to support the museum's defence. He highlighted that freedom of expression became negotiable when it challenges the values cherished by protestors. Chinese conceptual artist and activist Ai Weiwei, frequently subject to Chinese government censorship, expressed his viewpoint by stating "when an art institution cannot exercise its right for freedom of speech, that is tragic for a modern society." He also noted that pressuring museums to remove certain works "shows a narrow understanding about not only animal rights but also human rights."

Writing for ARTnews, Ben Davis argues that the criticism of the video, which he refers to as a "historical document of an event that took place 14 years ago," should be viewed in the context of a broader historical and cultural perspective. While acknowledging the potential repugnance of the treatment of animals in the video, Davis contends that "the treatment of animals in it is representative of an actual, pronounced strand of Chinese artistic practice, one that was historically important and needs to be understood." He introduces scholar Meiling Cheng's perspective, emphasising the caution needed when applying Euro-American values to China due to radical socioeconomic differences. Davis highlights the evolving attitudes towards animal welfare in China, particularly in urban areas, and places the controversial artwork within the significant rural-to-urban transformations during the exhibition's time frame, noting the cultural shifts that influenced recent Chinese art's focus on animal-based work.

Gary L. Comstock, a philosophy professor at North Carolina State University and a board member of the Culture & Animals Foundation, argues that the Guggenheim's decision to remove the controversial works represents an "unusual conflation of human and animal rights". He specifically objects to the removal of the footage of Dogs That Cannot Touch Each Other, stating that while it captures morally questionable behaviour, it does not justify suppression, as the harm inflicted on the dogs was not extreme or fatal, and there is no evidence of ongoing harm by the artists. Comstock contends that the video of the performance serves as a valuable historical record that sparks conversations about the human-animal bond and cultural differences in the treatment of companion animals and that the video does not harm viewers or the dogs further, as the harm has already occurred. While he deems it "bad art" based on aesthetic judgement, he emphasises that this is not a moral assessment. Comstock also suggests that the artists might have questionable intentions, and he condemns any future attempts to subject sentient animals to similar treatment.

Art history professor Stephen F. Eisenman, in a piece for ARTnews, dismissed the notion that freedom of expression was relevant to the controversy. He expressed outrage at a well-regarded institution showcasing videotapes of artworks that feature "animal use, abuse, and torture.” Jessica Scott-Reid, writing for New York Daily News, rebuked the perceived privilege of art and artists. While acknowledging the art world's distinct realm, she emphasised that "art is still expected to abide by the law, if not of the land then of humanity.”

Best Friends Animal Society criticised the Guggenheim for neglecting the inherent cruelty in the showcased piece and removing it solely due to safety concerns, without addressing the cruelty in its creation or display. They assert that the exhibit constitutes plain animal abuse, highlighting the dogs' lack of consent and denouncing Sun's justifications. They question the ethical implications of presenting such work, drawing parallels to scenarios involving human subjects, and encourage readers to voice their objections to the Guggenheim curator, Alexandra Munroe, whom they label as "out-of-touch."

== See also ==
- Helena, artwork
- Can't Help Myself, by Sun Yuan and Peng Yu
