= Michael Moog =

American musician, record producer and remixer

Michael Moog is a moniker for producer/arranger/remixer Phillip Damien Gaines from New York City.

He scored a No. 1 hit on the Billboard Hot Dance Music/Club Play chart in 2000 with "That Sound," which sampled The Spinners' "I'll Be Around". "That Sound" also reached No. 32 in the UK Singles Chart.

In 2001, Moog was injured in a car accident. But after months of rehabilation he returned to dancefloors in 2002 with "R U Ready."

"That Sound" was sampled in Flanders' 2006 single "By My Side."

== See also ==
- List of number-one dance hits (United States)
- List of artists who reached number one on the US Dance chart
