= Rear end =

Rear end may refer to:

- Buttocks, euphemistically
- Rear-end collision, a type of road collision
- An automobile's rear differential, colloquially
- Rear End, a 1999 album by Mercedes

== See also ==
- Rear (disambiguation)
