= List of number-one digital songs of 2008 (U.S.) =

2008 highest-selling digital singles in the United States

The highest-selling digital singles in the United States are ranked in the Hot Digital Songs chart, published by Billboard magazine. The data are compiled by Nielsen SoundScan based on each single's weekly digital sales, which combines sales of different versions of a single for a summarized figure.

== Chart history ==
Key
†	Indicates best-charting digital song of 2008

Issue date	Song	Artist(s)	Weekly sales	Ref(s)
January 5	"Low" †	Flo Rida featuring T-Pain	178,000	
January 12	"Low" †	Flo Rida featuring T-Pain	467,000	
January 19	"Low" †	Flo Rida featuring T-Pain	232,000	
January 26	"Low" †	Flo Rida featuring T-Pain		
February 2	"Low" †	Flo Rida featuring T-Pain	180,000	
February 9	"Low" †	Flo Rida featuring T-Pain	170,000	
February 16	"Low" †	Flo Rida featuring T-Pain	179,000	
February 23	"Low" †	Flo Rida featuring T-Pain	167,000	
March 1	"Low" †	Flo Rida featuring T-Pain		
March 8	"Low" †	Flo Rida featuring T-Pain		
March 15	"Love in This Club"	Usher featuring Young Jeezy	198,000	
March 22	"Hallelujah"	Jeff Buckley	178,000	
March 29	"Love in This Club"	Usher featuring Young Jeezy		
April 5	"Bleeding Love"	Leona Lewis	219,000	
April 12	"Touch My Body"	Mariah Carey	286,000	
April 19	"4 Minutes"	Madonna featuring Justin Timberlake	217,000	
April 26	"Bleeding Love"	Leona Lewis	223,000	
May 3	"4 Minutes"	Madonna featuring Justin Timberlake	202,000	
May 10	"Bleeding Love"	Leona Lewis	236,000	
May 17	"Bleeding Love"	Leona Lewis	217,000	
May 24	"Take a Bow"	Rihanna	267,000	
May 31	"Take a Bow"	Rihanna	196,000	
June 7	"The Time of My Life"	David Cook	236,000	
June 14	"Viva la Vida"	Coldplay	219,000	
June 21	"Viva la Vida"	Coldplay	253,000	
June 28	"Viva la Vida"	Coldplay	246,000	
July 5	"I Kissed a Girl"	Katy Perry	235,000	
July 12	"I Kissed a Girl"	Katy Perry	206,000	
July 19	"I Kissed a Girl"	Katy Perry	191,000	
July 26	"I Kissed a Girl"	Katy Perry	177,000	
August 2	"I Kissed a Girl"	Katy Perry	166,000	
August 9	"I Kissed a Girl"	Katy Perry	151,000	
August 16	"Disturbia"	Rihanna	140,000	
August 23	"Disturbia"	Rihanna	148,000	
August 30	"Crush"	David Archuleta	166,000	
September 6	"Whatever You Like"	T.I.	205,000	
September 13	"Whatever You Like"	T.I.	176,000	
September 20	"So What"	Pink	197,000	
September 27	"So What"	Pink	253,000	
October 4	"So What"	Pink	218,000	
October 11	"Whatever You Like"	T.I.		
October 18	"Live Your Life"	T.I. featuring Rihanna	335,000	
October 25	"Womanizer"	Britney Spears	286,000	
November 1	"Womanizer"	Britney Spears	201,000	
November 8	"If I Were a Boy"	Beyoncé	190,000	
November 15	"Live Your Life"	T.I. featuring Rihanna	184,000	
November 22	"Heartless"	Kanye West	201,000	
November 29	"If I Were a Boy"	Beyoncé	170,000	
December 6	"Single Ladies (Put a Ring on It)"	Beyoncé	204,000	
December 13	"Single Ladies (Put a Ring on It)"	Beyoncé	228,000	
December 20	"Circus"	Britney Spears	212,000	
December 27	"Circus"	Britney Spears	153,000	

== See also ==
- 2008 in music
- Hot Digital Songs
