= 4 Minutes =

2008 single by Madonna

Single by Madonna featuring Justin Timberlake and Timbaland

from the album Hard Candy
- B-side: "Ring My Bell"
- Released: March 17, 2008
- Recorded: 2007
- Studio: Sarm West Studios (London); The Hit Factory (New York City)
- Genre: Dance-pop
- Length: 4:04 (album version); 3:10 (edit)
- Label: Warner Bros.
- Songwriters: Madonna Ciccone; Timothy Mosley; Justin Timberlake; Nate Hills
- Producers: Timbaland; Justin Timberlake; Danja

Madonna singles chronology
"Hey You" (2007)	"4 Minutes" (2008)	"Give It 2 Me" (2008)

Justin Timberlake singles chronology
"The Only Promise That Remains" (2007)	"4 Minutes" (2008)	"Dead and Gone" (2009)

Timbaland singles chronology
"Elevator" (2008)	"4 Minutes" (2008)	"Dangerous" (2008)

Music video
- "4 Minutes" on YouTube

"4 Minutes" is a song by American singer Madonna from her eleventh studio album Hard Candy (2008), featuring vocals by American musicians Justin Timberlake and Timbaland. It was released as the lead single from the album on March 17, 2008, by Warner Bros. Records. It marked the first time in Madonna's 25-year career that another artist was featured in a single. According to Madonna, the song is about saving the environment and "having a good time while we are doing it". She also cited the song as the inspiration for the documentary I Am Because We Are (2008).

The song was recorded at Sarm West Studios, in London, while the mixing of the track was finished at The Hit Factory studio in New York City. Sound engineer Demo Castellon first worked on the vocals and then on the beats, while the synths were composed by Timbaland and Danja. An uptempo dance-pop song with an urban and hip hop style, "4 Minutes" incorporates Timbaland's characteristic bhangra beats and the instrumentation used in the song includes brass, foghorns and cowbells. The lyrics carry a message of social awareness, inspired by Madonna's visit to Africa and the human suffering she witnessed.

"4 Minutes" received positive reviews from music critics, who called it a busy dance track and complimented its production, which was compared to that of a marching band. Some reviewers, however, felt that Madonna sounded like a featured artist on her own song. The song peaked at number three on the US Billboard Hot 100, giving Madonna her 37th top-ten single, breaking the record previously held by Elvis Presley, as the artist with most top-ten hits. Internationally, "4 Minutes" topped the charts in 21 countries, including Australia, Canada, Germany, Italy, Spain and the United Kingdom. "4 Minutes" has sold over three million copies in the United States and a total of five million copies worldwide.

The music video shows Madonna and Timberlake singing and running away from a giant black screen that devours everything in its path. "4 Minutes" was performed by Madonna on the promotional tour for Hard Candy and during the rave segment of the 2008–2009 Sticky & Sweet Tour. The song received two Grammy Award nominations for Best Pop Collaboration with Vocals and Best Remixed Recording, Non-Classical at the 2009 ceremony.

== Writing and inspiration ==
"We kind of had psychoanalytic sessions whenever we wrote songs. We'd sit down and we'd start talking about situations. And then we'd start talking about issues or problems or relationships with people. That was the only way, because you know, writing together with somebody is very intimate. So we had to find a place to start talking about something we cared about, so we could get into writing about something we cared about."

— Madonna talking to Interview about the writing process.

Following the release of her tenth studio album, Confessions on a Dance Floor (2005), Madonna wanted to record more dance music. When asked by producer Stuart Price what kind of music appealed to her, Madonna replied that she loved the records of singer Justin Timberlake and producer Timbaland, so she collaborated with them. "4 Minutes" was written by all three artists, along with Nate "Danja" Hills, and produced by Timbaland, Timberlake and Danja. The song, initially named "4 Minutes to Save the World", was one of the last to be produced for Madonna's album Hard Candy. In an interview with MTV News, Madonna said that the concept of the song was developed through discussions with Timberlake. She further explained the meaning of the song:

I don't think it's important to take it too literally. I think the song, more than anything, is about having a sense of urgency; about how we are you know, living on borrowed time essentially and people are becoming much more aware of the environment and how we're destroying the planet. We can't just keep distracting ourselves we do have to educate ourselves and wake up and do something about it. You know at the same time we don't want to be boring and serious and not have fun so it's kind of like well if we're going to save the planet can we have a good time while we are doing it?

Madonna clarified that her age did not have anything to do with the sense of urgency reflected in the track; instead, it was just something that she had in mind for a long time and with "4 Minutes", the sense seeped into her music. Ingrid Sischy from Interview magazine said that the song felt like a ballad for the world, containing "the sounds of a great big marching band. It's a giant dance song". Madonna agreed with Sischy and responded that the song was "a funny paradox" and was one of the inspirations behind her documentary I Am Because We Are (2008). The documentary dealt with the acute suffering and food shortage afflicting the African nation of Malawi.

== Recording and mixing ==
The recording sessions for "4 Minutes" took place at Sarm West Studios in West London, on a 72-channel SSL 9080 console. Paul Tingen from Sound on Sound magazine interviewed mixing and recording engineer Demacio "Demo" Castellon, who recalled that he did not attend the first recording sessions because he was working on another project. Over half of the song was already done by the time Castellon arrived, leaving him to do the programming in the intro and the end. At Sarm, Timbaland and Danja used Akai MPC3000 and Ensoniq ASR-10 sampling drum machines, Yamaha Motif workstation and synths to build the backing track for "4 Minutes". Castellon explained that the recording session took longer than expected. In total 46 tracks were used for drums and percussion and 16 stereo tracks for the bass. The whole session included 100 tracks, and further mixing was done on Pro Tools.

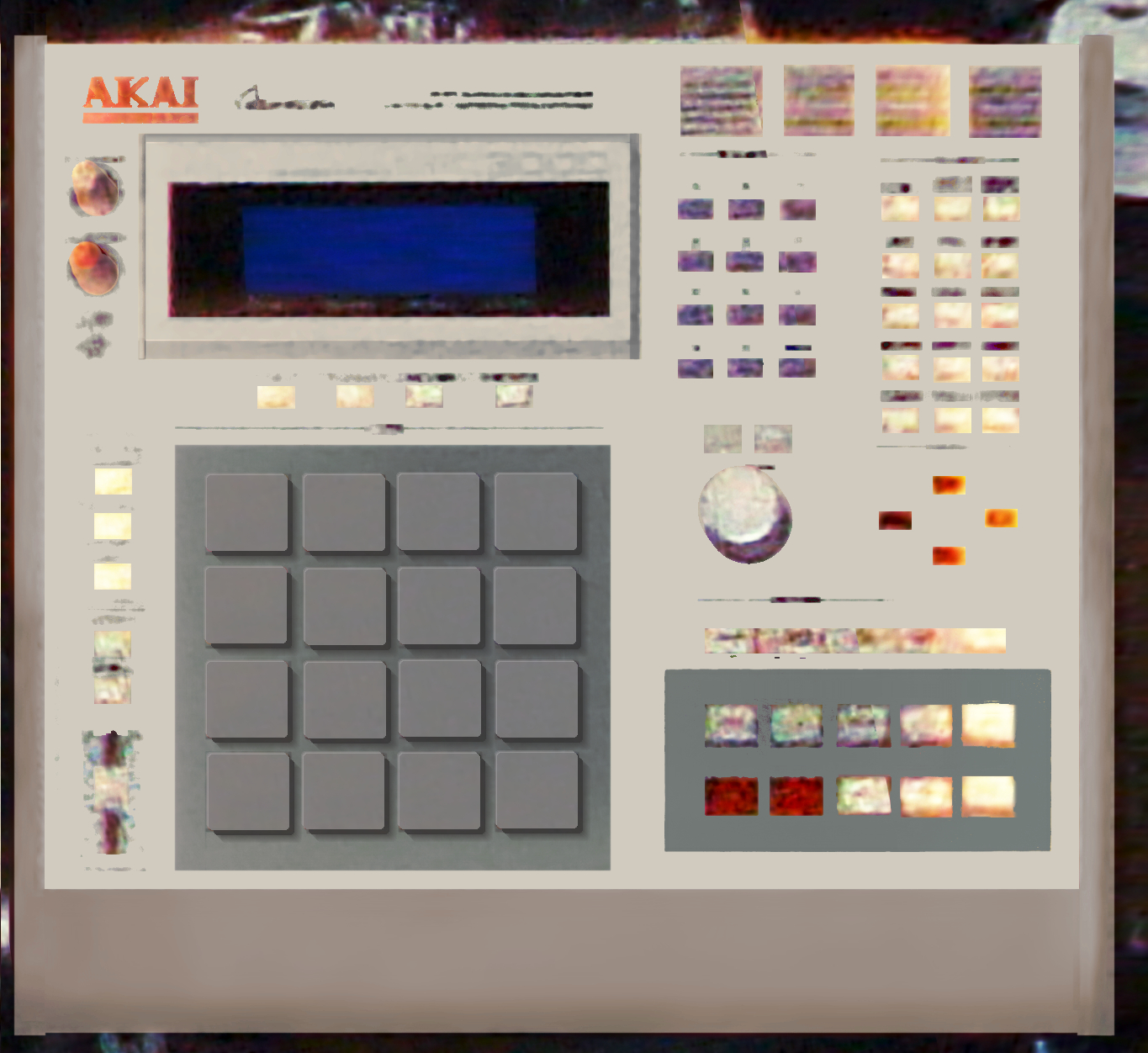
An Akai MPC3000 was used for recording the song.

In the case of '4 Minutes', Tim had a vision from the beginning of how things should go, especially sonically... When I opened up the session of '4 Minutes', there was so much going on that I knew right away that the hard part would be to make sure that the vocals would cut through and were right in the pocket. Beginning with working on the vocals was the only way to achieve this. After that I formed all the other parts around the vocals. The other challenge was to make sure that everything in the track sounded clear and that you could hear every instrument, every syllable, every breath. Also, I do almost always work linear in time on a track. It's easier, because when you're done, you're done. So I keep working on section after section, until I get to the end of the track and then I know the whole mix is pretty close.

Castellon said that he did not want the SSL's internal automation to interfere with his blending of the music, instead used Pro Tools, with automatic levels. According to him, he "then ran everything through the SSL, on which [he] did EQ, compression and panning." The mixing of the track was made at The Hit Factory studio, in Miami on a 96-channel SSL J-series desk. Considering the quantity of recorded backing tracks, Castellon's challenge was to make sure that the music did not overpower the vocals. He accomplished this by first mixing the vocals, then adding the music and the drums, which was an unusual method for him. Minimal digital plug-ins were employed for the mix as Castellon preferred the sound of outboard gear.

After the mixes were done, Castellon began working on Timbaland's introduction, and continued with Madonna and Timberlake's vocals. On Timbaland's vocals, he utilized the SSL's EQ to reduce "some bottom end", and he set input levels to avoid clipping. For Madonna and Timberlake he used SSL's dynamic range compression, and on Madonna's voice he applied "an eighth-note delay from a Lexicon PCM42", a reverb from Eventide H3500 for the verse, and TC Electronic TC3000 for the hook." These digital signal processors were employed to give Madonna's vocals a sense of stereophonic space. Castellon applied Waves Audio "Renaissance Compressor" plug-in to control the level of kick drum. He recalled that "there was one particular kick sound there that clashed with the other tracks, so Tim replaced it with another kick that had a very different note and sound." Using a Focusrite D2 equalizer let him "match the sound of that new kick drum to the other kick drum sounds". Once the drums and percussion were added, the recording and mixing of "4 Minutes" was finished.

== Composition ==
"4 Minutes"
A 24-second sample of Madonna's "4 Minutes" song where the chorus is played. Madonna and Justin Timberlake trade the verses

"4 Minutes" is an uptempo dance-pop song, composed in an urban, hip hop style. It incorporates the effect of a marching band, a clanging beat and instrumentation from a brass that is played in a "scale-like riff", as described by Caryn Ganz from Rolling Stone. Other musical instruments used are foghorns and cow bells. In "4 Minutes", Madonna and Timberlake sing and trade verses, the rhythm moves towards a hard clanging beat as Madonna sings the lines that the "road to hell is paved with good intentions." Madonna and Timberlake start singing the chorus with Timberlake singing the line of "We've only got four minutes to save the world". The track continues in the same momentum in the second verse and second chorus whence the track ends where every beat ceases except for Timbaland's characteristic bhangra beats, the brass riffs and Madonna singing the words "tick-tock" repeatedly, after which it ends.

According to the sheet music published at Musicnotes.com by Alfred Publishing, the song is written in the key of G minor and is set in time signature of common time with a tempo of 115 beats per minute. Timbaland's bhangra beats are featured at the start and the end of the song. Madonna and Timberlake's vocal range spans two octaves, from F_{3} to B♭_{5}. The song has a sequence of D–G–C–F–B♭–D in the verses and E♭_{5}–D_{5}–C_{5}–D_{5} in the chorus, as its chord progression. The lyrics of "4 Minutes" carry a message of social awareness, inspired by Madonna's visit to Africa and the human suffering she witnessed. Jon Pareles of The New York Times stated that "[h]owever, the song sounds as if four minutes is the time taken for a song to be a guaranteed pop hit or the time required for a quickie; in reality it is the only song from Hard Candy album which contains a message of social awareness in it." The sound of a clock ticking away emphasizes this message further. Madonna explained in New York magazine that the line "The road to hell is paved with good intentions" did not relate to her charity work. Instead it was her question to herself: "Do I understand this opinion that I've adopted or this Zeitgeist that I've allowed myself to be swept up in? Because you could have the best intentions but not have enough information and make huge mistakes." Regarding the line "Sometimes I feel what I need is a you intervention", Madonna explained, "[y]eah, meaning, sometimes I think you need to save me."

== Critical reception ==
"4 Minutes" received positive reviews upon release. Caryn Ganz of Rolling Stone called it "a loud, busy, energetic track", and commented that Timberlake did "his best Michael Jackson impression". Freedom du Lac of The Washington Post complimented the song for being busy and brassy. She commented: "[P]ropelled by a detonative marching-band beat [...] it's one of the most thrilling things Madonna has done in this decade." Billboard music reviewer and editor Chuck Taylor said that "There's an awful lot going on in the busy dance track [...] but the trade-off chorus between Madge and Justin of 'We've only got four minutes to save the world' is hooky enough unto itself to sell the song." He added that the song "qualifies as an event record between superpowers [Madonna and Timberlake] who not only share equal billing, but sound gangbusters together." Chris Williams of Entertainment Weekly called it a "flirty duet". Also from Entertainment Weekly, Chuck Arnold felt that "['4 Minutes'] tries a little too hard — sounding more like a Timberlake-Timbaland joint than a Madonna song", but pointing its "all-star magnetism".

According to Sal Cinquemani of Slant Magazine, the song is an "advertisement for the rest of the album." Joey Guerra of Houston Chronicle compared the track to the work of Nelly Furtado and felt that the composition was "a bid for radio play." Andy Gill of The Independent called "4 Minutes" one of Hard Candy's saviors. He noted that "the Mardi Gras marching-band bumping rambunctiously along", is one of the album's "most ambitious offerings." Mark Savage of BBC described the sound as "so futuristic it could realistically have been beamed in from the end of the world." Ben Thompson of The Guardian said: "It has a hard to escape sense that all concerned are going through the motions [of life] – effortlessly, sometimes brilliantly." Joan Anderman of The Boston Globe believed that the song is "chart-topper for its sheer star power as well as instant musical allure, and on the eve of Madonna's 50th birthday [...] '4 Minutes' feels a lot like an icon's can't-miss gift to herself." However, she noticed that the "shift in the power structure [is nowhere] more blatant than on '4 Minutes', where Madonna sounds like a featured guest trying to keep pace with Timbaland's colossal beats and Timberlake's nimble melody."

Stephen Thomas Erlewine of AllMusic praised the melodic and rhythmic hook, but was disappointed that Madonna's voice is "drowned out by Timbaland's farting four-note synth – which might not have been so bad if the tracks were fresher and if the whole enterprise didn't feel quite so joylessly mechanical." At the 51st Grammy Awards, "4 Minutes" garnered Madonna, Timberlake and Timbaland a nomination in the Best Pop Collaboration with Vocals category. Dutch musician Junkie XL also earned a nomination in the Best Remixed Recording, Non-Classical category for his remix of the song. While ranking Madonna's singles in honor of her 60th birthday, The Guardian's Jude Rogers placed "4 Minutes" at number 35, writing that "Timbaland's synth-brass intro here is fantastic, and the song's end-of-the-world grandeur still sounds razor-sharp", but stating that it would be "better without Timberlake".

== Chart performance ==
In the United States, "4 Minutes" debuted at number 68 on the Billboard Hot 100 chart for the issue dated April 5, 2008, based solely on airplay. Within a week, the song had jumped 65 places, reaching number three on the chart. This leap was spurred by first-week digital sales of 217,000, enabling the song to enter Billboard's Digital chart at number two, behind Mariah Carey's single "Touch My Body". The song became Madonna's first top-ten single since "Hung Up" (2005), and was her 37th Hot 100 top-ten hit, breaking the record previously held by Elvis Presley. "4 Minutes" was also her highest-charting single on the Hot 100 since "Music" reached the top of the chart in 2000. For Timberlake, "4 Minutes" became his ninth top-ten hit. On the Pop 100 chart, the song reached a peak of two. "4 Minutes" was a success on Billboard's dance charts, topping both the Hot Dance Club Play and the Hot Dance Airplay charts. Almost five months after its release, "4 Minutes" was certified double platinum by the Recording Industry Association of America (RIAA) for sales of two million paid digital downloads. "4 Minutes" was the tenth most downloaded song in the United States in 2008 with sales of 2.37 million, according to Nielsen SoundScan, and has sold over 3.1 million copies as of December 2016.

In Canada, Nielsen Broadcast Data Systems (BDS) confirmed that "4 Minutes" debuted at the top of the Canadian Contemporary Hit Radio chart. This marked the first time any song entered at the top of the CHR chart in BDS history. The song debuted at number 27 on the Canadian Hot 100 on March 27, 2008, and topped the chart the next week. By the end of the year, "4 Minutes" was the fifth best selling digital song in Canada with sales of 143,000 copies, and ranked fourth on the year-end tabulation of the Canadian Hot 100.

"4 Minutes" was also a success in Australia and New Zealand. The song debuted at number three on the Australian ARIA Singles Chart, and ascended to the number-one position two weeks later, where it stayed for three consecutive weeks. "4 Minutes" was certified platinum by the Australian Recording Industry Association (ARIA) for the shipment of 70,000 copies. In New Zealand, "4 Minutes" made its debut at number 14 on the New Zealand Singles Chart, and ascended to the top ten, finally peaking at number three. The song has been certified gold by the Recording Industry Association of New Zealand (RIANZ) for shipment of 7,500 copies.

In the United Kingdom, "4 Minutes" debuted on the UK Singles Chart at number seven. The song became Madonna's 60th UK top-ten single. It debuted on the airplay charts at number 19, with first week tallies of 564 plays and 27.10 million listeners. The song rose to the top of the chart on April 20, 2008 (for the week ending date April 26, 2008), with sales of 40,634 copies, thus giving Madonna her 13th British number-one single and gave both Timberlake and Timbaland their third number one. It remained at the top for four weeks. According to the Official Charts Company, it was the ninth best-selling song of 2008 and has sold 627,000 copies there as of April 2019, being certified Platinum by the British Phonographic Industry (BPI). "4 Minutes" was also number one on Billboard's European Hot 100 Singles for four weeks. Overall, "4 Minutes" reached number one in 21 countries, and sold over five million copies worldwide.

== Music video ==
=== Background ===
The music video was directed by French duo Jonas & François and filmed at Black Island Studios in London from January 31 to February 2, 2008. It featured choreography by Jamie King, who worked on Madonna's Confessions, Re-Invention and Drowned World tours as well as her video for the single "Sorry" (2006). Japanese hip hop dancing duo Hamutsun Serve also made an appearance in the video. Before its release, Rolling Stone said that in the video Madonna and Timberlake act as if they were "superheroes" while they evade multiple obstacles. In the video, Madonna wore a cream colored corset, glistening black boots and styled her hair in platinum blond waves while Timberlake wore mainly denims and a scarf around his neck. Regarding the idea behind the music video, Madonna said that "it was conceptualistic". She explained that the video was shot like a march past; "It's a movement, and we want to take everybody with us." About the idea of a black screen devouring everything, Madonna said,

None of us did [understand the concept of the black screen]. It was just, you know, it's very conceptual. We basically gave the song to the two French directors [Jonas & François] and they came up with the only concept that I thought was interesting, with this black sort of amorphous graphic line slowly eating up the world. I just liked that as a concept.

=== Synopsis and reception ===
A still from the music video showing Madonna and Timberlake. The black background is seen behind Timberlake, devouring his flesh.

The video starts with Timbaland chanting the opening line in front of a giant timer screen that counts down from four minutes. As he sings, a black geometric patterned screen comes from behind and engulfs all of the musical devices present. Madonna and Timberlake enter a house but run away from it after finding the screen there, which starts eating the hands and legs of the inhabitants of the house, thus showing their insides. After a number of shots showing Madonna and Timberlake jumping on and over cars to escape from the screen, they finally move into a supermarket. The screen follows them, consuming the long lines of stalls and the people present there. As the second chorus starts, they arrive in front of the screen where Timbaland is singing. After choreographed dancing, Madonna performs a back arch as the timer reaches zero. The last "tick-tock, tick-tock" sound is heard, Madonna and Timberlake dance again on a long stage; the black screen approaches them from both sides. The video ends with both of them kissing, and the black screen devouring them. Timberlake's bones and ribs, and Madonna's cheeks are seen in the last shot.

Regarding the video, Madonna said it was like "[g]oody goody gum drops", referring to the candy-oriented theme of the album. Virginia Heffernan from The New York Times called the video heart-pounding, and compared its momentum with the music video of "Thriller, "In the Air Tonight" and "Shadows of the Night". However, Eric Wilson from the same newspaper commented that the video did not yield a breakout Madonna look compared to her videos from the 1980s. Singer Miley Cyrus created her own version of the video and posted it on her YouTube channel. Madonna responded to it in her own video and said, "All you people out there who are making videos to my new single, '4 Minutes,' keep up the good work, nice job." "4 Minutes" was nominated for an award at the 2008 MTV Video Music Awards in the "Best Dancing in a Video" category, but lost to the Pussycat Dolls' single "When I Grow Up". In 2009, the video was included on Madonna's compilation, Celebration: The Video Collection.

The music video on YouTube has received over 210 million views as of April 2024.

== Live performances ==
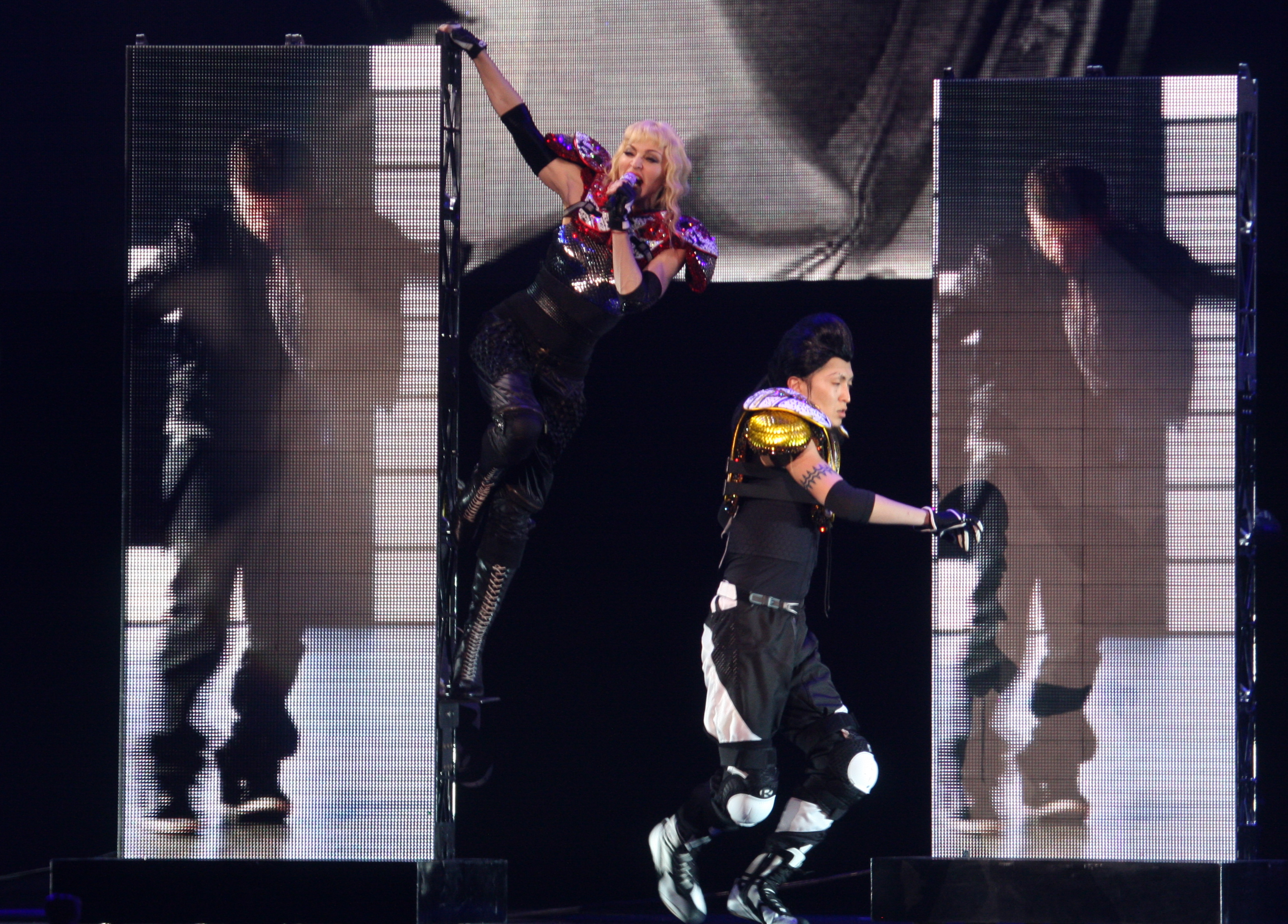
Madonna performing "4 Minutes" during the Sticky & Sweet Tour; Timberlake can be seen on the backdrop screens.

The song was performed during the Hard Candy Promo Tour and Sticky & Sweet Tour (2008–2009). At the promotional tour, "4 Minutes" was performed as the third song of the setlist. Madonna wore a shiny black outfit with black tails, Adidas track pants and high-heeled, lace-up boots for the performance. Justin Timberlake made an appearance alongside Madonna, at the Roseland Ballroom in New York, to perform the song. As Timbaland appeared on the video screens, the beat of the song started. The four side-stage video screens began to glide across the stage, and swiveled around to reveal Timberlake behind one and Madonna behind the other. They performed the song in a similar choreography from the music video.

During the "4 Minutes" performance on the Sticky & Sweet Tour, Madonna wore a futuristic robotic outfit designed by Heatherette. She coupled it with metallic plates on her shoulder and a wig with long curled hair. Madonna and her dancers emerged from behind backdrops, on which Timbaland and Timberlake appeared, to perform their lines. An apparent duet between Madonna and Timberlake ensues, with Timberlake singing and dancing his part from the screens. He joined Madonna in person, for the show at Los Angeles's Dodger Stadium on November 6, 2008, the same show in which Britney Spears appeared alongside Madonna to perform "Human Nature". They performed "4 Minutes" in similar fashion to the promotional tour choreography. Timbaland sang his part of the song in person on November 26, 2008, at Dolphin Stadium in Miami Gardens, Florida. "4 Minutes" was also used as mashups during the performance of songs like "Vogue" and "Hung Up". On July 27, 2017, Madonna made a special appearance at Leonardo DiCaprio's annual fundraising gala, which took place in Saint-Tropez, France, and performed "4 Minutes" dressed in a green suit with feathers.

== Usage in media ==
In November 2023, "4 Minutes" was used in a holiday advertising campaign for Marshalls. "4 Minutes" was used in the film Get Smart (2008), in a scene and its film credits.

== Glee version ==
"4 Minutes" was one of the songs covered by the cast of Glee during the April 20, 2010 episode "The Power of Madonna". The fictional character Kurt Hummel, portrayed by Chris Colfer, sang Madonna's parts while Mercedes Jones (Amber Riley) sang Timberlake's. In the episode, the song is performed during a routine by the high-school cheering squad, accompanied by the school band. The version was released both as a digital download single and on the EP, Glee: The Music, The Power of Madonna. The Glee "4 Minutes" cover charted on the Hot Digital Songs of Billboard at number 55 on May 8, 2010, while reaching number 89 and number 70 on the Billboard Hot 100 and Canadian Hot 100, respectively.

== Track listings and formats ==
- UK CD 1
1. "4 Minutes" (Album Version) – 4:04
2. "4 Minutes" (Bob Sinclar Space Funk Remix) – 5:39
- UK CD 2; Australian and German maxi-CD
1. "4 Minutes" (Album Version) – 4:04
2. "4 Minutes" (Bob Sinclar Space Funk Remix) – 5:39
3. "4 Minutes" (Junkie XL Remix) – 6:16
- UK 12-inch vinyl
1. "4 Minutes" (Edit) – 3:10
2. "4 Minutes" (Bob Sinclar Space Funk Edit) – 3:23
3. "4 Minutes" (Junkie XL Remix Edit) – 4:39
4. "4 Minutes" (Tracy Young House Radio) – 3:33
- European and US maxi-CD single
1. "4 Minutes" (Bob Sinclar Space Funk Remix) – 5:39
2. "4 Minutes" (Junkie XL Remix) – 6:16
3. "4 Minutes" (Tracy Young House Mix) – 7:55
4. "4 Minutes" (Peter Saves Paris Remix) – 8:52
5. "4 Minutes" (Rebirth Remix) – 7:57
6. "4 Minutes" (Junkie XL Dirty Dub) – 4:52
- US 2× 12-inch vinyl
1. "4 Minutes" (Bob Sinclar Space Funk Remix) – 5:39
2. "4 Minutes" (Peter Saves Paris Remix) – 8:52
3. "4 Minutes" (Tracy Young House Mix) – 7:55
4. "4 Minutes" (Junkie XL Dirty Dub) – 4:52
5. "4 Minutes" (Album Version) – 4:04
6. "4 Minutes" (Rebirth Remix) – 7:57
7. "4 Minutes" (Junkie XL Remix) – 6:16

== Credits and personnel ==
Credits and personnel are adapted from the Hard Candy album liner notes.

- Madonna – writer, lead vocals, background vocals, executive producer
- Justin Timberlake – writer, lead vocals, producer
- Timbaland – writer, vocals, producer, drum programming, recording
- Danja – writer, producer, keyboard instrument
- Demacio "Demo" Castellon – programming, mixing, scratching and recording at Sarm West Studios (London) and The Hit Factory Studios (Miami)
- Marcella Araica – mixing, scratching
- Ron Taylor – Pro Tools editing

== Charts ==
=== Weekly charts ===
Chart (2008)	Peak position
Argentina (CAPIF)	13
Australia (ARIA)	1
Austria (Ö3 Austria Top 40)	2
Belgium (Ultratop 50 Flanders)	1
Belgium (Ultratop 50 Wallonia)	1
Canada Hot 100 (Billboard)	1
Canada AC (Billboard)	35
Canada CHR/Top 40 (Billboard)	1
Canada Hot AC (Billboard)	1
Chile (Monitor Latino)	3
Costa Rica (Monitor Latino)	1
CIS Airplay (TopHit)	5
Croatia International Airplay (HRT)	1
Czech Republic Airplay (ČNS IFPI)	4
Denmark (Tracklisten)	1
El Salvador (Monitor Latino)	2
European Hot 100 Singles (Billboard)	1
European Radio Airplay (Billboard)	1
Finland (Suomen virallinen lista)	1
France (SNEP)	2
Germany (GfK)	1
Global Dance Songs (Billboard)	1
Greece Digital Songs (Billboard)	1
Hungary (Dance Top 40)	8
Hungary (Rádiós Top 40)	1
Hungary (Single Top 40)	2
Iceland (Tónlistinn)	5
Ireland (IRMA)	1
Italy (FIMI)	1
Japan Hot 100 (Billboard)	3
Mexico Anglo (Monitor Latino)	1
Netherlands (Dutch Top 40)	1
Netherlands (Single Top 100)	1
New Zealand (Recorded Music NZ)	3
Norway (VG-lista)	1
Poland (ZPAV)	3
Portugal Digital Songs (Billboard)	1
Romania (Romanian Top 100)	1
Russia Airplay (TopHit)	2
Scottish Singles Sales (Official Charts)	1
Slovakia Airplay (ČNS IFPI)	2
Spain (Promusicae)	1
Sweden (Sverigetopplistan)	2
Switzerland (Schweizer Hitparade)	1
Turkey (Billboard)	1
UK Singles (Official Charts)	1
UK Hip Hop/R&B (Official Charts)	1
US Billboard Hot 100	3
US Adult Pop Airplay (Billboard)	20
US Dance Club Songs (Billboard)	1
US Dance Airplay (Billboard)	1
US Latin Pop Airplay (Billboard)	27
US Pop Airplay (Billboard)	5
US Rhythmic Airplay (Billboard)	28
Venezuela Pop/Rock (Record Report)	1

=== Year-end charts ===
Chart (2008)	Position
Australia (ARIA)	15
Austria (Ö3 Austria Top 40)	11
Belgium (Ultratop 50 Flanders)	3
Belgium (Ultratop 50 Wallonia)	13
Brazil (Crowley Broadcast Analysis)	14
Canada (Canadian Hot 100)	4
Canada CHR/Top 40 (Billboard)	8
Canada Hot AC (Billboard)	3
CIS (TopHit)	45
Croatia International Airplay (HRT)	1
Denmark (Tracklisten)	5
European Hot 100 Singles (Billboard)	5
Finland (Suomen virallinen lista)	2
France (SNEP)	14
Germany (Media Control GfK)	9
Hungary (Dance Top 40)	67
Hungary (Rádiós Top 40)	13
Ireland (IRMA)	11
Italy (FIMI)	7
Japan (Japan Hot 100)	24
Netherlands (Dutch Top 40)	11
Netherlands (Single Top 100)	4
New Zealand (RIANZ)	31
Norway Spring Period (VG-lista)	1
Russia Airplay (TopHit)	24
Spain (PROMUSICAE)	7
Sweden (Sverigetopplistan)	3
Switzerland (Schweizer Hitparade)	6
Taiwan (Hito Radio)	26
UK Singles (OCC)	9
UK Urban (Music Week)	19
US Billboard Hot 100	23
US Dance Club Play (Billboard)	24
US Mainstream Top 40 (Billboard)	38
Venezuela Anglo (Record Report)	2

Chart (2009)	Position
Hungary (Rádiós Top 40)	138

Chart (2010)	Position
Finland (Suomen virallinen lista)	10

=== Decade-end charts ===
Chart (2000–2009)	Position
Australia (ARIA)	77
CIS Airplay (TopHit)	130
Russia Airplay (TopHit)	124

== Certifications and sales ==
Region	Certification	Certified units/sales
Australia (ARIA)	Platinum	70,000^{^}
Belgium (BRMA)	Gold	
Brazil (Pro-Música Brasil)	Platinum	60,000^{*}
Canada Digital downloads	—	143,000
Denmark (IFPI Danmark)	2× Platinum	30,000^{^}
France	—	240,000
Finland (Musiikkituottajat)	Platinum	16,799
Germany (BVMI)	Platinum	300,000^{^}
Italy (FIMI)	Gold	77,561
Japan (RIAJ)	Gold	100,000^{*}
Mexico (AMPROFON) Master ringtone	2× Gold	20,000^{*}
New Zealand (RMNZ)	Platinum	30,000^{‡}
Norway (IFPI Norway)	3× Platinum	30,000^{*}
Spain (Promusicae)	3× Platinum	60,000^{*}
Spain (Promusicae) Ringtone	2× Platinum	40,000^{*}
Sweden (GLF)	Gold	10,000^{^}
United Kingdom (BPI)	Platinum	627,000
United States (RIAA)	2× Platinum	3,100,000
^{*} Sales figures based on certification alone.^{^} Shipments figures based on certification alone.^{‡} Sales+streaming figures based on certification alone.

== Release history ==
Region	Date	Format	Ref.
Italy	March 17, 2008	Radio impact	
United States	March 25, 2008	Digital download	
Germany	April 11, 2008	CD single	
France	April 14, 2008	Maxi single	
Australia	April 18, 2008	Remixes digital download	
United Kingdom	April 21, 2008	CD single	
United States	August 11, 2009	Remixes digital download	

== See also ==
- List of number-one singles of 2008 (Australia)
- List of number-one singles of 2008 (Belgium Flanders)
- List of number-one singles of 2008 (Belgium Wallonia)
- List of number-one singles of 2008 (Canada)
- List of number-one singles of 2008 (Denmark)
- List of number-one singles of 2008 (Europe)
- List of number-one singles of 2008 (Finland)
- List of number-one singles of 2008 (Germany)
- List of number-one singles of 2008 (Ireland)
- List of best-selling singles in Finland
- List of number-one singles of 2008 (Italy)
- List of number-one singles of 2008 (Netherlands)
- List of number-one singles of 2008 (Norway)
- List of number-one singles of 2008 (Spain)
- List of number-one singles of 2008 (Switzerland)
- List of number-one singles of 2008 (UK)
- List of number-one dance airplay singles of 2008 (US)
- List of number-one dance singles of 2008 (US)
- List of number-one digital songs of 2008 (US)
- List of Romanian Top 100 number ones of the 2000s
- List of best-selling singles of the 2000s in Australia
- List of Platinum singles in the United Kingdom awarded since 2000
