= Aadat Se Majboor =

Aadat Se Majboor (transl. Can't Help Myself) may refer to:

- Aadat Se Majboor (film), a 1982 Indian Hindi-language film
- Aadat Se Majboor (TV series), a 2017 Indian TV series broadcast on SAB TV
- "Aadat Se Majboor", a song from the 2011 Indian film Ladies vs Ricky Bahl

== See also ==
- Can't Help Myself (disambiguation)
