= Bruce Elliott-Smith =

British songwriter and producer

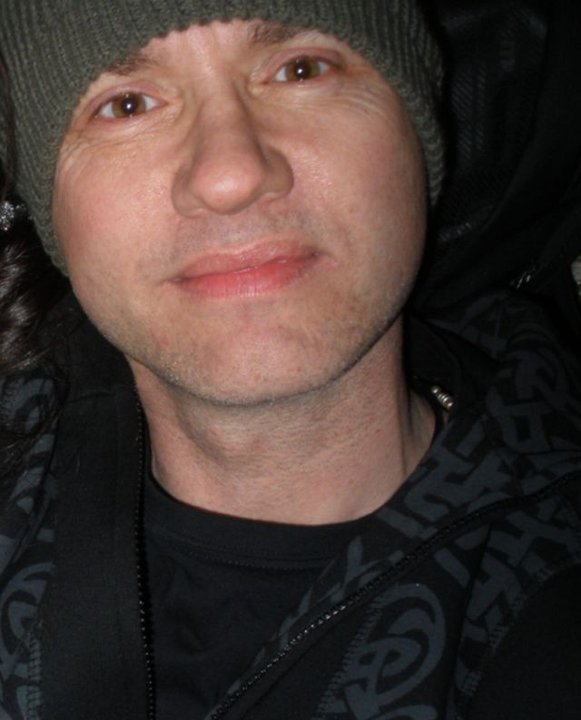
Bruce Elliott-Smith - Grammy winning Songwriter & Producer

Bruce Elliott-Smith is a British songwriter and producer. He was awarded a Grammy in 2004 for his work with Australian singer-songwriter Kylie. He also was the co-writer on the 2008 single "I Can't Help Myself," which was a number-one Billboard Dance Airplay single for the British project Bellatrax featuring Sophia May.

He had UK top 10 singles with "You Wont Forget About Me" Danni Minogue and "Love Me Right" Angel City.

Bruce also has German Top 20 singles and album writer/producer credits for his contribution to artist ATB with Marrakech & Ecstasy and another a UK Dance No.1 with Paul Oakenfold Hypnotised

Other chart success includes No 1 with Asia leading artist Boa for the song Happiness Lies No. 1 (BoA album)

The electronic music artist Nathassia made history by performing one of Bruce's co-writes at the Valley of the Kings in the Luxor Temple at the Nefertiti International Fashion Festival.

Film credits include Proof (2005 writer of We Can Be Free) & In America (2002 writer of Hold Me Tight) https://www.imdb.com/name/nm2402513/

Official website Bruce Elliott-Smith
