= Behind (song) =

Single by Flanders
- Released: 2008
- Recorded: 2008
- Genre: Electronic; Electronic dance music Progressive Trance; House
- Label: Ultra Records (US); Ego Music (Italy); Gut Records (UK)
- Songwriter(s): Alessandro Bunetto, Francesco Abbate, Giuliana Fraglica, Marco Giudice, Vincenzo Callea
- Producer(s): Alessandro Bunetto, Francesco Abbate, Giuliana Fraglica, Marco Giudice, Vincenzo Callea

"Behind" is name of a 2008 Electronica/Dance single from the Italian Alternative/Electronica group Flanders. The group co-wrote and co-produced the track with producer/remixer Vincenzo Callea, which is their follow up to their 2007 debut single "By Your Side." In the United States, it is by date their best known single, where it spent 20 weeks on the Billboard Hot Dance Airplay chart, including a 2-week stay at number one in December 2008.

Behind was remixed by ATB for his 2009 album Future Memories. His version was the 3rd single released from that album.

== CD, Maxi Singles ==
Ego 12" Maxi-single

1. Behind (Mickey Slim Remix) - 6:33
2. Behind (Callea Club Remix) - 7:30
3. Behind (Deflect Remix) - 7:26

== Chart positions ==
- Hot Dance Airplay: #1

== See also ==
- List of number-one dance airplay hits of 2008 (U.S.)
