= Nathassia =

Dutch-born singer songwriter

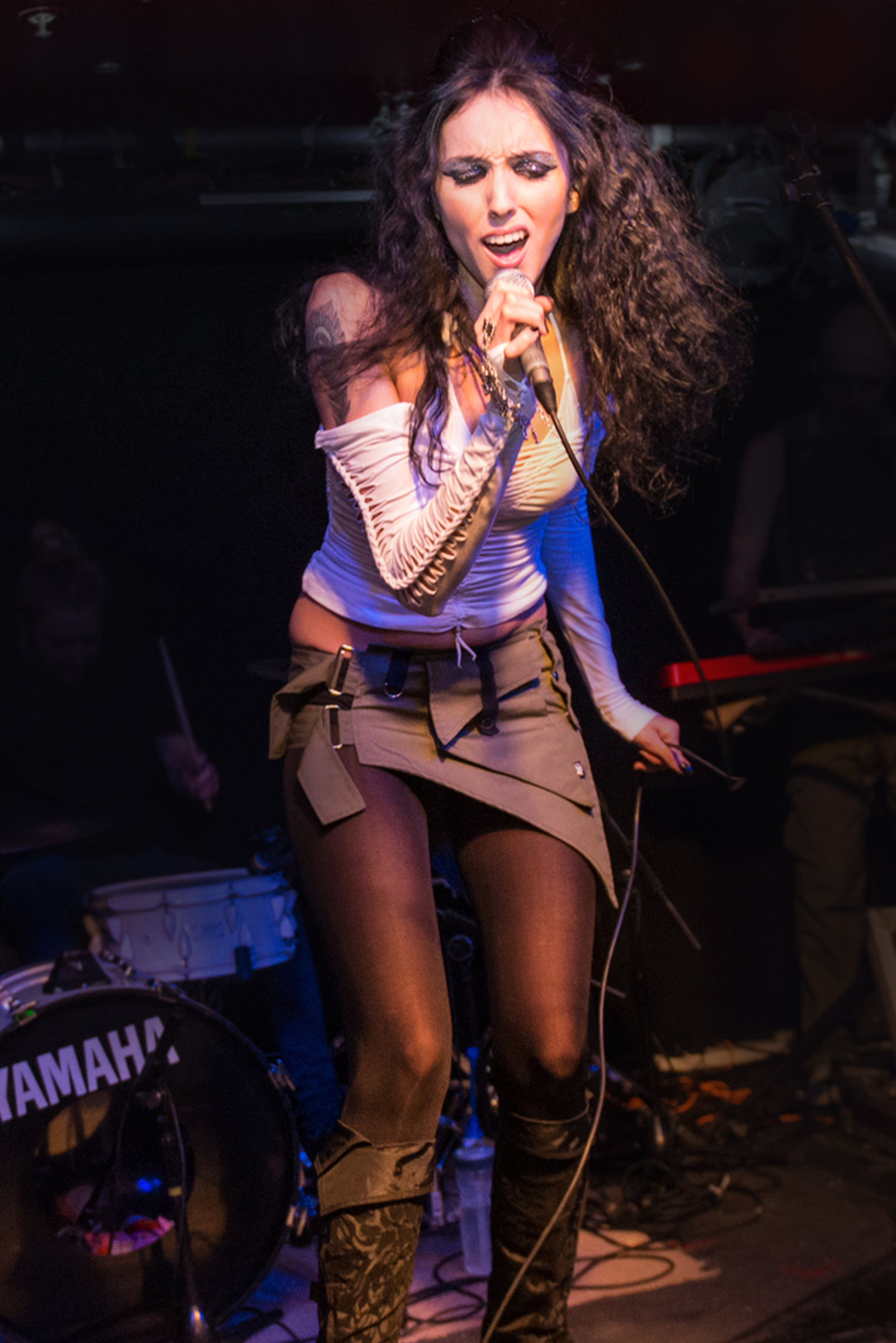
- Nathassia performing at O2 Academy
- Born: Dewika Nathassia Saalbach; Gouda, Netherlands
- Other names: Nathassia Devine, Goddess Is A DJ
- Musical career
- Genres: Pop - Electronic
- Occupations: Singer; songwriter; DJ
- Years active: 2014–present
- Website: nathassia.com

Nathassia (pronounced Na-ta-see-ah) is a Dutch electronic music artist, DJ, singer and songwriter from Gouda, South Holland, currently residing in London, UK. Nathassia made music history by being the first electronic music artist to perform at the Luxor Temple in Egypt at the Nefertiti International Fashion Festival in April 2016, organised by Mona al Mansouri. Nathassia is known and praised for being an ambassador for multiculturalism and has according to leading electronic dance music magazine We Rave You perfectly emulated the ideology of Multiculturalism via her own music. Since lockdown in 2020 Nathassia has hosted Goddess Is A DJ, a weekly radio show which is broadcast to 10 million listeners on 140 stations in more than 40 countries including Digitally Imported Radio. DJmag said about her radio and live shows: "Nathassia takes the listener on a musical journey with many emotional twists and epic moments in order to discover a range of multicultural sounds and genres of electronic dance music". Her singles "Change The World, "In My Head", "Rainmaker" and "Lair" were playlisted on Club MTV and MTV Dance International highest chart position at number 9 in Club MTV's Big 20. Her single "Guardian Angel" charted at number 3 in the UK Dance chart and her following singles "My House", "Tall" and "Disco Kid" all charted at number 2. Nathassia was included in the DJane Mag Top 100 in 2025, an annual international ranking recognising female DJs worldwide. In 2026, Nathassia entered The EE Official Big Top 40 From Global for the first time with her single "Perfect Harmony". The song debuted as the highest new entry of the week at number 17 and peaked at that position, before placing at number 22 in its second week on the chart.

== Early life ==
Nathassia was born and raised in Gouda, Netherlands by a Dutch father and an Indo-Surinamese mother, who was raised in Suriname, South America. She grew up absorbing many multicultural musical influences and utilizes her platform and artistry now as an opportunity to embrace her multicultural heritage. In an interview on Surinamese National TV, Nathassia said that she first started practicing her stage performance at the age of two when her father brought home an old microphone from a coach for her to play with.

== Music career ==
As part of her studies International Music Management at InHolland University in Haarlem, North Holland, she moved to London to gain experience in the music business with her now management company ArchangelUK. On one of her first working days in their studio the singer who was booked called in sick and Nathassia was asked if she could sing instead, the result was "Someone Like Me" with Italian producers "Soulcast".

Having tasted global success as a featured artist with Russian electronic music producers Moonbeam including being A List on Kiss FM UK and performing live on Dutch National Radio 3FM, Nathassia completed her studies in The Netherlands and moved to London to set up her recording studio's in Brixton, South London to write and record her debut album "Light Of The World" which was released on 30 March 2017 by Inter-dimensional Recordings.

Nathassia co-produced the album with underground electronic music producers including British Dubstep producer Stenchman and chose to write several songs with Grammy Award winner writer/producer Bruce Elliott-Smith. The first single that was released from the album, "Turning Headz", charted at number 19 in the Music Week Pop chart, number 22 in the UK National club chart and gained support from the likes of e.g. Eddy Temple Morris, BBC 6, Kiss and Mixmag.

In August 2016 Nathassia was featured on the Channel 4 UK TV show The Casting Couch. In May 2017 Nathassia commenced her first national UK tour called Feel The Future Now.

On 21 June 2018, Nathassia released her second album Devine Sunrise produced with downtempo artist / DJ Pete Ardron. The album reached the Top 5 in the UK iTunes Album Chart (Electronic).

Her single "In My Head" was playlisted on Club MTV and MTV Dance International and charted at number 9 in Club MTV's Big 20. "Change The World" reached MTV UK's Top 20 and was playlisted on Club MTV, MTV Dance International and Clubland TV.
