= Behind =

Behind may refer to:

- Behind (album), a 1992 album by Superior
- Behind (Australian rules football), a method of scoring in Australian rules football, awarding one point
- "Behind" (song), a 2008 single by Flanders
- Behind (restaurant), in London
- Behind, a slang term for the buttocks
