= Bellatrax =

English music project

- Also known as: Dececio, Blue Star, Insignia, Red Square
- Origin: Bristol, England
- Genres: Deep house, electronica, funky house
- Years active: 2000–present
- Labels: Nervous, Kontor Records, Bedtime Records
- Members: Chris Dececio; Sophia May
- Past members: Bruce Elliott-Smith; Steph Mazzacani

Bellatrax is a house/electronic project from Bristol, England that is fronted by producer Chris Dececio, who also uses the name as his alias for remixes.

== Background ==
Prior to using the Bellatrax project, Dececio had used his own last name when he released his first recording in 2000. In 2002, Dececio created the project Redd Square and released the single "In Your Hands," which featured Tiff Lacey. As Insignia, Dececio released two songs, "Revelation" in 2001, and "Kaleidoscope" in 2007.

Under the Bellatrax name, the project has scored a number one Billboard Dance Airplay single with "I Can't Help Myself" in 2008, featuring his collaborator and vocalist Sophia May Hurst (credited as her recording stage name Sophia May). The two continue to work together occasionally.

As a remixer, Dececio has used the Bellatrax name on over 50 singles, among them Kylie Minogue's "Better than Today," which reached number one on Billboard Dance Club Songs chart in 2011.

== Selected works ==
As Dececio

- "Spectrum" (2000)

As Insignia

- "Revelation" (2001)
- "Kaleidoscope Eyes" (2007)

As Blue Star

- "Dreaming" (2003)

As Bellatrax

- "I Can't Help Myself" (Featuring Sophia May) (2007)
- "Can't Hold Back" (Featuring Tina Cousins) (2009)
- "World Keeps Turning" (with Sylvia Tosun, Alex M.O.R.P.H. and Chris Ortega) (2011)
- "Keep You" (featuring Luke Derrick) (2013)
- "Falling For You" (featuring Sophia May) (2013)
- "What Love Is" (featuring Sophia May) (2014)
