= The Jealous Sound =

American rock band (2000–2017)

- Origin: Los Angeles, California
- Genres: Emo pop
- Years active: 2000–2017
- Labels: The Militia Group, Better Looking, Music is Subjective, INgrooves, Rise
- Spinoff of: Knapsack, Sunday's Best, Jawbox, Shudder to Think
- Past members: Blair Shehan; Bob Penn; Michael Richardson; Jeremy Tappero; Pedro Benito; Josh Staples; Adam Wade; John McGinnis

The Jealous Sound was an American band based in Los Angeles that, as of August 2012, consisted of vocalist and guitarist Blair Shehan (formerly of Knapsack), guitarist Michael Richardson, bassist Jeremy Tappero, and drummer Bob Penn. In 2012, Richardson (formerly of the American three-piece rock band, The New Trust) replaced original member, Pedro Benito (formerly of Sunday's Best) on lead guitar. Benito has moved into film and television score composition. Categorized as an indie rock band, the Jealous Sound released its second and last full-length album, A Gentle Reminder, on January 31, 2012. As of December 2016, the band was signed to Rise Records.

== History ==
=== Formation (2000) ===
The band originally formed from multiple American, 1990s "indie" bands, with each member a former part of one of these groups. Shehan (Knapsack) led the band on vocals and guitar, with Benito (Sunday's Best) on lead guitar. They were joined by bassist John McGinnis (Neither Trumpets Nor Drums) and Tony Palermo (Pulley) on drums. Adam Wade, of the then-recently disbanded Jawbox and Shudder to Think, later replaced Palermo on drums.

Shehan provided a summary in January 2013 interview:

Me and the drummer from Knapsack, my friend Colby [Mancasola], went to high school together ... We went to college together and when we got to college at UC-Davis, we formed Knapsack ... I hung out in the area after we graduated and ended up moving to L.A. Colby decided to take a full-time job with eMusic and [bassist] Sergie Loobkoff was splitting time with his band Samiam, which had kicked back into gear, so his time was divided. Colby wanted to move on and we did one last tour with At the Drive-In and that was that. In L.A., I started moving forward with The Jealous Sound in 1999 and 2000.

Shehan further explained that the eventual formation ("morphing") of the Jealous Sound was inevitable, as the band is not dissimilar to Knapsack, asserting, "This is the direction I had wanted to go and was going and would continue to go."

=== Self-titled EP and Kill Them With Kindness (2000–2003) ===
The band's self-titled debut EP The Jealous Sound was released in 2000 on the Better Looking Records label.

The debut album, Kill Them With Kindness, recorded with producer Tim O'Heir and also released on Better Looking Records, ranked No. 39 on Spin magazine's "40 Best Albums of 2003" list; the magazine's review in June 2003, by Andy Greenwald, rated the album as "9 of 10". Following the album's success, the band received major label attention and subsequently signed with Mojo Records.

=== Got Friends EP (2005–2008) ===
In 2003, the band was set to release an album on Mojo Records, but soon after the signing, Mojo was sold to Jive Records. However, the latter did not display a keen interest in the band (Shehan stated that "They were interested, but they didn't want to do one thing or another."). The band pressured the label to release it from its contractual obligations, and Jive eventually paid the band to depart from its roster. The band then signed with The Militia Group for their second album, and used the money from Jive to release the Got Friends EP. Shehan eventually clarified the situation in January 2013, explaining, "It was a funny situation. Things are so different now than they were back then. There was some chatter about it [the major label contract] being the reason why the band broke up. That had nothing to do with it."

The band's official website was not updated for the remainder of 2005, and a rumor spread that Shehan had left the band. However, on June 1, 2006, the band posted on its MySpace page that work on the next album was progressing. On August 24, 2005, a Militia Group staff member publicly stated, "I have heard the new songs myself. They're still putting out material."

After a long silence, leading to more rumors of the band's demise, on August 15, 2008, the band posted on their MySpace page confirming the title of their new release, Got Friends. The post said the album would be out "real soon" and to stay tuned. On September 4, 2008, the band posted the following on their MySpace page: "Got Friends available on iTunes 10/14/2008". The Got Friends EP was released in October 2008.

The rumors of the band's demise were confounded when, according to a blog post on The Village Voice's website posted on October 14, 2008, the Jealous Sound broke up in 2005, and the songs on the Got Friends EP were "the last shreds of material recorded [for a new album] before Shehan went crazy and more or less disappeared." Shehan later revealed that he relocated to Las Vegas, US, where he had secured employment; Shehan explained in an interview:

There's a sense that I flipped out and left; people thought I went crazy. But what's crazy? Staying in a band at my age with no stability? Ignoring the normal parts of becoming an adult? People don't necessarily understand what we do, and the commitment it takes to do what we do.

Following two years in Las Vegas, Shehan briefly moved to Florida before resuming work on the Jealous Sound. In January 2013, he further clarified, "Personally, I was out of gas. It was a strange time. We had started a record but didn’t finish and I ended up leaving and we didn’t do it. I feel bad about that. That was a failure on my part. I came back and life’s funny. It’s all okay and those are just the things that happened."

=== End of hiatus ===
Shehan's return to Los Angeles signified the end of the band's hiatus. On February 13, 2009, the band published a blog post titled "There is hope for us...." on their Myspace page, with a short message promising more from the band soon. "Thank you all for standing by our side.... We will post something with a little more detail soon. Promise. Love, The Jealous Sound." Another post confirmed on June 24, 2009, that the band would accompany Sunny Day Real Estate on their 2009 reunion tour.

=== A Gentle Reminder (2009-onwards) ===
The band's public status markedly increased following the announcement of a new album. A sporadically updated blog featured updates on the recording sessions, including an announcement that friends of the band, Nate Mendel (Foo Fighters) and Bob Penn (the CoCo B's) were due to play bass and drums, respectively, on the new album. Mendel's involvement secured the band a year's worth of recording and writing time in a studio owned by the Foo Fighters.

In October 2011, Shehan announced that the new album would be called A Gentle Reminder and was scheduled for a January 2012 release; this was also officially posted on the band's Facebook page. The band completed a small promotion tour in December 2011, with a full tour planned for 2012.

A Gentle Reminder was released on January 31, 2012. A song from new album, "Your Eyes Were Shining", was uploaded onto the Jealous Sound's SoundCloud website in June 2012.

Following the album's release, Benito parted ways with the band and was replaced by Richardson in mid-2012.

In conjunction with a late-2012 American tour in support of A Gentle Reminder, The Jealous Sound released a split 7-inch recording (each band contributes material to one side of the vinyl record) with tour-mates Daytrader.

==== Rise records ====
In December 2012, the band announced that it had signed a deal with US-based label Rise Records. The Alternative Press (magazine) wrote, "They (Rise Records) will re-release their latest album, A Gentle Reminder, on February 5th, 2013. The new deluxe version will feature 4 bonus tracks including a new song and the 2008 Got Friends EP. The double vinyl LP version will include those as well as 2 remixes of the song “Got Friends” including one by Jimmy Tamborello of The Postal Service." The band also stated that it was planning to release its next full-length record in 2014.

==== Reflections from 2012 ====
Shehan provided an update of Benito's progress in the area of score composition on the band's Facebook fan page, stating, "Pedro wrote on the new record but left to pursue a career in film/tv music. He's doing really well in the field and keeps tabs on us though. He'll be stoked that people are checking up on him..."

On December 31, 2012, Shehan stated in a brief interview published by the Swimmingly website (an Internet resource identified by the tagline "A generation raised on the ideals of independent music is pioneering a new era in food culture."):

Quite a good chunk of 2012 was spent traveling America with three other grown men in a 15 passenger van. My dining choices at home in LA are spent at my usual spots, so when I"m on tour I enjoy heading out on my own for some quiet time and hopefully a great meal. It grounds me out and helps me reset from the daily grind of touring.

==== A Gentle Reminder reissue ====
The band's website revealed that the reissue of the second album, with Rise Records, consisted of "four previously unreleased songs, five new mixes, and a complete remaster." The release date for the reissued edition was February 5, 2013. The Rise Records website indicated the availability of a vinyl version of the reissued album, with 500 white and 1000 blue discs produced. A music video of the title track from the second album was released on the same date as the release date of the Rise reissue, and was published on the Rise Records YouTube channel. The video features the band in a woodland setting. New guitarist Richardson plays lead guitar in the video.

=== Third album ===
In January 2013, Shehan provided his perspective on the follow-up album to A Gentle Reminder:

It's time to get started. I realize that I have to plan for the future. I’m looking forward to making another record. Every record is an evolution but you try new things and you have new tools in your toolbox. If you’re inspired and you can match your new tools with inspiration, then that's great. There's nothing more depressing than making a bad record or listening to an uninspired record. And you can tell. It's pretty immediate. I don't want to make a record that feels that way ever. When inspiration meets artistic growth, it's great. I’m excited to see what that's like.

On March 28, 2017, the band announced that they were officially concluded and Blair Shehan and Bob Pen are forming a new band called Racquet Club with Sergie Loobkoff (Samiam, Knapsack) on guitar and Ian Smith on bass.

== Recognition ==
Andy Greenwald, of the Grantland Quarterly's podcast, Hollywood Prospectus, selected A Gentle Reminder for his "Best of 2012" list, while the Daytrotter live recording website selected the band's performance of "Hope For Us" in its 50 "Best Songs of 2012" list, at number six.

== Touring ==
According to the Songkick.com website, the Jealous Sound has completed 46 live performances since the band's inception; these shows have taken place in the United States.

The Jealous Sound announced a 19-date tour of the US in mid-2012 that would occur that September and October. Previous to this, the band had toured (again, only in the US) in late 2011 and in 2012.

In early August 2012, a Montreal, Canada show was announced; his was the only Canadian show that the band would undertake as part of its North American tour with support band Daytrader.

In November 2012, the band was announced as one of the two support acts on the "Winter Headline Tour 2013" of American band Balance and Composure, with Daylight as the other support act. The domestic American tour was to span from January 2013 to February 2013, with cities such as Pembroke Pines, Florida; Hamden, Connecticut; and Cleveland, Ohio selected as performance locations. On March 28, 2017, the band announced that they were officially finished, with Blair Shehan and Bob Penn forming a new band called Racquet Club.

=== In-studio concert performances ===
The band recorded two in-studio concert performances following the release of A Gentle Reminder — one for the Daytrotter company, in April 2012, and one for the Audiotree company, in February 2013. Both companies are based in the American state of Illinois, with Daytrotter in Rock Island and Audiotree in Chicago. Sean Moeller, writing for the Daytrotter website, provided an accompanying article to the Jealous Sound's session:

Shehan finds his pain riveting and it's easy to see why. None of the pain that he lends to his Los Angeles-based band is one-dimensional. It's all things to all different people. It's agony and it's euphoria. He howls directly at the anguish, as if he were howling directly at the moon, looking for any way to deaden it, or lessen it, to pry away its grip, just a little bit.

== Management ==
The band is managed by Tom Ackerman (formerly of Sunday's Best) of Street Smart Management.

== Discography ==
- The Jealous Sound EP (2000, Better Looking Records)
- Kill Them With Kindness LP (2003, Better Looking Records)
- Got Friends EP (2008, The Militia Group)
- A Gentle Reminder LP (2012, Music Is Subjective/INgrooves)
- The Jealous Sound/Daytrader split 7-inch (released by Rise, the recording coincided with a joint tour by the two bands)

== Videography ==
- "Bitter Strings": From The Jealous Sound (EP) (2001)
- "The Fold Out": From Kill Them With Kindness (2003), directed by Nate Weaver
- "A Gentle Reminder": From A Gentle Reminder (2013), directed by Nate Weaver

== See also ==
- Independent music
- Post-punk
- Music of California
- Music of the United States
