= A Gentle Reminder =

Studio album by The Jealous Sound
- Released: January 31, 2012
- Genre: Indie rock
- Length: 44:30
- Label: Rise Records
- Producer: John Lousteau

The Jealous Sound chronology
Kill Them with Kindness (2003)	A Gentle Reminder (2012)

A Gentle Reminder is the second full-length album from American indie rock band, The Jealous Sound. Released after a long hiatus, the recording is the band's second full-length album and followed the 2003 debut album, Kill Them with Kindness.

== Reissue ==
Following the band's move to the roster of Rise Records, an independent record label based in Portland, Oregon, United States (US), a reissue of the album was released on February 5, 2013. The "Deluxe" version features "four previously unreleased songs, five new mixes, and a complete remaster", and was produced in vinyl form (500 white-colored and 1000 blue-colored discs).

== Track listing ==
1. "Beautiful Morning" - 3:26
2. "Change You" - 4:51
3. "Promise of the West" - 4:18
4. "Your Eyes Were Shining" - 4:43
5. "This Is Where It Starts" - 3:59
6. "Here Comes the Ride" - 5:26
7. "Equilibrium" - 3:52
8. "Perfect Timing" - 4:38
9. "A Gentle Reminder" - 4:46
10. "Waiting for Your Arrival" - 4:38

=== Reissue ===
1. "Beautiful Morning" - 3:26
2. "Change You" - 4:51
3. "Promise of the West" - 4:18
4. "Your Eyes Were Shining" - 4:43
5. "This Is Where It Starts" - 3:59
6. "Here Comes The Ride" - 5:26
7. "Equilibrium" - 3:52
8. "Perfect Timing" - 4:38
9. "A Gentle Reminder" - 4:46
10. "Waiting for Your Arrival" - 4:38
11. "Full Rewind" - 3:22
12. "Got Friends?" - 3:25
13. "Broad Shoulders" - 5:02
14. "Turning Around" - 3:58

== See also ==
- Independent music
- Post-punk
- Music of California
- Music of Oregon
