= Sun Yuan & Peng Yu =

Chinese conceptual artists

Sun Yuan (born 1972) and Peng Yu (born 1974) are Chinese conceptual artists whose work has a reputation for being confrontational and provocative. They have lived and worked collaboratively in Beijing since the late 1990s.

In 2001, they won the Contemporary Chinese Art Award. They create pieces that dive deep into human nature, psychological, and political experiences. They are well known for utilising controversial materials such as live animals, and human cadavers.

== Early life and education ==
Sun Yuan was born in Beijing, China in 1972 and Peng Yu was born in Heilongjiang, China in 1974. The two met each other while attending at the Central Academy of Fine Arts in Beijing, where they both studied oil painting.

== Career ==
After completing their studies in the 1990s, Sun Yuan and Peng Yu had short solo careers that set an artistic foundation for their partnership in the early 2000s. The two began making "non-normative and unconventional art" in the 2000s.

== Personal life ==
They were married in 2000.

== Work ==
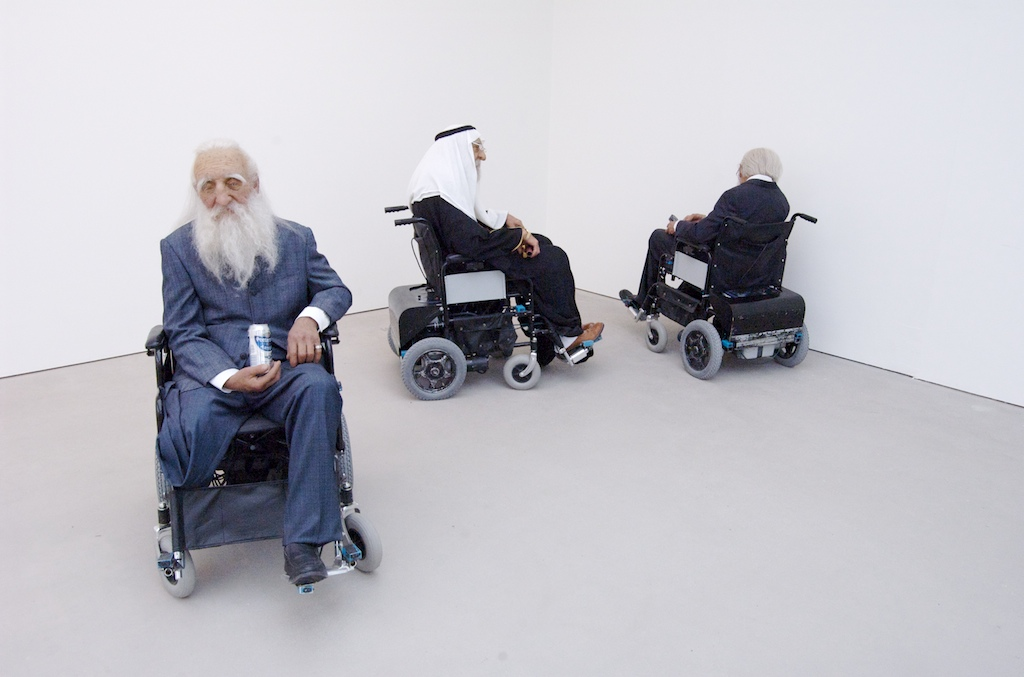
Old Persons Home by Sun Yuan & Peng Yu, Saatchi Gallery, London

Sun Yuan & Peng Yu have created Kinetic art and Installation art pieces that work to incorporate unconventional and organic materials into artworks and create "statement" pieces about the current systems of political and social authority. These materials include taxidermy, human cadavers, live animals, and machinery. They have utilized technology and multi media art to "comment critically on the modern understanding and exercise of political constructs like the nation-state, sovereign territory, freedom, and democracy."

In 1999, the couple contributed to the exhibition, Post-Sense Sensibility: Alien Bodies and Delusion, curated by Qiu Zhijie and Wu Meichun. Their piece, entitled Honey, featured the face of an elderly man, embedded in a bed of dry ice, with a curled up foetus next to it. Both these bodies were not sculptural works, instead cadavers were utilised.

For the 2005 Venice Biennale, the duo invited Chinese farmer Du Wenda to present his homemade UFO at the Chinese Pavilion.

The 2008 installation Old People's Home, comprised 13 hyperrealistic sculptures of elderly world leaders, including Yasser Arafat and Leonid Brezhnev, in electric wheelchairs set to automatically wander through the room and bump into one another.

Angel (2008), was a fibreglass angel sculpture complete with flesh-covered wings, white hair, and frighteningly realistic skin that featured details like wrinkles, sunspots, and peach fuzz.

Their 2009 solo exhibition, Freedom, at Tang Contemporary in Beijing, featured a large firehose hooked to a chain that erupted water spray at a distance of 120 meters and thrashed throughout an enormous metal cage.

Their 2016 work, Can’t Help Myself was commissioned for the Guggenheim Museum and displayed as part of their Tales of Our Time exhibition. The work consisted of a large KUKA industrial robot with a robotic arm and visual sensors behind clear acrylic walls. The robot was programmed to endlessly attempt to sweep red, viscous, blood-like liquid into a circle around its base, in the process spreading and splattering the "blood." It was also programmed with thirty-two "dance moves" and reacted to people around it. These "dance moves" became more "depressed" and erratic as time went on, and eventually stopped operating in 2019. Can't Help Myself was also displayed in the 2019 Venice Biennale's main exhibition, "May You Live in Interesting Times."

In the controversial Dogs That Cannot Touch Each Other, eight dogs (four pairs facing one another) were strapped onto treadmills in a public installation. It used living dogs for performance as part of the art. It was purposely provocative, and organizations such as PETA criticized the piece. This was part of the exhibition “Art and China after 1989: Theater of the World”. The Guggenheim later released a statement, explaining the artist’s intentions. This piece was eventually removed from the Guggenheim’s digital archive.

== Selected exhibitions ==
1997

- Counter-Perspectives: The Environment & Us, Beijing
- Inside, Tongdao Gallery Central Academy of Fine Arts, Beijing

1999

- Post-Sense Sensibility Alien Bodies & Delusion (Basement), Beijing

2000

- Indulge in Hurt, Sculpture Research Fellow of Central Academy of Fine Arts, Beijing
- 5th Biennale of Lyon, Lyon Museum of Contemporary Art, Lyon, France
- Fuck Off!, Donglang Gallery, Shanghai

2001

- Get Out of Control, Berlin, Germany
- Yokohama 2001 International Triennial of Contemporary Art, Yokohama, Japan
- Winner: The Contemporary Chinese Art Award of CCAA, Beijing

2002

- The First Guangzhou Triennial, Guangzhou Art Museum, Guangzhou, China

2003

- Second-Hand Reality: Post-Reality, Today Art Museum, Beijing, China
- Left Wing, Beijing
- Return to Nature, Shenghua Arts Centre, Nanjing, China

2004

- Ghent Spring, Contemporary Art Financial Award, Ghent, Belgium (solo)
- Between Past and Future: New Photography and Video From China, Seattle Art Museum, Seattle, USA
- Australia: Asia Traffic, Asia-Australia Arts Centre
- The Virtue and the Vice: le Moine et le Demon, Museum of Contemporary Art, Lyon, France
- All Under Heaven: Ancient and Contemporary Chinese Art, The Collection of the Guy and Myriam Ullens Foundation, MuHKA Museum of Contemporary Art, Antwerp, Belgium
- What is Art?, Shanxi Art Museum, Xi’an, China
- Australia - Asia Traffic, Asia-Australia Arts Centre, Australia
- Gwangju Biennale, Gwangju, Korea

2005

- Higher, F2 Gallery, Beijing, China (solo)
- Mahjong: Chinese Contemporary Art from Uli Sigg Collection, Art Museum Bern, Switzerland
- The 51st Venice Biennale (China Pavilion), Venice
- To Each His Own, Zero Art Space, Beijing
- Ten Thousand Years Post-Contemporary City, Beijing

2006

- Liverpool Biennial, Tang Contemporary Art, Liverpool, UK

2009

- Unveiled: New Art From The Middle East, Saatchi Gallery, London, UK

2016

- Tales of Our Time, Guggenheim Museum, NY
