= Mickey Slim =

Claimed cocktail combining gin and DDT

- Type: Cocktail
- Ingredients: One part gin; A pinch of DDT
- Base spirit: Gin
- Preparation: Stir the DDT into the gin and serve

The Mickey Slim was a drink claimed to have been consumed by some in the United States in the 1940s or 1950s. According to the 2001 book The Dedalus Book of Absinthe, it was made by combining gin with a pinch of DDT (dichlorodiphenyltrichloroethane), an insecticide that would later be banned in most countries; consumers of this concoction reportedly claimed that its effects were similar to absinthe.

Due to a lack of documentary evidence, it has been questioned whether this is a modern urban legend rather than a historical reality. As of January 2023, the earliest reference on Newspapers.com to the drink is in the television listing for a 1992 episode of Pandora's Box, a BBC documentary series.

This beverage should not be confused with the knockout drink known as the Mickey Finn.

== Effects of consumption of DDT by humans ==
In a 2009 study, DDT was linked to various health problems in humans. However, the negative health effects on humans have not always been apparent. Time Magazine, reported on August 1, 1971, that Pest Control Executive Robert Loibl and his wife Louise start breakfast with a 10 mg capsule of DDT to demonstrate its safety, doing so for three months in front of witnesses. The well-known British entomologist Kenneth Mellanby often ate small amounts of DDT during his 40 years of lectures. On p. 75 of his 1992 book The DDT Story, Mellanby famously wrote:

[The] consumption of smaller doses in the milligram range appears to be quite harmless. I know that I myself, when lecturing about DDT during the years immediately after World War II, frequently consumed a substantial pinch of DDT, to the consternation of the audience, but with no apparent harm to myself, either then or during the next 40 years.

The entomologist Gordon Edwards also frequently demonstrated DDT consumption, and he appeared in the September 1971 edition of Esquire magazine doing so. None of them reported any psychoactive effects of their consumption of DDT.

There have been no reports of this tasteless chemical having any psychoactive effects. The comparison to absinthe basically does not indicate any effect at all (aside from that of the alcohol in the cocktail), since the assumed psychedelic effect of absinthe, that is, the effect of the chemical thujone, has in recent times been revealed to be close to non-existent.

== See also ==
- List of cocktails
