= Flanders (band) =

Italian musical group

- Also known as: Deflect, Suite 117
- Origin: Gela, Italy
- Genres: Dance, Electronica, House, Alternative
- Years active: 2005 - present
- Members: Giuliana Fraglica; Marco Giudice; Francesco Abbate; Alessandro Bunetto

Flanders is a Dance/Electronica/House/Alternative quartet based out of Italy. The act also records under the name Deflect and Suite 117. The group consists of DJs Francesco Abbate and Alessandro Bunetto, bassist Marco Giudice, and female singer Giuliana Fraglica.

In 2005 the group recorded a track called "By My Side," which has taken on a life of its own. The single, produced by Vincenzo Callea & Danilo Rispoli, has already topped the DMC (UK) Dance charts in 2006 and has been championed by DJs and clubland across the globe. The track has elements similar to that of Michael Moog's 1999 track "That Sound."

The act returned in 2008 with their follow-up, "Behind," which reached number one on Billboard's US Hot Dance Airplay chart in December 2008. They hit the Dance Airplay Chart again in March 2010 with "Time", which peaked at #2.

== Singles ==
- By My Side (2005) #4 Hot Dance Airplay
- Behind (2008) #1 Hot Dance Airplay
- Time (2009) #2 Hot Dance Airplay
- Late (2012)
