= Kill Them with Kindness (The Jealous Sound album) =

Studio album by The Jealous Sound
- Released: June 3, 2003
- Genre: Emo
- Length: 47:32
- Label: Better Looking Records

The Jealous Sound chronology
Kill Them with Kindness (2003)	A Gentle Reminder (2012)

Professional ratings
Aggregate scores
Source	Rating
Metacritic	77/100
Review scores
Source	Rating
Allmusic	4/5 stars
The A.V. Club	(not rated)
Pitchfork	6.8
Spin	positive
Punknews.org	3.5/5 stars

Kill Them with Kindness is the first studio album by the Los Angeles–based indie rock band The Jealous Sound. It was placed 31st on Rolling Stone's "40 Greatest Emo Albums of All Time" list.

== Track listing ==
1. "Hope for Us" – 4:10
2. "Naive" – 2:58
3. "Anxious Arms" – 4:59
4. "The Fold Out" – 3:10
5. "The Gift Horse" – 3:39
6. "Does That Make Sense" – 2:54
7. "Guard It Closely" – 3:51
8. "For Once in Your Life" – 3:47
9. "Abandon! Abandon!" – 3:37
10. "Troublesome" – 3:30
11. "Recovery Room" – 6:10
12. "Above the Waves" – 4:47
