= I Can't Help Myself (Bellatrax song) =

Single by Bellatrax featuring Sophia May
- Released: 2008
- Recorded: 2007
- Genre: Dance/house
- Length: 3:30
- Label: Nervous Records
- Songwriter(s): Chris Dececio; Bruce Elliott-Smith; Sophia Hurst; Steph Mazzacani
- Producer(s): Chris Dececio; Steph Mazzacani

Bellatrax singles chronology
"I Can't Help Myself" (2008)	"Don't Hold Back" (2009)

"I Can't Help Myself" is a debut single released in 2008 recorded and co-produced by British remixer/producer Chris Dececio under his project name Bellatrax (with collaborators Bruce Elliott-Smith and Italian producer Steph Mazzacani) featuring fellow British vocalist/songwriter Sophia May (née Hurst). The Electronic/House-infused track reached number one on Billboard's Dance/Mix Show Airplay Chart in 2008, and was the only American release for the artists as well as the first number one single on this chart for the American label Nervous Records.
