= Can't Help Myself (Sun Yuan and Peng Yu) =

Kinetic sculpture by Sun Yuan and Peng Yu

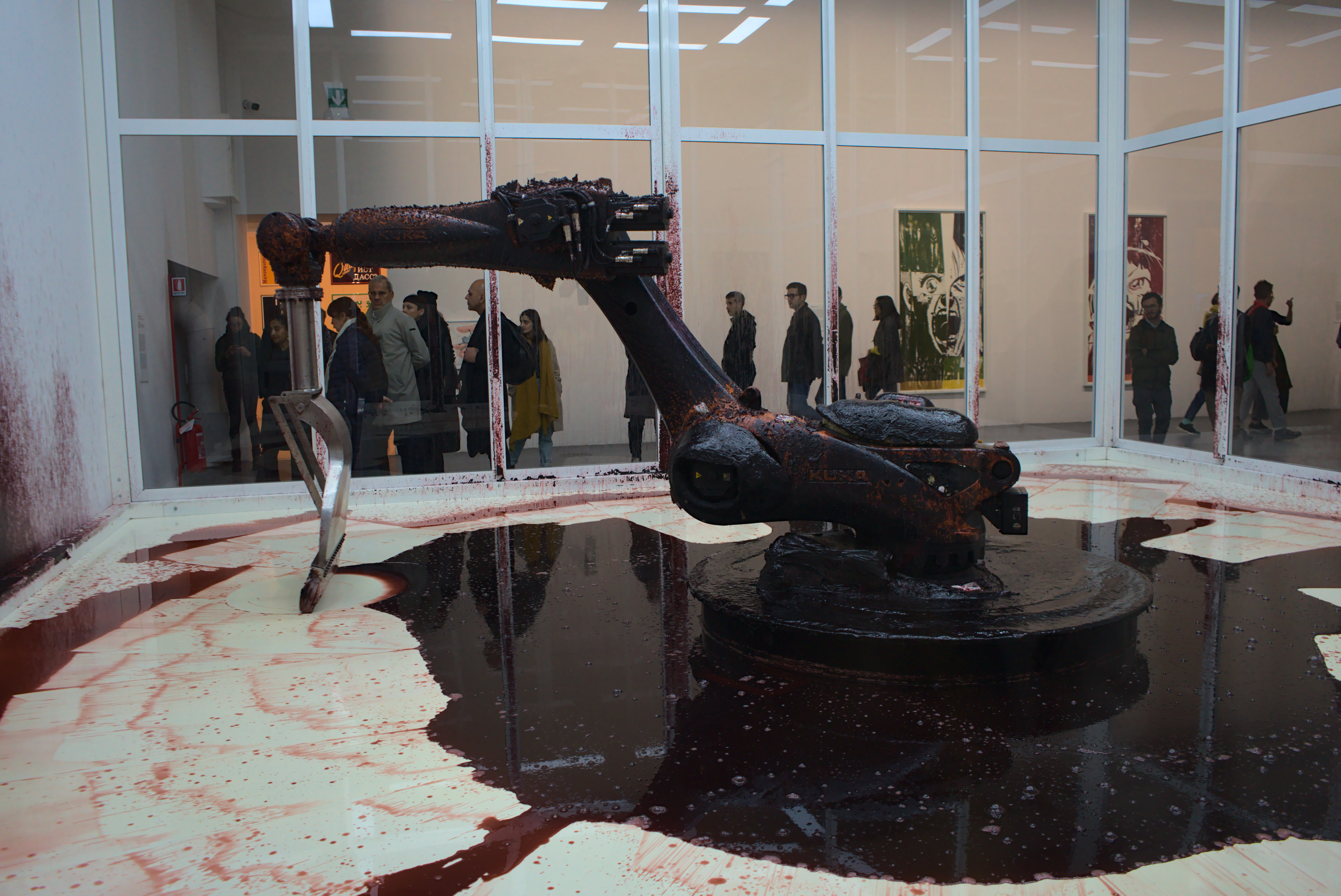
- Artists: Sun Yuan and Peng Yu
- Year: 2016–2019
- Medium: "Kuka industrial robot, stainless steel and rubber, cellulose ether in colored water, lighting grid with Cognex visual-recognition sensors, and polycarbonate wall with aluminum frame"
- Dimensions: Variable overall
- Location: Solomon R. Guggenheim Museum, New York, New York
- Accession: 2016.40
- Website: https://www.guggenheim.org/artwork/34812

Can't Help Myself was a kinetic sculpture created by Sun Yuan and Peng Yu in 2016. The sculpture consisted of a robotic arm that could move to sweep up red cellulose ether fluid leaking from its inner core, and make dance-like movements. It was commissioned by The Guggenheim as part of The Robert H.N. Family Foundation Chinese Art Initiative led by The Robert H.N. Ho Family Foundation Associate Curator Xiaoyu Weng, with the intent of cultivating dialogue about the advancement of technology and industrialization, violent border control, and allusions to the nature of life.

The sculpture was displayed at the Guggenheim Museum as part of the exhibition Tales of Our Time in 2016, curated by Xiaoyu Weng and Hou Hanru, and subsequently at the Venice Biennale in 2019 for the May You Live in Interesting Times exhibition. Each display elicited various audience interpretations.

== Description ==
When Can't Help Myself was created, it was programmed to perform for its spectators. The robotic arm was made to dance, and had 32 unique dance moves, such as "ass shake", "scratch an itch", and "bow and shake". These dances functioned as technical representations of the artists' machine animation skills as well as the artists' desire to anthropomorphize the sculpture and parallel its existence to that of a human. The dances themselves served the purpose of eliciting an emotional response from the viewer and grasping their attention. The programmed dances would have looked familiar to the audience, giving Can't Help Myself a humanistic quality that is unavoidable. The robot also would have interacted with viewers through "waving" or even doing "jazz hands", committing their attention to the sculpture. Furthermore, this dancing quality simultaneously shifts the audience perspective of the sculpture as an object to understanding the sculpture as an extension of humanity or something living.

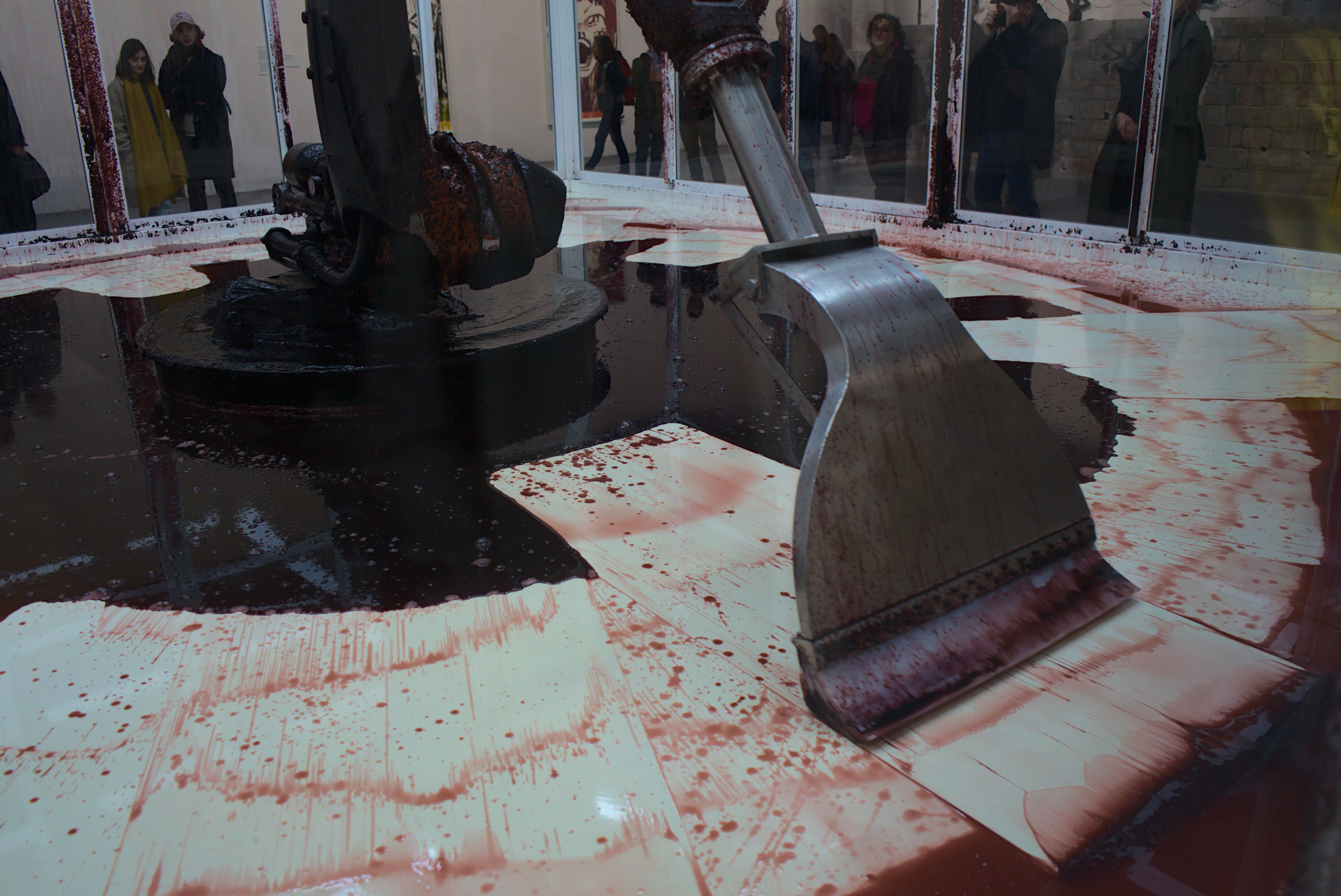
The robotic arm of Can't Help Myself sweeping up the spill of cellulose ether fluid towards its core

The functional purpose of the moving robotic arm in Can't Help Myself spans much further than its interactive dance moves and crowd engagement. The duty of the robotic arm is to sweep up the dark-red cellulose ether fluid that seeps out from its inner core, something that was thought as necessary to maintain its functionality. The 4 GigE Cognex industrial cameras, placed above the sculpture, alert the robotic arm to move to an area of spillage and squeegee said fluid back to its center. As time proceeded the spillage became larger and became harder for the robotic arm to manage. This shifted the life trajectory of the robot from dancing and entertaining its viewers to constantly working to fulfill its programmed duty. The responsibilities of the sculptures have been equated to the participation in a Sisyphean task, a task that will never be fully completed, by the artists and curators alike. The endless sweeping of the fluid to the inner core of the sculpture was artistically intended to be absurd, laborious, and eerily satisfying. The audience surveying the repetitive duty of the robot keeps them engaged in the piece and encourages them to contemplate its meaning and significance. Furthermore, the repeated duty of Can't Help Myself gives it a sense of consciousness as a life-form, one that has been captured, confined, and subject to a task in a given space.

Two years after the completion of Can't Help Myself, Yuan and Yu decided to turn off the robot in 2019. The robot's shutoff was not due to hydraulics or the loss of too much fluid, as Can't Help Myself was completely programmed, ran on electricity, and powered off every night by museum staff. The hydraulics of the kinetic sculpture was only a component of the piece to make a statement and not an integral part of its functionality. The artwork was programmed to perpetually squeegee the "blood-like" fluid seeping from its inner core, as a Sisyphean task rather than a life necessity.

== Creation ==
Sun Yuan and Peng Yu are an artistic duo that began making non-normative and unconventional art in the 2000s. Can't Help Myself is one of their many pieces of kinetic art throughout their career with increasing media attention. It is a kinetic sculpture made from a mobile robotic arm. The idea of using a robot as the main object of focus in Can't Help Myself stemmed from the artists' desires to relinquish their "artistic will" or "artistic genius" and replace it with something mechanical or programmed, alluding to the meaning of the artwork. The ultimate goal of Yuan and Yu's Can't Help Myself is to evoke powerful physical, emotional, and psychological responses from their audience and prompt them to scrutinize the socio-political systems that plague today's society, such as industrial violence at the border.

Can't Help Myself was created with immense planning as well as consideration of the audience shock factor, a signature characteristic of Sun Yuan and Peng Yu's collaborative projects. The kinetic sculpture was created using a Kuka (KUKA model Kr180 R3100 K) industrial robot arm made of stainless steel with an exterior black coating. The arm was modified by the addition of a shovel and a rubber squeegee at its end. The arm functioned at a 360 degree radius and had full mobility through a programmable Kuka controller. The sculpture itself was powered by a high-voltage cable connected to the base of the robot. A hydraulic component was installed at its center, and consisted of 48 gallons of cellulose ether and dark-red colored water that would seep from the center of the sculpture.

The robot was installed on a 7m x 7m white, wooden, waterproofed platform with room for wiring underneath. Aside from the platform, Can't Help Myself was surrounded by floor-to-ceiling clear polycarbonate panels that would prevent spillage and protect the piece. Within the installation space there were 18 LED lights and 4 GigE Cognex industrial cameras placed in a grid on the ceiling. The cameras were programmed to the Kuka controller to serve as a visual recognition system that detected the movement of the red, bloodlike liquid. This resulted in the arm’s recognition of an area of spillage, move towards it, and consequential squeegeeing of the liquid toward the robot's base. The Kuka robot was also programmed to perform 32 distinct dances when not sent to squeegee different areas of the raised platform.

The automated nature of Can't Help Myself categorizes the sculpture as a work of kinetic art, which, in turn, generates an anthropomorphic quality to the robotic arm. This anthropomorphism partially is because of the robotics performative nature and completion of the human task of cleaning up a spillage. In addition, the spectators enter an emotional phase of connection with the artwork, followed by in intellectual phase where the audience works to understand the origins and significance of the motion, another quality of kinetic art. Can't Help Myself was created with the intent of generating both an emotional and intellectual response from viewers and takes up the human task of representing the violence and terror at the border. Furthermore, Can't Help Myself is a physical manifestation of metaphysical ideas which directly elicits a human emotional response from the audience, as kinetic art should do.

== Exhibitions ==
=== Solomon R. Guggenheim: Tales of Our Time ===
Can't Help Myself was created in 2016 and commissioned by the Robert H.N. Ho family collection for display at the Solomon R. Guggenheim Museum in New York City. The artwork was intended to be displayed as a part of an exhibition that called attention to Chinese artists with an emphasis on displaying cultural and historical hidden narratives titled Tales of Our Time. The name of the exhibition is a play on the title of a book, Gushi xin bian, by a modern Chinese literary Lu Xun, which comments on society and contemporary issues by retelling relevant ancient Chinese legends. The exhibit itself serves as a cohesive group of art pieces that deconstruct the fabrications of the past and reveal the present for its true nature. This exhibit was curated by Xiaoyu Weng with the intention of being politically polarized and creating a dialogue about migration and borders in China. Tales of Our Time ran from November 4, 2016 to March 10, 2017. With its purpose of eliciting unknown cultural and historical narratives as well as challenging the "conventional understanding of place", Can't Help Myself was created as Sun Yuan and Peng Yu's representation of geography and the nation state. The presence of Can't Help Myself as a kinetic sculpture in this exhibit speaks to its role of promote awareness to industrialized brutality on the Asian borders as well as the migration crisis in China. This artwork along with the others in the exhibition represent an artistic effort of contributing to the globalization of art via combating nationalism and intersecting art and traditional storytelling.

=== Venice Biennale: May You Live in Interesting Times ===
After its display at the Guggenheim, Can't Help Myself was displayed at the 2019 Venice Biennale for its 58th anniversary. The Venice Biennale's 58th exhibition, titled May You Live in Interesting Times, was curated by Ralph Rugoff and ran from May 11, 2019 to November 24, 2019.

The expression "interesting times" was utilized by the Venice Biennale to represent the "menacing times" of sociopolitical polarization and "oversimplification of controversial topics". The exhibit was to bring awareness to global crises such as nationalism, threats to traditions and institutions, and controversial relationships in a "post-war" and highly combated world. The works present in May You Live in Interesting Times were to serve as demonstrations of art's social function, challenge existing habits, and expose multiple perspectives on controversial issues.

The exhibition itself was split into two propositions: Proposition A and Proposition B, which each include one artwork from the same group of artists, each piece being vastly different and utilizing different mediums. In general, Proposition A was more primitive in subject and had archaic displays, whereas Proposition B represented a shift toward modernity and industrialization. This allows for each artist to display an alternative presentation of their perspective of global politics. Can't Help Myself was displayed in the Central Pavilion within Proposition B and served as a testament to Sun Yuan and Peng Yu's perspective of technology's effect on politics and the maintenance of geopolitical borders. Can't Help Myself tells the story of the political "other" through using industrialization to emphasize this narrative. The kinetic sculpture is a manifestation of a sentient form of life captured in a cage and put on display and confined to do a Sisyphean task because of technology and industrial programming.

== Interpretations ==
Can't Help Myself is a modern artist interpretation of technology at the border and the violence that it has caused. Firstly, the cameras present above the sculpture are method of activation for a machine that elicits a response once something or someone passes a certain point of restriction or no return. The blood-like substance, although useless for the functionality for the object itself, is a testament to the bloodshed that spills out from industrialization and technological violence at geopolitical borders of China and across the globe. The Sisyphean task of cleaning up the spillage is a reference to border technology's sole purpose of causing bloodshed and restricting migrants from passing a specific point. However the constant spillage represents the human impulsive behavior of seeping out of the core for outward movement in uncharted territory. The dancing of the machine is purposeful as it convolutes Can't Help Myself's identity as both a robot, but as a human, exposing its vulnerabilities. This anthropomorphic quality raises questions about the separation of man from machine and causes the audience to question if the makers of the machine or the machine itself has true control over its actions. The piece is a testament to increasing machine intelligence and the controversies of surveillance culture. Curator Xiaoyu Weng states "Humans are unaware that the machines and programs created for surveillance result in them becoming subject to mechanic monitoring and controlling of behavior", which summarizes the further implications of Can't Help Myself. Lastly, the artists' unplugging the sculpture is their metaphorical way of advising political officials to put an end to the technological violence at nation borders and encouraging people to break away from monotony and allow them to branch out of their preordained, enclosed spaces.

== Legacy ==
Can't Help Myself gained public attention starting in 2023 because of social media networks like TikTok and Instagram; however, its audience perception has changed. Social media framing as well as commentary on posts have highlighted the anthropomorphic quality of the sculpture where people feel as though it is a "relatable robot" and state "no piece of art has emotionally affected me this way". The interpretation of the robot has altered from its intended meaning and has been increasingly associated as an allegory about life and the idea of working to live. The most common interpretation is that the hydraulic fluid is lost "blood" from the robot and is squeegeed back to the center because the robot needs it to live. The Sisyphean nature of the sculpture has caused its audience to resonate with Can't Help Myself as a reflection on people's constant suffering that comes with repetitively doing work to maintain themselves and their lifestyles. The death of the robot elicits many feelings from its current audience, but recent interpretations revolve around the idea that regardless if people do their due diligence to sustain themselves, there is always a higher preceding power that has other plans. This suffering, as seen in the sculpture, is perpetual and never ends until it becomes the source of human's death and demise as they work their entire life to keep themselves from "spilling" and falling apart.
