= Madame X (2021 film) =

2021 documentary concert film

- Directed by: Ricardo Gomes; SKNX
- Written by: Madonna
- Based on: Madame X by Madonna
- Produced by: Madonna; Guy Oseary; Arthur Fogel; Sara Zambreno
- Starring: Madonna
- Edited by: Nuno Xico; Sasha Kasiuha
- Production company: MTV Entertainment Studios
- Distributed by: Paramount+
- Release date: September 23, 2021
- Running time: 117 minutes
- Language: English

Madame X is a 2021 concert film starring American singer-songwriter Madonna, chronicling her Madame X Tour. Written and produced by Madonna herself, the film was shot in January 2020 when she held her concerts in Lisbon, Portugal at the Coliseu dos Recreios. The film was directed by Ricardo Gomes and SKNX (Sasha Kasiuha and Nuno Xico).

The film's official premiere was held on September 23, 2021, at the Paradise Club on top of the Times Square Edition hotel in New York City. It was released on October 8, 2021, on Paramount+, and MTV in regions where Paramount+ is unavailable. An accompanying live album was released on the same day as the film. Critical response to Madame X film was generally positive, with many reviewers praising its visuals.

== Concert synopsis ==
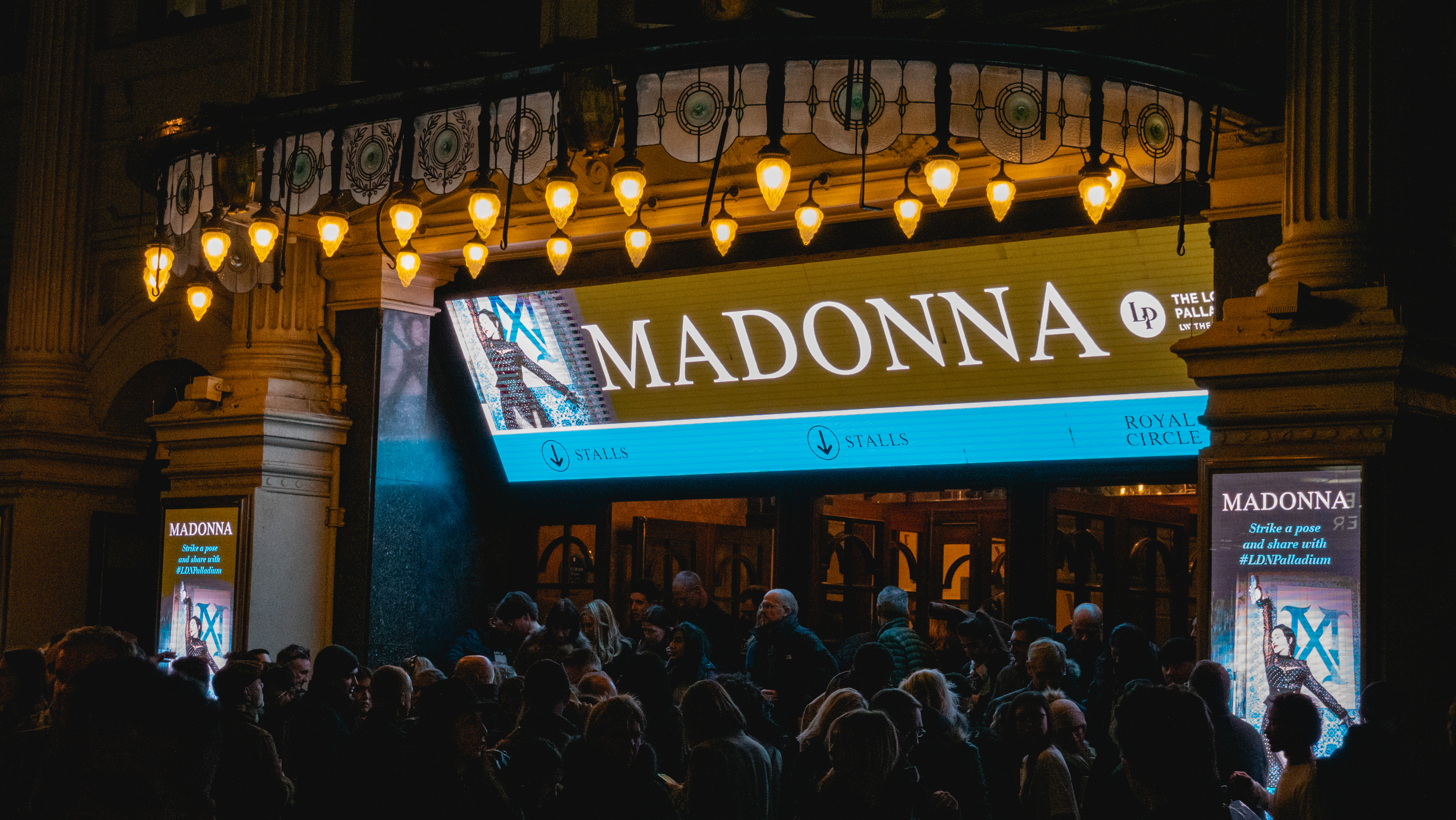
Madame X Tour at London Palladium

The introduction features a montage of newspaper articles and shots from Madonna's music videos, showing her fight against misogyny, sexism, ageism, bigotry, racism, and promoting feminism and artistic liberation. This is done to the backdrop of Honey Dijon's remix of "I Don't Search I Find". The official show begins with a quote by James Baldwin: "Art is here to prove that all safety is an illusion... Artists are here to disturb the peace." Then, a silhouetted woman sits at a typewriter; each key press sounding like a gunshot, accompanied by a dancer jerking and flinching as if he has been shot. Madonna then appears to sing "God Control" while being bounced between two police officers’ shields. The number has cops attacking dancers under a video montage of news footage. "Dark Ballet" is performed next, with Joan of Arc references and the singer fighting dancers in gas masks reminiscent of the mice in The Nutcracker (1892); it counted with a ballet breakdown halfway through. Afterwards, Madonna yells "Fuck the patriarchy!" before being dragged by dancers dressed as policemen into a circular cell in the stage. This leads into a rendition of "Human Nature", as pointing fingers are projected across the stage. Towards the end, she plays a bongo solo and was surrounded by 11 black women − including her daughters Stella, Estere, and Mercy James − and chanting the phrase "I'm not your bitch!" An a capella rendition of "Express Yourself" and a brief interlude where Madonna addresses the audience follows. Madonna and her daughters make reference to the possibility of God being a woman, the MeToo and Time's Up movements. Madonna then has a costume change behind some vanity mirrors with two of her dancers dressed in trench coats, sunglasses and blowing their fans wait for her. Meanwhile, she makes comedic jokes with the crowd including Mozart's music coming out of her vagina and poking fun at her age.

"Vogue" and "I Don't Search I Find" are performed with lookalike dancers dressed in blonde wigs, trench coats, shades, and high heels. Afterwards, she played guitar for "American Life" while uniforms fell down from above the stage, and dancers dressed as soldiers dragged a coffin. Madonna then wears a faux fur coat and takes selfies using a polaroid camera. Shots are shown across multiple shows whereby fans donate money for the pictures, which goes to her charity Raising Malawi. "Batuka" has 14 women of the Batukadeiras Orchestra playing the drums while Madonna sits to the side on a stairwell before eventually joining them and doing batuque moves. Following this, Isabel De Oliveira's "Fado Pechincha", and Madame X album tracks "Killers Who are Partying" and "Crazy" – the last one was played with an accordion. A cha-cha-chá mashup of "La Isla Bonita" and a new song called "Welcome to My Fado Club" is performed next, with elements of Cesária Évora's "Sodade". The next numbers were "Medellín", with Maluma appearing on the backdrop screens, and album track "Extreme Occident". Within the Medellin performance, her son David Banda joins her to form a conga line within the theatre. Following that she interacts further with the crowd including comedian Dave Chappelle who praises Madonna for being a revolutionary. An interlude of dancers doing synchronized moves to lyrics of "Rescue Me" follows.

"Frozen" sees the singer performing in the middle of a massive projection of the video of her daughter Lourdes. For "Come Alive", Madonna and the dancers wear colorful flowing robes. The film features shots from her 2018 holiday to Morocco with her family. She then plays the piano for "Future" and is joined by dancers with red lights on their eyes; the word "Warning" flashes on the stage behind her as she sings. "Like a Prayer" has her performing in front of an X-shaped staircase while surrounded by a choir and the song's music video projected on the stage. The final number, "I Rise", begins with elements from her speech from the 2019 GLAAD awards, and the video interlude shows news footage of protests and marches, from her 2019 music video for the song with Times magazine. Halfway through, the screen turned the colors of the Rainbow flag as Madonna and her dancers left the stage with their fists raised.

== Production ==
Madonna released her fourteenth studio album, Madame X, in 2019, while she was living in Lisbon, Portugal. She was inspired to write the album after frequently getting invited to "living room sessions" with local musicians playing fado, morna, and samba music. She also brought these musicians to the stage of the Madame X Tour, an all-theatre concert tour to promote the album. The tour was held in ten cities across North America and Europe, between September 17, 2019, and March 8, 2020, and earned $51.4 million in ticket sales.

On January 12, 2020, Lisbon-based production service company Krypton International posted, via their official Instagram account, a picture of an "All Stage Access Pass" for the Lisbon tour evening happening that day, followed by the information that they were shooting and recording that concert. During February 2021, after months of teasing the editing process from her home, Madonna re-shot specific elements of the show for the film. On April 14, 2021, she posted on her official Facebook account that a private screening of Madame X had been held at a 500-seat theatre.

== Release and promotion ==
The film was projected at three exclusive screening events, on October 8 at Le Grand Rex in Paris, on October 9 at NiteOwl Drive-In in Miami and on October 10 at TCL Chinese Theatre in Los Angeles. On October 8, Madonna appeared during The Tonight Show Starring Jimmy Fallon to promote the film. She made a surprise performance in Harlem singing "Dark Ballet", "Crazy", "Sodade" and "La Isla Bonita" at The Red Rooster, and later walked down the streets singing "Like a Prayer" in front of the St. Andrew's Episcopal Church along with Jon Batiste and a little choir.

On October 22, 2021, Madonna uploaded a teaser on Instagram from the Q&A session from the film's premiere. The recording of the Q&A session is directed by SKNX (Sasha Kasiuha and Nuno Xico) and was released on Paramount+ on November 18, 2021. The discussion was assisted by RuPaul's Drag Race winners Symone and Aquaria. On October 28, 2021, Madonna went on to tease a list of artists who submitted a question to her including, Lil Wayne, Billie Eilish, Doja Cat, Amy Schumer, Katy Perry, Kim Kardashian, Snoop Dogg, FKA Twigs, Jeremy Scott, Lil Nas X, Ariana Grande, and Jimmy Fallon.

== Reception ==
Madame X received generally positive reviews from critics. On review aggregator Rotten Tomatoes, Madame X has an approval rating of 67%, based on 6 reviews from critics. At Metacritic, which assigns a weighted average rating, the film has received an average score of 62 out of 100, based on 4 critics, indicating "generally favorable reviews". Mick LaSalle from San Francisco Chronicle praised the film for Madonna's ability to reimagine herself and come up with new ideas, and described it as "somewhere between a success and a triumph". Nick Levine from NME gave the concert film four out of five stars, stating: "Feels like an opportunity to end the experience on a positive and empowered note".

Alexis Petridis of The Guardian gave the concert film three out of five stars describing it as a "fascinating behind-the-scenes documentary" and "beautifully shot". In his review, Petridis also asserts "the staging is impressive and wilfully arty". John DeFore from The Hollywood Reporter praised its visual variety, but described the setlist as "weighted toward lesser material". Writing for USA Today, Melissa Ruggieri reported that Madame X "is artistically impressive but often confounding". Johnny Loftus from Decider opined that "the creative scope of Madame X is its most impressive thing" that "mixes high-concept [and] artfully constructed performance". In a negative review, Owen Gleiberman from Variety criticized the film's serious tone and the usage of songs from the Madame X album.

The film was nominated for Best Long Form Video at the 2022 MTV Video Music Awards, but lost to Taylor Swift's All Too Well: The Short Film.

== Music ==
A music album was released digitally in October 2021 to accompany the film, followed by a vinyl edition in September 2023.

== See also ==
- List of Paramount+ original programming
