= Madame X: Music from the Theater Xperience =

2021 live album by Madonna

Live album by Madonna
- Released: October 8, 2021
- Recorded: January 12–23, 2020
- Venues: Coliseu dos Recreios (Lisbon, Portugal)
- Length: 92:37
- Label: Warner

Madonna chronology
| Madame X (2019) | Madame X: Music from the Theater Xperience (2021) | Finally Enough Love: 50 Number Ones (2022) |

Madame X: Music from the Theater Xperience is the sixth live album by Madonna, released by Warner Records on October 8, 2021 through all digital platforms. It accompanied the release of the concert film of the same name, which documented her Madame X Tour. The live album contains the audio of all performances from the film. It is Madonna's first release with Warner since Sticky & Sweet Tour (2010).

== Background ==
On August 11, 2023, media outlets started to announce the release for the first time of the live album in vinyl format. It was formally announced on Madonna's birthday on August 16. The physical format includes one version in black vinyl and the second in limited edition picture disc. The album also includes two unreleased songs from the original digital album: "Crave" and the Cesária Évora cover "Sodade" with Dino D'Santiago.

== Critical reception ==
Professional ratings
Review scores
| Source | Rating |
|---|---|
| Jenesaispop | 3.5/5 stars |
| PopMatters | 7/10 |
| Retro Pop | 4/5 stars |

Peter Piatkowski from PopMatters commented the album "captures Madonna at her most Madonna-est", further saying "It's ridiculous, wonderful, and fantastic. It's Madonna".

== Commercial performance ==
Commercially, the album charted in component record charts of the United Kingdom and the United States, and Spain's main album charts. In France, the album peaked at number ninety on the chart, almost two years later following the vinyl release.

== Track listing ==
Madame X: Music from the Theater Xperience track listing
| No. | Title | Writer(s) | Length |
|---|---|---|---|
| 1. | "Intro" | Madonna; Dave Hall; Shawn McKenzie; Kevin McKenzie; Michael Deering; Mirwais Ahmadzaï; Jason Evigan; Brittany Hazzard | 1:38 |
| 2. | "God Control" | Madonna; Ahmadzaï; Casey Spooner | 5:59 |
| 3. | "Dark Ballet" | Madonna; Ahmadzaï | 4:33 |
| 4. | "Human Nature" | Madonna; Hall; S. McKenzie; K. McKenzie; Deering | 7:03 |
| 5. | "Vogue" | Madonna; Shep Pettibone | 4:11 |
| 6. | "I Don't Search I Find" | Madonna; Ahmadzaï | 4:45 |
| 7. | "American Life" | Madonna; Ahmadzaï | 4:18 |
| 8. | "Batuka" | Madonna; Ahmadzaï; David Banda | 6:17 |
| 9. | "Fado Pechincha" (featuring Gaspar Varela) | João Linhares Barbosa; D. João Barnabé de Noronha | 1:41 |
| 10. | "Killers Who Are Partying" | Madonna; Ahmadzaï | 4:34 |
| 11. | "Crazy" | Madonna; Evigan; Hazzard; Mike Dean | 4:48 |
| 12. | "Welcome to My Fado Club" | Madonna; Patrick Leonard; Bruce Gaitsch | 1:52 |
| 13. | "Medellín" | Madonna; Ahmadzaï; Juan Luis Londoño; Edgar Barrera | 6:32 |
| 14. | "Extreme Occident" | Madonna; Ahmadzaï | 3:45 |
| 15. | "Breathwork" | Madonna; Pettibone | 3:21 |
| 16. | "Frozen" | Madonna; Leonard | 6:17 |
| 17. | "Come Alive" | Madonna; Jeff Bhasker; Hazzard; Dean | 5:34 |
| 18. | "Future" | Madonna; Thomas Pentz; Hazzard; Clément Picard; Maxine Picard; Quavious Marshall | 4:00 |
| 19. | "Like a Prayer" | Madonna; Leonard | 5:09 |
| 20. | "I Rise" | Madonna; Evigan; Hazzard | 6:19 |
| Total length: | | | 92:37 |

Madame X – LP edition bonus tracks
| No. | Title | Writer(s) | Length |
|---|---|---|---|
| 21. | "Sodade" | Armando Zeferino Soares |
| 22. | "Crave" | Madonna; Khalif Brown; Hazzard; Dean |

Notes

- On the digital edition, all tracks are noted as "Live at the Coliseu dos Recreios, Lisbon, Portugal, 1/12-23/2020".
- "Intro" consists of "Madame X Manifesto" played over "I Don't Search I Find" (Honey Dijon Remix). There is also a segment of Madonna's Woman of the Year Award speech from the 2016 Billboard Women in Music awards.
- "Human Nature" contains an a cappella version of "Express Yourself", as well as a speech featuring her daughters Estere, Stella and Mercy James.
- "Welcome to My Fado Club" contains elements of "La Isla Bonita", "Medellin" and "Sodade".
- "Breathwork" is a dance interlude which includes spoken words from "Rescue Me".
- "Future" contains a new solo second verse.
- "Sodade" is a duet with Dino D'Santiago.

== Charts ==
Chart performance for Madame X: Music from the Theater Xperience
| Chart (2021–2023) | Peak position |
|---|---|
| Australian Vinyl Albums (ARIA) | 14 |
| Croatian International Albums (HDU) | 1 |
| French Albums (SNEP) | 90 |
| German Album Downloads (GfK Entertainment) | 8 |
| Italian Vinyl Albums (FIMI) | 5 |
| Polish Vinyl Albums (ZPAV) | 50 |
| Portuguese Albums (AFP) | 24 |
| Scottish Albums (Official Charts) | 14 |
| Spanish Albums (PROMUSICAE) | 67 |
| UK Albums Sales (OCC) | 48 |
| UK Album Downloads (Official Charts) | 5 |
| US Top Current Album Sales (Billboard) | 58 |

== Release history ==
Release dates and formats for Madame X: Music from the Theater Xperience
| Region | Date | Format(s) | Label | Ref. |
|---|---|---|---|---|
| Various | October 8, 2021 | Digital download; streaming | Warner | |
| Various | September 22, 2023 | LP | Warner; Rhino | |
