= Crave (Madonna and Swae Lee song) =

2019 song by Madonna and Swae Lee

Single by Madonna and Swae Lee

from the album Madame X
- Released: May 10, 2019
- Genre: Pop; trap; hip hop
- Length: 3:21
- Label: Interscope
- Songwriters: Madonna Ciccone; Khalif Malik Ibn Shaman Brown; Brittany Hazzard
- Producers: Madonna; Billboard; Mike Dean

Madonna singles chronology
| "Medellín" (2019) | "Crave" (2019) | "I Rise" (2019) |

Swae Lee singles chronology
| "Poquito" (2019) | "Crave" (2019) | "Diva" (2019) |

Music video
- "Crave" on YouTube

"Crave" is a song by American singer-songwriter Madonna and American rapper Swae Lee, from the former's fourteenth studio Madame X (2019). The song was written by the two artists and Starrah, while production was handled by Madonna, Mike Dean, and Billboard. It was released by Interscope Records for digital download and streaming as the album's second single on May 10, 2019. The song has been noted as a pop, trap, and hip hop ballad inspired by Fado music, with the lyrics talking about desire and craving for someone who's running away. It was one of the first songs Madonna wrote for Madame X, but she put the work on hold when she began working with other musicians in Lisbon. When she revisited the song, Madonna came to the conclusion that a male voice was needed for inclusion and approached Swae Lee to sing with her, as she was a fan of his voice.

"Crave" received generally positive reviews from music critics, who praised its sound. However, there were some who found the song forgettable. In the United States, it reached the eleventh place of Billboard's Adult Contemporary chart, becoming her biggest hit there since "Frozen" (1998). It also gave Madonna her record-breaking 48th number-one hit on the Dance Club Songs chart. On the UK Singles Sales chart, it reached number 51. An accompanying music video, directed by Nuno Xico, was released on May 22, 2019; it features Madonna and Swae Lee singing the song on a New York City rooftop. A remix of the song was created by Tracy Young and performed on Madonna's 2019–20 Madame X Tour.

== Background and composition ==
"I liked the tone of his voice, so I asked him to be on it with me [...] I think he’s really talented, I think he’s a very good writer, I think he’s a great singer, and he’s so cute…He has good energy."

— Madonna talking about Swae Lee.

In 2017, Madonna relocated to Lisbon when seeking a top football academy for her son David Banda, who wanted to become a professional soccer player. While living in the city, she began meeting artists; painters and musicians, who would invite her to "living room sessions". In these sessions, they would bring food and sit around the table, and musicians would start playing instruments, singing Fado and samba music. On April 15, 2019, Madonna revealed her upcoming fourteenth studio album Madame X as the album's title. For the album, she worked with longtime collaborator Mirwais, who had previously contributed to her albums Music (2000), American Life (2003) and Confessions on a Dance Floor (2005), as well as Mike Dean, who served as a producer on Rebel Heart (2015), and Diplo. Madonna stated that "Crave" was one of the first songs she wrote for Madame X, but had to put on hold when she began working with other musicians in Lisbon. When Madonna revisited all the songs she had written, she listened to the track again and thought a male voice was needed on it, and asked Swae Lee to sing with her due to liking his voice. Of Madonna having approached him, Swae Lee said he was very excited; "we chilled in the studio in L.A. Just me, her and Mike Dean [...] and we would just bounce ideas off each other, it was cool."

"Crave" was written by Madonna, Swae Lee and Starrah, while production was handled by the singer, Dean, and Billboard. It has been described as a midtempo pop, trap, and hip hop ballad that features acoustic guitar, and hand-clap beat. Lyrically, according to Madonna, the song is about "desire and longing", and "chasing after [someone who is] running away". It presents influence from Lisbon's traditional Fado music and begins with Madonna singing "I'm tired of being far away from home, far from what can help, far from where it's safe", being a likely reference to the fact that the album was created while she was living in Lisbon. Madonna "sighs and sings breathlessly" until Swae Lee joins her for a "breezy chorus" about feelings that never fade, as both sing "'Cause you're the one I crave / And my cravings get dangerous", with their voices "twisting themselves around each other" until they lock in place. Daniel Megarry from Gay Times noted that "Crave" is sonically "a continuation of the vibe that Madonna debuted with lead single 'Medellín', moving away from dance-heavy sound of previous albums Rebel Heart and MDNA and stripping things back á la Ray of Light, her magnum opus".

== Critical reception ==
"Crave" was met with generally positive reviews from music critics. Writing for Rolling Stone, Rob Sheffield deemed it one of the "truly great Madonna moments" on Madame X. Also from the magazine, Emily Zemler referred to the song as "a sultry pop number about hungering for another person", praising Swae Lee's "smooth-talking verse". NME's El Hunt called the song a "breezy, low-key moment" that recalls the feeling of "heartbreak" from Madonna's fourth studio album Like a Prayer (1989), "and yet sounds nothing like it". For Jeremy Helligar from Variety stated it "wouldn't sound out of place on Ariana Grande's latest album". Sal Cinquemani from Slant Magazine praised the "rawness" on Madonna's voice, which he felt "amplifies the nakedness of her lyrics". Robbie Barnett from the Washington Blade called it the album's best vocal collaboration.

Sean Maunier, for Metro Weekly, called it "arresting and ethereal [...] sounds like it comes from a different world entirely". Us Weekly's Nicholas Hautman felt that "Crave" and album track "Crazy" both have "potential to be stadium sing-alongs should they make it onto Madonna’s live setlists". For The Guardian, Ben Beaumont-Thomas said "Crave" counted with an "elegant, sinewy melody that twines around you rather than jabbing you into submission". The HuffPost's Daniel Welsh opined it was one of the moments on Madame X where Madonna gets introspective. Chris DeVille, from Stereogum, deemed the song a "misty ballad that makes Madonna emoting over trap drum programming sound like the most natural thing in the world". From Gay Star News, Jamie Tabberer was more critical: "featuring twangy guitars and gentle rap from Swae Lee, this languid ode to obsessive love [...] is too indistinct, and the delivery is wishy-washy". Jonny Coleman, from The Hollywood Reporter, said the track sounded like a "Rihanna leftover" and deemed it forgettable. Rich Juzwiak from Pitchfork dismissed the song as a "naked attempt to score Madonna her own 'We Belong Together'", criticizing her vocal delivery for being "flat as denial".

== Commercial performance ==
In the United States, "Crave" became Madonna's highest debut on Billboard's Adult Contemporary chart, debuting at number 19, for the issue dated June 8, 2019. It became her 37th entry on the chart and her 2nd appearance in the 2010s decade after "Ghosttown" (2015). The next week, the song climbed four places to number 15, becoming the "most added" song of the week. The song then climbed to its peak of 11, becoming Madonna's largest hit on the Adult Contemporary chart since "Frozen" (1998). The song also reached a peak of number 34 on the Adult Pop Songs chart, becoming her 21st entry on the chart and her largest hit on it since "Give Me All Your Luvin'" (2012). "Crave" also topped the US Dance Club Songs chart for the issue date of November 16, 2019, becoming Madonna's record-extending 49th single to do so in total.

In the United Kingdom, the song reached number 51 on the official sales chart, spending only one week on the chart. Similarly, on the UK Download chart, "Crave" debuted at its peak of number 49 for the week starting on May 17, 2019. In Scotland, the track peaked at number 64, staying inside the Scottish Singles Chart for one week. On the French downloads chart, the song also debuted at its peak of number 23, while in Hungary, the song reached number 28 on the Single Top 40. "Crave" further peaked at number 19 on Sweden's heatseeker chart, and reached number 22 on Billboard China's foreign language songs chart.

== Promotion ==
=== Music video ===
Scene of the "Crave" music video, featuring Madonna's hand reaching for Swae Lee's in a shot that was compared to Michelangelo's The Creation of Adam.

The music video for "Crave" was directed by Nuno Xico and released on May 22, 2019. Madonna had previously posted a teaser on her Instagram account the day before, while a rough, unfinished cut had been inadvertently uploaded by Xico to his Vimeo account. The video, which alternates between black-and-white and color, features Madonna and Swae Lee singing the track on New York City rooftops. It opens with Madonna, as her alter ego Madame X, writing a love note on a scroll. She then says in voice-over "I am waiting for you. I have always been waiting for you. I'm attracted to danger, I crave it." Following this, she releases a carrier pigeon with a note that quotes Carson McCullers' The Heart Is a Lonely Hunter (1941), which eventually makes its way to Swae Lee. The clip then shows Madonna dancing by herself inside of an empty warehouse, interspersed with footage of Swae Lee shirtless on a rooftop that is filled with pigeon coops. The final scene shows the two of them reunited in a rooftop; they reach for each other's hands in a shot reminiscent of Michelangelo's The Creation of Adam while two pigeons fly away.

Alexa Camp from Slant Magazine praised the music video for being simpler than the one for Madonna's previous single "Medellín", although she criticized the singer's "hyper-sexualized" dance moves. The staff of Billboard called the visual "subtle" and deemed it "a nod to Brooklyn's beloved Pigeon Keepers". Trey Alston of MTV opined that the video was "astounding, peculiar, and marvelous", and also stated that "if you ever wanted to know if Madonna can out-dance you, this video offers proof that, undoubtedly, yes she can". According to Wass, "the sleek, beautifully-shot visual is wonderfully understated", and said it was Madonna's "most contemporary offering in a very long time".

=== Live performance ===
The Tracy Young remix of "Crave" was included on Madonna's 2019–20 Madame X Tour. It was performed before the encore and found the singer, who was joined by her twin daughters Estere and Stella Ciccone, amid "sequins and furs" and a full-sized disco ball. The performance was praised by Aidin Baziri, from the San Francisco Chronicle, who claimed that "as [Madonna] glided across the stage [...] it became clear where Katy, Miley, Britney, Gaga and Gwen all got their moves and gumption" from. On November 25, 2019, during her show at Los Angeles' Wiltern Theatre, Swae Lee joined Madonna for the performance. The performance was included as a bonus track on the limited vinyl release of Madame X: Music from the Theater Xperience.

== Track listing ==
Digital download / streaming
| No. | Title | Length |
|---|---|---|
| 1. | "Crave" (with Swae Lee) | 3:21 |

MNEK Remix
| No. | Title | Length |
|---|---|---|
| 1. | "Crave" (MNEK remix) | 3:34 |

Crave Remixes, Pt. 1
| No. | Title | Length |
|---|---|---|
| 1. | "Crave" (Tracy Young Dangerous Remix) | 4:47 |
| 2. | "Crave" (Tracy Young Dangerous Radio Edit) | 3:23 |
| 3. | "Crave" (Benny Benassi & BB Team Extended Remix) | 4:51 |
| 4. | "Crave" (Benny Benassi & BB Team Radio Edit) | 3:19 |
| 5. | "Crave" (RNG Club Remix) | 6:38 |
| 6. | "Crave" (Otto Benson Remix) | 4:22 |
| 7. | "Crave" (Twisted Dee & Diego Fernandez Remix) | 7:17 |
| 8. | "Crave" (Dan De Leon & Anthony Griego Remix) | 7:12 |

Crave Remixes, Pt. 2
| No. | Title | Length |
|---|---|---|
| 1. | "Crave" (Thomas Gold Extended Remix) | 3:51 |
| 2. | "Crave" (DJLW Remix) | 6:17 |
| 3. | "Crave" (Boris Remix) | 7:59 |
| 4. | "Crave" (Mike Cruz Club Remix) | 7:29 |
| 5. | "Crave" (Joe Gauthreaux & Leanh Radio Edit) | 3:10 |

== Credits and personnel ==
- Madonna – writer, vocals, producer
- Swae Lee – writer, vocals
- Starrah – writer
- Mike Dean – producer
- Billboard – producer

Credits and personnel adapted from the Madame X album liner notes.

== Charts ==
=== Weekly charts ===
| Chart (2019) | Peak position |
|---|---|
| China Airplay/FL (Billboard China) | 22 |
| France Downloads (SNEP) | 23 |
| Hungary (Single Top 40) | 38 |
| Italy Airplay (EarOne) | 30 |
| San Marino (SMRRTV Top 50) | 27 |
| Scottish Singles Sales (Official Charts) | 64 |
| Sweden Heatseeker (Sverigetopplistan) | 19 |
| UK Singles Sales (OCC) | 51 |
| UK Singles Downloads (Official Charts) | 49 |
| US Adult Contemporary (Billboard) | 11 |
| US Adult Pop Airplay (Billboard) | 34 |
| US Dance Club Songs (Billboard) | 1 |

=== Year-end charts ===
| Chart (2019) | Position |
|---|---|
| US Adult Contemporary (Billboard) | 32 |

== Release history ==
| Country | Date | Format(s) | Version | Label | Ref. |
|---|---|---|---|---|---|
| Various | May 10, 2019 | Digital download; streaming | Original | Interscope | |
| United States | May 20, 2019 | Hot adult contemporary | Original | Interscope | |
| Italy | August 2, 2019 | Radio airplay | Original | Universal | |
| Various | August 2, 2019 | Digital download; streaming | MNEK remix | Interscope | |
| Various | October 25, 2019 | Digital download; streaming | Remixes EP Pt. 1 | Interscope | |
| Various | November 15, 2019 | Digital download; streaming | Remixes EP Pt. 2 | Interscope | |

== See also ==
- List of Billboard number-one dance songs of 2019
