= Madame X Tour =

2019–2020 concert tour by Madonna

- Tour by Madonna
- Promotional poster for the tour
- Location: Europe; North America
- Associated album: Madame X
- Start date: September 17, 2019
- End date: March 8, 2020
- Legs: 2
- No. of shows: 75
- Attendance: 179,289
- Box office: US$51.4 million (Note: US$63.94 million in 2025 dollars.)

Madonna concert chronology
- Tears of a Clown (2016); Madame X Tour (2019–2020); The Celebration Tour (2023–2024)

The Madame X Tour was the eleventh concert tour by American singer Madonna, in support of her fourteenth studio album, Madame X (2019). It began on September 17, 2019, at the BAM Howard Gilman Opera House in New York City, United States, and ended on March 8, 2020, at the Grand Rex in Paris, France. An all-theater tour, it was the singer's first time playing small venues since the Virgin Tour (1985); she had previously shown interest in doing a smaller-scale show during a 2017 interview. The tour consisted exclusively of dates in the United States, Portugal, England, and France; mobile phones and smart watches were banned from the concerts, which was met with mixed reactions from fans.

The tour was met with positive reviews from critics, although the inclusion of Madame X album cuts garnered some criticism. Controversy arose due to Madonna's late show starts, with a fan going as far as to file a class action lawsuit against her. At the 2020 Billboard year-end boxscore charts, it was reported that Madame X had grossed over $36,385,935 from an audience of 124,655.

After several cancellations due to a recurring knee injury, the tour ended abruptly three days before its planned end date, following on from the French government announcing a ban on gatherings of more than 1,000 people to curb the spread of COVID-19 in the midst of the pandemic. Shot during the Lisbon dates, the concert film Madame X was directed by Ricardo Gomes, Sasha Kasiuha, and Nuno Xico. It had its premiere on September 23 at New York's Times Square Edition Hotel, and was released through Paramount+ on October 8, 2021. A live album titled Madame X: Music from the Theater Xperience was released on October 8, 2021 exclusively on streaming platforms and subsequently on vinyl.

== Background and development ==
In 2017, Madonna relocated to Lisbon when seeking a top football academy for her son David Banda, who wanted to become a professional association football player. While living in the city, she began meeting artists; painters and musicians who would invite her to "living room sessions." In the sessions, they would bring food and sit around the table, and musicians would start playing instruments, singing fado and samba music. The singer's fourteenth studio album Madame X was released on June 14, 2019; it became Madonna's ninth number-one album on the Billboard 200. Prior to the album's release, the singer had expressed the idea of going on tour during a backstage interview at the 2019 Billboard Music Awards. During a 2017 interview with BBC News Madonna had mentioned the possibility of doing a smaller-scale show; "I've done so many shows—world tours, stadiums, arenas, you name it—that I feel like I have to reinvent that now too. I like doing intimate shows and being able to talk directly to the audience." The Madame X Tour was officially announced by the singer on May 6, 2019, through her official Twitter account, where she posted a short promotional video co-starring Diplo. It visited smaller venues as the singer liked, in her own words, "the idea of staying in one place and people coming to me." It marked the first time Madonna toured theaters and small venues since 1985's the Virgin Tour.

Mobile phones and smart watches were banned from the concerts; attendees were required to put their devices in pouches ahead of each show. A source explained that "[Madonna] wants to have an intimate experience with her audience without phones up in the air and screens separating fans from the performance." Fans online complained of the "stress" of the ban, while others said it made for a "good concert experience." In a telephone interview with Mario Lopez for Megaphone, Madonna said the set list would be 70% new material. Jamie King was appointed creative director; personnel working on the tour included 41 musicians, Monte Pittman on guitar, backup singer Dana "Yahzarah" Williams, 12 dancers, and 14 of the 22 women of the Batukadeiras Orchestra.

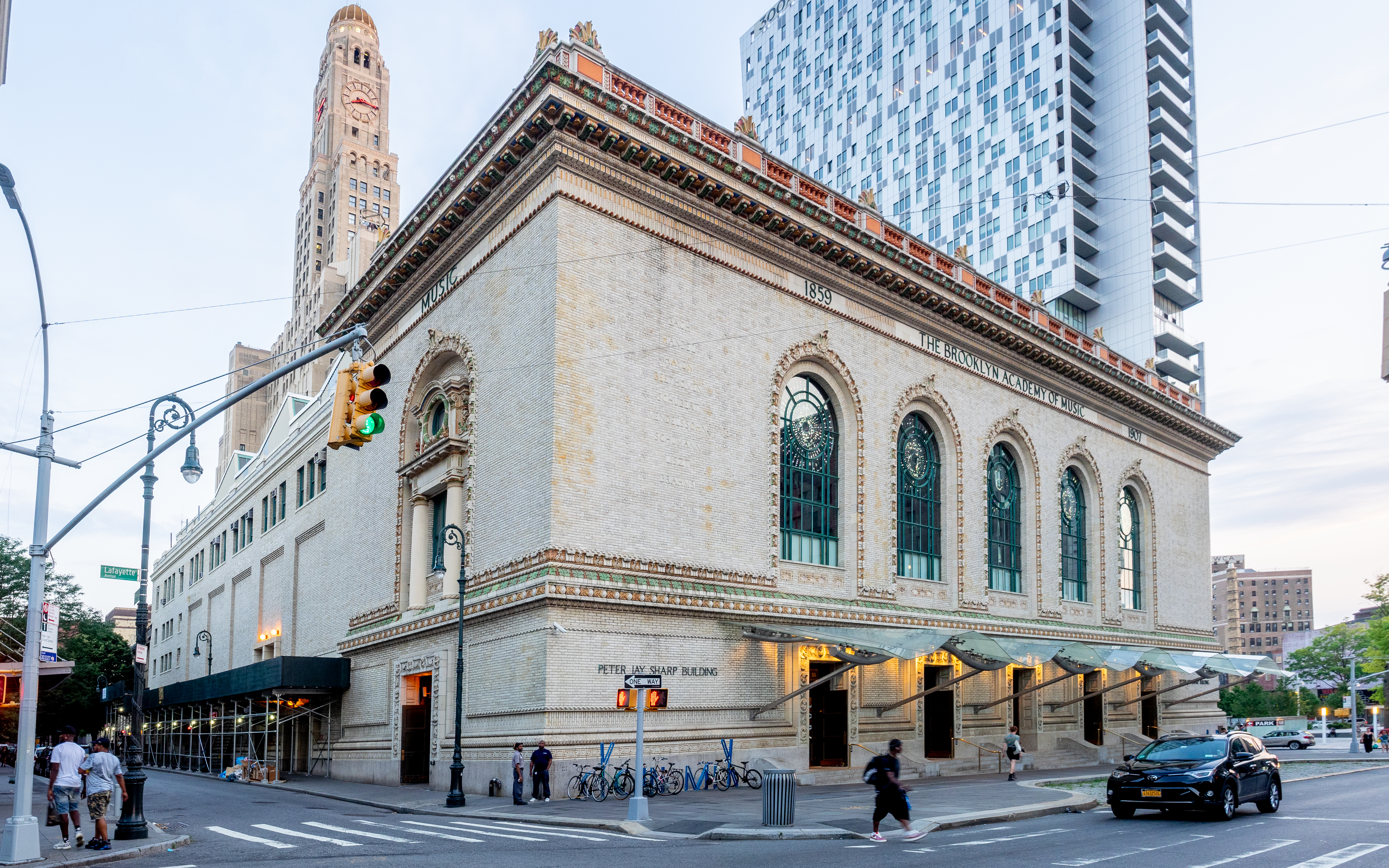
The BAM Howard Gilman Opera House (left) and the Grand Rex (right), where the Madame X Tour began and ended, respectively.

Stufish provided the show’s sets, which include mapped video projection, large-scale video images, staircases, and other reconfigurable scenic pieces that were compared to a Rubik's Cube. The wardrobe included a glittery Revolutionary War attire with feathered tricorne hat and a chiffon dress, with frills and Swarovski crystals designed by Francesco Scognamiglio. Additional articles were provided by Prada, Burberry, Miu Miu, and Versace. For the performance of "Frozen" (1998), Choreographer Damien Jalet with Luigi & Iango filmed a "dramatic" black and white video of Madonna's eldest daughter Lourdes Leon as a "shape-shifting spirit who finds her freedom through her movements." A week before the tour kicked off, a pop-up store was announced in New York; it counted with exclusive merchandise such as signed vinyls, signed and framed art prints, hand-painted hoodies, and tees. The store also had a make-up counter with artists available each day, an interactive photo booth, and a station where shoppers could add embroidery to their items. The Madame X Tour officially began on September 17, 2019, at New York City's BAM Howard Gilman Opera House, and ended on March 8, 2020, at Paris' Grand Rex.

== Concert synopsis ==
The show began with a quote by James Baldwin: "Art is here to prove that all safety is an illusion... Artists are here to disturb the peace." Then, a silhouetted woman sat at a typewriter; each key press sounding like a gunshot, accompanied by a dancer jerking and flinching as if he had been shot. Madonna then appeared to sing "God Control" while being bounced between two police officers’ shields. The number had cops attacking dancers under a video montage of news footage. "Dark Ballet" was performed next, with Joan of Arc references and the singer fighting dancers in gas masks reminiscent of the mice in The Nutcracker (1892); it counted with a ballet breakdown halfway through. Afterwards, Madonna yelled "Fuck the patriarchy!" before being dragged by dancers dressed as policemen into a circular cell in the stage. This led to a rendition of "Human Nature", as pointing fingers were projected across the stage, and she joined percussionist Miroca Paris on the congas. Towards the end, she was surrounded by 11 black women − including her twin daughters Stella, Estere, and Mercy James − and chanted the phrase "I'm not your bitch!" An a capella rendition of "Express Yourself" and a brief interlude where Madonna addressed the audience followed.

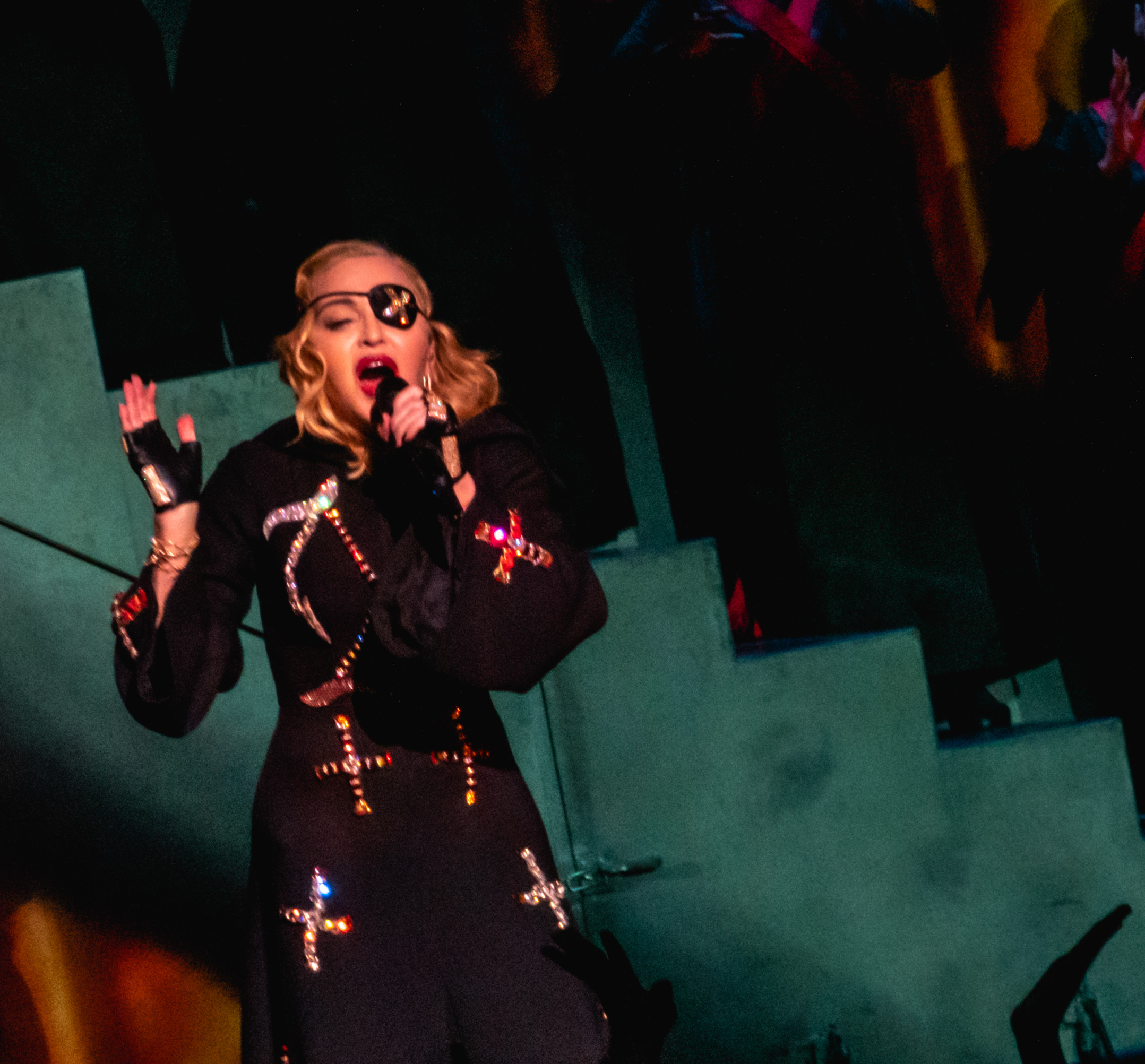
Madonna performing "Like a Prayer" as the concert's second to last number

"Vogue" and "I Don't Search I Find" were performed with lookalike dancers dressed in blonde wigs, trench coats, shades, and high heels. Next, Madonna sang the first verse and chorus of "Papa Don't Preach"; she changed the lyric "I'm keeping my baby" to "I'm not keeping my baby". Afterwards, she played guitar for "American Life" while uniforms fell down from above the stage, and dancers dressed as soldiers dragged a coffin. A short video led to "Batuka", which had 14 women of the Batukadeiras Orchestra playing the drums while Madonna sat to the side on a stairwell, before eventually joining them and doing batuque moves. What came next were performances of Isabel De Oliveira's "Fado Pechincha", and Madame X album tracks "Killers Who are Partying" and "Crazy" - the last one was played with an accordion. A cha-cha-chá mashup of "La Isla Bonita" and a new song called "Welcome to My Fado Club" was performed next, followed by a guitar rendition of Cesária Évora's "Sodade" including Miroca Paris who performed and recorded with Cesária Évora for over a decade. The next numbers were "Medellín", with Maluma appearing on the backdrop screens, and album track "Extreme Occident". An interlude of dancers doing synchronized moves to lyrics of "Rescue Me" followed.

"Frozen" saw the singer performing in the middle of a massive projection of the video of Leon. For "Come Alive", Madonna and the dancers wore colorful flowing robes. She then played the piano for "Future" and was joined by dancers with red lights on their eyes; the word "Warning" flashed on the stage behind her as she sang. The Tracy Young remix of "Crave" featured Madonna dancing with her twin daughters, while "Like a Prayer" had her performing in front of an X-shaped staircase while surrounded by a choir and the song's music video projected on the stage. The final number, "I Rise", began with Emma González' speech being presented on the screen, which then showed news footage of protests and marches. Halfway through, the screen turned the colors of the Rainbow flag as Madonna and her dancers left the stage through the audience with their fists raised.

== Reception ==
=== Critical ===
The Madame X Tour was met with positive reviews from critics; Rolling Stone's Rob Sheffield deemed it "excellent" and a "testament to the genius in her madness", concluding that it proves "Madonna will never be the kind of superstar who repeats her successes, sticks to her strengths, or plays it safe. Instead, she's getting weirder with age. Thank all the angels and saints for that." Jon Pareles, writing for The New York Times, said on his review that, "as both album and show, 'Madame X' is Madonna's latest declaration of a defiant, self-assured, flexible identity that's entirely comfortable with dualities [...] Yes, she is 61, but her music remains determinedly contemporary." Variety's Ilana Kaplan considered it, "at times[,] performance art, a political rally, a comedy show, a church and even her home in Lisbon." Rhian Daly from NME gave the concert a particularly positive review by calling it "powerful, empowering, stunning", and "one of the best gigs of the year." Bradley Stern, for Paper, opined it was "unlike any other Madonna tour to date", as well as a "hybrid between an actual theatrical production and a concert." According to Pollstar's Amy Linden, the Madame X Tour is an example of what is known within the music industry as an "underplay [...] when an A or maybe B+ level musician opts out of the de rigueur arena or shed tour in favor of a more intimate and modest venue [...] With Madame X, Madonna joins the ranks of an impressive list of musicians who have also turned the volume down, so to speak." Liden concluded that being able to see the singer in "such close proximity" added a "magical and elite vibe."

"While she did take the stage over an hour late, Madonna proved that she is still at the top of her game musically [...] [She] put on an amazing live show at the BAM Howard Gilman Opera House in the heart of Brooklyn. She is still the 'Queen of Pop' and shows no signs of relinquishing that throne anytime soon. She is a true visionary, whose music and artistry gets bigger and better each year."

— Markos Papadatos' review of the New York City concert

Will Gompertz from BBC News gave the concert a five-star rating, and opined it was "perfectly imperfect, like one of those sketchy landscapes by Cezanne where you can see his underdrawings and misplaced lines, making it so much more beautiful and real than Canaletto's soulless precision." Gompertz concluded his review by saying Madame X was an "adventurous piece of contemporary theatre, and a match for any of the Tony and Olivier-winning shows currently playing the West End and Broadway."

Aidin Vaziri from the San Francisco Chronicle noted how, even though the singer was "battling a cold, suffering from a torn ligament and had a bad knee", she still put on a "spectacular show." For Las Vegas Weekly, Josh Bell considered it, despite the smaller venues, "every bit as majestic as Madonna's arena tours." The performances were also praised; Bell highlighted "Human Nature" and "American Life" for fitting "best with the theme of defiance", and "Like a Prayer" for being "every bit as awe-inspiring and empowering as when it was first released." LA Weekly's Brett Callwood singled out the "gorgeous rendition" of "Frozen" and the "hair-raising" "Like a Prayer". Stern felt the singer had recreated performances from the past: he saw "American Life" as a "minimized version" of the Re-Invention World Tour (2004) performance; "Vogue" and "I Don't Search I Find" recalled Madonna's appearance at Stonewall 50 – WorldPride NYC 2019; "Dark Ballet" and "Like a Prayer" were "essentially the same stairwell-style set up" of both the Met Gala and Eurovision performances, and "Medellín" was "more or less a recreation of her 2019 Billboard Awards performance." Leslie Katz, writing for the San Francisco Examiner, considered "Batuka" "the evening's most joyous number." For Digital Journal, Markos Papadatos singled out the rendition of "Crave" as "sheer bliss", and considered "Like a Prayer" the "anthem for the night" that earned the singer a "lengthy standing ovation."

The inclusion of Madame X album tracks was met with both criticism and praise; Kaplan said it was "almost cruel" that singles such as "Papa Don't Preach" and "Express Yourself" were "cut to under a minute", while the album tracks were performed on its entirety. For Philadelphia's Victor Fiorillo, there was "too much [Madame X] material — some of it straight-up filler — and presented in such a meandering way, that any sense of flow, arc, or climax was continuously undermined." Rob Sheffield applauded the inclusion of album tracks, as he felt they "work much better in a theater setting." Daly opined that the singer looked happiest when she was "paying tribute to the musicians and sounds that inspired her to make that record" rather than "her wealth of classics." From Consequence, Michael Roffman felt the singer's "self-deprecating and brazenly honest" behavior was "far more riveting than hearing fucking 'Into the Groove' again."

In more critical reviews, Selena Fragassi from the Chicago Sun-Times opined that, although the singer "relied way too heavily on Auto-Tune, and her intimate between-act stage banter was incredibly bizarre and disjointed [...] when she was on stage all eyes were glued to her." Entertainment Weekly's Leah Greenblatt wrote: "The show is hardly without flaws: her political messaging, though heartfelt, is often clumsily on the nose, and several set projections leaned toward the community-theater end of things." Leslie Katz classified Madame X as "paradoxically both charming and offputting [...] Although [the] setting was smaller than the arenas she's filled during her decades as the world's biggest pop star, it was hardly an intimate or casual affair." Mikael Wood, from the Los Angeles Times, expressed, "for Madonna, intimate doesn't necessarily mean focused. Like the Madame X album [...] the opening Wiltern concert was a bit of a mess." Fiorillo wrote that, "the theater of Madonna just doesn't work as a piece of theater, and great theater is clearly what she is trying to achieve." He felt the show could have benefited from "a real director [...] somebody who [...] could transform the show from a concert with some really cool theatrical elements into an evening of beautiful theater." The staff of Billboard named the Madame X Tour one of the best live shows of 2019. Five years later, the magazine deemed it Madonna's ninth best concert tour, describing it as "part jukebox musical, part avant-garde performance art and part standup special".

=== Commercial ===
The first tickets and VIP packages were allotted to the members of Icon, Madonna's official fan club; price for entrances ranged from $60 to $760. Additionally, fans were given the opportunity to purchase tickets at $10 through the singer's official website. Due to an "overwhelming demand", more concerts were announced in New York and Los Angeles the same day the tour was officially confirmed. In October, Billboard reported that the first 16 dates had grossed $9.6 million and sold over 31,401 tickets. At the 2020 Billboard year-end boxscore charts, it was reported that the Madame X Tour had raked in $36,385,935 from an audience of 124,655; additionally, the shows at the London Palladium were ranked on the seventh position of the top 25 Boxscore of the year, with $9,816,383 grossed.

== Lateness criticisms and cancellations ==
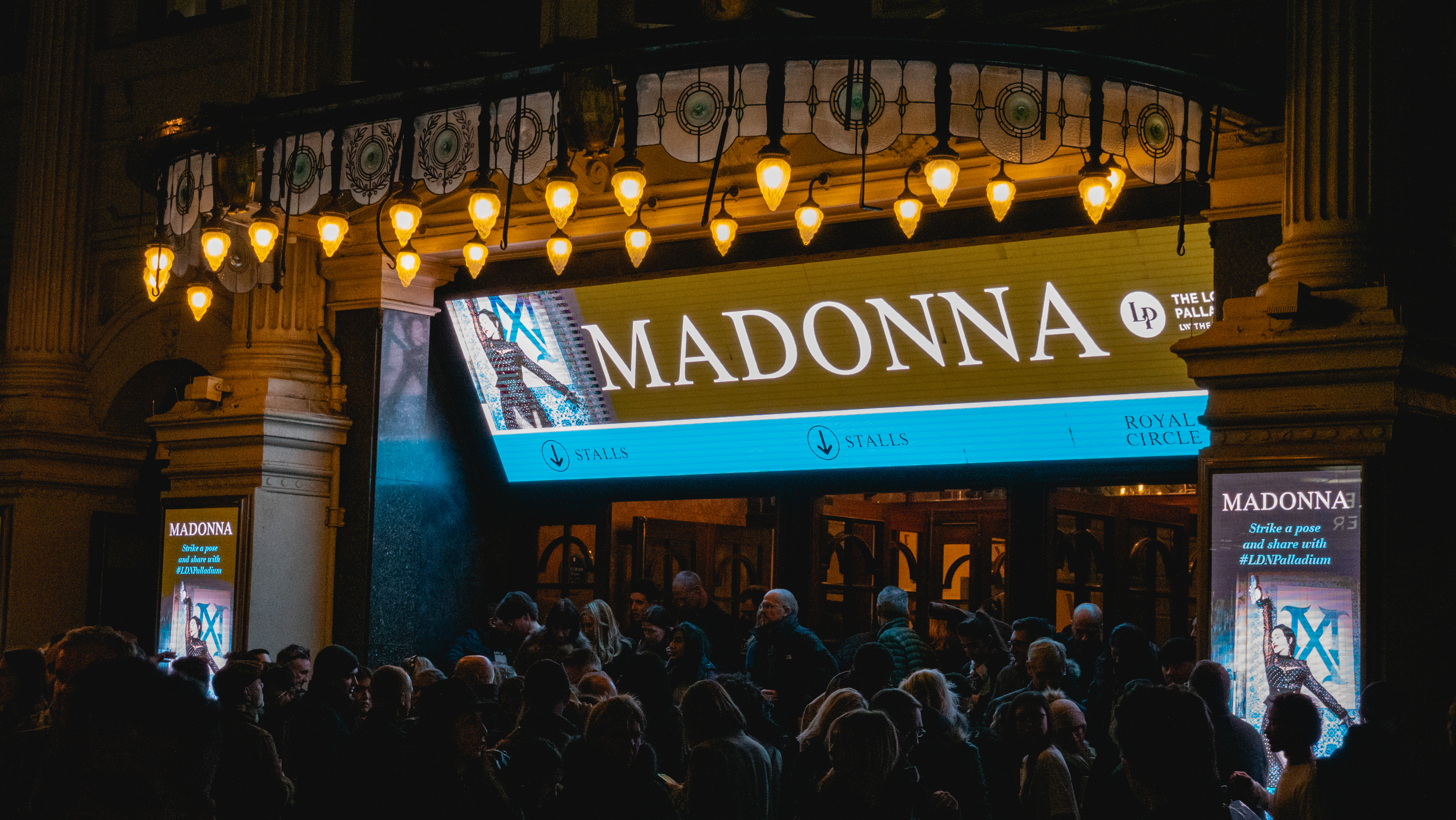
Banner for one of the London shows at the Palladium. Madonna claimed the venue tried to "censor" her by cutting short a concert after she ran over her curfew.

Madonna's lateness in starting some of the performances was widely criticized. In Las Vegas, she took the stage at 12:30 am when the concert was scheduled to start at 10:30 pm; she then told the audience: "A queen is never late." This was met with backlash from fans, who demanded a refund and deemed her attitude "condescending and alienating." A man from Florida named Nate Hollander went as far as to file a class action lawsuit against Madonna after the Miami concert he planned to attend was pushed back by two hours to accommodate the singer's lateness. "Ticketholders had to work and go to school the next day, which prevented them from attending a concert that would end at around 1:00 a.m.", the lawsuit read. Hollander then attempted to obtain a refund for the three entrances he had purchased but was unsuccessful. Due to the singer's late appearance for the February 5, 2020, concert in London, the show went over the Palladium's 11pm curfew, causing the venue to lower the curtain before the performance had finished. The final song, "I Rise", was performed with the lights and Madonna's microphone switched off. She claimed it was "5 minutes past our 11:00 curfew" and accused the venue of trying to "censor" her and of "pulling down the metal fire curtain that weighs 9 tons." The venue denied having used the fire curtain, but did not directly comment on the show being cut short. Madonna then posted a video on Instagram showing her swearing from behind the curtain, before eventually returning to perform "I Rise".

Following the cancellation of the last North American concert, the singer took to Instagram and talked about the "indescribable" pain caused by an injury: "As I climbed the ladder to sing 'Batuka' on Saturday night in Miami I was in tears from the pain of my injuries [...] With every song I sang, I said a prayer that I would make it to the next and get thru [sic] the show [...] However this time I have to listen to my body and accept that my pain is a warning I want to say how deeply sorry I am to all my fans." After several cancellations due to the recurring injury, the tour ended abruptly three days before its planned final date, after the French government announced a ban on gatherings of more than 1,000 people to curb the spread of COVID-19 in the midst of the pandemic.

== Concert film and live album ==
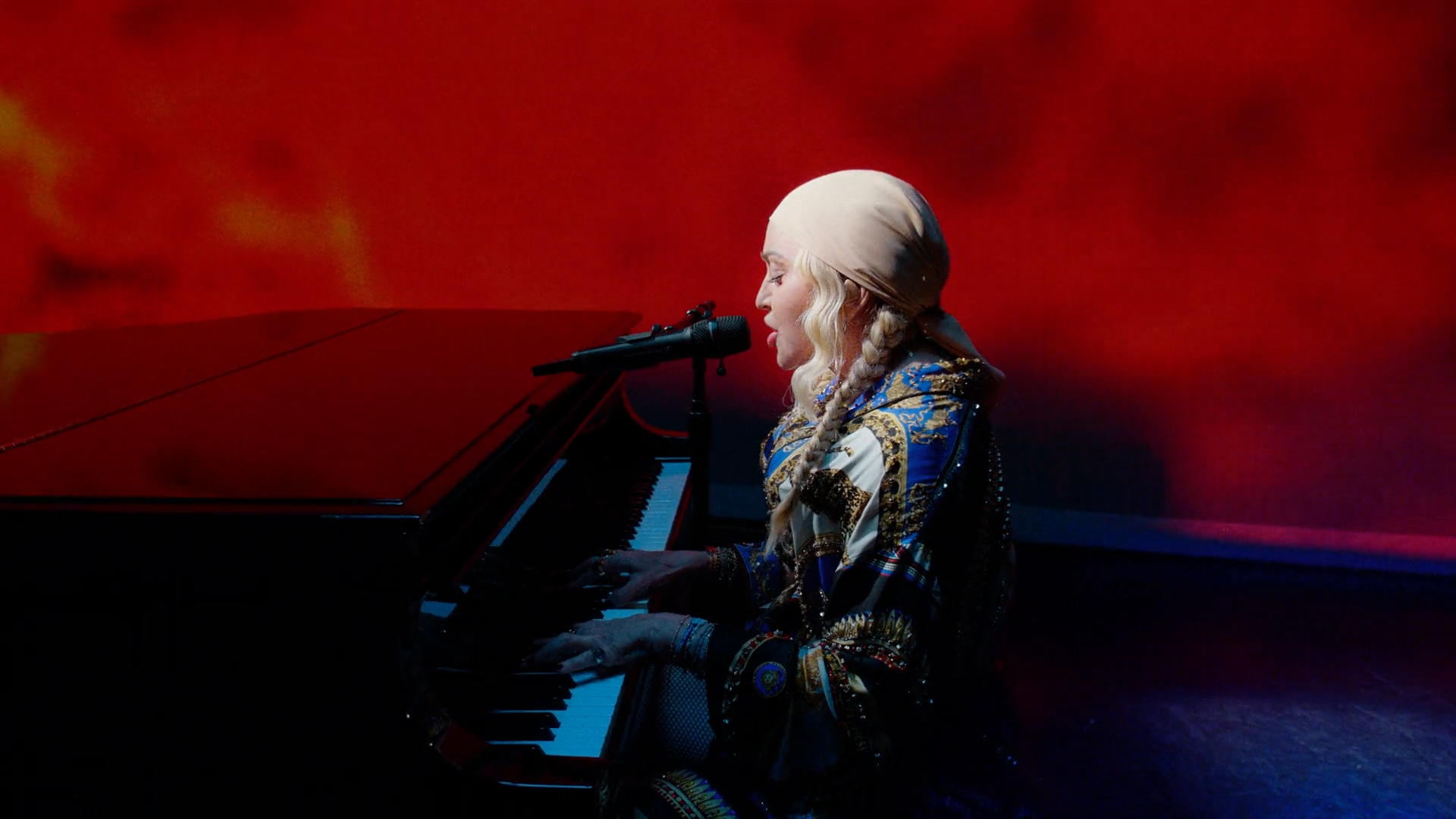
Madonna playing piano while singing "Future" on one of the tour's concerts

On February 18, 2021, ¡Hola! reported that Madonna would release a documentary film with behind-the-scenes footage from the tour exclusively through Netflix. A source said the project would depict the Madame X Tour "for the spectacle that it was", revealing how the singer "quite literally put blood, sweat and tears into [the concert]." The article also said Madonna was "incredibly involved", having spent weeks "watching previews and helping to edit the footage at home." That same month, it was reported that Madonna was re-shooting scenes for the film. On July 15, 2021, it was announced that the documentary would premiere exclusively through Paramount+ on Friday October 8; it would be available for subscribers in North and South America, Australia, and the Nordics. The film made its television debut on October 7, when it aired on MTV UK.

Shot during the Lisbon concerts and directed by Ricardo Gomes, Sasha Kasiuha, and Nuno Xico, Madame X had its premiere on September 23 at New York's Times Square Edition Hotel; Madonna herself attended the event. Reviews were generally positive: The Guardian's Alexis Petridis deemed it "beautifully shot", while according to NME's Nick Levine it "proves the Queen of Pop is still in her prime." On a more mixed review, Owen Gleiberman from Variety opined the documentary is "heavy on message" but "light in euphoria." To promote the release, Madonna gave a surprise performance in the basement of Marcus Samuelsson's Harlem restaurant Red Rooster. The live album, Madame X: Music from the Theater Xperience, was released on October 8, 2021 exclusively on streaming platforms and vinyl.

== Set list ==
The following set list was obtained from the concert held on October 16, 2019, at the Chicago Theatre. It does not represent all concerts for the duration of the tour.

Act I

1. "God Control"
2. "Dark Ballet"
3. "Human Nature"
4. "Express Yourself" (A cappella chorus)
5. "Papa Don't Preach" (String intro)

Act II

6. "Madame X Manifesto" (Video interlude)
7. "Vogue"
8. "I Don't Search I Find"
9. "Papa Don't Preach"
10. "American Life"

Act III

11. "Batuka" (with video introduction)
12. "Fado Pechincha" (Isabel De Oliveira cover)
13. "Killers Who Are Partying"
14. "Crazy"
15. "Welcome to My Fado Club" (Contains elements of "La Isla Bonita")
16. "Sodade" (Cesária Évora cover)
17. "Medellín"
18. "Extreme Occident"

Act IV

19. "Rescue Me" (Dancers interlude)
20. "Frozen"
21. "Come Alive"
22. "Future"

Act V

23. "Crave" (Tracy Young Remix)
24. "Like a Prayer"

Encore

25. "I Rise"
Notes
- Swae Lee joined Madonna for the performance of "Crave" during the November 25, 2019, Los Angeles concert.
- Dino d'Santiago joined Madonna for the performance of "Sodade" during the concerts in Lisbon.
- During the third Lisbon concert, Madonna sang Elvis Presley's "Can't Help Falling in Love" (1961) acapella.
- During the London concert on February 6, 2020, Madonna performed "Don't Cry for Me Argentina" in honor of its composer Andrew Lloyd Webber, who was allegedly in the audience.
- On February 8, 2020, Madonna sang Simon & Garfunkel's "The Sound of Silence" (1965).

== Shows ==
List of 2019 concerts
Date (2019)	City	Country	Venue	Attendance (Tickets sold / available)	Revenue
September 17	New York City	United States	Howard Gilman Opera House	31,401 / 31,401	$9,631,760
September 18	New York City	United States	Howard Gilman Opera House	31,401 / 31,401	$9,631,760
September 19 (Note: This concert was part of the Citi Sound Vault concert series.)	New York City	United States	Howard Gilman Opera House	31,401 / 31,401	$9,631,760
September 21	New York City	United States	Howard Gilman Opera House	31,401 / 31,401	$9,631,760
September 22	New York City	United States	Howard Gilman Opera House	31,401 / 31,401	$9,631,760
September 24	New York City	United States	Howard Gilman Opera House	31,401 / 31,401	$9,631,760
September 25	New York City	United States	Howard Gilman Opera House	31,401 / 31,401	$9,631,760
September 26	New York City	United States	Howard Gilman Opera House	31,401 / 31,401	$9,631,760
September 28	New York City	United States	Howard Gilman Opera House	31,401 / 31,401	$9,631,760
October 1	New York City	United States	Howard Gilman Opera House	31,401 / 31,401	$9,631,760
October 2	New York City	United States	Howard Gilman Opera House	31,401 / 31,401	$9,631,760
October 3	New York City	United States	Howard Gilman Opera House	31,401 / 31,401	$9,631,760
October 5	New York City	United States	Howard Gilman Opera House	31,401 / 31,401	$9,631,760
October 6	New York City	United States	Howard Gilman Opera House	31,401 / 31,401	$9,631,760
October 10 (Note: The concerts on October 10 and 12 were set to take place on September 12 and 14, respectively; they were rescheduled due to production issues.)	New York City	United States	Howard Gilman Opera House	31,401 / 31,401	$9,631,760
October 12	New York City	United States	Howard Gilman Opera House	31,401 / 31,401	$9,631,760
October 16	Chicago	United States	Chicago Theatre	23,233 / 23,233	$5,517,435
October 17	Chicago	United States	Chicago Theatre	23,233 / 23,233	$5,517,435
October 21	Chicago	United States	Chicago Theatre	23,233 / 23,233	$5,517,435
October 23	Chicago	United States	Chicago Theatre	23,233 / 23,233	$5,517,435
October 24	Chicago	United States	Chicago Theatre	23,233 / 23,233	$5,517,435
October 27	Chicago	United States	Chicago Theatre	23,233 / 23,233	$5,517,435
October 28 (Note: This concert was set to take place on October 15, but was rescheduled.)	Chicago	United States	Chicago Theatre	23,233 / 23,233	$5,517,435
November 2	San Francisco	United States	Golden Gate Theatre	6,744 / 6,744	$1,945,333
November 4	San Francisco	United States	Golden Gate Theatre	6,744 / 6,744	$1,945,333
November 5 (Note: This concert was set to take place on October 31, but was rescheduled.)	San Francisco	United States	Golden Gate Theatre	6,744 / 6,744	$1,945,333
November 7 (Note: Due to Madonna showing up two hours later than the official start time, past after midnight, this concert technically took place on November 8.)	Paradise (Note: Promoted as Las Vegas)	United States	The Colosseum at Caesars Palace	12,613 / 12,613	$4,244,777
November 9	Paradise	United States	The Colosseum at Caesars Palace	12,613 / 12,613	$4,244,777
November 10	Paradise	United States	The Colosseum at Caesars Palace	12,613 / 12,613	$4,244,777
November 13	Los Angeles	United States	Wiltern Theatre	17,941 / 17,941	$5,874,394
November 14	Los Angeles	United States	Wiltern Theatre	17,941 / 17,941	$5,874,394
November 16	Los Angeles	United States	Wiltern Theatre	17,941 / 17,941	$5,874,394
November 17	Los Angeles	United States	Wiltern Theatre	17,941 / 17,941	$5,874,394
November 19	Los Angeles	United States	Wiltern Theatre	17,941 / 17,941	$5,874,394
November 20	Los Angeles	United States	Wiltern Theatre	17,941 / 17,941	$5,874,394
November 21	Los Angeles	United States	Wiltern Theatre	17,941 / 17,941	$5,874,394
November 23	Los Angeles	United States	Wiltern Theatre	17,941 / 17,941	$5,874,394
November 24	Los Angeles	United States	Wiltern Theatre	17,941 / 17,941	$5,874,394
November 25	Los Angeles	United States	Wiltern Theatre	17,941 / 17,941	$5,874,394
December 7	Philadelphia	United States	The Met Philadelphia	11,604 / 11,604	$2,519,172
December 8	Philadelphia	United States	The Met Philadelphia	11,604 / 11,604	$2,519,172
December 10	Philadelphia	United States	The Met Philadelphia	11,604 / 11,604	$2,519,172
December 11	Philadelphia	United States	The Met Philadelphia	11,604 / 11,604	$2,519,172
December 14	Miami Beach (Note: Promoted as Miami)	United States	The Fillmore Miami Beach	13,339 / 13,339	$3,727,742
December 15	Miami Beach	United States	The Fillmore Miami Beach	13,339 / 13,339	$3,727,742
December 17	Miami Beach	United States	The Fillmore Miami Beach	13,339 / 13,339	$3,727,742
December 18	Miami Beach	United States	The Fillmore Miami Beach	13,339 / 13,339	$3,727,742
December 19	Miami Beach	United States	The Fillmore Miami Beach	13,339 / 13,339	$3,727,742
December 21	Miami Beach	United States	The Fillmore Miami Beach	13,339 / 13,339	$3,727,742

List of 2020 concerts
Date (2020)	City	Country	Venue	Attendance (Tickets sold / available)	Revenue
January 12	Lisbon	Portugal	Coliseu dos Recreios	15,493 / 15,493	$2,930,802
January 14	Lisbon	Portugal	Coliseu dos Recreios	15,493 / 15,493	$2,930,802
January 16	Lisbon	Portugal	Coliseu dos Recreios	15,493 / 15,493	$2,930,802
January 18	Lisbon	Portugal	Coliseu dos Recreios	15,493 / 15,493	$2,930,802
January 21	Lisbon	Portugal	Coliseu dos Recreios	15,493 / 15,493	$2,930,802
January 23	Lisbon	Portugal	Coliseu dos Recreios	15,493 / 15,493	$2,930,802
January 29	London	England	London Palladium	26,002 / 26,002	$9,816,383
January 30	London	England	London Palladium	26,002 / 26,002	$9,816,383
February 1	London	England	London Palladium	26,002 / 26,002	$9,816,383
February 2	London	England	London Palladium	26,002 / 26,002	$9,816,383
February 5	London	England	London Palladium	26,002 / 26,002	$9,816,383
February 6	London	England	London Palladium	26,002 / 26,002	$9,816,383
February 8	London	England	London Palladium	26,002 / 26,002	$9,816,383
February 9	London	England	London Palladium	26,002 / 26,002	$9,816,383
February 12	London	England	London Palladium	26,002 / 26,002	$9,816,383
February 13	London	England	London Palladium	26,002 / 26,002	$9,816,383
February 15	London	England	London Palladium	26,002 / 26,002	$9,816,383
February 16 (Note: This concert was originally set to take place on January 26, but was rescheduled.)	London	England	London Palladium	26,002 / 26,002	$9,816,383
February 22	Paris	France	Le Grand Rex	20,919 / 20,919	$5,153,216
February 23	Paris	France	Le Grand Rex	20,919 / 20,919	$5,153,216
February 26	Paris	France	Le Grand Rex	20,919 / 20,919	$5,153,216
February 27	Paris	France	Le Grand Rex	20,919 / 20,919	$5,153,216
February 29	Paris	France	Le Grand Rex	20,919 / 20,919	$5,153,216
March 3	Paris	France	Le Grand Rex	20,919 / 20,919	$5,153,216
March 4	Paris	France	Le Grand Rex	20,919 / 20,919	$5,153,216
March 8	Paris	France	Le Grand Rex	20,919 / 20,919	$5,153,216
Total				179,289 / 179,289 (100%)	$51,361,009

=== Cancelled dates ===
List of cancelled concerts
Date (2019–2020)	City	Country	Venue	Reason
September 15	New York City	United States	BAM Howard Gilman Opera House	Production issues
October 7	New York City	United States	BAM Howard Gilman Opera House	Injury
November 12	Los Angeles	United States	Wiltern Theatre	Scheduling limitations
November 30	Boston	United States	Wang Theatre	Injury
December 1	Boston	United States	Wang Theatre	Injury
December 2	Boston	United States	Wang Theatre	Injury
December 22	Miami	United States	The Fillmore Miami Beach	Injury
January 19	Lisbon	Portugal	Coliseu dos Recreios	Injury
January 22	Lisbon	Portugal	Coliseu dos Recreios	Injury
January 27	London	England	London Palladium	Injury
February 4	London	England	London Palladium	Injury
February 11	London	England	London Palladium	Injury
February 20	Paris	France	Le Grand Rex	Injury
February 25	Paris	France	Le Grand Rex	Injury
March 1	Paris	France	Le Grand Rex	Injury
March 7	Paris	France	Le Grand Rex	Injury
March 10	Paris	France	Le Grand Rex	Measure taken by the French government in face of COVID-19 advance
March 11	Paris	France	Le Grand Rex	Measure taken by the French government in face of COVID-19 advance

== Personnel ==
Credits adapted from Madonna's official website.

Show

- Created and directed by Madonna
- Jamie King – creative producer
- Megan Lawson – co-director and lead choreographer
- Damien Jalet – creative advisor and choreographer
- Luigi Murenu & Iango Henzi – creative consultants
- Carla Kama – associate creative producer
- Tiffany Olson – associate creative producer
- Stephanie Roos – associate creative producer
- Al Gurdon – lighting designer
- Stufish Entertainment Architects – set design

Band

- Madonna – vocals, piano, guitar
- Kevin Antunes – musical director
- Monte Pittman – guitar
- Gaspar Varela – Portuguese guitar
- Rickey Pageot – piano, accordion and percussion
- Jéssica Pina – trumpet and background vocalist
- Adelmiro "Miroca" Paris – percussion and guitar
- Carlos Mil-Homens – percussion
- Francesca Dardani – violin
- Célia Hatton – viola
- Mariko Muranaka – cello
- Andrea "Munchie" Lanz – background vocalist
- Dana "Yahzarah" Williams – background vocalist

Performers

- Ahlamalik Williams – dancer
- Marvin Gofin – dancer
- Mccall Olsen – dancer
- Baylie Olsen – dancer
- Allaune Blegbo – dancer
- Sasha Mallory – dancer
- Loic Mabanza – dancer
- Daniele Sibili – dancer
- Sierra Herrera-Grey – dancer
- Chaz Buzan – dancer
- Nicolas Huchard – dancer
- Ai Shimatsu – M stand in

Batukadeiras

- Jussara Spencer
- Anastásia Carvalho
- Edna Oliveira
- Jéssica Eliane Tavares
- Irina Paula Carvalho
- Darlene Barreto
- Cátia Ramos
- Antónia Tavares
- Keila Cabral
- Ellah Barbosa
- Iara Xavier Santos
- Jacira Duarte
- Etelvina "Bianina" Tavares
- Idilsa Tavares

Choreographers

- Megan Lawson
- Matt Cady
- Marvin Gofin
- Damien Jalet
- Nicolas Huchard
- Baylie Olsen
- Mccall Olsen
- Ahlamalik Williams
- Derrell Bullock

Assistant choreographers

- Nicolas Huchard
- Amilios Arapoglou
- Sierra Herrera
- Allaune Blegbo

Costume department

- Eyob Yohannes – costume designer
- Taryn Shumway – assistant costume designer
- Timothy Chernyaev – assistant costume designer
- Kenberly Pierre-Paul – assistant costume designer
- Mae Heidenreich – assistant costume designer
- Aliyah Christmas – assistant costume designer
- Amanda Kai – costume department coordinator
- Samuel Ososki – tailor
- Michael Velasquez – tailor
- Anthony Garcia – tailor
- Raquel Castellanos – assistant
- Robert Christie – costume sketcher
- Lisa Krizner-George – cutter
- Thayne Whitney – stitcher/patternmaker
- Ke Cindy – seamstress
- Teri Lloyd – seamstress
- Sandra Nieto – seamstress
- Ivanova Mariano – seamstress
- Mallory Rinker – seamstress
- Olga Kim – tailoring
- Izabella Litvak – tailoring
- Aris Bordo – tailoring
- Noelle Rasco – stitching
- Arielle Crawford – stitching
- Anna Kate Reep – stitching

Live Nation

- Arthur Fogel – tour promoter and producer
- Gerry Barad – associate promoter
- Tres Thomas – tour director
- Colleen Cozart – production accountant

The Team

- Andy Lecompte – hair stylist for Madonna
- Aaron Henrikson – make-up artist for Madonna
- Tony Villanueva – head dresser
- Diogo Gonçalves – assistant
- Corvett Hunt – hair stylist
- Kamilah Gerestant – braider
- Justin Heslop – makeup artist

Tour crew

- Jason "JD" Danter – production manager
- Brian Wares – stage manager
- Mike Morobitto – theatrical stage manager
- Emma Cederblad – production coordinator
- Harry Forster – lighting director
- Oli James – lighting crew chief
- James Jones III – lighting tech
- Mike Rothwell – lighting tech
- Dave Baxter – lighting tech
- Matt Levine – lighting tech
- Jason "Lew Lew" Lewis – rigger
- Sean Mullarkey – automation
- Rod "Rawd" Van Egmond – head carpenter
- Allen "A.J." Haley – carpenter
- Eric Cardoza – props/carpenter
- Tim Colvard – FOH engineer
- Mike Dean – audio consultant
- Sean Solymar – audio consultant
- Demetrius Moore – M audio tech
- Sean Spuehler – vocal mix engineer
- Lauren D'elia – vocal mix engineer
- Matt Napier – monitor engineer
- Alistair "Ali" Viles – RF/audio engineer
- Lee Fox-Furnell – monitor tech
- Arno Voortman – audio system engineer
- Robert “Bongo” Longo - Head Backline : Kevin Antunes Tech
- Tommy Simpson – backline tech (strings)
- Iain "Robbo" Robertson – backline tech (drums/percussion)
- Dan Roe – programmer
- Gemma Daly – ambiance
- Allison Sulock – video server tech
- Dany Lambert – video projectionist
- Heken "Mel" Dykes – wardrobe supervisor
- Candice Lawrence – wardrobe
- Noriko Kakihara – wardrobe
- Michael Velasquez – tailor

Video content

- Danny Tull – video content director
- Nuno Xico – editor
- Russ Senzatimore – editor
- Tom Watson – editor
- Jerry Chia – editor
- Ryan Drake – editor
- Hamish Lyons – editor

Tour book design

- Anya Lange

Tour book photography

- Ricardo Gomes
- Steven Klein

Participating designers

- Elizabeth Manuel
- Prada
- Miu Miu
- Burberry
- Versace
- Paula Rowan
- Mugler
- Agent Provocateur
