= Batuka (song) =

2019 song by Madonna

Song by Madonna

from the album Madame X
- Genre: Batuque; afrobeat
- Length: 4:57
- Label: Interscope
- Songwriters: Madonna Ciccone; Mirwais Ahmadzaï; David Banda
- Producers: Madonna; Mirwais

Music video
- "Batuka" on YouTube

"Batuka" is a song recorded by American singer-songwriter Madonna for her fourteenth studio album, Madame X (2019). The song was written by Madonna and her son David Banda, alongside her longtime collaborator Mirwais, while produced by Madonna and the latter of the three. It features the Batukadeiras Orchestra, an all-women group that play drums on the song. It is a batuque song with influences of Afrobeat, featuring a call and response structure, and the lyrics of the song are about "overcoming adversity".

"Batuka" received generally positive reviews from music critics, with some deeming it as one of the album's highlights. An accompanying music video for the song was released on July 19, 2019, which was an attempt to recreate the atmosphere of the first time Madonna met the Batukadeiras Orchestra, as well as their journey together. The song was included on Madonna's 2019–2020 Madame X Tour, with the group performing in a semi-circle, playing drums, while Madonna performed batuque moves.

== Background and recording ==
They weren't used to singing into microphones so there was a comical aspect to it. We realized we had to record things separately because I was singing in 4/4 time, and they were playing their txabeta triplet time. In any case, for me it was an amazing experience because they were so open to anything I suggested and to collaborating. They brought their fire and their passion.

— Madonna describing the recording of the song with the Batukadeiras Orchestra.

In 2017, Madonna relocated to Lisbon when seeking a top football academy for her son David Banda, who wanted to become a professional association football player. While living in the city, she began meeting artists; painters and musicians, who would invite her to "living room sessions". In the sessions, they would bring food and sit around the table, and musicians would start playing instruments, singing Fado and samba music. One of the first musicians Madonna met was a man named Dino D'Santiago, who introduced her to the Batukadeiras Orchestra, a collective of drummers from Cape Verde; the members ranged from teenage girls to older women. Madonna described her first encounter with them as an "amazing" experience, stating that their music was "mesmerizing and hypnotizing" and left her impressed as she had never heard anything like that.

After meeting, they agreed on recording a song for Madonna's new album, Madame X. In the recording studio, the singer wrote down some words that she encouraged the Batukadeiras Orchestra to "just repeat" after her. Through D'Santiago, who acted as a translator, she explained to them the meaning of the song; according to Madonna, the group liked it as their philosophy was about "fighting for their rights and empowering women". After recording the song, they insisted on everyone in the studio all praying together, afterwards the Batukadeiras Orchestra blessed Madonna and wished her well. The singer commented that it was a positive encounter and a moment of "hugging and tears". According to Madonna, the first title of the song was "Fernalism" because it was meant to be a feminist manifesto, and she also did not want to say "feminism" due to her feeling it sounded conventional or predictable. Once she realized it was too abstract, the singer retitled the song to "Batuka" because according to her, "that's what it is, that's the style of music that it is. That seemed to work. Created by women, played by women."

== Composition and lyrics ==
"Batuka" was written by Madonna, Mirwais and Banda, while production was handled by the singer and Mirwais. Madonna stated that even though all of her children sing on the song, Banda was the only one who asked for songwriting credits. It was described as a batuque song, with influences of Afrobeat. It features drums played by the Batukadeiras Orchestra, and a call and response structure, with the group singing their own solos in the Cape Verdean Creole language. The lyrics deal with "overcoming adversity", while Madonna warns of "a storm ahead" over vocodered vocals. The lyrics "Get that old man/put him in a jail/where he can’t stop us" were considered a reference to then President of the United States Donald Trump. Madonna herself disagreed, declaring, "Oh gosh, pick a head of state – I think you might have a few". Will Hodgkinson from The Times noted that the song "has a wayward quality reminiscent of Brazil's late-1960s tropicalia movement", while Lucy O'Brien, writing for The Guardian, commented that it "has a dark, percussive female power".

== Critical reception ==
"Batuka" received generally positive reviews from music critics. Justin Ravitz from Refinery29 called the track "a defiant, joyful cry for rebellion with a rousing call-and-response structure". Nicholas Hautman of Us Weekly stated the song was "literally a banger", while C. M. from The Economist called it "hypnotic". C.M.'s opinion was shared by The Quietus' CJ Thorpe-Tracey. For musicOMH's Nick Smith, the song "could almost have been lifted from a Nelly Furtado album", while for Craig Jenkins from New York magazine, "Batuka" is "the kind of drum-driven call-and-response number M.I.A. and Diplo sold to the international community on Piracy Funds Terrorism 15 years ago". Xavi Sancho from El País wrote that the Batukadeiras Orchestra gives "a martial rhythm to something that could be a mix between Gwen Stefani and Carlinhos Brown and that ends in something, again, fresh and rich".

Sean Maunier from Metro Weekly opined that the song "may be the greatest departure for Madonna", and that her accompanied by the "all-women Batukadeiras Orchestra, produc[es] an absolutely otherworldly effect". Kristi Kates of the Northern Express newspaper said that fans would appreciate songs like "Batuka" on the album. Variety's Jeremy Helligar was similarly positive, selecting the song as one of the highlights from Madame X. Robbie Barnett from the Washington Blade noted that the song was one of "the most notable examples of the influence Portugal has injected into Madonna since she moved to Lisbon", coming off "like a fabulous jam session". Alexandra Pollard from The Independent classified it as a "rabble-rousing chant". In a mixed review, Wren Graves of Consequence of Sound commented that the Batukadeiras Orchestra provide a "much-needed spark" to "Batuka", though called the song "repetitive". A negative review was provided by Daniel Megarry from Gay Times, who ranked it as the last track on his list of Madame X's best tracks, saying, "Unfortunately, this song just didn't do anything for us. Nothing. Na-dah. Zilch."

== Music video ==
Filming for the music video for "Batuka" took place during April 2019, in Praia de São Julião of Sintra, Portugal. It was directed by Emmanuel Adjei, who was also director of the video for "Dark Ballet" (2019), and premiered on July 19, 2019 through Refinery29. In an interview with the website, Madonna said that she and the directing team wanted to honor how she met the Batukadeiras Orchestra and their journey together, with an "organic" and "beautiful cinematic" experience. They found a house that looked like a typical one from Cape Verde, and chose a more natural environment for their first meeting place, with Madonna saying it "wasn't easy to replicate the significance of our first meeting and how it all happened". Madonna elaborated, stating that she hoped it "captures the range of emotions that I felt coming from them, and their music", wanting to show the strength and the history, as well as how "expressive" she felt like their faces were and having wanted to capture it in the close-ups.

Madonna, surrounded by the Batukadeiras Orchestra, during the song's music video

The music video begins with a message that reads, "Batuque is a style of music created by women that originated in Cape Verde, some say the birth place of slave trade. The drums were condemned by the Church and taken away from the slaves because it was considered an act of rebellion. The women continued their singing and dancing and the Batuque lives on today". It cuts to scenes focusing on the women of the Batukadeiras Orchestra, showing a series of portraits of their faces while they sing, beat out rhythms on drums, walk, and stand on a clifftop, from which the group look out to the sea. Madonna then appears, wearing a green and black dress, distinguished from the white-garbed women. Madonna performs a freestyle dance, as she thought that "there was no need or call for choreography. The dancing was organic and fluid; I just watched them move and joined them."

Upon its release, it received positive reviews from critics. Little Black Book website staff called the video "groundbreaking", and said: "Arguably no music video, in more than 70 videos that Madonna has made in her incredible career, has been more like an authentic document of a real event", while they deemed it as a "heartfelt expression of the power of music to cross boundaries, to raise spirits, and to heal". Ravitz branded the visual "striking", while Attitude and Rolling Stone labeled it as "stunning". Kirsten Spruch from Billboard noted how the video references Portugal's "brutal history". The staff of Público opined that it was "full of emotion" and "willing to put its finger on the colonial wound, with ghost caravels". Mike Nied from Idolator said that "she has, once again, expertly achieved her goals" of capturing the emotions Madonna felt from the Batukadeiras Orchestra.

== Live performance ==
Madonna included "Batuka" on the setlist of her 2019–2020 Madame X Tour. She was joined by 14 of the 22 women of the Batukadeiras Orchestra while performing. The performance began with the group gathering around in a semi-circle and pounding away at drums, while Madonna sat to the side on a stairwell before eventually joining them, and doing some "hip-shimmying" batuque moves. According to Bradley Stern from Paper magazine, the performance was "essentially the song's music video come to life". For Leslie Katz of San Francisco Examiner, it was "the evening's most joyous number", while Spencer Kornhaber from The Atlantic said it was "one of a number of relatively shapeless Madame X songs improved in person by intensity and imagery". The performance was included on the live album Madame X: Music from the Theater Xperience.

== Credits and personnel ==
- Madonna – writer, vocals, producer
- Mirwais – writer, producer
- David Banda – writer
- Batukadeiras Orchestra – background vocals

Credits and personnel adapted from the liner notes of Madame X.
