= Rescue Me (Madonna song) =

1991 single by Madonna

Single by Madonna

from the album The Immaculate Collection
- Released: February 25, 1991
- Studio: Axis Recording (New York City)
- Genre: Dance-pop; gospel-house
- Length: 4:51 (single); 5:31 (album)
- Label: Sire; Warner Bros.
- Songwriters: Madonna; Shep Pettibone
- Producers: Madonna; Shep Pettibone

Madonna singles chronology
"Justify My Love" (1990)	"Rescue Me" (1991)	"This Used to Be My Playground" (1992)

Licensed audio
- "Rescue Me" on YouTube

Alternative cover
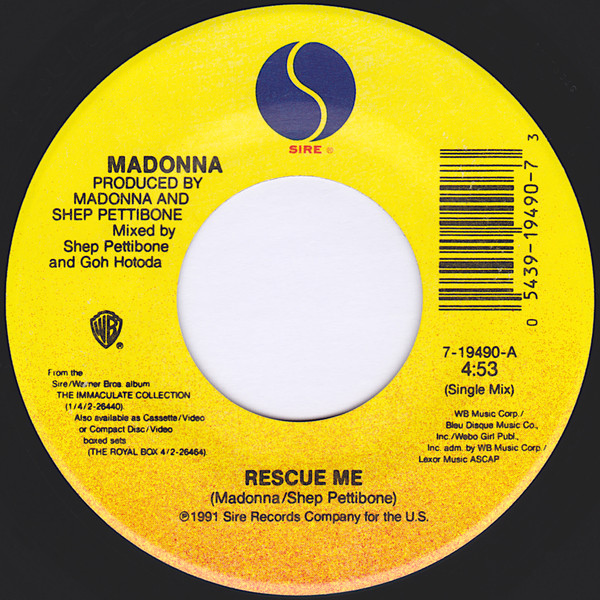
- Vinyl label

"Rescue Me" is a song by American singer Madonna from her first greatest hits album, The Immaculate Collection (1990). Written and produced by Madonna and Shep Pettibone, the song was released as the second single (third in the United Kingdom) from The Immaculate Collection on February 25, 1991, by Sire and Warner Bros. Records. A dance-pop and gospel-house track, the song is accompanied by the sound of thunder and rain, with the lyrics talking of romantic love rescuing the singer.

Remixes accompanied the song's commercial release. "Rescue Me" received positive critical response for both the original version and the remixes, as well as Pettibone's production work. Reviewers noted it as an example of Madonna's future musical endeavors. "Rescue Me" reached the top 10 of the record charts in Canada, Denmark, Ireland, Netherlands, Norway, the United Kingdom and the United States. In the latter country, it became Madonna's 22nd top-ten song on the Billboard Hot 100. Lyrics from the song were used during an interlude on Madonna's 2019–20 Madame X Tour.

== Background and release ==
By the end of 1990, Madonna was ready to release her first greatest hits collection, The Immaculate Collection. According to J. Randy Taraborrelli, author of Madonna: An Intimate Biography, the release was "much more than a mere collection of Madonna's biggest-selling and most popular songs". The singer relegated it as a "proud landmark" of her career which had progressed upwards since she broke out in the music scene in 1982. The collection had 15 of Madonna's previously released singles, along with two new songs, "Justify My Love" and "Rescue Me". The former was released as the first single from the record, and was controversial due to its explicit music video which had been banned from airing on television.

Prior to its release as a single, "Rescue Me" started receiving airplay on the radio as an album cut. The cover artwork featured a still image of Madonna from the music video of "Justify My Love". The single was first released in both Australia and Japan on February 25, 1991. On March 18, six additional formats were released in Australia, with one trio containing the 7-inch mix and the other featuring the S.O.S. mix. In Japan, a mini-album with alternate mixes of "Rescue Me" and "Justify My Love" was released on May 10. In the United States, the track was released as the album's second single on February 26, 1991, and as the third single on April 7 in the United Kingdom, due to "Crazy for You" (1985) released as the second single from the collection.

A video clip consisting of compiled footage from Madonna's 1987 Who's That Girl World Tour was eventually released to accompany the single. Lyrics from the song were used during an interlude on Madonna's 2019–20 Madame X Tour; a row of dancers "convulsed gracefully" to the song at the lip of the stage to irregular breaths, described as one of the concert's "most powerful dance moments" by The New York Times' Jon Pareles. The performance was featured in her documentary film Madame X (2021) and included on the live album, Madame X: Music from the Theater Xperience, titled as "Breathwork".

== Recording and composition ==
Madonna wrote and produced "Rescue Me" with Shep Pettibone, with whom she had worked on "Vogue". It was recorded at Axis Studios in New York City by engineer P. Dennis Mitchell, who was assisted by Curt Frasca and John Partham. Peter Schwartz played keyboards and did the programming on the track with assistance from Joe Moskowitz and Junior Vasquez. Tony Shimkin edited the song at Axis while Ted Jensen mastered it at Sterling Sound Studio. "Rescue Me" was mixed by Pettibone and Goh Hotoda at Soundworks Studio in New York. The mixing was done in QSound which at that time was a new audio filter to create a three-dimensional sound effect. This was employed on all of Madonna's past hits on The Immaculate Collection.

"Rescue Me"
A 30-second sample of "Rescue Me" starting just before the chorus of the track, with the bass line, piano, snaps, and percussion sounds. Madonna utters the initial lines rather than singing them as noted in a review.

"Rescue Me" is a dance-pop and gospel-house track. Larry Flick from Billboard described the song as a house colored pop-dance rave. According to sheet music published at Musicnotes.com by Alfred Publishing, the song is composed in the key of D♭ major with a moderate tempo of 116 beats per minute. It is set in the time signature of common time with Madonna's vocals ranging from B♭_{3} to E♭_{5}. The song follows a sequence of E♭m–D♭/E♭–A♭_{sus4}/E♭–A♭/E♭ as its chord progression. The song opens with a heartbeat and thunder, followed by a prominent bass line, piano, snaps, and percussion. Reminiscent of the songs by British synth-pop duo Yazoo and other 1980s disco acts, "Rescue Me" has Madonna growling the lines, especially towards the end. The thick arrangement has backing vocals by Dian Sorel, Catherine Russell and Broadway actor Lillias White. The ending of the track has the instrumentation fading away to leave just the backing vocals and then the song ends with the sound of thunder and rain.

Lyrically, "Rescue Me" makes allusions to love rescuing the singer. Author Santiago Fouz-Hernández noted in the book Madonna's Drowned Worlds that the lines portray the second theme prevalent in Madonna's work alongside sex, that of romantic love. The singer depicts love as savior in the lyrics when she belts "I believe in the power of love / I believe that you can rescue me". It references the 1967 songs, "Stop Her on Sight (S.O.S.)" by Edwin Starr and "Respect" by Aretha Franklin. According to Katharine Birbalsingh from The Daily Telegraph, the confessional lyrics found Madonna reaching out directly to the listener, "pleading for the love and attention" needed through the lines like "You see that I'm ferocious, you see that I am weak / You see that I am silly, and pretentious and a freak" before it turned to an affirmation of her grit.

Outside of the US, the song was released with Madonna's 1987 single "Spotlight" as its B-side. It was accompanied by eight different remixes by Pettibone. An extended mix was created called the "Titanic Vocal mix", alongside a stripped down "Houseboat Vocal mix" which used a new beat and instrumentation, the sound of piano and a sample from Madonna's 1986 single, "True Blue". The Lifeboat and the S.O.S. mixes incorporate louder and busy beats with the former being similar in composition to "Vogue". All of them keep the original vocals intact in the remix, with a dubbed version also being released.

== Critical reception ==
Larry Flick from Billboard magazine described Madonna's vocals as her "most potent to date" and Pettibone's production "stellar", while also complimenting the song's remixes, saying Pettibone "has outdone himself this time, creating several new versions that should suit a variety of formats... In any mix, 'Rescue Me' proves to be far meatier and long-lasting than the previous 'Justify My Love'." Taraborrelli described the track as a "standard, pulsating dance fare" noting it to be opposite of "Justify My Love". Rikky Rooksby found the "growling" vocals by Madonna to be "ill-advised" but was positive about the ending of the track with the sound of the rain and thunder. David Browne from Entertainment Weekly called the song as a "flimsy 'Vogue' rewrite" in his review for The Immaculate Collection, feeling that it did not break "new ground" for the singer. Alan Jones from Music Week stated that Madonna "moves uptempo with a rhythmically apposite dancefloor contender which will shine at retail too." He added, "Her consistency is awesome." James Hamilton from Record Mirror described it as "a gospel chorus punctuated at turns rasping and mumbling plaintive unhurried trotter". In an album guide for Rolling Stone, the track was described as "worthy" and "sensual". Andrew Harrison from Select relegated it as "more usual upfront Madonna dance workout with histrionic strings" but found it—along with "Justify My Love"—to showcase the singer's vulnerability, sexual predication and submission, all of which gave "Madonna's records an edge".

Jose F. Promis from AllMusic reviewed the remixes by Pettibone and gave a positive review believing them to have held up "surprisingly well" many years since their release and are "good examples of what house/pop dance music was like in the early '90s". A reviewer from Sputnikmusic rated the song four out of five, finding it similar to "Justify My Love" but "just not as good. It's a shame that this ends the album rather than [the former], but that's the way it goes, I suppose". Robbie Daw from Idolator listed "Rescue Me" as one of the best Madonna songs that radio had forgotten noting that the track, along with "Justify My Love" "kicked off [her] early '90s period where she gabbed through tracks rather than singing on them". Eric Henderson from Slant Magazine, while reviewing Celebration, described "Rescue Me" as "simmering" and the "upside" of The Immaculate Collection. James Rose from Daily Review noted that with the song Madonna began "a phase of her career that oscillates between cynical self-exploitation and courageous self-expression. Raunchy videos, explicitly themed lyrics and boudoir beats became de rigueur for the lady now arguably bearing the biggest name in popular music." LA Weekly's Michael Cooper ranked the track at number 14 in his list of Madonna's Top 20 Singles. He opined that the song heralded the singer's future musical endeavors with fifth studio album Erotica (1992), and was "innovative for its time" bridging the gap between Madonna of the 1980s and 1990s. Chuck Arnold from Entertainment Weekly listed "Rescue Me" as Madonna's 45th best single, writing that "if 'Vogue' had a gospel choir taking it to church, it might sound something like ['Rescue Me']". While ranking Madonna's singles in honor of her 60th birthday, Jude Rogers from The Guardian placed the track at number 44, calling it an example of the "over propulsive early-90s electronica". In March 2023, Billboard ranked the song as Madonna's 99th greatest ever, with Joe Lynch writing: "Tension-laden synths, a bubbling bass line and a warm house beat swirl like a baptismal rainstorm".

== Chart performance ==
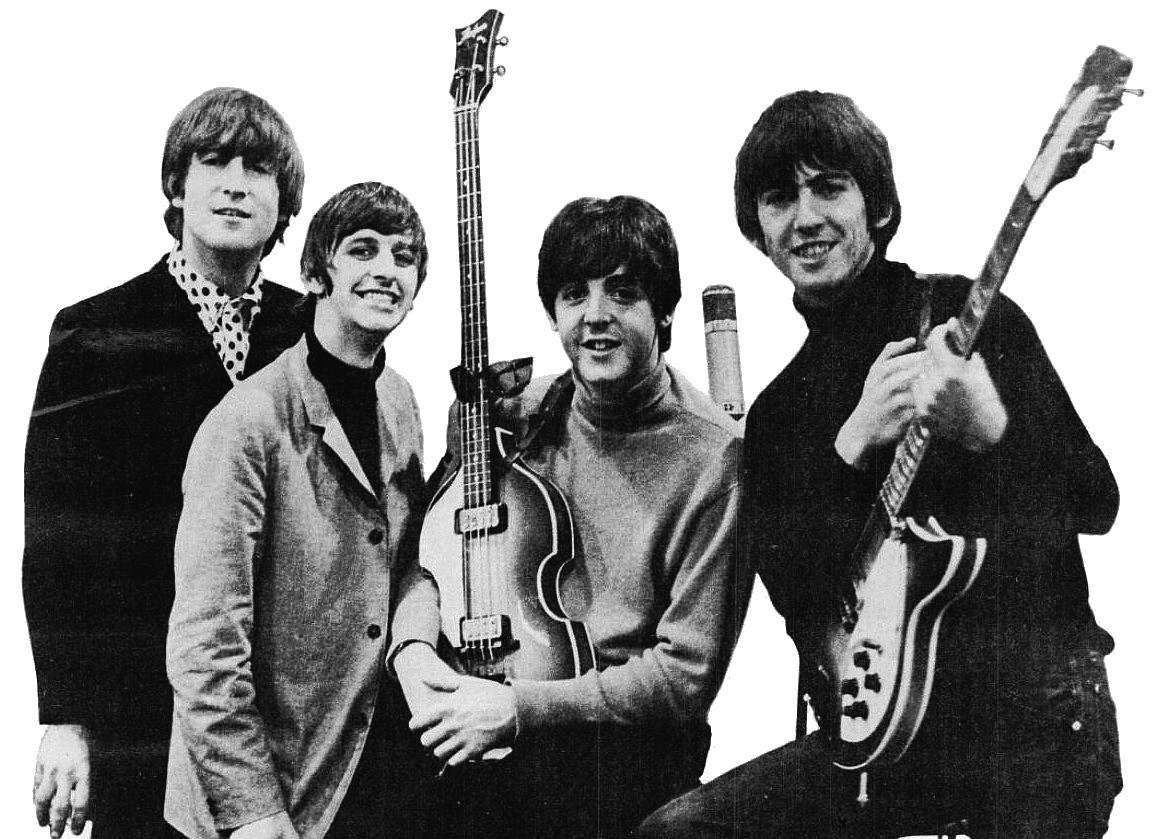
"Rescue Me" was the highest debut on the Billboard Hot 100 since the Beatles' "Let It Be" debuted at number six in March 1970.

In the United States, Michael Ellis from Billboard noted that "Rescue Me" had entered the Hot 100 Airplay chart prior to its commercial release, and had already climbed to number six. It was already being played in almost all major radio stations in the country. After release, the track debuted at number 15 on the Billboard Hot 100 chart on the week of March 2, 1991. It was the highest debut for a song within the previous 21 years, since the Beatles' "Let It Be" debuted at number six in March 1970. After three weeks, the song reached number nine on the Hot 100, becoming Madonna's 22nd top-ten single. The track reached number six on the Dance Club Play chart, aided by the remixes played in clubs. On May 24, 1991, "Rescue Me" was certified gold by the Recording Industry Association of America (RIAA) for shipments of over 500,000 copies. In Canada, the song debuted on the RPM 100 Hit Tracks chart at number 96 and reached a peak of number seven after nine weeks. It also reached top five on the RPM Dance chart. The song was present for a total of 16 weeks on the 100 Hit Tracks chart and ranked at number 55 on the 1991 year-end tabulation.

In Australia, "Rescue Me" debuted at number 31 on the ARIA Singles Chart, and after four weeks reached a peak of number 15. In New Zealand the song managed to reach number 18 and was present for six weeks on the chart. In the United Kingdom, the track had debuted at number 84 on the UK Singles Chart and then dropped off. It re-entered at number four in April 1991 and reached its peak position of number three a week later, being present for a total of nine weeks in the chart. According to Music & Media, the track reached the top of the UK sales chart. As of August 2008, it has sold 134,767 copies in the country according to the Official Charts Company. Across Europe, "Rescue Me" reached the top 20 of the charts in Belgium, Denmark, Ireland, Netherlands, Norway and Switzerland, and top 40 in France, Germany and Sweden. Its commercial performance in the European countries helped it attain a peak of number three on the Eurochart Hot 100, placing at number 90 on the year-end ranking.

== Track listing and formats ==
- US 12-inch maxi and cassette
1. "Rescue Me" (Titanic vocal mix) – 8:15
2. "Rescue Me" (Houseboat vocal mix) – 6:56
3. "Rescue Me" (Lifeboat vocal mix) – 5:20
4. "Rescue Me" (S.O.S. Mix) – 6:21
- US 7-inch and Japanese 3-inch CD single
1. "Rescue Me" (single mix) – 4:51
2. "Rescue Me" (alternate single mix) – 5:06
- UK 7-inch single
1. "Rescue Me" (single mix) – 4:51
2. "Spotlight" – 6:26
- Australian 7-inch vinyl
1. "Rescue Me" (single mix) – 4:51
2. "Rescue Me" (album version) – 5:31
- US Digipak CD maxi-single
1. "Rescue Me" (single mix)- 4:51
2. "Rescue Me" (Titanic vocal) – 8:16
3. "Rescue Me" (Houseboat vocal) – 6:58
4. "Rescue Me" (Lifeboat vocal) – 5:19
5. "Rescue Me" (S.O.S. Mix) – 6:25
- European CD single
1. "Rescue Me" (S.O.S. Mix) – 6:21
2. "Rescue Me" (Lifeboat vocal mix) – 5:20
3. "Rescue Me" (Houseboat vocal mix) – 6:56
- German CD single
1. "Rescue Me" (single mix) – 4:53
2. "Rescue Me" (Titanic vocal) – 8:15
3. "Rescue Me" (Demanding dub) – 5:20
- Digital single (2020)
1. "Rescue Me" – 4:56
2. "Rescue Me" (Titanic vocal) – 8:16
3. "Rescue Me" (Houseboat vocal) – 6:58
4. "Rescue Me" (Lifeboat vocal) – 5:19
5. "Rescue Me" (S.O.S. Mix) – 6:25
6. "Rescue Me" (Demanding dub) – 5:21
7. "Rescue Me" (alternate single mix) – 5:07

== Credits and personnel ==
Credits are adapted from The Immaculate Collection liner notes.

=== Management ===
- Recorded at Axis Studios, New York City, New York
- Mastered at Sterling Sound Studios, New York City, New York
- Mixed at Sound Works Studio, New York City, New York
- Freddy DeMann Management, The DeMann Entertainment Co. Ltd.
- Webo Girl Publishing, Inc., Warner Bros. Music Corp, Bleu Disc Music Co. Inc, Lexor Music (ASCAP)

=== Personnel ===
- Madonna – vocals, writer, producer
- Shep Pettibone – writer, producer, audio mixing
- P. Dennis Mitchell – recording engineer, recording
- Ted Jensen – mastering
- Goh Hotoda – audio mixing
- Curt Frasca – assistant engineer
- John Partham – assistant engineer
- Peter Schwartz – keyboard, programming
- Joe Moskowitz – additional programming
- Junior Vasquez – extra programming
- Tony Shimkin – editing
- Dian Sorel – background vocals
- Catherine Russell – background vocals
- Lillias White – background vocals
- Herb Ritts – photographer
- Jeri Heiden – art director

== Charts ==
=== Weekly charts ===
Weekly chart performance for "Rescue Me"
Chart (1991)	Peak position
Australia (ARIA)	15
Belgium (Ultratop 50 Flanders)	18
Canada Top Singles (RPM)	7
Canada Dance/Urban (RPM)	5
Canada Retail Singles (The Record)	4
Canada Contemporary Hit Radio (The Record)	3
Denmark (IFPI)	4
Europe (Eurochart Hot 100)	3
Europe (European Hit Radio)	7
Finland (Suomen virallinen lista)	4
France (SNEP)	21
Germany (GfK)	21
Italy (Musica e dischi)	12
Ireland (IRMA)	3
Luxembourg (Radio Luxembourg)	2
Netherlands (Dutch Top 40)	9
Netherlands (Single Top 100)	10
New Zealand (Recorded Music NZ)	18
Norway (VG-lista)	10
Sweden (Sverigetopplistan)	27
Switzerland (Schweizer Hitparade)	11
UK Singles (Official Charts)	3
UK Airplay (Music Week)	5
UK Dance (Music Week)	7
UK Club Chart (Record Mirror)	89
US Billboard Hot 100	9
US Dance Club Songs (Billboard)	6
US Dance Singles Sales (Billboard)	1
US Cash Box Top 100	11
US CHR & Pop (Radio & Records)	4

=== Year-end charts ===
Year-end performance for "Rescue Me"
Chart (1991)	Position
Canada Top Singles (RPM)	55
Canada Dance/Urban (RPM)	43
Europe (Eurochart Hot 100)	90
Europe (European Hit Radio)	67
Italy (Musica e dischi)	80
Netherlands (Single Top 100)	94
Sweden (Topplistan)	97
UK Singles (OCC)	79
US 12-inch Singles Sales (Billboard)	40

== Certification and sales ==
Certifications and sales for "Rescue Me"
Region	Certification	Certified units/sales
Japan (Oricon Charts)	—	14,510
United Kingdom	—	134,764
United States (RIAA)	Gold	500,000^{^}
^{^} Shipments figures based on certification alone.

== See also ==
- List of Billboard Hot 100 top 10 singles in 1991
- List of RPM number-one dance singles of 1991
- List of UK Singles Chart top 10 singles in 1991

== Book sources ==
- Cross, Mary (2007). Madonna: A Biography. Greenwood Publishing Group. ISBN 978-0-313-33811-3.
- Davies, Chris (1998). British and American Hit Singles: 51 Years of Transatlantic Hits, 1946–1997. Batsford Publishing. ISBN 978-0-713-48275-1.
- Fouz-Hernández, Santiago; Jarman-Ivens, Freya (2004). Madonna's Drowned Worlds: New Approaches to Her Cultural Transformations, 1983–2003. Ashgate Publishing. ISBN 978-0-754-63372-3.
- Morton, Andrew (2002). Madonna. Simon & Schuster. ISBN 978-0-312-98310-9.
- O'Brien, Lucy (2008). Madonna: Like an Icon. Corgi Publishers. ISBN 978-0-552-15361-4.
- Okamoto, Satoshi (2006). Oricon Album Chart Book: Complete Edition 1970–2005 (in Japanese). Roppongi, Tokyo: Oricon Entertainment. ISBN 978-4-87131-077-2.
- Rooksby, Rikky (2004). Madonna: The Complete Guide to Her Music. Omnibus Press. ISBN 978-0-711-99883-4.
- Taraborrelli, J. Randy (2008). Madonna: An Intimate Biography. Simon & Schuster. ISBN 978-0-330-45446-9.
