= Dark Ballet =

2019 song by Madonna

Promotional single by Madonna

from the album Madame X
- Released: June 7, 2019
- Genre: Experimental pop; electro-gospel
- Length: 4:14
- Label: Interscope
- Songwriters: Madonna; Mirwais Ahmadzaï
- Producers: Madonna; Mirwais

Music video
- "Dark Ballet" on YouTube

"Dark Ballet" is a song by American singer-songwriter Madonna from her fourteenth studio album Madame X (2019). It was released on June 7, 2019, as the album's third promotional single. Written and produced by Madonna and longtime collaborator Mirwais, the song contains a sample from The Nutcracker (1892) by Pyotr Ilyich Tchaikovsky, and was inspired by the historical figure Joan of Arc. It is an experimental pop and electro-gospel piano ballad, with the use of vocoder on her vocals and lyrics about rebelling against the patriarchy.

"Dark Ballet" received generally positive reviews from music critics, who deemed it a highlight from Madame X and one of Madonna's most experimental songs. In the United Kingdom, "Dark Ballet" peaked at number 83 on the official downloads chart. A music video, directed by director Emmanuel Adjei, was released on June 7, 2019. It features rapper Mykki Blanco playing Joan of Arc. Madonna first performed "Dark Ballet" during the 2018 Met Gala, known then as "Beautiful Game", and as the second number of her 2019−20 Madame X Tour.

== Background and composition ==
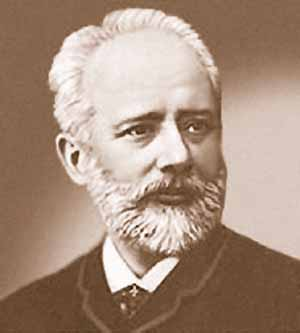
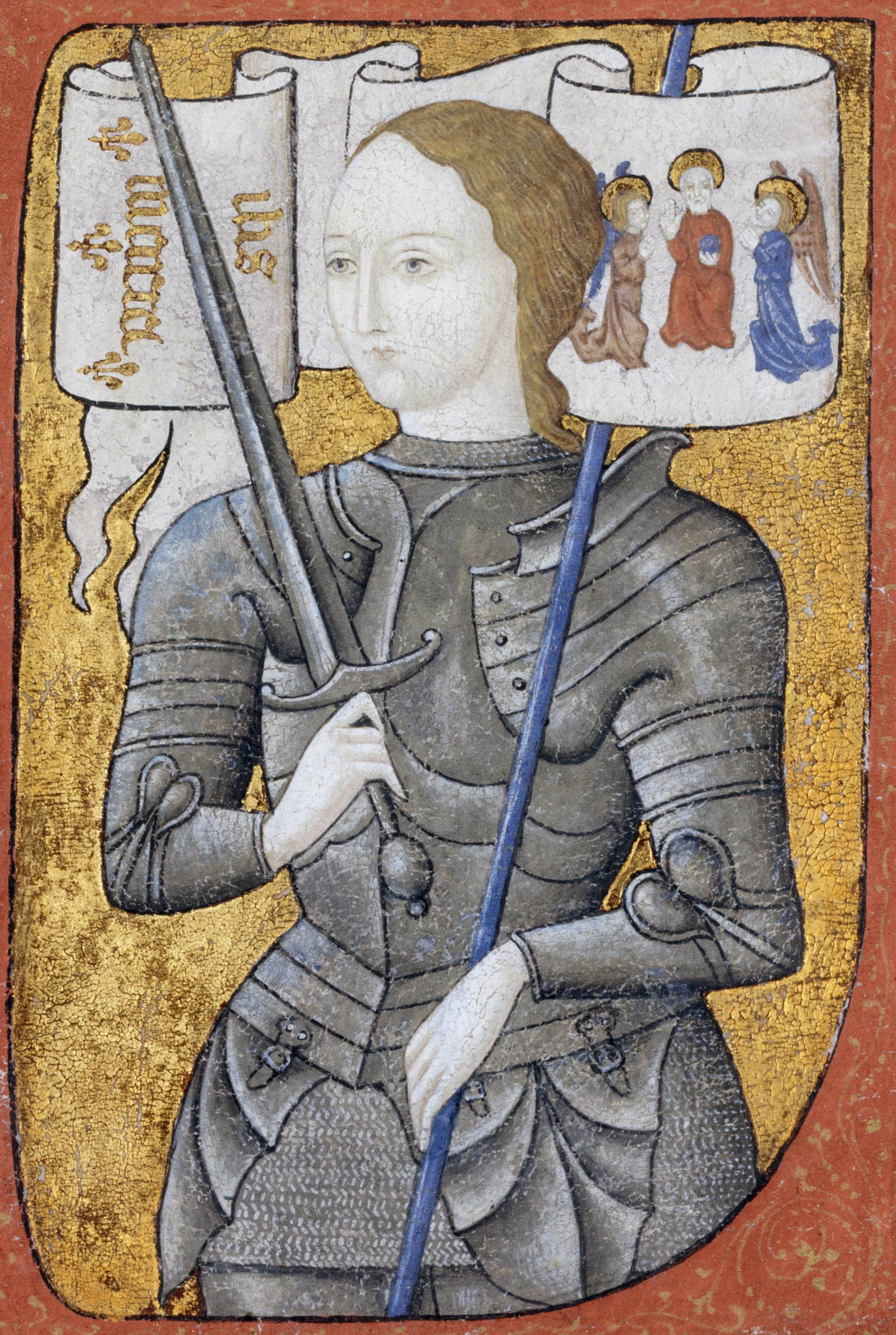
"Dark Ballet" contains a sample from The Nutcracker (1892) by Pyotr Ilyich Tchaikovsky (left) and was inspired by Joan of Arc (right).

In 2017, Madonna relocated to Lisbon, Portugal seeking a top football academy for her son David, who wanted to become a professional association football player. While living in the city, she began meeting artists, painters and musicians, who would invite her to "living room sessions". In these sessions, they would bring food, sit around the table and musicians would start playing instruments, singing fado and samba music. Finding herself "connected through music", the singer decided to create an album; "I found my tribe [in Lisbon] and a magical world of incredible musicians that reinforced my belief that music across the world is truly all connected and is the soul of the universe". On April 15, 2019, Madonna revealed Madame X as the album's title. For the album, she worked with longtime collaborator Mirwais, who had previously worked on her albums Music (2000), American Life (2003) and Confessions on a Dance Floor (2005), as well as Mike Dean, who was a producer on Rebel Heart (2015), and Diplo.

"Dark Ballet" was written and produced by Madonna and Mirwais, and samples Pyotr Ilyich Tchaikovsky's The Nutcracker (1892). It has been described as an experimental pop and electro-gospel piano ballad, with the vocals making use of a vocoder, and lyrics that address the singer's faith and "lifelong crusade against the patriarchal forces of religion, gender, and celebrity". In the opening verse, Madonna sings with "forceful confidence" the phrase "I can dress like a boy/I can dress like a girl" and, in an ironic tone, how "our world is obsessed with fame". Following a piano interlude, it morphs into a "sinister" and "mangled, glitching" fragment from The Nutcracker's Dance of the Reed Pipes, in which Madonna sings in a heavily edited robotic voice "I will not denounce the things that I have said/I will not renounce my faith in my sweet Lord". This last part, according to AllMusic's Stephen Thomas Erlewine, evokes Stanley Kubrick's 1971 film A Clockwork Orange. Madonna then utters the phrase "The storm isn't in the air/it's inside of us". The song ends with Madonna's daughters Stella and Estere blowing air through their lips, simulating wind. Madonna said the main inspiration of the song was Joan of Arc. During an interview with Rolling Stone, she explained that even after Joan of Arc won the fight against the English, the French were not pleased and "judged her". They affirmed she was a man, a lesbian, a witch, and "burned her at the stake", despite her being fearless. Madonna concluded, "I admire that". "Dark Ballet" was released the final promotional single from Madame X on June 7, 2019.

== Reception ==
"Dark Ballet" received generally positive reviews from music critics. Stephen Thomas Erlewine from AllMusic deemed it an "ominous number" and one of the highlights of Madame X. El Hunt from NME said it was "as villainous and foreboding as Ray of Light's darkest moments", and compared it to the singer's 2002 single "Die Another Day". Slant Magazine's Sal Cinquemani called its lyrical theme "Kafkaesque". Also from Slant Magazine, Alexa Camp praised the track for being "ambitious", as well as "a reminder of the wacky magic Madonna and Mirwais are capable of cooking up together". Variety's Jeremy Helligar deemed it, alongside "God Control", as one of the moments in Madame X where "true weirdness sets in", and "the closest Madonna may ever come to her own 'Bohemian Rhapsody'". Robbie Barnett from the Washington Blade, wrote that it was one of the album's "standout" tracks, as well as "a bold statement of extreme artistic expression". Gay Times' Daniel Megarry deemed it "arguably the most bizarre" song on Madonna's catalogue, as well as the fifth best song on Madame X.

For Nicolas Hautman, from Us Weekly, it's a "dark, glitchy number". The HuffPost's Daniel Welsh said "Dark Ballet" was the strangest song on the album, where the singer "takes the opportunity to let her detractors know that no matter what is thrown at her, she won’t be backing down". Louise Bruton from The Irish Times, stated that the song is "an experimental stand against authoritarianism". Johnny Coleman, from The Hollywood Reporter, noted that Madonna "does a decent Wendy Carlos impression" on "Dark Ballet". Sean Maunier, from Metro Weekly, called it an "infectiously weird track". Jaime Tabberer, from Gay Star News, compared it to Madonna's previous singles "Human Nature" (1995) and "What It Feels Like for a Girl" (2001), as all three songs exude "the same ferocious attitude" and touch on the themes of discrimination and sexism. Michael Arceneaux of NBC News called it one of the album's "oddities". On a negative review, Rich Juzwiak from Pitchfork said that "the 808 gloom of 'Dark Ballet' [...] is horrendous". The Chicago Sun-Times' Mark Kennedy wrote that the song "starts promising enough but drifts into a computer-altered pile of jumbled, pointless slogans". In the United Kingdom, "Dark Ballet" peaked at number 83 on the official downloads chart the week of June 14.

== Music video ==
Screenshot of the music video for "Dark Ballet, depicting Mykki Blanco as Joan of Arc getting burnt at the stake

The music video for "Dark Ballet" was released on June 7, 2019, and was directed by Dutch-Ghanaian director Emmanuel Adjei. It starred American rapper Mykki Blanco playing the role of a transgender Joan of Arc who gets burned at the stake. Madonna met Blanco through producer Mike Dean and became interested in working with her. After contacting her, Blanco flew to London and met her at her home. She had her listen to a finished version of the album and asked her to portray Joan of Arc in the video. Blanco is openly gay and HIV-positive, and Madonna felt she could relate to Joan's struggles; "if you had existed as you in her time — you would have been burned at the stake as well", she told her. According to Blanco, Madonna served as co-director and even worked on choreography, cinematography and costume design, but remained uncredited. On June 5, she shared two previews of the video on her Instagram account: one showed her wearing a veil, intercut with religious iconography, while the other depicted Blanco being burned.

The video opens with a quote by Joan of Arc: "One life is all we have and we live it as we believe in living it. But to sacrifice what you are and to live without belief, that is a fate more terrible than dying". Told in a nonlinear narrative, it begins with Blanco held captive in a stone cell, she's wearing a dirty white robe with her wrists bound. She's then led by "stone faced" clergymen to her execution as she sings along to the lyrics. Blanco is then seen dancing, first in a cathedral wearing a gold corset, similar to the one Madonna wore on her Blond Ambition World Tour (1990), pleading with the men to spare her, and then at an altar. The final shot is of a naked Blanco, her head shaved off, being burned at the stake while a bunch of veiled nuns, one of them Madonna, look from below. The video ends with an "inspiring" quote from Blanco: "I have walked this earth, Black, Queer and HIV positive, but no transgression against me has been as powerful as the hope I hold within".

It received positive reviews from critics. Althea Legaspi from Rolling Stone, called it "cinematic". Alexa Camp noted a "blink-and-you'll-miss-it" shot from Carl Theodor Dreyer's 1928 film The Passion of Joan of Arc at the very beginning. She also saw similarities to Madonna's 1989 video for "Like a Prayer", specifically in the use of religious imagery and the story revolving around a persecuted black person. Camp concluded that by casting a person of color and not herself as "the oppressed", Madonna was highlighting "the disproportionate impact of the patriarchy on minorities". For Paper's Justin Moran "[Mykki Blanco's] take on Joan of Arc mirrors how his own everyday relishes the in-between", also pointing out the singer's absence in the video. Mike Wass hailed the video as a "gothic nightmare" and "eerie". According to CNN's Chloe Melas, the video was "fresh proof that Madonna has never been afraid to push the limits". In June 2019, it was named by Billboard as one of "The 20 Best Music Videos of 2019 (So Far)".

== Live performances ==
Madonna first performed "Dark Ballet", known then as "Beautiful Game", at the 2018 Met Gala. After singing "Like a Prayer" and a cover of Leonard Cohen's "Hallelujah" (1984), she began singing the song wearing a corset and a metallic arm accessory, her hair was braided and parted down the center. Several dancers, wearing similar costumes, performed a choreography that seemed to control and restrain her movements. A fragment of "Dark Ballet" was included during Madonna's performance of "Future" and "Like a Prayer" as an interval act in the final of the Eurovision Song Contest 2019. The song was then included on the singer's Madame X Tour (2019−20), where it was the second song of the setlist. The performance featured "Joan of Arc references, religious garb and battles with dancers in gas masks reminiscent of the mice in The Nutcracker", as well as a ballet breakdown halfway through. At one point, the singer gets pushed off a piano by one of the dancers. Billboard's Joe Lynch praised the number's "compelling mixture of Christian iconography and pagan pageantry". The performance was included on the live album Madame X: Music from the Theater Xperience.

On October 9, 2021, following the release of the Madame X concert film, Madonna gave an "intimate cabaret performance" in the basement of Marcus Samuelsson's Harlem restaurant Red Rooster, and sang Lounge renditions of "Dark Ballet", "La Isla Bonita" (1987), Madame X album track "Crazy", and Cape Verdean coladeira song "Sodade"; she was dressed in a black cocktail dress with a "dramatic leg slit", lace gloves and long blonde wig.

== Credits and personnel ==
- Madonna – writer, vocals, producer
- Mirwais – writer, producer

Credits and personnel adapted from the Madame X album liner notes.

== Charts ==
Chart (2019)	Peak position
UK Singles Downloads (Official Charts)	83

== Release history ==
Country	Date	Format(s)	Label	Ref.
Various	June 7, 2019	Digital download; streaming	Interscope	
