= Future (song) =

Promotional single by Madonna and Quavo

from the album Madame X
- Released: May 17, 2019
- Genre: Roots reggae; hip hop; electro-ragga
- Length: 3:53
- Label: Interscope
- Songwriters: Madonna; Starrah; Quavo; Diplo
- Producers: Madonna; Diplo

"Future" is a song by American singer-songwriter Madonna and American rapper Quavo, from her fourteenth studio album Madame X (2019). The track was written by Madonna, Diplo, Quavo and Starrah, and was produced by the former two. "Future" was released as the second promotional single from the album on May 17, 2019, by Interscope Records. Musically it was described as a roots reggae and hip hop song, while lyrically it deals about looking to what is ahead, celebrating the present and also contemplating the past.

"Future" received positive to mixed reviews from music critics; some deemed it catchy while others felt it was not memorable enough. The track also had a moderate commercial reception, reaching the top 30 in Hungary and peaking at number 50 in Scotland. Madonna performed the song during the Eurovision Song Contest 2019 finale, causing controversy as it featured two dancers with Palestinian and Israeli flags on their costumes; this was seen as a political statement on the Israeli–Palestinian conflict. Later, the singer included "Future" on her 2019−20 Madame X Tour.

== Background and composition ==
In 2017, Madonna relocated to Lisbon, Portugal seeking a top football academy for her son David, who wanted to become a professional association football player. While living in the city, she began meeting artists, painters and musicians, who would invite her to "living room sessions". In these sessions, they would bring food, sit around the table and musicians would start playing instruments, singing fado and samba music. Finding herself "connected through music", the singer decided to create an album; "I found my tribe [in Lisbon] and a magical world of incredible musicians that reinforced my belief that music across the world is truly all connected and is the soul of the universe". On April 15, 2019, Madonna revealed Madame X as the album's title. For the album, she worked with longtime collaborator Mirwais, who had previously worked on her albums Music (2000), American Life (2003) and Confessions on a Dance Floor (2005), as well as Mike Dean, who was a producer on Rebel Heart (2015), and Diplo.

"Future" was written by Madonna alongside Diplo, Quavo and Starrah, and was produced by the former two. It has been described as a roots reggae, hip hop, and electro-ragga song, heavily influenced by dancehall. Lyrically, according to the singer, it is about "the world that we live in today and the future of our civilization". It begins with Madonna singing "You ain't woke" with vocals heavily worked by Auto-Tune, and a "slight, perhaps unconscious but audible white-person" Jamaican accent. During the chorus, she sings: "Not everyone can come into the future/Not everyone that's here is gonna last", in a "hopeful" tone about shedding any recent negativity. Then, Quavo raps while reflecting on his current status and looking forward to what is to come: "My life is gold/I drip in ice/I see the signs/Just free your mind/Welcome to the future, it's a culture ride". The song includes a lyrical nod to Madonna's 2000 single "Don't Tell Me", with the line "Don't tell me to stop/'cause you said so". "Future" was released as the second promotional single from Madame X on May 17, 2019.

== Critical reception ==
"Future" received positive to mixed reviews from music critics. Asian News International noted that Madonna and Quavo's voices "blend together perfectly", while also commented that "with its catchy lyrics and upbeat tune, ['Future'] is sure to make way into playlists". The Irish Times' Louise Bruton called "Future" a "sun-kissed call for progress". Trey Alston from MTV was positive, calling it a "surprising, ecstatic new record", and praised the "surprisingly funky" collaboration between Madonna and Quavo. Nick Smith from musicOMH complimented the song as being "dark and trippy", also pointing out "Diplo's fingerprints all over it". Paul Nolan from Hot Press was also positive, deeming it an album standout. Ben Beaumont-Thomas from The Guardian commented that the track was "her go at pop's next big trend, roots reggae", calling it "catchy and full-bodied". However, he criticized Diplo for "shamelessly ripping off" the brass from Outkast's "SpottieOttieDopaliscious" (1998). Another positive review came from Gay Times's Daniel Megarry, who said he had "grown to love it", and commented that its "reggae-tinged beats and optimistic lyrics" would help sell the track.

Michael Arceneaux of NBC News considered Quavo's appearance as "surprising". Alfred Soto from City Pages wrote that the track "unfurls as listeners might expect", and selected it as one of the "OK to pretty good songs" on Madame X. Variety's Jeremy Helligar criticized its lyrics for being "cliché" and said that they "go low when [Madonna] should be aiming higher". Kitty Empire of The Observer criticized the lack of chemistry between Madonna and Quavo, an opinion that was shared by New York's Craig Jenkins. On a more negative review, Rich Juzwiak from Pitchfork said that "[Madonna] warbles through Auto-Tune and adopts a contemporary hip-hop posture that ends up just sounding like a flat sort of honking out of her nose. It's not so much that she's riffing on hip-hop that's the problem [...] it's that she's being smarmy as she does it". Nicholas Hautman from Us Weekly, dismissed "Future" as "forgettable" and one of Madame X's "filler" tracks. On a similar note, Jonny Coleman from The Hollywood Reporter also deemed it forgettable and said it sounded like a "Rihanna leftover".

== Commercial performance ==
"Future" debuted at number 40 on the foreign language songs chart in China, later reaching its peak at number 20. On 24 May 2019, the track debuted at its peak of number 50 Scotland. Also in Hungary, "Future" peaked at number 30. The track peaked at numbers 16 and 33, on the French Digital and UK Download charts, respectively. It also reached number 20 on the Euro Digital Songs chart, compiled by Billboard.

== Live performances ==
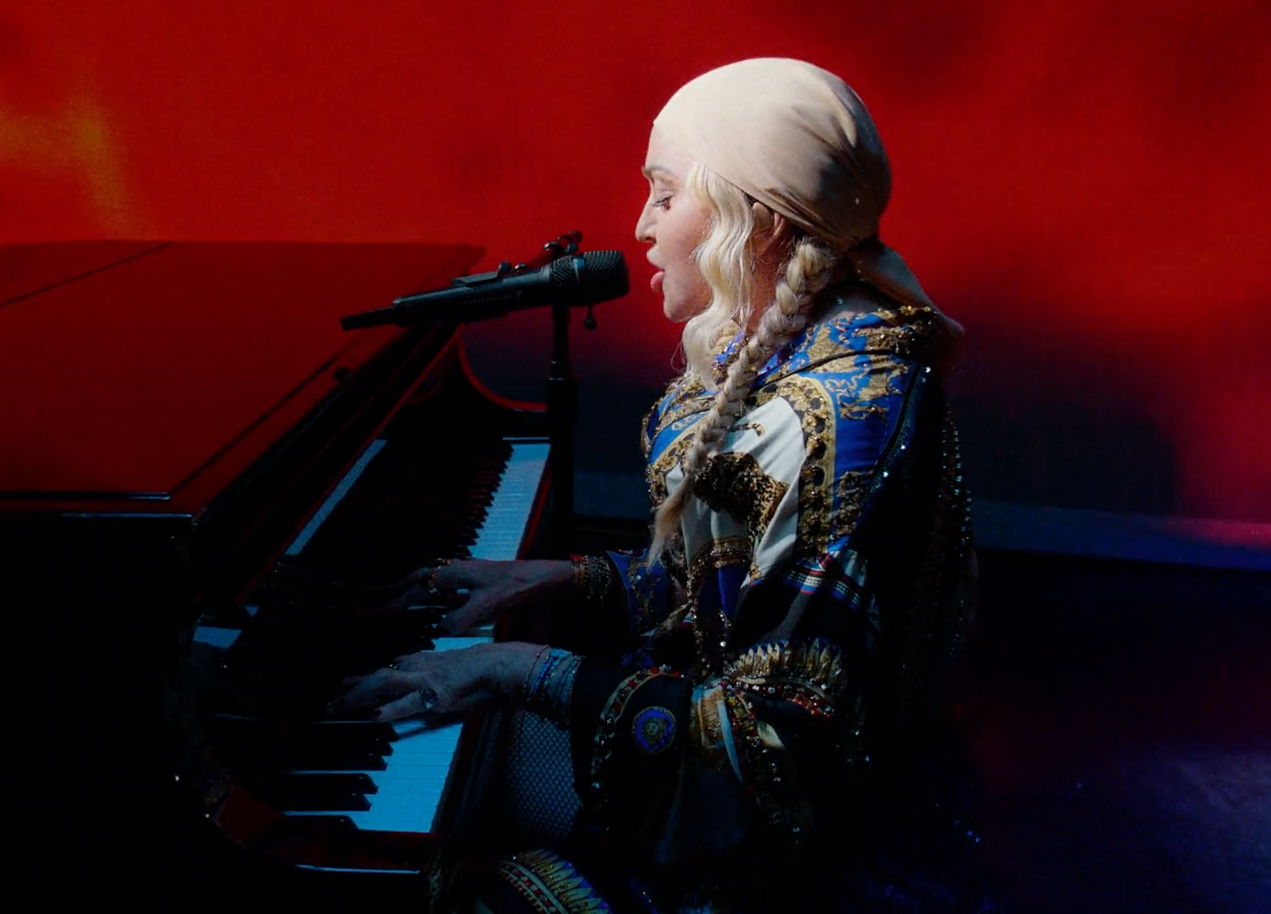
Madonna singing "Future" on the piano during her Madame X Tour (2019–2020)

On April 9, 2019, it was announced by local promoters Live Nation Israel that Madonna would perform at the Eurovision Song Contest 2019 finale, stating she would "perform two songs, including a new song from her upcoming album". However, on May 14, Eurovision's then-executive supervisor Jon Ola Sand said they hadn't confirmed the singer's appearance as there was no "signed contract". The appearance was officially confirmed two days before the finale. Madonna performed "Future", along with her 1989 single "Like a Prayer", during the event, held on Tel Aviv on May 18. For the performance, Madonna was joined by Quavo and wore a black cape and eyepatch with the letter X while several dancers, who wore gas masks, fell to the ground. Halfway through, Madonna sang a fragment of her song "Dark Ballet". Also featured on the performance, were two dancers with Palestinian and Israeli flags on their backs holding each other. It ended with the phrase "Wake Up" being projected on a black screen, before Madonna fell backwards off the stage, hand-in-hand with Quavo.

The performance caused controversy, as it was seen as a political statement for the Israeli–Palestinian conflict. Eurovision organizers said that part of the performance was not an approved part of the act; the European Broadcasting Union (EBU) released a statement saying Eurovision was a non-political event and that Madonna had been made aware. The Palestinian Campaign for the Academic and Cultural Boycott of Israel (PACBI), along with other artists such as Roger Waters and Brian Eno, had previously called for a boycott of the Eurovision Song Contest in support of Palestine, and even urged Madonna not to perform. Madonna said that she was never going to "stop playing music to suit someone's political agenda", to which the PACBI responded; "artwashing Israel's brutal oppression of Palestinians for a million dollars must be among the most immoral political agendas". Later, the Kan Israel Broadcasting Corporation sued Live Nation over the performance, claiming the singer's representatives had violated the terms of their agreement and "reneged on financial promises". CNN's Holly Thomas expressed that Madonna "didn't do or say much besides create an obtuse spectacle against the backdrop of a frankly terrible song" and "offered her audience no meaningful education of the conflict she alluded to". In addition to the controversy, the singer was criticized for her vocal performance; Netherlands announcer Emma Wortelboer quipped she was "thankful for Madonna's autotune" during the results segment of the competition. One day later, a video of the performance was uploaded to the singer's official YouTube account, this time her vocals were edited.

Madonna included "Future" in the setlist for her 2019−20 Madame X Tour. She played the piano, flanked by a pair of "robotic but sinuous" dancers with red lights on their eyes, while images of "urban and environmental destruction" and the word "warning" were projected on the video screen. Paper's Bradley Stern described the performance as "a more muted piano piece", compared to the "medieval-meets-post-apocalyptic moment on Eurovision". The performance was included on the live album Madame X: Music from the Theater Xperience.

== Credits and personnel ==
- Madonna – writer, vocals, producer
- patsmusicrop BMI
- Diplo – writer, producer
- Quavo – writer, vocals
- Starrah – writer

Credits and personnel adapted from the Madame X album liner notes.

== Charts ==
Chart (2019)	Peak position
China Airplay (Billboard China)	20
Euro Digital Song Sales (Billboard)	20
France Downloads (SNEP)	16
Germany Downloads (Official German Charts)	24
Israel (Media Forest)	9
Hungary (Single Top 40)	30
Scottish Singles Sales (Official Charts)	50
UK Singles Downloads (Official Charts)	33

== Release history ==
Country	Date	Format(s)	Label	Ref.
Various	May 18, 2019	Digital download; streaming	Interscope	
Russia	May 21, 2019	Contemporary hit radio	Universal	
