= God Control =

2019 song by Madonna

Song by Madonna

from the album Madame X
- Released: June 14, 2019
- Genre: Experimental pop; disco; hi-NRG; electropop
- Length: 6:19
- Label: Interscope
- Songwriters: Madonna; Mirwais Ahmadzaï; Casey Spooner
- Producers: Madonna; Mirwais; Mike Dean

Music video
- "God Control" on YouTube

"God Control" is a song by American singer-songwriter Madonna from her fourteenth studio album, Madame X (2019). It was written by Madonna, longtime collaborator Mirwais, and American musician Casey Spooner. Madonna and Mirwais produced the song along with Mike Dean. Lyrically the song talks about gun control and also touches on the political climate of the United States at the time. It is an experimental pop, disco, hi-NRG and electropop song and features the Tiffin Children's Chorus repeating "We lost god control" all throughout. In the music video, we can see Madonna typing "we lost gun control" and not "god control" as the song title suggests.

It received positive reviews from music critics, who deemed it one of the best songs of the album. On June 26, an accompanying music video directed by Jonas Åkerlund was released; it interspersed footage of Madonna as her alter ego Madame X with scenes of a nightclub where a shooting takes place. The video was reminiscent of the 2016 Orlando nightclub shooting and was criticized by the media and the survivors of the massacre. However, it was praised by some gun control advocates. Madonna performed "God Control" during her appearance at Stonewall 50 – WorldPride NYC 2019, and as the opening number of her 2019−20 Madame X Tour.

== Background and composition ==
In 2017, Madonna relocated to Lisbon, Portugal, seeking a top soccer academy for her son David, who wanted to become a professional soccer player. While living in the city, she began meeting artists, painters and musicians, who would invite her to "living room sessions". In these sessions, they would bring food, sit around the table and musicians would start playing instruments, singing fado and samba music. Finding herself "connected through music", the singer decided to create an album; "I found my tribe [in Lisbon] and a magical world of incredible musicians that reinforced my belief that music across the world is truly all connected and is the soul of the universe". On April 15, 2019, Madonna revealed Madame X as the album's title. For the album, she worked with longtime collaborator Mirwais Ahmadzaï, who had previously worked on her albums Music (2000), American Life (2003) and Confessions on a Dance Floor (2005), as well as Mike Dean, who served as a producer on Rebel Heart (2015), and Diplo.

"God Control" was written by Madonna and Mirwais and produced by the latter two along with Mike Dean. It has been described as an experimental pop, disco, hi-NRG and electropop song. Lyrically, it talks about gun control, as well as democracy and the political state of the United States. Musically, it's been described as an "euphoric, densely layered samba-disco-gospel mash-up" with violins and a retro sound. It features a gospel choir, gunshot sounds and vocodered vocals. The song begins with Madonna singing "Everybody knows the damn truth/Our nation lied and lost respect" in a "clenched teeth" style, followed by the Tiffin Children's Chorus repeating the phrase "we lost gun control". It is followed by a "schmaltzy" chorus inspired by Philadelphia soul in which Madonna sings "It's a hustle" amid backing verses about "a new democracy". On one particular section, there is a rap;– compared by some critics to the vocal style she used on her 1990 album I'm Breathless and electronic duo Daft Punk – to sing "Each new birth it gives me hope / that's why I don't smoke that dope" and talks about her brain being "her only friend".

=== Songwriting claim ===
In November 2019, Casey Spooner claimed he had been a co-writer on "God Control" but was never credited or compensated for it. Spooner said he had created the song's melody when Mirwais asked him to rewrite the lyrics and mix the audio of a demo for his solo album, in which he wanted to sing in English about American politics. Soon afterwards, Mirwais abandoned the project to go work with Madonna; Spooner expressed interest in working with the singer but never received a response. When Spooner first heard the melody to "God Control", he felt it was too similar to the one he had created and accused the producer of using his work without permission; he then posted a snippet, comparing both songs, on his Instagram account. According to Spooner, once Madonna heard this, she contacted him claiming she was unaware of his contributions, and offered him $10,000 as an advance – which was later increased to $25,000 – as well as 15% of writing credits and royalties. Spooner turned this down, as he claimed he would only receive $10,000 of the $25,000 settlement after covering taxes and his legal fees. He also claimed that "there's no money in record sales. Not even for Madonna", and demanded he be paid 1% of the singer's touring profits to "cover [my] contribution and damages".

== Critical reception ==
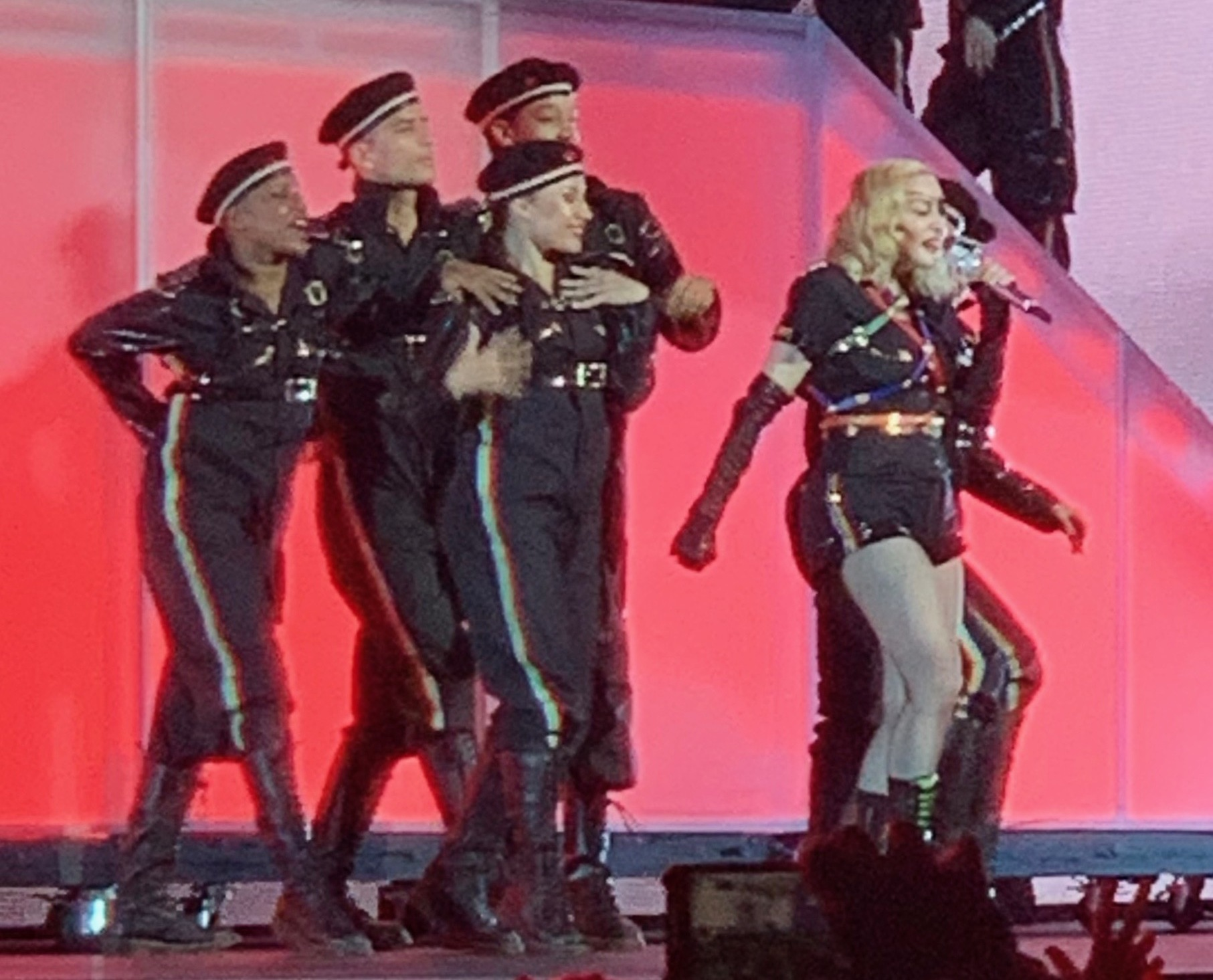
Madonna, flanked by her dancers, singing "God Control" during her appearance at Stonewall 50 – WorldPride NYC 2019

The track received positive reviews from music critics. Stephen Thomas Erlewine from AllMusic, wrote that "darkness hangs heavy [on the album], surfacing fiercely in the clenched-mouth phrasing on 'God Control'." Variety's Jeremy Helligar deemed it, alongside previous track "Dark Ballet", as one of the moments in Madame X where "true weirdness sets in", and "the closest Madonna may ever come to her own 'Bohemian Rhapsody'." Ben Beaumont-Thomas, from The Guardian, called it one of the album's "shockers suitable only for schadenfreude lovers or scholars of extreme camp." He further concluded that "it is – only just – brilliant, and will become an equally beloved and despised curio among fans". Rolling Stone's Rob Sheffield hailed it as "a rare moment of Madonna understatement". Louise Bruton from The Irish Times, stated that the song is "an experimental stand against authoritarianism and gun control through distorted Black Mirror-style pop ... to basically shake our shoulders and tell us to wake up, sheeple". Samuel R. Murrian from Parade ranked it at number 96 on his list of the singer's 100 greatest songs. According to Nicolas Hautman from Us Weekly, "God Control" is Madonna's "most daring and epic" song since 2012's "Gang Bang".

Gay Times' Daniel Megarry deemed it "creative, dance-able and unexpected ... pure perfection", as well as the best song on the album. Jonny Coleman from The Hollywood Reporter called the track a "a six-plus-minute odyssey". Paper's Bradley Stern described it as a "happy-go-lucky disco ode to gun control". While reviewing Madame X for The Independent, Alexandra Pollard said "God Control" was an "attack on America's feeble gun-control laws". Sal Cinquemani, from Slant Magazine, opined it was the "album's pièce de résistance", as well as "the most exhilaratingly batshit thing she's done in years". For The Atlantic's Spencer Kornhaber, it felt "like a few songs in one". Nonetheless, he called it an "irresistible take on Philadelphia soul" and praised it for being both "a camp commentary on the way people can dance in the face of crisis" and "catchy and amusing". Wren Graves, from online magazine Consequence of Sound, listed "God Control" as one of the standout tracks in Madame X; "Madonna's ambitions aren't merely musical. Several songs [on the album] contain social messages with varying amounts of bite ... But the message is even better expressed on the ambitious 'God Control'." HuffPost's Daniel Welsh opined it was one of the album's "party tracks tinged with sadness". Robbie Barnett from the Washington Blade compared it to Madonna's 2000 songs "Music" and "Impressive Instant", calling it "perfectly fit for dance floor consumption", the singer's best dance track since "Hung Up" (2005), as well as the best song on the album. On a less favorable note, Rich Juzwiak from Pitchfork said it was "supposed to be fun, but it's exhausting".

In March 2023, Billboard ranked "God Control" as Madonna's 89th greatest song, with Joe Lynch writing that "this unusual odyssey announced that Madonna was far from finished when it comes to taking risks and speaking her mind."

== Music video ==
=== Background and synopsis ===
Screenshot of the "God Control" music video, depicting a dead, blood spattered Madonna just after a shooting broke out at a nightclub

During an interview with People, Madonna said one of the main reasons she made a video for "God Control" were her kids; "I send my children to school with the same fear every mother in this era has [...] It's really scary to me that the once-safe spaces where we gather, worship and learn are targets. Nobody's safe". In another statement, she said that also wanted to draw attention to an ongoing problem in America. Regarding those who could criticize it for being too graphic, she answered: "this is what happens. Guns kill".

The music video for "God Control" was released on June 26, 2019. It was directed by Jonas Åkerlund, who had previously worked with Madonna in videos such as "Ray of Light" (1998), "Music" (2000), "American Life" (2003) and "Bitch I'm Madonna" (2015). It counted with the appearances of drag queen Monét X Change, actress Sofia Boutella, and YouTuber Gigi Gorgeous. It opens with a text reading "The story you are about to see is very disturbing. It shows graphic scenes of gun violence. But it's happening every day. And it has to stop". Told through flashbacks in reverse chronological order, it begins with Madonna as her alter ego Madame X, wearing a short black wig and sitting at a typewriter typing the song's lyrics, interspersed with footage of the shooting at a New York Studio 54-like nightclub. These scenes were said to have evoked the 2016 Orlando nightclub and 2018 Thousand Oaks shootings. The video then moves backwards in time and shows Madonna getting ready to go out; she's wearing a 1970s-inspired gold pantsuit and a blonde bob wig. Other scenes feature Madonna being assaulted on her way to the nightclub, a children's choir singing at a church vigil and footage of protests against guns and the National Rifle Association of America (NRA). It ends with the phrase "Wake Up", and a quote from civil rights activist and Black Panther member Angela Davis, "I am no longer accepting the things I cannot change. I am changing the things I cannot accept".

=== Reception ===
"This is your wake up call. Gun violence disproportionately affects children, teenagers and the marginalized in our communities … Honor the victims and demand GUN CONTROL. NOW. Volunteer, stand up, donate, reach out. Wake up and insist on common-sense gun safety legislation … Innocent lives depend on it."

— Madonna talking about the "God Control" music video on her Twitter account.

The video was criticized for its depiction of violence. Ryan Reed from Rolling Stone, said it touched the theme of society's inability to restrict gun ownership, and that certain scenes were a contrast of "the joy of nightclub dancing" and "the brutality of a mass shooting". Slant Magazine's Alexa Camp noted similarities to the original music video for "American Life"; while that one was a "satire of modern society's consumption of war as popular entertainment", "'God Control' depicts the carnage weapons of war can wreak here at home". Camp also highlighted easter eggs, including some to Madonna videos from the past. The scene in which the singer is assaulted could be seen as a reference to her 1989 video for "Like a Prayer", in which Madonna witnesses a young woman being sexually attacked by a group of men. The shot of a crucifix seemingly crying blood was another reference to "Like a Prayer", according to Camp. The author also pointed out framed photos of Frida Kahlo, Simone de Beauvoir, Patti Smith and Martha Graham hanging on the walls around Madonna's desk; this last one, according to the artist, christened her with the nickname "Madame X" in the late 1970s.

Christopher Rudolph from The Backlot called it a "disturbing disco bloodbath". Spencer Kornhaben said that the graphic tones of the video took away the song's "ambiguity and subtext", and criticized it for glamourizing trauma and "amplifying it", without "pushing the conversation anywhere new". He concluded: "people unsympathetic to Madonna's cause are not likely to be moved; people sympathetic to her cause are left feeling drained". Gay Times' Daniel Megarry called it the singer's "most shocking [video] yet". Billboard's Sal Cinquemani listed "God Control" as one of Madonna's nine most controversial videos. Idolator named it the best music video of 2019; Mike Nied said it showed Madonna was still capable of "creating work that is both visually striking and capable of speaking to larger cultural issues". Shannon Watts, who founded Moms Demand Action, thanked Madonna for raising awareness about the horrors of gun violence. Actor George Takei, who set up the anti-gun group 1Pulse4America after the Orlando shooting, and March for Our Lives, the lobby group founded after the Stoneman Douglas High School shooting, were among those who praised the singer and the video. Patience Carter, survivor of the Orlando shooting, tweeted: "I applaud the attempt, but I am truly disturbed". Similarly, fellow survivor Brandon Wolf said that he appreciated the message, but felt the singer was using the tragedy and the victims as "props". X González, Stoneman Douglas High School shooting survivor, panned the video for being "fucked up and horrible".

== Live performances ==
Madonna first performed "God Control" during her appearance at Stonewall 50 – WorldPride NYC 2019; she wore an eye-patch with an X, which was designed in the colors of the rainbow flag, while her background dancers were decked as police officers wielding combat shields. Billboard praised the "visually powerful live performance ... replete with detailed choreography and a disco groove that had the crowd gyrating and shimmying". The song was then performed as the opening number of the singer's Madame X Tour. The show began with a quote by James Baldwin: "Art is here to prove that all safety is an illusion... Artists are here to disturb the peace". Then, a silhouetted woman sat at a typewriter; each key press sounding like a gunshot, accompanied by a dancer jerking and flinching as if he's been shot. Madonna then appeared, decked in a glittery Revolutionary War attire and a feathered tricorne hat, to sing the song while being bounced between two police officers' shields; the performance featured two staircases, that moved and dismantled throughout the show, and cops attacking dancers under a video montage of news footage. On her review of one of the concert at Los Angeles' Wiltern Theatre, Kelli Syke Fadroski opined that "it was a bit unnerving to hear dozens of gunshot sound effects echo through a very dark venue. But that was the point". The performance was included on the live album Madame X: Music from the Theater Xperience.

== Credits and personnel ==
- Madonna – writer, vocals, producer
- Mirwais – writer, producer
- Casey Spooner – writer
- Mike Dean – producer
- Tiffin Children's Chorus – backing vocals

Credits and personnel adapted from the Madame X album liner notes.
