= Celebration (Madonna album) =

- Deluxe edition cover (Note: The standard edition features the same artwork but with a beige background.)

Greatest hits album by Madonna
- Released: September 18, 2009
- Recorded: 1982–2009
- Genre: Pop
- Length: 78:47
- Label: Warner Bros.
- Producers: Madonna; DJ Frank E; Paul Oakenfold (new tracks)

Madonna chronology
Hard Candy (2008)	Celebration (2009)	Sticky & Sweet Tour (2010)

Singles from Celebration
- 1. "Celebration" Released: July 31, 2009; 2. "Revolver" Released: December 14, 2009

Celebration is the third greatest hits album by American singer-songwriter Madonna, released on September 18, 2009, by Warner Bros. Records. The album features 34 songs spanning Madonna's career from the 1980s to the 2000s, after she signed with the label in 1982. It also includes three new songs: "Celebration" which is included on all versions, "Revolver" which is included on the two-disc editions, and "It's So Cool" which is included as a bonus track on some digital two-disc editions. A fourth song, "Broken", was recorded for the album but not used; eventually it was released in 2012 as a limited edition promotional vinyl single for fan club members. The music video compilation Celebration: The Video Collection was simultaneously released with the album on DVD.

Celebration received acclaim from critics, who noted the vastness of Madonna's back catalog. The album debuted at the top of the charts in Belgium, Canada, Ireland, Italy, Mexico and the United Kingdom. Madonna tied Elvis Presley as the solo artist with the most number-one albums in the United Kingdom. In the United States, it debuted at number seven in the Billboard 200; in other nations, it also debuted within the top ten, peaking in the top three in most of them. The title track was released as the album's first single. It became Madonna's 40th number-one song on Billboard's Hot Dance Club Songs chart. "Revolver" was released as the second single from the album in some territories, but did not achieve significant commercial success.

== Background and release ==
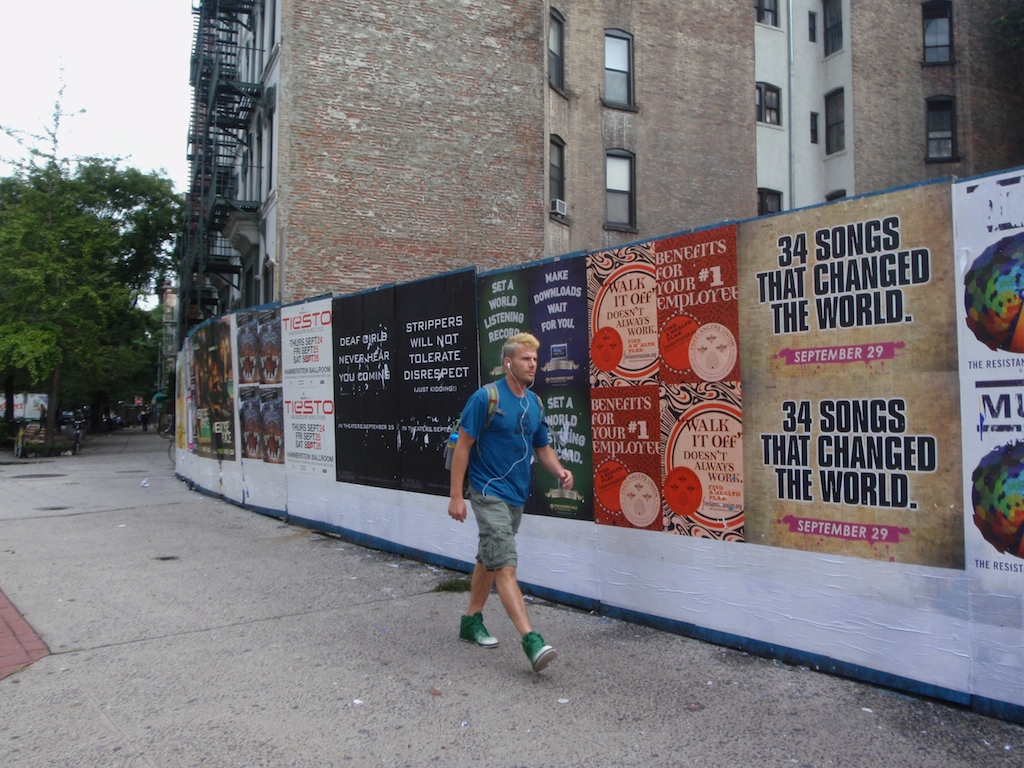
Flyposting for Celebration: "34 songs that changed the world" in Queens, NYC, New York in September 2009

On March 18, 2009, Madonna's publicist Liz Rosenberg announced plans to release a greatest hits package by September. She added that Madonna planned to go into the studio to record new material for the album. The next day, Madonna's manager, Guy Oseary, asked fans on his Twitter for input regarding the track listing of the greatest hits album. It was later confirmed that she wrote three new tracks for the album, with Paul Oakenfold confirmed as the producer of two of them. Attitude magazine reported in an interview with Oakenfold that the tracks he produced with Madonna were titled "Broken (I'm Sorry)" and "Celebrate". He stated that the new music is "lyrically classic Madonna with an edgy modern sound." Her official website also confirmed the inclusion of the track "Revolver", featuring rapper Lil Wayne, when it announced the final track listing for the CD and DVD on August 26, 2009. With The Times, Madonna shared her thoughts on the release:

The song comes first. And all of those other things that people remember, the imagistic things, are secondary, or certainly not as important. But I think I’ve become pretty good at sussing out when people's opinions of my work are coming from what they think of me personally. You just have to do your thing and then let it go out into the world. The rest, you're not in control.

On July 22, 2009, Warner Bros. Records officially announced the release date as September 28, 2009 and confirmed the album's title as Celebration through Madonna's official website. "Celebration" was released as the lead single on July 31, 2009. Two editions of the compilation were released: a 36-track two-disc edition and an 18-track one-disc edition. The songs on the compilation were digitally remastered and selected by Madonna and her fans, covering the breadth of her career. The two-disc edition includes every track from The Immaculate Collection (1990), except for "Rescue Me". A music video compilation titled Celebration: The Video Collection was released on DVD, and contains 47 music videos, including several that had not previously appeared on a video release, such as "Into the Groove" and "Hung Up", as well as the music video for "Celebration". The cover of Celebration was created by street pop artist Mr. Brainwash who is best known for "throwing modern cultural icons into a blender and turning it up to eleven". Celebration was made available for pre-order on the iTunes Store on September 1, 2009, to coincide with the music video release of "Celebration". An iTunes-exclusive deluxe video edition adds 30 music videos from Madonna's videography. A vinyl LP edition was released on December 22, 2009, and reissued on March 1, 2024.

== Critical reception ==
Professional ratings
Aggregate scores
Source	Rating
Metacritic	84/100
Review scores
Source	Rating
AllMusic	4.5/5 stars
Entertainment Weekly	A
The Daily Telegraph	4/5 stars
Digital Spy	5/5 stars
Gaffa	5/6 stars
Houston Chronicle	3.5/4 stars
Jenesaispop	8/10
Pitchfork	5.7/10
Rolling Stone	4/5 stars
Slant Magazine	4/5 stars

Celebration received a score of 84 out of 100 at Metacritic, indicating "universal acclaim" from critics. Sarah Crompton from The Daily Telegraph gave the collection four out of five stars and said: "Madonna's Celebration shows just how consistently she delivers the goods, with tracks such as 'Music', 'Ray of Light', 'Frozen' and 'Don't Tell Me'", with "only a couple of [songs] which feel dispensable." Eric Henderson of Slant Magazine gave the compilation four out of five stars and commented that "functionally, what Madonna and fans are really celebrating with the release of Celebration is the hard proof that Madonna's back catalog is now so immense and so varied that she can release a behemoth, two-disc greatest hits package that shoehorns in 36 songs and still manages to significantly short-change the singer's legacy", though he also noted that "the album is missing songs, doesn't always include the right ones, [and] seems to have been sequenced by a not particularly intuitive Genius playlist." Tim Sendra from AllMusic wrote that "the collection does a fine job of living up to the title — it's certainly a celebration of Madonna's career and includes some of the most celebratory and thrilling pop music ever created", but criticized the use of edited and remixed versions, as well as the nonchronological sequencing.

Rob Sheffield from Rolling Stone noted that "Celebration kicks off with pure bliss and never lets up. It's a dizzying, nonchronological spin through the Madonna years, years it makes you feel lucky to be living through. Her hitmaking genius is unmatched and [...] undiminished." However, Sheffield called the omission of "Angel" "just plain crazypants." Leah Greenblatt from Entertainment Weekly commented that the album "holds up surprisingly well". Joey Guerra from Houston Chronicle praised the album, saying "every song on Celebration defines a moment in time, a radio sing-along, a twirl under the glitterball. It's a pulsing testament to Madonna's often-overlooked pop prowess, from the scrappy electro beginnings of 'Everybody' and 'Burning Up' to the retro-disco swirl of 'Beautiful Stranger' and 'Hung Up', still a hands-in-the-air highlight."

Alan Woodhouse from NME gave the compilation an unfavorable review, describing Madonna's career as having two distinct phases: her "80s output" and her later career, and her later career, or "phaze two". He summarized the album by saying that "Madonna clearly thinks this collection represents a celebration of her longevity [...] in reality all it does is expose her more recent failings", though Woodhouse also called it "unfair to say Madge hasn't touched magic since 1990" citing "Hung Up" and "Ray of Light" as exceptions. Douglas Wolk, from Pitchfork, reviewed the album similarly, also comparing her early work with her later material, stating that "'Hung Up' is really the only song from the post-GHV2 period that's lodged in the American pop consciousness", concluding that "[Madonna] deserves a retrospective more interesting than this haphazard piece of contract-filling product", while praising the opening sequence, calling that "incredibly strong, a convincing argument for her genius."

== Commercial performance ==
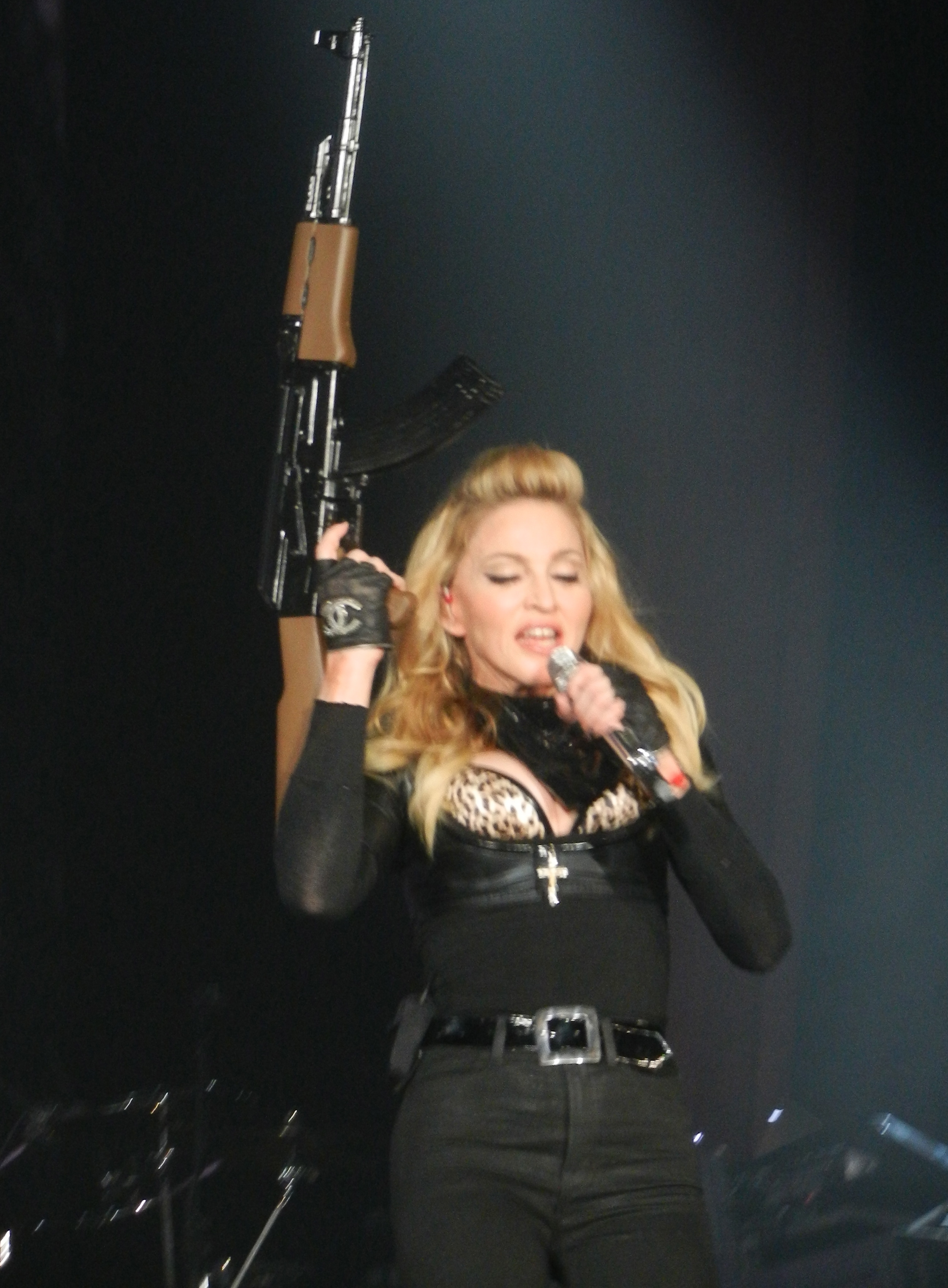
During The MDNA Tour (2012), "Revolver" was performed as the second song of the show.

Worldwide, Celebration has sold about four million copies. In the United States, Celebration debuted at number seven, with 72,000 copies sold in its first week. It was present on the chart for a total of 12 weeks and was certified gold by the Recording Industry Association of America (RIAA) on November 23, 2009, indicating shipment of 500,000 units. In April 2010, the album got a boost in sales from the Glee episode titled "The Power of Madonna". The album re-entered the Billboard 200 at number 85, with sales of 6,000 and a 219% increase. In February 2012 after her appearance on the Super Bowl XLVI halftime show, the album again entered the Billboard 200 at number 24 with sales of 16,000 copies, a 1,341% increase from the previous week. In Canada, the album debuted at the top of the Canadian Albums Chart, with sales of 17,000 copies.

In Australia and New Zealand, Celebration debuted at numbers eight and two on the official charts, respectively. It was certified gold in both Australia and New Zealand, by the Australian Recording Industry Association (ARIA) and Recording Industry Association of New Zealand (RIANZ), indicating shipments of 35,000 and 7,500 copies, respectively. The album also debuted at number one on the GfK Chart-Track albums chart in Ireland, earning a platinum certification from the Irish Recorded Music Association (IRMA) for shipments of 15,000 copies of the album. In Japan, Celebration reached a peak of number three on the Oricon albums chart and ranked number 47 on the Oricon year-end rankings, selling 177,194 copies and earning a gold certification.

In the United Kingdom, Celebration debuted at number one, selling 77,000 copies in the first week. It became Madonna's eleventh number-one release on the UK Albums Chart, tying her with Elvis Presley as the solo act with the most number-one albums in British chart history. From 2009 to 2012, the album had three separate chart runs within the top 100 of the albums chart. It re-entered the chart again on March 1, 2015, at number 38 with sales of 2,476 copies, following the release of her single "Living for Love" from her 13th studio album, Rebel Heart. The album was certified double platinum by the British Phonographic Industry (BPI) for shipment of 600,000 copies across the United Kingdom, and it had sold 666,000 copies as of 2019, according to Official Charts Company.

The album reached the top of the charts in Denmark, Flanders, Germany, and Italy, while in Austria, Finland, the Netherlands, Norway, Portugal, Spain, Sweden, Switzerland, and Wallonia the album debuted within the top ten of the official charts. In France, Celebration debuted with 21,484 units and later received a platinum certification from Syndicat National de l'Édition Phonographique (SNEP) for shipments of 100,000 copies. It also debuted at number one on Billboard's European Top 100 Albums chart, topping the chart for four consecutive weeks. Celebration was certified triple platinum by Federazione Industria Musicale Italiana (FIMI) for shipments of 150,000 copies. In total, Celebration sold over a million copies across Europe, earning a platinum certification from the International Federation of the Phonographic Industry (IFPI).

== Singles and charted songs ==
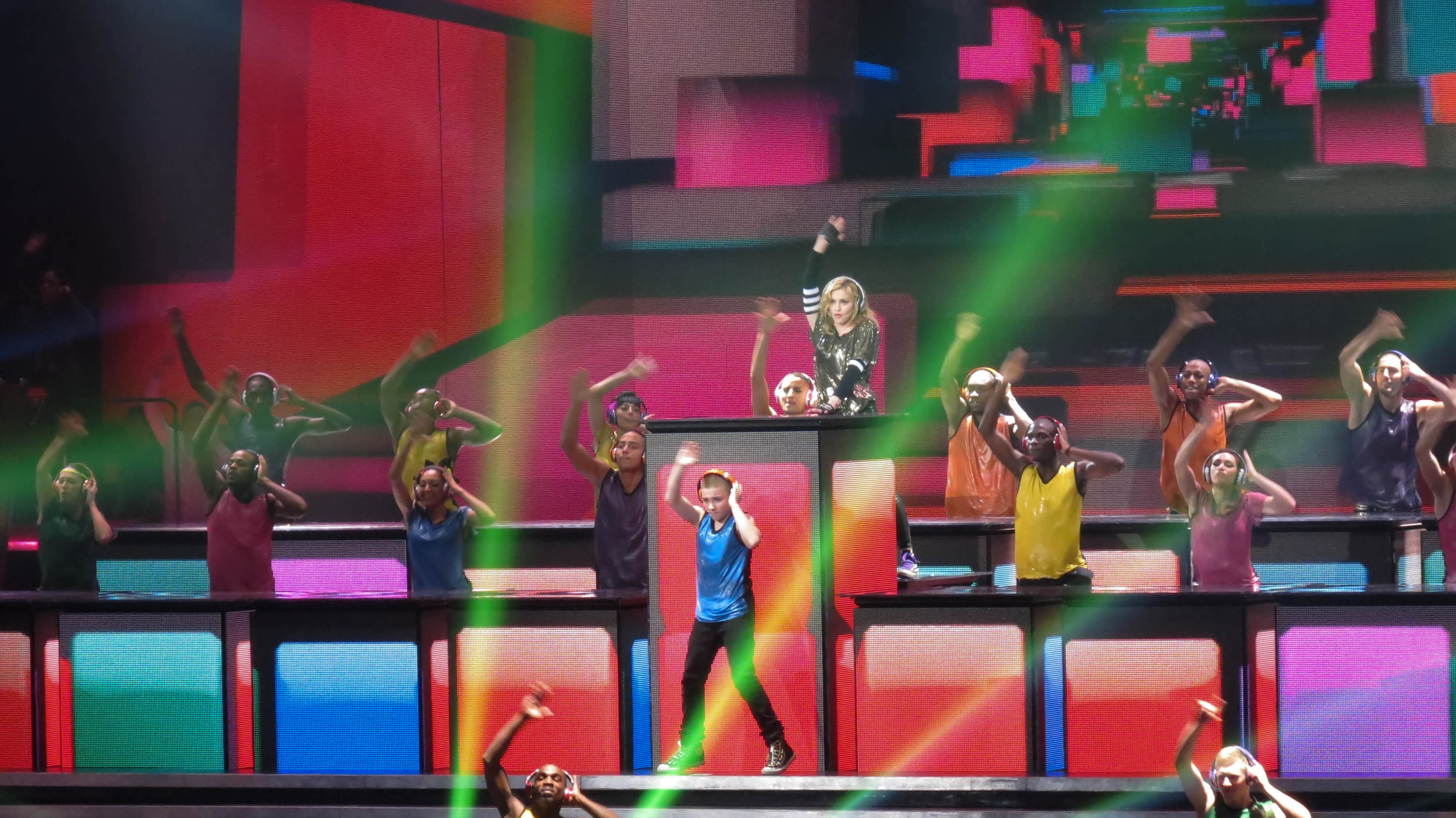
Madonna closed The MDNA Tour with an energetic performance of "Celebration".

"Celebration" was the first single from the compilation. A first preview of the song was added to the performance of "Holiday" during the 2009 leg of the Sticky & Sweet Tour. It was scheduled to be released to radio stations on August 3, 2009. However, the single leaked onto the internet, so the date was changed to July 31, 2009. The digital download was also released that day because of the leak. Remixes of the song were released to dance clubs on July 24, 2009. "Celebration" received mixed reviews from contemporary critics. The song reached the top of the charts in countries like Finland, Italy and Sweden, while reaching the top ten in other European nations. It became Madonna's fifty-fifth entry to the Billboard Hot 100 and her fortieth number-one song on the Billboard Hot Dance Club Songs chart.

On December 11, 2009, Madonna's official website confirmed that "Revolver" would be released as the second and final single from the album in some territories. The digital maxi single was released in many countries on December 29, 2009, followed by a CD maxi single in the US in late January 2010 and a 12" vinyl single in early February 2010. Contemporary critics gave the song mixed reviews. Some praised the chorus line "My love's a revolver" while others felt that it was underwhelming and not on par with Madonna's previous singles. "Revolver" charted in the lower reaches of the official charts of Belgium, Canada, Finland and the United Kingdom while reaching number four on the Billboard Hot Dance Club Songs chart in the United States. This was Madonna's last single of the 2000s.

"It's So Cool" debuted on the official charts of Finland, Italy and Sweden at numbers 8, 20, and 30, respectively, due to digital downloads. "Broken", the fourth song recorded for the album but not used, was written and produced by Madonna and Oakenfold, with additional writing from Ian Green and Ciaran Gribbin. "Broken" was given to official members of Madonna's fan club, Icon as a free 12" vinyl as part of their membership in late 2012.

== Track listing ==
=== Standard edition ===
Celebration track listing
No.	Title	Writer(s)	Original album	Length
1.	"Hung Up"	Madonna; Stuart Price; Björn Ulvaeus; Benny Andersson	Confessions on a Dance Floor (2005)	5:38
2.	"Music"	Madonna; Mirwais Ahmadzaï	Music (2000)	3:45
3.	"Vogue" (The Immaculate Collection version)	Madonna; Shep Pettibone	I'm Breathless (1990)	5:16
4.	"4 Minutes" (radio edit, featuring Justin Timberlake and Timbaland)	Madonna; Timberlake; Timothy Mosley; Nate Hills	Hard Candy (2008)	3:09
5.	"Holiday"	Curtis Hudson; Lisa Stevens	Madonna (1983)	6:08
6.	"Like a Virgin" (The Immaculate Collection version)	Thomas Kelly; William Steinberg	Like a Virgin (1984)	3:11
7.	"Into the Groove"	Madonna; Stephen Bray	Like a Virgin (1985)	4:45
8.	"Like a Prayer"	Madonna; Patrick Leonard	Like a Prayer (1989)	5:42
9.	"Ray of Light" (radio edit)	Madonna; David Atkins; Christine Leach; Clive Skinner; William Orbit	Ray of Light (1998)	4:33
10.	"La Isla Bonita"	Madonna; Leonard; Bruce Gaitsch	True Blue (1986)	4:03
11.	"Frozen" (radio edit)	Madonna; Leonard	Ray of Light (1998)	5:10
12.	"Material Girl"	Peter Brown; Robert Rans	Like a Virgin (1984)	4:03
13.	"Papa Don't Preach"	Brian Elliot; Madonna (add.)	True Blue (1986)	4:29
14.	"Lucky Star" (2009 Q-Sound edit)	Madonna	Madonna (1983)	3:38
15.	"Express Yourself" (2009 remix/edit)	Madonna; Bray	Like a Prayer (1989)	4:00
16.	"Open Your Heart" (The Immaculate Collection version)	Madonna; Gardner Cole; Peter Rafelson	True Blue (1986)	3:51
17.	"Dress You Up" (2009 edit)	Andrea La Russo; Margaret Stanziale	Like a Virgin (1984)	4:02
18.	"Celebration"	Madonna; Paul Oakenfold; Ian Green; Ciaran Gribbin	Previously unreleased	3:34
Total length:				78:47

=== Deluxe edition ===
Disc one
No.	Title	Writer(s)	Original album	Length
1.	"Hung Up"	Madonna; Stuart Price; Björn Ulvaeus; Benny Andersson	Confessions on a Dance Floor (2005)	5:38
2.	"Music"	Madonna; Mirwais Ahmadzaï	Music (2000)	3:45
3.	"Vogue" (The Immaculate Collection version)	Madonna; Shep Pettibone	I'm Breathless (1990)	5:16
4.	"4 Minutes" (radio edit, featuring Justin Timberlake and Timbaland)	Madonna; Timberlake; Timothy Mosley; Nate Hills	Hard Candy (2008)	3:09
5.	"Holiday"	Curtis Hudson; Lisa Stevens	Madonna (1983)	6:08
6.	"Everybody" (2009 edit)	Madonna	Madonna (1983)	4:10
7.	"Like a Virgin" (The Immaculate Collection version)	Thomas Kelly; William Steinberg	Like a Virgin (1984)	3:11
8.	"Into the Groove"	Madonna; Stephen Bray	Like a Virgin (1985)	4:45
9.	"Like a Prayer"	Madonna; Patrick Leonard	Like a Prayer (1989)	5:42
10.	"Ray of Light" (radio edit)	Madonna; David Atkins; Christine Leach; Clive Skinner; William Orbit	Ray of Light (1998)	4:33
11.	"Sorry" (single edit)	Madonna; Price	Confessions on a Dance Floor (2005)	3:58
12.	"Express Yourself" (2009 remix/edit)	Madonna; Bray	Like a Prayer (1989)	4:00
13.	"Open Your Heart" (The Immaculate Collection version)	Madonna; Gardner Cole; Peter Rafelson	True Blue (1986)	3:51
14.	"Borderline" (2009 Q-Sound edit)	Reggie Lucas	Madonna (1983)	3:59
15.	"Secret" (radio edit)	Madonna; Dallas Austin	Bedtime Stories (1994)	4:28
16.	"Erotica" (radio edit)	Madonna; Pettibone; Anthony Shimkin	Erotica (1992)	4:30
17.	"Justify My Love"	Madonna; Ingrid Chavez; Lenny Kravitz	The Immaculate Collection (1990)	4:54
18.	"Revolver" (featuring Lil Wayne)	Madonna; Dwayne Carter; Justin Franks; Carlos Centel Battey; Steven Andre Battey; Brandon Kitchen	Previously unreleased	3:40
Total length:				79:38

Disc two
No.	Title	Writer(s)	Original album	Length
1.	"Dress You Up" (2009 edit)	Andrea La Russo; Margaret Stanziale	Like a Virgin (1984)	4:02
2.	"Material Girl"	Peter Brown; Robert Rans	Like a Virgin (1984)	4:03
3.	"La Isla Bonita"	Madonna; Leonard; Bruce Gaitsch	True Blue (1986)	4:03
4.	"Papa Don't Preach"	Brian Elliot; Madonna (add.)	True Blue (1986)	4:29
5.	"Lucky Star" (2009 Q-Sound edit)	Madonna	Madonna (1983)	3:38
6.	"Burning Up"	Madonna	Madonna (1983)	3:44
7.	"Crazy for You" (The Immaculate Collection version)	John Bettis; Jon Lind	Vision Quest (1985)	3:46
8.	"Who's That Girl"	Madonna; Leonard	Who's That Girl (1987)	4:00
9.	"Frozen"	Madonna; Leonard	Ray of Light (1998)	6:18
10.	"Miles Away" (radio edit)	Madonna; Timberlake; Mosley; Hills	Hard Candy (2008)	3:45
11.	"Take a Bow"	Madonna; Kenneth B. Edmonds	Bedtime Stories (1994)	5:20
12.	"Live to Tell"	Madonna; Leonard	True Blue (1986)	5:51
13.	"Beautiful Stranger"	Madonna; Orbit	Austin Powers: The Spy Who Shagged Me (1999)	4:22
14.	"Hollywood"	Madonna; Ahmadzaï	American Life (2003)	4:23
15.	"Die Another Day"	Madonna; Ahmadzaï	Die Another Day (2002)	4:36
16.	"Don't Tell Me" (radio edit)	Madonna; Ahmadzaï; Joe Henry	Music (2000)	4:11
17.	"Cherish" (2009 edit)	Madonna; Leonard	Like a Prayer (1989)	3:51
18.	"Celebration"	Madonna; Paul Oakenfold; Ian Green; Ciaran Gribbin	Previously unreleased	3:34
Total length:				77:54

Digital bonus tracks
No.	Title	Writer(s)	Length
19.	"Celebration" (Benny Benassi Remix Edit)	Madonna; Oakenfold; Green; Gribbin	3:58
20.	"It's So Cool"	Madonna; Ahmadzaï; Monte Pittman	3:27

== Charts ==
=== Weekly charts ===
Weekly chart performance for Celebration
Chart (2009–2010)	Peak position
Argentine Albums (CAPIF)	2
Australian Albums (ARIA)	6
Austrian Albums (Ö3 Austria)	4
Belgian Albums (Ultratop Flanders)	1
Belgian Albums (Ultratop Wallonia)	2
Canadian Albums (Billboard)	1
Croatian International Albums (HDU)	1
Czech Albums (ČNS IFPI)	1
Danish Albums (Hitlisten)	1
Dutch Albums (Album Top 100)	2
European Top 100 Albums (Billboard)	1
Finnish Albums (Suomen virallinen lista)	2
French Compilation Albums (SNEP)	1
German Albums (Offizielle Top 100)	1
Hungarian Albums (MAHASZ)	2
Irish Albums (IRMA)	1
Italian Albums (FIMI)	1
Japanese Albums (Oricon)	3
Mexican Albums (Top 100 Mexico)	1
New Zealand Albums (RMNZ)	2
Norwegian Albums (VG-lista)	3
Polish Albums (ZPAV)	3
Portuguese Albums (AFP)	2
Russian Albums (2M)	1
Scottish Albums (Official Charts)	1
South African Albums (RSG)	7
Spanish Albums (Promusicae)	2
Swedish Albums (Sverigetopplistan)	2
Swiss Albums (Schweizer Hitparade)	3
UK Albums (Official Charts)	1
US Billboard 200	7

Chart (2011–2016)	Peak position
French Albums (SNEP)	34
US Top Catalog Albums (Billboard)	2

Chart (2025)	Peak position
Greek Albums (IFPI)	55

=== Monthly charts ===
Monthly chart performance for Celebration
Chart (2009)	Peak position
Uruguayan Albums (CUDISCO)	9

Chart (2024)	Peak position
Croatian International Vinyl Albums (HDU)	6

=== Year-end charts ===
2009 year-end chart performance for Celebration
Chart (2009)	Position
Australian Albums (ARIA)	73
Belgian Albums (Ultratop Flanders)	23
Belgian Albums (Ultratop Wallonia)	47
Danish Albums (Hitlisten)	29
Dutch Albums (Album Top 100)	59
European Top 100 Albums (Billboard)	19
Finnish Albums (Suomen virallinen lista)	2
German Albums (Official Top 100)	63
Hungarian Albums (MAHASZ)	29
Italian Albums (FIMI)	21
Japanese Albums (Oricon)	47
Mexican Albums (Top 100 Mexico)	30
Polish Albums (ZPAV)	27
Swedish Albums (Sverigetopplistan)	46
Swiss Albums (Schweizer Hitparade)	61
UK Albums (OCC)	40

2010 year-end chart performance for Celebration
Chart (2010)	Position
Belgian Midprice Albums (Ultratop Flanders)	13
Belgian Midprice Albums (Ultratop Wallonia)	6
European Top 100 Albums (Billboard)	99
Italian Albums (FIMI)	88

2011 year-end chart performance for Celebration
Chart (2011)	Position
Belgian Midprice Albums (Ultratop Flanders)	48
Belgian Midprice Albums (Ultratop Wallonia)	25

2012 year-end chart performance for Celebration
Chart (2012)	Position
Belgian Midprice Albums (Ultratop Wallonia)	24
Italian Albums (FIMI)	92

== Certifications and sales ==
Certifications and sales for Celebration
Region	Certification	Certified units/sales
Argentina (CAPIF)	Gold	20,000^{^}
Australia (ARIA)	Gold	35,000^{^}
Belgium (BRMA)	Platinum	30,000^{*}
Brazil (Pro-Música Brasil)	2× Platinum	120,000^{*}
Costa Rica	Gold	5,000
Denmark (IFPI Danmark)	2× Platinum	40,000^{‡}
Finland (Musiikkituottajat)	Platinum	29,416
France (SNEP)	Platinum	100,000^{*}
GCC (IFPI Middle East)	Platinum	6,000^{*}
Germany (BVMI)	3× Gold	300,000^{‡}
Ireland (IRMA)	Platinum	15,000^{^}
Italy (FIMI)	3× Platinum	150,000^{‡}
Japan (RIAJ)	Platinum	250,000^{^}
Mexico (AMPROFON)	Platinum	60,000^{^}
New Zealand (RMNZ)	Platinum	15,000^{‡}
Poland (ZPAV)	Platinum	20,000^{*}
Portugal (AFP)	Gold	10,000^{^}
Russia (NFPF)	Platinum	20,000^{*}
Spain (Promusicae)	Gold	30,000^{^}
Sweden (GLF)	Platinum	40,000^{^}
Switzerland (IFPI Switzerland)	Platinum	30,000^{^}
Taiwan	—	25,000 (Note: 2009 year-end sales, according to Taiwan Institute of Economic Research.)
United Kingdom (BPI)	2× Platinum	666,000
United States (RIAA)	Gold	500,000^{^}
Summaries
Europe (IFPI)	Platinum	1,000,000^{*}
Worldwide	—	4,000,000
^{*} Sales figures based on certification alone.^{^} Shipments figures based on certification alone.^{‡} Sales+streaming figures based on certification alone.

== Release history ==
Release dates for Celebration
Country	Date	Format	Label	Ref.
Australia	September 18, 2009	1-CD; 2-CD	Warner Bros. Records	
Italy	September 18, 2009	1-CD; 2-CD	Warner Bros. Records	
United Kingdom	September 18, 2009	1-CD; 2-CD	Warner Bros. Records	
Brazil	September 21, 2009	1-CD; 2-CD	Warner Bros. Records	
Finland	September 23, 2009	1-CD; 2-CD	Warner Bros. Records	
United States	September 28, 2009	1-CD; 2-CD	Warner Bros. Records	
Australia	September 18, 2009	DVD	Warner Bros. Records	
Brazil	September 21, 2009	DVD	Warner Bros. Records	
Colombia	September 29, 2009	DVD	Warner Bros. Records	
United States	September 29, 2009	DVD	Warner Bros. Records	
United States	December 22, 2009	LP	Warner Bros. Records	
Various	March 1, 2024	LP	Warner; Rhino	

== See also ==
- List of European number-one hits of 2009
- List of number-one albums of 2009 (Canada)
- List of number-one albums from the 2000s (Denmark)
- List of number-one albums of 2009 (Finland)
- List of number-one hits of 2009 (Germany)
- List of number-one albums of 2009 (Ireland)
- List of number-one hits of 2009 (Italy)
- List of number-one albums of 2009 (Mexico)
- List of Ultratop 50 number-one singles of 2009
- List of UK Albums Chart number ones of the 2000s
