= Ball Arena =

Multi-purpose indoor arena in Denver

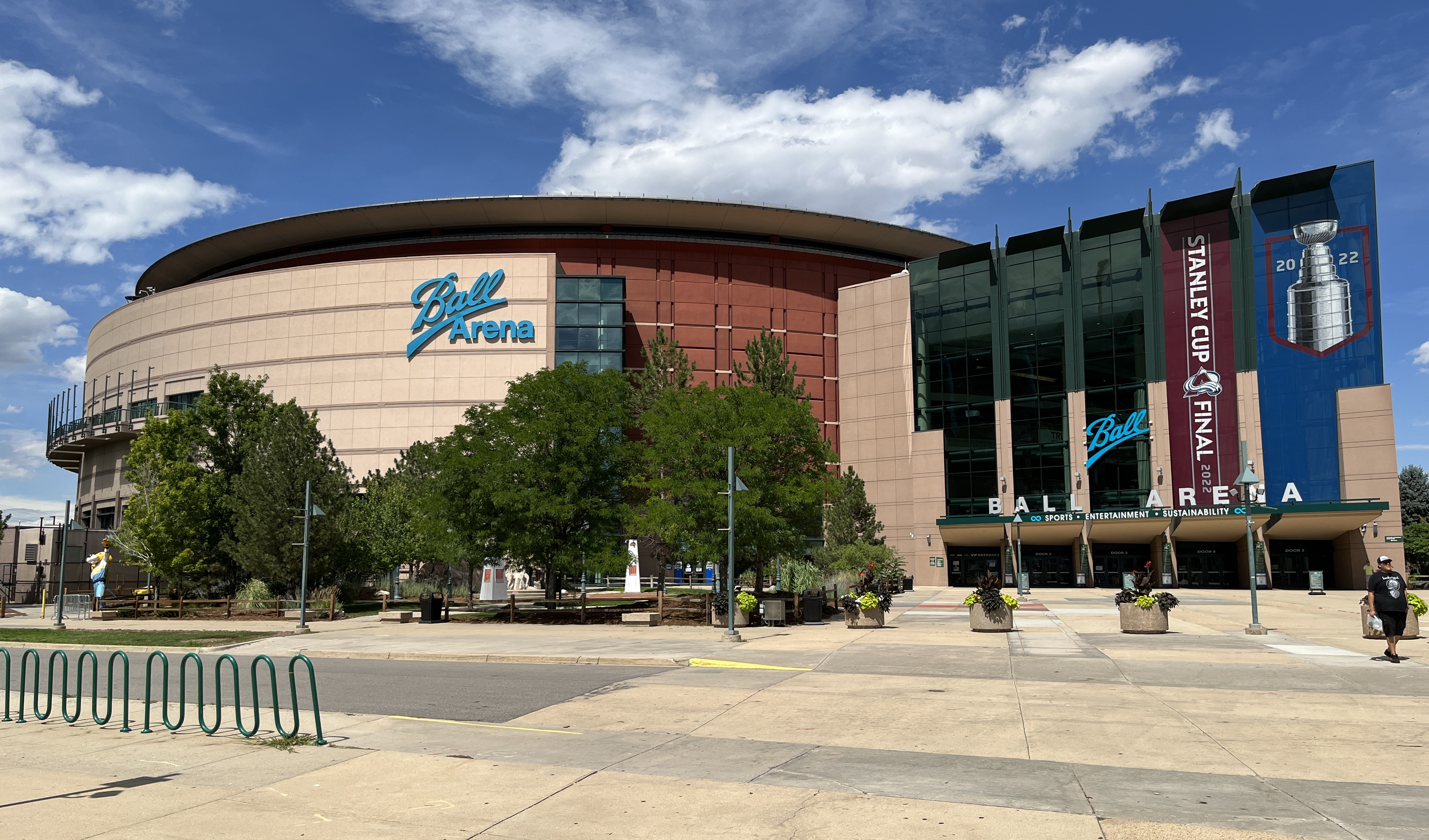
- Ball Arena in August 2022

- Location in Colorado Location in the United States Location in North America
- Interactive map of Ball Arena
- Former names: Pepsi Center (1999–2020)
- Address: 1000 Chopper Circle
- Location: Denver, Colorado, U.S.
- Coordinates: 39°44′55″N 105°0′27″W
- Owner: Kroenke Sports & Entertainment
- Capacity: Basketball: 19,520; Hockey/Lacrosse: 17809; Concerts: 21,000
- Field size: 675,000 sq ft (62,700 m^{2})
- Public transit: RTD: at Ball Arena–Elitch Gardens

Construction
- Groundbreaking: November 20, 1997
- Opened: October 1, 1999; 27 years ago
- Cost: US$187 million (US$375 million in 2025 dollars)
- Architect: HOK Sport
- Project manager: ICON Venue Group
- Structural engineer: Thornton Tomasetti
- Services engineer: M-E Engineers
- General contractor: Mortenson Construction

Tenants
- Colorado Avalanche (NHL) (1999–present); Denver Nuggets (NBA) (1999–present); Colorado Mammoth (NLL) (2003–present); Colorado Crush (AFL) (2003–2008)

Website
- ballarena.com

Ball Arena (formerly Pepsi Center) is a multi-purpose indoor arena located in Denver, Colorado, United States. It is situated at Speer Boulevard, a main thoroughfare in downtown Denver and is served by two nearby exits off Interstate 25. A light rail station is on the western side of the complex. Opened in 1999, it is the home arena of the Denver Nuggets of the National Basketball Association (NBA), the Colorado Avalanche of the National Hockey League (NHL) and the Colorado Mammoth of the National Lacrosse League (NLL).

== History ==
Pepsi Center logo (1999–2009)

The arena replaced McNichols Sports Arena as the home of the Avalanche and Nuggets. Groundbreaking for the arena on the 4.6-acre (19,000 m^{2}) site was held on November 20, 1997, before reaching completion and opening in October 1999. Also included in the complex are a basketball practice facility used by the Nuggets, and the Breckenridge Brewery Mountain House, a restaurant accessible from within and outside the Center itself. The atrium of the building houses a suspended sculpture depicting various hockey and basketball athletes in action poses.

Prior to the 2013–14 season, the octagonal scoreboard that was in use since the arena's opening was replaced with a new four-sided rectangular scoreboard. The two center faces measure 27 by 48 feet (8.2 m × 14.6 m) long, while the two end faces measure 21 by 25 feet (6.4 m × 7.6 m) wide.

From its opening through 2020, the naming rights to the arena were held by PepsiCo, under which it was known as Pepsi Center. On October 22, 2020, the naming rights were sold to Broomfield-based Ball Corporation as part of a global multi-year agreement with Kroenke Sports & Entertainment (KSE), which also makes it the exclusive "sustainability partner" of the arena. As part of the agreement, all KSE-owned sports teams and venues will employ recyclable aluminum products provided by Ball to reduce plastic waste, with Ball Arena to transition to serving concessions in aluminum packaging by 2022.

In May 2022, it was announced that the parking lots around Ball Arena would be redeveloped into a 55-acre (22 ha) mixed-use development as a means to reconnect the arena to Downtown. On October 21, 2024, the project was approved by the Denver City Council as a 64-acre (26 ha) development that will build over 6,000 housing units by 2050. In September 2026, a $135 million renovation was announced that would upgrade the arena by the 2028–29 season which would include an expansion of the East Atrium with a new glass facade, new escalators, a new team shop, a widening of entrances and concourses, point-of-sale and tech upgrades, and three new clubs.

== Events ==
=== Hockey ===
The arena hosted the 2001 NHL All-Star Game, plus two Stanley Cup Final series in 2001 and 2022. The Avalanche won both times, the first at home.

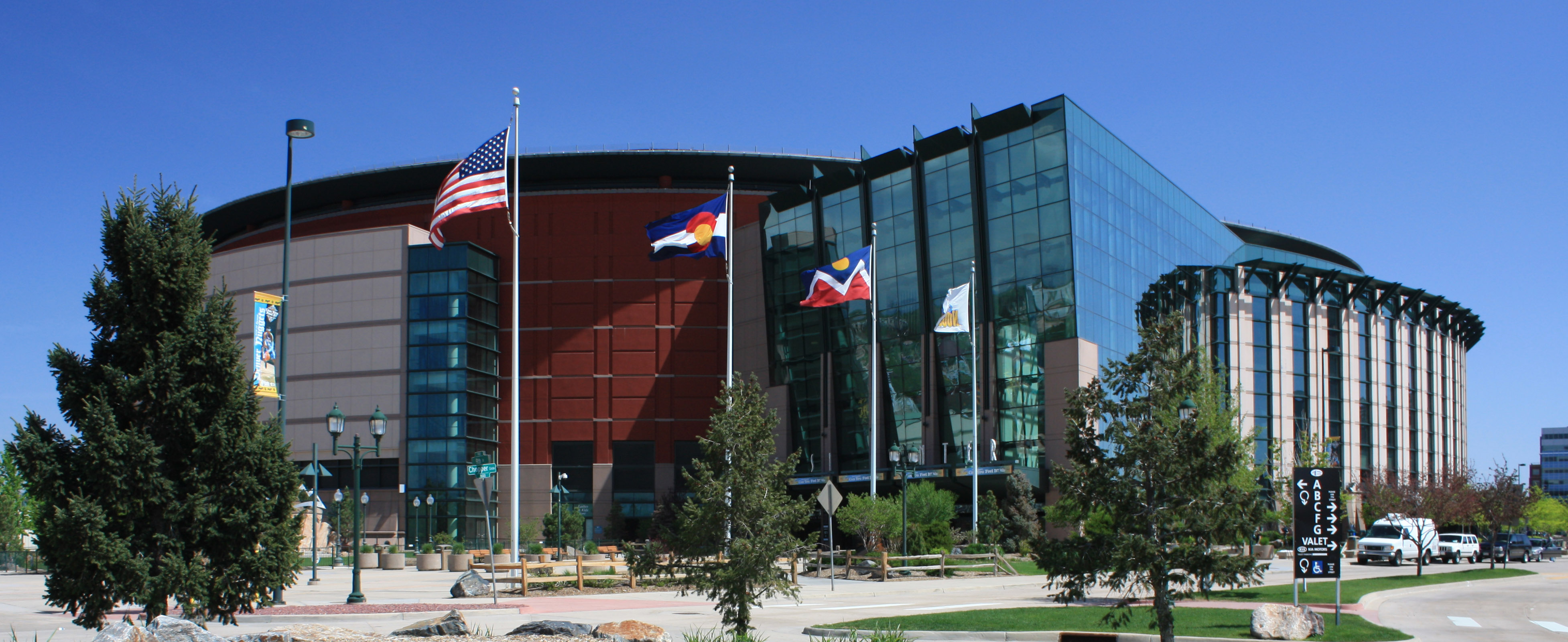
Exterior of Ball Arena in May 2009, then known as the Pepsi Center

In 2007, the west regionals of the NCAA Division I hockey tournament were held at the arena, hosted by the University of Denver. The following year, it hosted the Frozen Four round of the 2008 tournament.

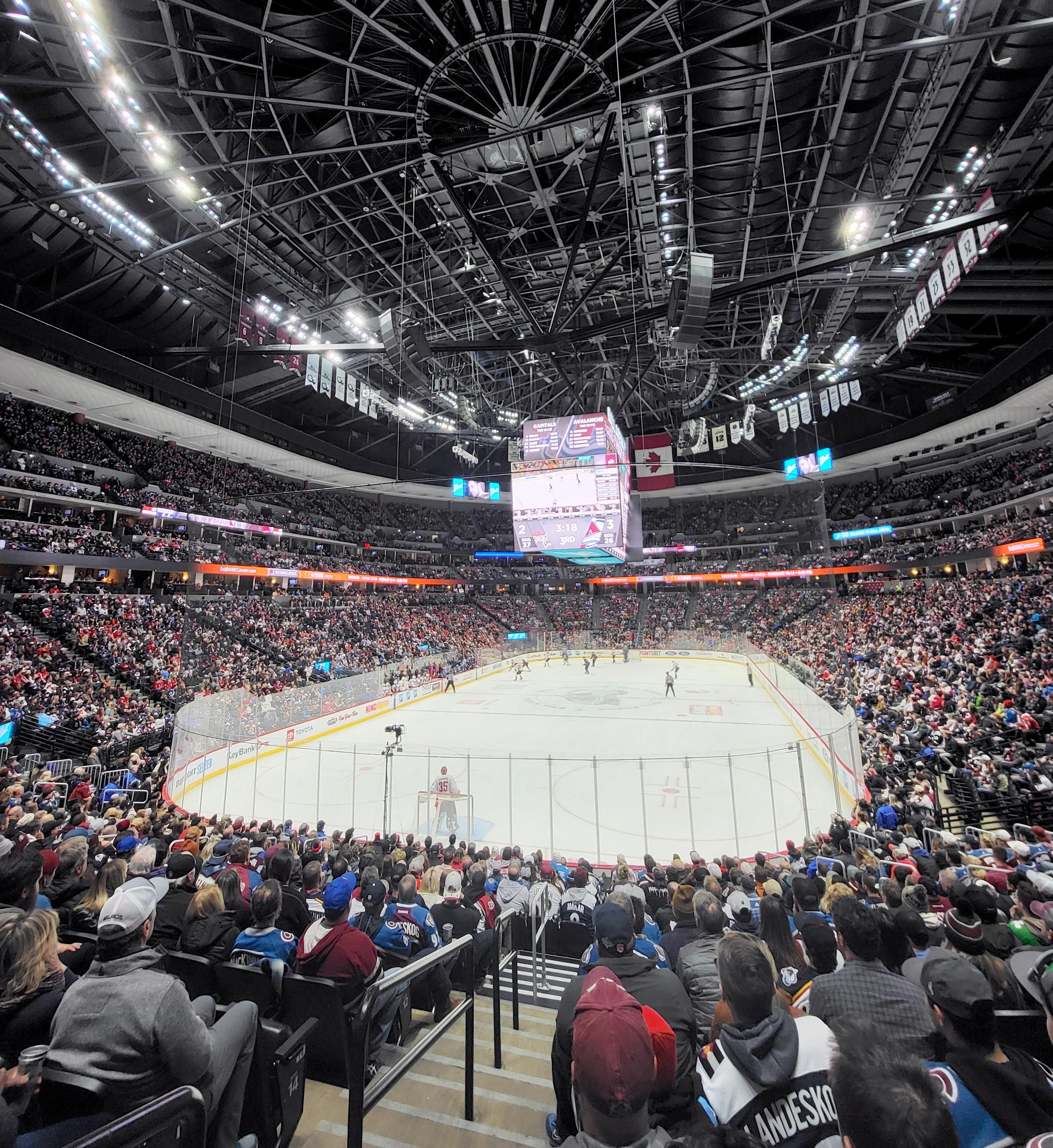
Interior of Ball Arena during a Colorado Avalanche game in January 2023

On January 12, 2025, the first Professional Women's Hockey League (PWHL) game in Denver was played at the arena between the Montreal Victoire and the Minnesota Frost; 14,018 fans attended, setting a new record for attendance of women's hockey in the United States. The PWHL returned on January 25, 2026 for a game between the Vancouver Goldeneyes and Seattle Torrent and March 15, 2026 between the New York Sirens and Minnesota Frost. The PWHL returned on February 7, 2027 for a game between the Vancouver Goldeneyes and Vegas Vanguards and April 9, 2027 for a game between the Minnesota Frost and Seattle Torrent.

=== Basketball/NBA ===
Ball Arena hosted the 2005 NBA All-Star Game, and hosted three games of the 2023 NBA Finals. The Nuggets won the 2023 NBA championship at home in Game 5 on June 12 of that year, the first title in franchise history, ending a 47–year drought. The arena has hosted games of the NCAA Division I men's basketball tournament in 2004, 2008, 2011, 2016, and 2023. In 2012, the NCAA Women's Final Four was played at the arena, hosted by the Mountain West Conference.

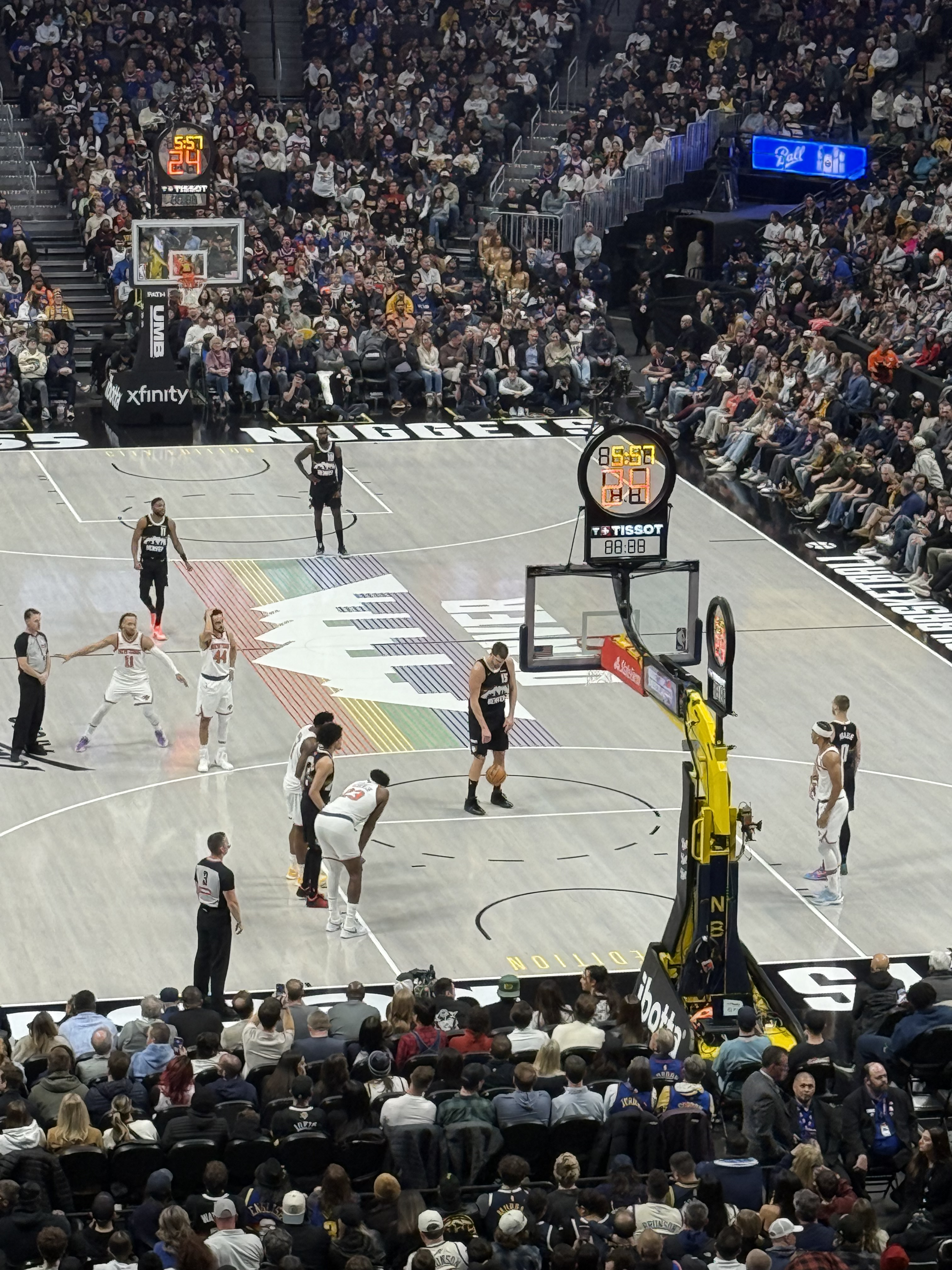
Interior of Ball Arena during a game between the Denver Nuggets and eventual NBA champion New York Knicks in March 2026, Nikola Jokić prepares to shoot a free throw

From 2004 to 2006, the arena hosted the Mountain West's men's conference tournament.

=== Mixed martial arts ===
UFC held its first event at the arena, UFC 135: Jones vs. Rampage, on September 24, 2011. It also hosted UFC 150: Henderson vs. Edgar II the following August. The UFC returned to the arena in 2017 for UFC on Fox: Shevchenko vs. Peña. The promotion returned to the arena the following year in November for UFC Fight Night: The Korean Zombie vs. Rodríguez. The arena most recently held UFC on ESPN: Namajunas vs. Cortez and ONE Championship's ONE 168 in July & September 2024 respectively.

Interior of Ball Arena prior to a game between the Denver Nuggets and Golden State Warriors in October 2026

=== Professional wrestling ===
The arena has hosted various WWE (and in the past, WCW) television broadcasts.

==== The "Denver Debacle" ====
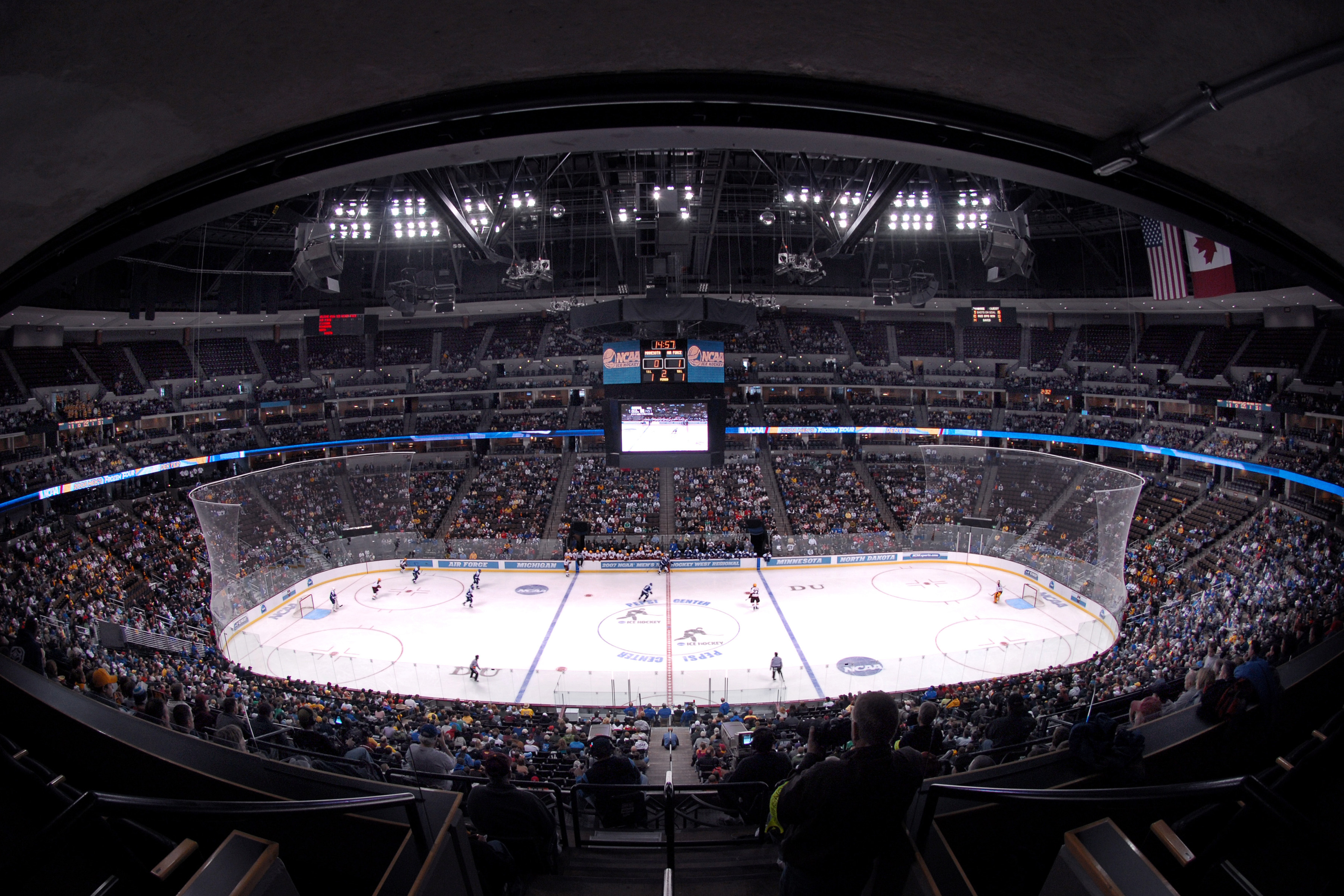
The then-named Pepsi Center's interior during the 2008 Frozen Four hockey tournament, with the scoreboard used from 1999 to 2013.

On May 18, 2009, WWE cancelled and moved three events it had scheduled in Colorado, including a WWE Raw taping on May 25, 2009, at Pepsi Center, after the Denver Nuggets were scheduled to play Game 4 of the NBA Western Conference finals against the Los Angeles Lakers on the same date. The affected events were all moved to the Lakers' home arena of Staples Center, while WWE rescheduled an August 7 taping of Raw for Pepsi Center.

In an appearance on KUSA, WWE co-founder and CEO Vince McMahon accused the "inept management" of team and arena owner Stan Kroenke as having led to the conflict. A KSE spokesperson stated that "despite the propaganda campaign launched by WWE and Chairman Vince McMahon, the KSE team maintained a professional manner throughout this process. We had hoped for, and worked hard toward an amicable resolution - which we verbally had on Tuesday."

The conflict would be referenced during the ensuing May 25 Raw, which opened with a skit between impersonators of Kroenke and Lakers owner Jerry Buss. "Kroenke" boasted about the Nuggets and his indifference to WWE and its fans. Mr. McMahon subsequently entered the ring, jokingly proposed the formation of his own basketball league, the XBA (a reference to his ill-fated XFL), and shoved "Kroenke" down — threatening that people who "push" WWE's fans would get "pushed back". The episode's main event would feature an NBA-themed 5-on-5 tag team match, where a face team wearing Lakers jerseys (John Cena, Batista, Jerry Lawler, MVP, and Mr. Kennedy) defeated a heel team wearing Nuggets jerseys (Randy Orton, The Miz, Cody Rhodes, Ted DiBiase, and Big Show).

=== Other events ===
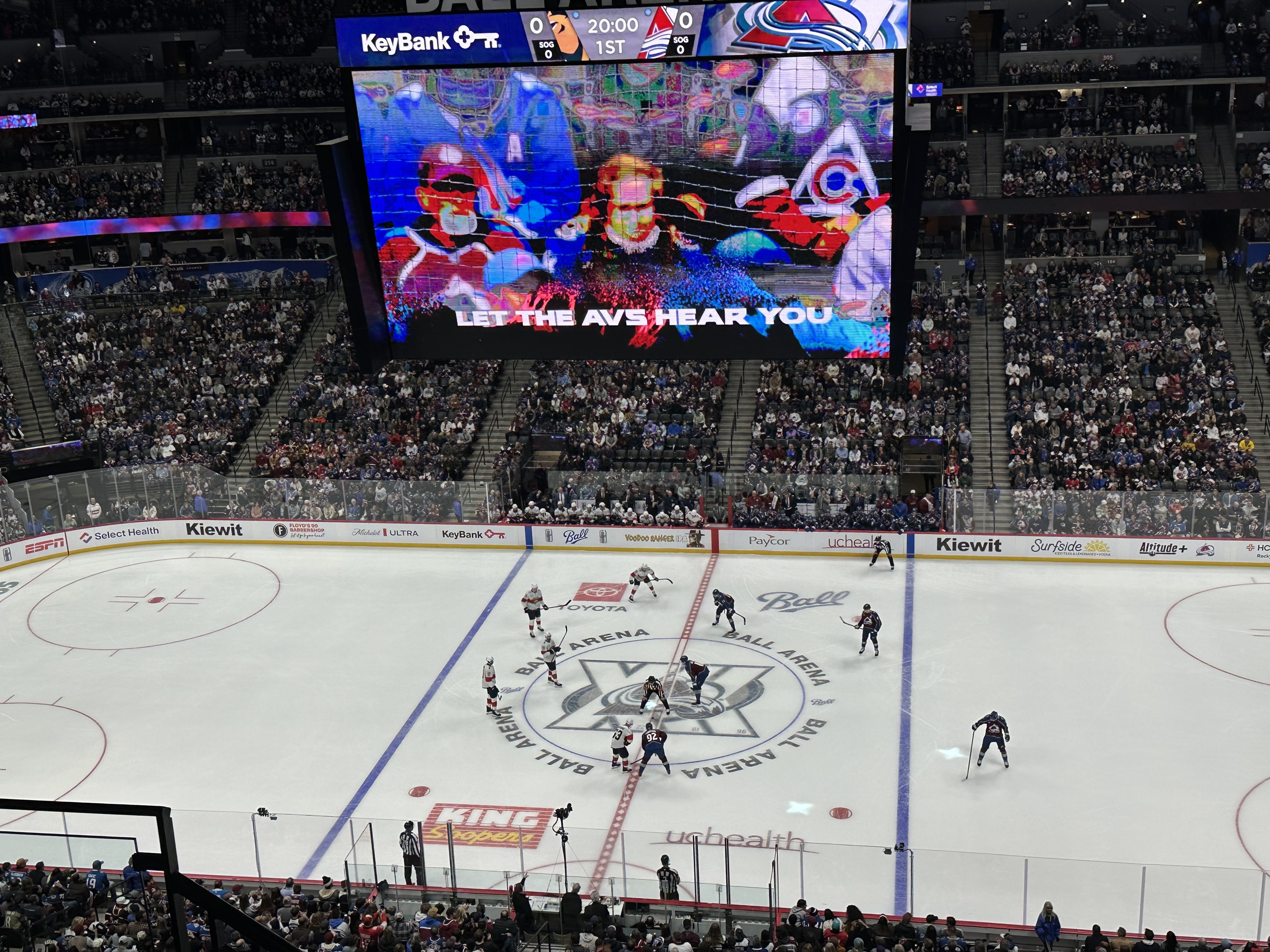
Ball Arena during a game between the Colorado Avalanche and Florida Panthers in December 2025.

Ball Arena has hosted a wide array of music concerts and other events since opening in 1999. Celine Dion performed a sold-out show at the venue - the first event of any kind at the location, on October 1, 1999. Dion dedicated the show to the Columbine community following the school shooting that occurred less than six months prior. Since then, artists such as Beyoncé, Destiny's Child, Paul McCartney, Garth Brooks, Lady Gaga, Katy Perry, Coldplay, Demi Lovato, Nick Jonas, Christina Aguilera, Britney Spears, Taylor Swift, Imagine Dragons, Pink, NSYNC, Shania Twain, Cher, Kiss, Justin Timberlake, Elton John, Twenty One Pilots, and Madonna have held concerts at the arena.

During the week of July 2–8, 2007, the arena hosted the International Convention and Contests of the Barbershop Harmony Society, a men's singing organization.

After a short-lived race at the Denver Civic Center in the early 1990s, the Champ Car World Series ran an annual street circuit race around Pepsi Center, the Grand Prix of Denver. The race was discontinued after the 2006 event.

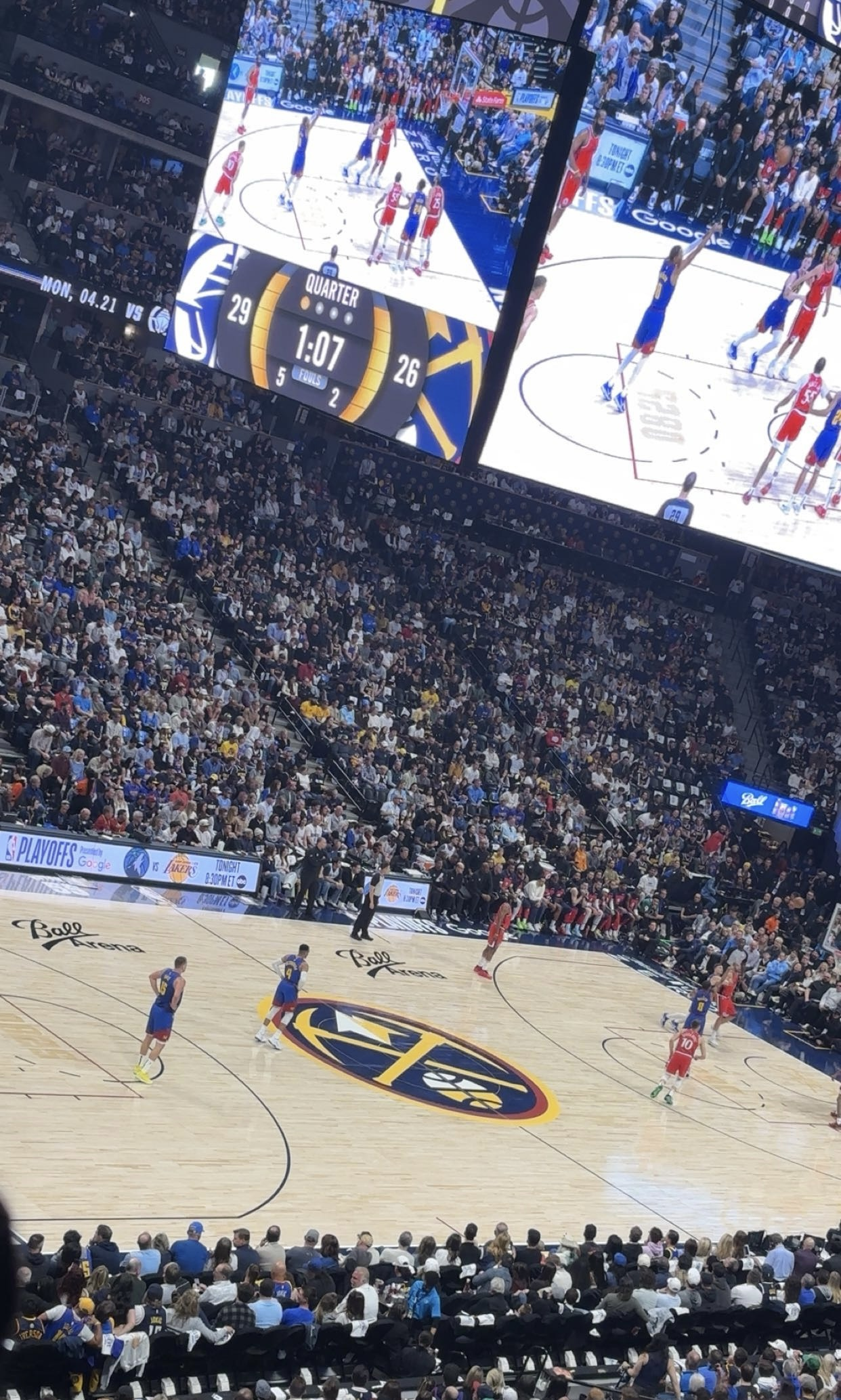
Interior of Ball Arena during a playoff game between the Denver Nuggets and Los Angeles Clippers in April 2025

The majority of the 2008 Democratic National Convention was held at the arena, culminating with the official nomination of then-Senator Barack Obama as the Democratic Party's candidate for the 2008 presidential election. However, the closing night of the convention, including Obama's acceptance speech, was instead held at Invesco Field at Mile High.

Madonna's concert on October 18, 2012, as part of her MDNA Tour (2012) drew controversy and complaints from critics and fans alike. Not only was the show reported to have started three hours late, but it also used fake guns during a violence-inspired performance of her tracks "Revolver" and "Gang Bang". The performance took place less than three months after a mass shooting at a movie theatre in nearby Aurora, Colorado, driving feelings that its inclusion was insensitive and in poor taste.

Garth Brooks set a ticket sales record in 2015 on his World Tour, selling 140,000 tickets for nine shows at the venue scheduled across six days.

In January 2025, bluegrass musician Billy Strings played three consecutive sold-out nights at the arena. Strings' performances at the venue were the highest attended shows of his career.

== See also ==
- List of indoor arenas by capacity

Events and tenants
| Preceded by McNichols Sports Arena | Home of the Denver Nuggets; 1999–present | Succeeded by Current |
| Preceded by McNichols Sports Arena | Home of the Colorado Avalanche; 1999–present | Succeeded by Current |
| Preceded by Air Canada Centre | Host of the NHL All-Star Game; 2001 | Succeeded by Staples Center |
| Preceded by First arena | Home of the Colorado Mammoth; 2003–present | Succeeded by Current |
| Preceded by First arena | Home of the Colorado Crush; 2003–2008 | Succeeded by Last arena |
| Preceded by Staples Center | Host of the NBA All-Star Game; 2005 | Succeeded by Toyota Center |
| Preceded by Scottrade Center; St. Louis, Missouri | Host of the Frozen Four; 2008 | Succeeded by Verizon Center; Washington, D.C. |
| Preceded by Conseco Fieldhouse | NCAA Division I women's basketball tournament finals venue 2012 | Succeeded by New Orleans Arena |
