= Rio Sex Comedy =

- Promotional poster
- Directed by: Jonathan Nossiter
- Written by: Jonathan Nossiter
- Produced by: Matias Mariani; Flávio R. Tambellini; Philippe Carcassonne; Santiago Amigorena; Jonathan Nossiter
- Starring: Charlotte Rampling; Bill Pullman; Irène Jacob
- Cinematography: Lubomir Bakchev
- Edited by: Sophie Brunet; Jonathan Nossiter
- Release date: 16 September 2010 (TIFF)
- Running time: 124 minutes
- Country: France
- Languages: English, French
- Budget: €5 million

Rio Sex Comedy is a 2010 comedy film, written and directed by Jonathan Nossiter and starring Charlotte Rampling, and Bill Pullman, and Irène Jacob. It premiered at the 2010 Toronto International Film Festival on 16 September.

== Plot ==
Rio de Janeiro is the destination of choice for the misadventures of several expatriates, seeking both personal pleasure and social justice. The eccentric grouping includes a plastic surgeon, an unconventional new U.S. ambassador to Brazil and a filmmaking French couple.

== Cast ==
- Charlotte Rampling as Charlotte
- Bill Pullman as William
- Irène Jacob as Irène
- Fisher Stevens as Fish
- Daniela Dams as Iracema
- Jérôme Kircher as Robert
- Jean-Marc Roulot as Antoine
- Bob Nadkarni as Bob
- Jesus Luz as Man on tour bus (uncredited cameo)
