= Celebration (Madonna song) =

2009 single by Madonna

Single by Madonna

from the album Celebration
- Released: July 30, 2009
- Genre: Dance-pop
- Length: 3:35
- Label: Warner Bros.
- Songwriters: Madonna; Paul Oakenfold; Ian Green; Ciaran Gribbin
- Producers: Madonna; Paul Oakenfold

Madonna singles chronology
| "Miles Away" (2008) | "Celebration" (2009) | "Revolver" (2009) |

Music videos
- "Celebration" on YouTube; "Celebration" (Fan Version) on YouTube

"Celebration" is a song recorded by American singer Madonna for her third greatest hits album of the same name (2009). Written by Madonna, Paul Oakenfold, Ian Green, and Ciaran Gribbin, it was produced by Madonna and Oakenfold. Musically a dance-pop track with elements of electronic dance music (EDM), it recalls the singer's work from the 1980s and 1990s, while its lyrics invite listeners to join a party. The song was released on July 30, 2009, as the album's lead single, with official remixes by Oakenfold, Benny Benassi, Johnny Vicious, and Akon.

Upon release, "Celebration" received mixed reviews from music critics: some praised its club-ready energy and resemblance to Madonna's earlier hits, while others dismissed it as forgettable, generic, and lyrically weak. The track was nominated for Best Dance Recording at the 52nd Annual Grammy Awards. Commercially, it achieved modest results in the United States, peaking at number 71 on the Billboard Hot 100 and becoming her 55th entry on the chart. The track found greater success internationally, topping the charts in countries including Italy, Finland, and Scotland, and reaching the top three in the United Kingdom.

The accompanying music video was directed by Jonas Åkerlund and features Madonna dancing, posing provocatively, and appearing alongside her daughter Lourdes Leon and then-boyfriend, model Jesus Luz. An alternate video incorporating fan footage was also released. Madonna has included the song in the set lists of her MDNA (2012) and Celebration (2023–2024) concert tours.

== Background and development ==
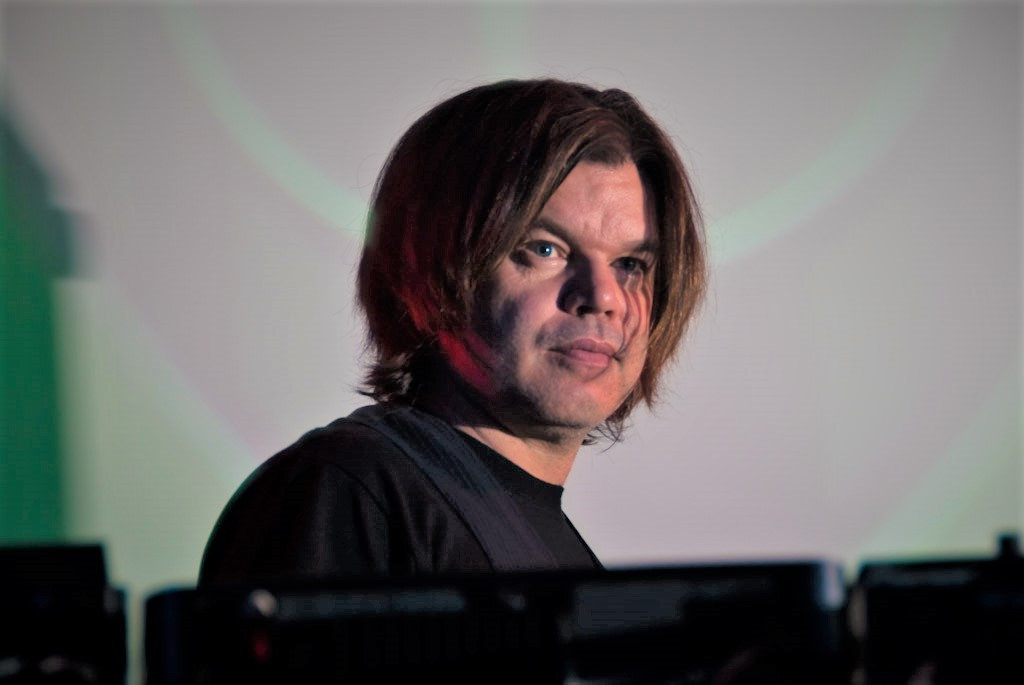
Paul Oakenfold (pictured in 2009) co-wrote and co-produced "Celebration".

In March 2009, Madonna's publicist Liz Rosenberg confirmed that the singer would release a new greatest hits compilation, spanning the first, second, and third decades of her musical career, in September of that year. Two months later, Contactmusic.com reported that English producer and DJ Paul Oakenfold would collaborate with her on three new songs for the project. In an interview with Attitude magazine published in May, Oakenfold revealed three titles —"Broken", "I'm Sorry", and "Celebrate"— describing them as "lyrically classic Madonna with an edgy modern sound". "Celebrate", later retitled "Celebration", was written by Madonna, Oakenfold, Ian Green, and Ciaran Gribbin, with production handled by Madonna and Oakenfold.

The collaboration began while Madonna was on the Sticky & Sweet Tour (2008―2009). She asked Oakenfold what he was working on and requested material that she could write lyrics to. At the time, Oakenfold, Green, and Gribbin had been developing tracks for Oakenfold's upcoming album. They sent Madonna fifteen demos; according to Gribbin, "of these, she chose two I was working on, 'Celebration' and 'Broken'". The trio had already devised the chord progression and arranged the backing track with guitars, keyboards, and drums, while Madonna supplied the lyrics and melody. To accompany the release, official remixes were commissioned from Oakenfold, Benny Benassi, Johnny Vicious, and Akon.

== Composition and release ==
"Celebration"
A 20-second audio sample of "Celebration", which features a highly energetic synth-pop groove.

Musically, "Celebration" has been noted a dance-pop track with elements of electronic dance music (EDM), incorporating house and four-on-the-floor beats. (Note: Attributed to Los Angeles Times, MTV, and Slant Magazine.) Author Daryl Easlea described it as an "upbeat Euro-pop house track clearly aimed at the dance floors of Ibiza and beyond". Other critics, however, felt that compared to Madonna's mid-2000s singles such as "Hung Up" (2005), it was "slightly less Euro" in style, instead recalling the singer's earlier work with John "Jellybean" Benitez, and tracks like "Into the Groove" (1985), "Vogue" (1990), "Deeper and Deeper" (1992), and "Ray of Light" (1998). (Note: Attributed to Los Angeles Times, Billboard, The Oklahoman, and Yahoo Voices.) Chris Williams (Billboard) and Nick Levine (Digital Spy) noted similarities to "4 Minutes" (2008) in its "sense of urgency", and to Calvin Harris's "I'm Not Alone" (2009).

An "unashamed party tune", "Celebration" finds Madonna inviting listeners to join "the dance of life". She sings the lines, "Come join the party / 'cause everybody wants to party with you". James Montgomery of MTV described the refrain as resembling "a truckload of Nintendo Entertainment Systems exploding in unison (only sexier)". Other lines, such as "If it makes you feel good then I say do it / I don’t know what you’re waiting for", are delivered with what Slant Magazine's Paul Schrodt called "garish digital effects". During the bridge, Madonna jokingly remarks that she does not recognize her dance partner without clothes on.

On July 29, 2009, "Celebration" leaked online through multiple file-sharing sites. It was officially made available for streaming and digital download in the following days, and serviced to radio stations on August 3. A digital extended play (EP) of remixes was released on August 19, while physical formats followed in September and October. (Note: See "Release history") To promote the single, Madonna's official website held a "My own Celebration cover" contest in which fans were invited to design their own artwork; ten winners received copies of the promotional CD as prizes. The Akon remix was issued digitally on November 17, and sent to radios on January 26, 2010. The Benny Benassi remix was later included on Finally Enough Love: 50 Number Ones (2022), Madonna's third remix album.

== Critical reception and recognition ==
"Celebration" received mixed reviews from music critics. Todd Martens of the Los Angeles Times called it an "effective reboot" of Madonna's late-1980s hits, though he felt it also sounded "a bit obligatory". Chris A. Sosa of Yahoo Voices agreed, describing it as "good fun" that favorably contrasted with the "icy faux hip-hop" of Hard Candy (2008), but admitted it "doesn't bring anything new to the equation". Joey Guerra of the Houston Chronicle shared this view, noting that the track "doesn't break any new ground but finds Madonna where she's most comfortable — on the dance floor". The Oklahoman's George Lang described "Celebration" as a slight update of Madonna's early dance-pop style, not on par with The Immaculate Collection (1990) but "generally worth celebrating". For Fraser McAlpine of BBC, the song was a "decent dance track", while Stephen M. Deusner of Pitchfork considered it lightweight but effective pop where "what's important isn't Madonna's singing, but the fact that it's Madonna singing". Mayer Nissim of Pink News opined that "for all its disposability, ['Celebration'] just can't be resisted", and Parade's Samuel R. Murrian praised the Benny Benassi remix as the superior version.

Other reviewers were more critical. Michael Slezak of Entertainment Weekly acknowledged its club appeal but felt Madonna was revisiting the "Party! Get on the floor!" theme for "the umpteenth time without even the slightest bit of linguistic flair". Chris Williams of Billboard found the single unoriginal and unlikely to spark new trends, while Sarah Crompton of The Daily Telegraph called it forgettable. Nick Levine called it "relatively unadventurous", while Jude Rogers of The Guardian said it showed "shadows of [Madonna's] old selves, but more light is required". Also from The Guardian, Louis Pattison was more negative, branding the single an "Eurodance monstrosity" and dismissing Oakenfold's production as "grim". Paul Schrodt of Slant Magazine called it a generic "embarrassing failure" and argued that Madonna sounded detached, "like a Real Housewife too sauced on rosé to actually care one way or another".

Some writers compared "Celebration" and "Revolver" —another track recorded for the compilation— unfavorably to the original additions made to The Immaculate Collection, "Justify My Love" and "Rescue Me". Douglas Wolk of Pitchfork argued that while those songs had "pointed [Madonna's] way forward for the next decade", "Celebration" and "Revolver" "just sound like throwaways". Eric Henderson of Slant Magazine described them as "zero-traction" dance tracks unworthy to "kiss the feet [of 'Justify My Love' and 'Rescue Me']".

Despite divided opinions, "Celebration" earned industry recognition. It was nominated for Best Dance Recording at the 52nd Annual Grammy Awards, but lost to Lady Gaga's "Poker Face" (2008). It was also up for Best Pop Dance Track at the 32nd International Dance Music Awards, where the honor went to "When Love Takes Over" (2009) by David Guetta and Kelly Rowland. In retrospective rankings, TheBacklot.com placed it 65th among Madonna's greatest songs, USA Today ranked it 61st, Parade 59th, and Pink News 24th. The staff of Popjustice listed "Celebration" among the best singles of 2009, and Shape magazine included it in their "Top 10 Madonna songs for the gym".

== Commercial performance ==
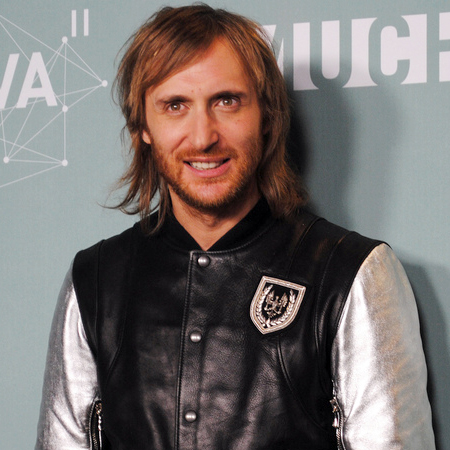
"Sexy Chick" by David Guetta (pictured in 2011) prevented "Celebration" from topping the European Hot 100 Singles chart.

In the United States, "Celebration" debuted and peaked at number 71 on the Billboard Hot 100 for the week of August 22, 2009, becoming Madonna's 55th entry on the chart. It entered the Hot Dance Club Songs and Hot Dance Airplay charts at numbers 29 and seven, respectively, extending her record for the most hits on the latter. On the issue dated September 26, 2009, it became her 40th number-one on the Hot Dance Club Songs chart, more than any other artist. By the end of 2009, "Celebration" ranked 17th on the Hot Dance Club Play year-end chart. The single also peaked at number 33 on the Adult Pop Airplay chart, giving Madonna the most entries in its history. Additionally, it reached number 35 on the Hot Latin Songs chart, becoming one of only four Madonna tracks to appear there, alongside "You'll See" (1995), "American Life" (2003), and "Medellín" (2019). In April 2010, Billboard reported sales of 192,000 digital units, making "Celebration" one of her best-selling singles since 2005. In Canada, "Celebration" debuted at number 56 on the Canadian Hot 100 before reaching number five the following week.

The single performed more strongly across Europe. In the UK Singles Chart, it debuted and peaked at number three on September 20, 2009, and spent seven weeks on the chart. It marked Madonna's 63rd UK top-ten single and remained her last until 2023, when she returned with The Weeknd and Playboi Carti on "Popular". Elsewhere, "Celebration" reached number one in Scotland, Italy, Bulgaria, Sweden, and Finland, where it spent six non-consecutive weeks at the top. In Italy, it was certified platinum by the Federation of the Italian Music Industry (FIMI) for shipments of 60,000 copies, while in Finland it earned a gold certification from the International Federation of the Phonographic Industry (IFPI). The song also reached the top five in France and Germany, the top ten in Ireland and Austria, and narrowly made the top 20 in Spain. On the European Hot 100 Singles chart, it peaked at number two behind David Guetta's "Sexy Chick" (2009). Outside Europe, the single reached number 40 in Australia and number five in Japan.

== Music video ==
=== Background ===
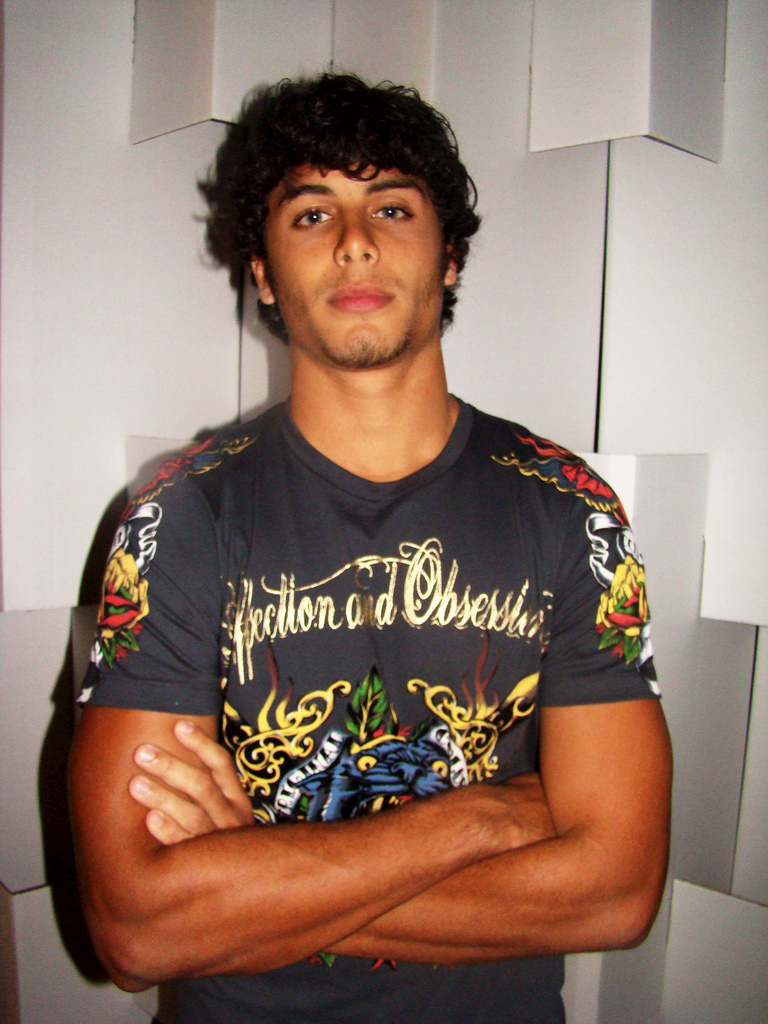
Model Jesus Luz (pictured in 2009), Madonna's then-boyfriend, appears as a DJ in the "Celebration" music video.

The music video for "Celebration" was filmed between dates of the Sticky & Sweet Tour under the direction of Jonas Åkerlund, a frequent Madonna collaborator. Portions were shot at the Dolce & Gabbana Metropole theater in Milan. Fans were invited to participate, with ads on her website encouraging them to attend the Milan and Barcelona shoots "dressed to impress [...] ready to perform, dance or just be yoursel[ves]". Fashion stylists working for Madonna reviewed photos submitted by prospective participants, judging their outfits, looks, and Madonna memorabilia. Of the thirty people selected, five were discarted after an initial screening, while the remaining twenty-five showcased their dancing in group and solo performances before a white backdrop. Dancers from the Sticky & Sweet Tour participated in the filming.

The clip features cameos by her daughter Lourdes Leon and her then-boyfriend Jesus Luz, who appears as a DJ. Madonna wears a Pierre Balmain black mini-dress "gynecologically cut" and encrusted with crystals, paired with knee-high Christian Louboutin boots. Rolling Stone's Daniel Krepps summarized the result as "pretty much what's advertised in the title: a 'celebration' of Madonna's career". The video uses the Benny Benassi remix instead of the album version and opens with Madonna asking, "Haven't I seen you somewhere before?" It shows her dancing and posing provocatively with a group of male dancers, including moments of "groping and grinding guiltlessly" with Luz. In one sequence she removes his jacket, brushes her lips against his, and then pushes him away.

=== Release and reception ===
"Celebration" premiered simultaneously on music channels worldwide and on the American iTunes Store on September 1, 2009. Early teasers featured Oakenfold performing "wacky dance moves", though these shots were not included in the final cut. The video was later included on Madonna's compilation Celebration: The Video Collection (2009). Daniel Krepps wrote that it showed the singer's "dance moves [were] still razor-sharp as she turn[ed] 51". Melinda Newman of HitFix similarly commended Madonna's "energetic and sharp" choreography, noting her physical precision and control.

James Montgomery felt it evoked her "dark era, a period that runs roughly from the release of The Immaculate Collection, to her disastrous appearance on Late Night With David Letterman in 1994. Olivia Smith of the New York Daily News observed that although Madonna had toned down her appearance, she remained "her pelvis-swirling overtly sexual self", while also noting that her interactions with Luz were less provocative than her solo scenes, such as when she grabbed her crotch "in a demonstration after Michael Jackson's heart" or performed on all fours. Newman also highlighted the video's "sparse yet compelling" visual style and praised Åkerlund's "jerky, quick-cut" editing reminiscent of his work on the video for "Ray of Light". She compared Madonna's look to "something straight out of an Andy Warhol party" and noted that despite the song's repeated invitation to “join the party”, the singer "never quite makes it to her own celebration", symbolically excluded from the youthful crowd of dancers.

A second version of the video, featuring fan-submitted footage and clips of Leon wearing her mother's bridal outfit from 1984's Like a Virgin, premiered on Madonna's official MySpace page on September 17, 2009. Barbara Ellen of The Guardian criticized the concept as "deliciously creepy", arguing that dressing her daughter as a younger version of herself exemplified Madonna's tendency to blur the line between her personal life and public image.

== Live performances ==
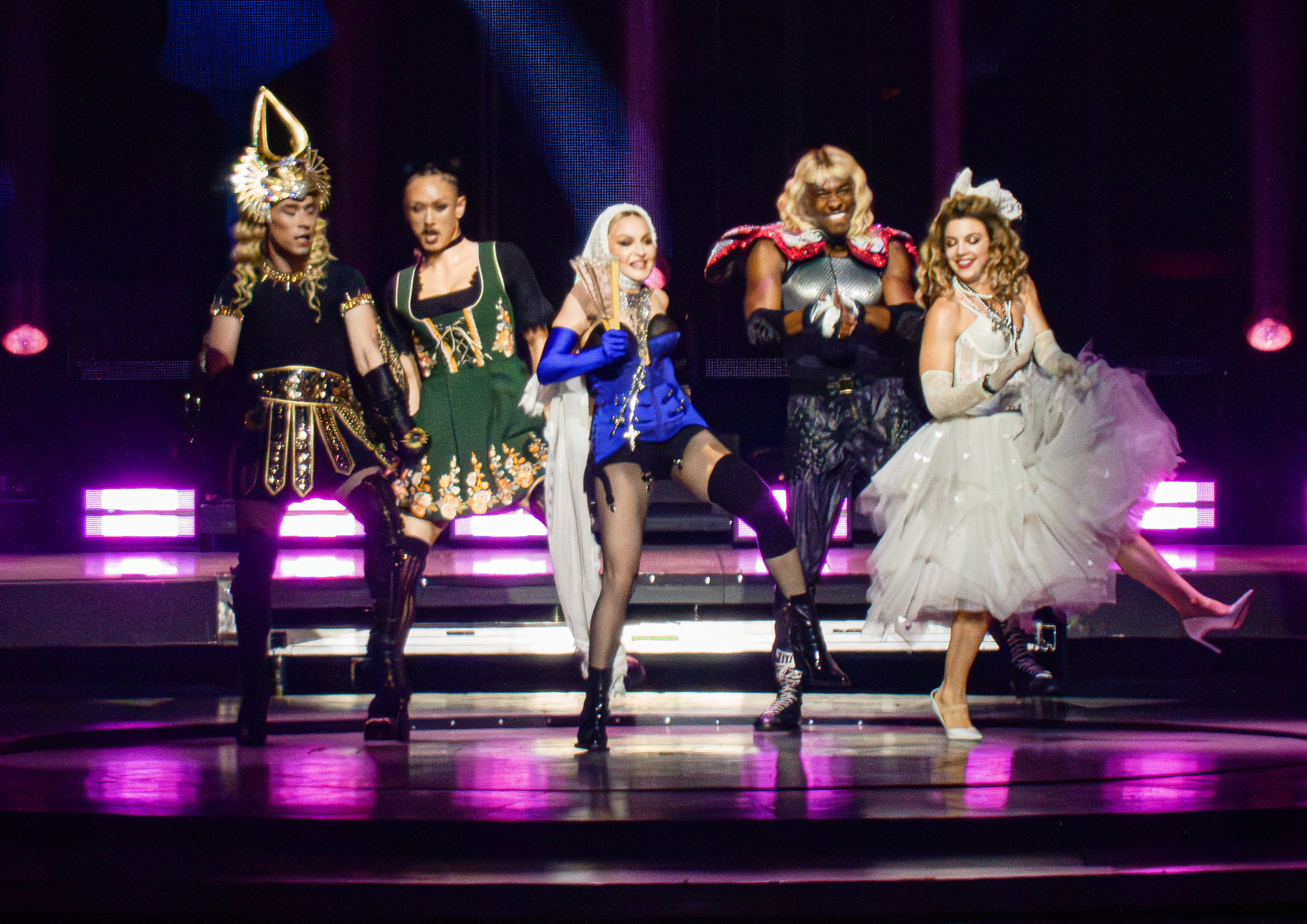
The Celebration Tour's medley performance of "Bitch I'm Madonna" (2015) and "Celebration".

Elements of "Celebration" were incorporated into the performance of "Holiday" (1983) during the Sticky & Sweet Tour in 2009. Three years later, the song served as the closing number of the MDNA Tour (2012). The performance opened with church bells before Madonna and her dancers appeared on stage amid "lights, lasers and colors", according to Argentina's Canal 26. Xavi Sánchez Pons of Mondo Sonoro described the staging as transforming the venue into an "overwhelming nightclub" with platforms and "disco-style Tron-inspired" projections, during which the singer simulated being a DJ. A performance from this tour was included on the MDNA World Tour live album (2013).

In June 2022, Madonna performed the track at Pride's Women of the World Party at New York's Terminal 5 to promote Finally Enough Love: 50 Number Ones. She wore a yellow and pink Adidas hoodie with matching shorts, later changing into black sequined attire with boots and accessories.

"Celebration" also closed the Celebration Tour (2023–2024) in a medley with "Bitch I'm Madonna" (2015). The segment featured dancers dressed as Madonna throughout different stages of her career, a tribute to Michael Jackson, and projected images of celebrities. Mark Savage of the BBC wrote that while the show touched on themes of celebrity, sexism, and ageism, its finale ultimately suggested that the singer's greatest achievement after four decades was "the very act of being Madonna". OutInPerth was more critical of the number, remarking that although it was "a great tune to end the show," it came "nowhere close" to matching the energy of the MDNA Tour finale.

== Track listing ==
- US CD maxi-single
1. "Celebration" (Oakenfold Remix) – 6:35
2. "Celebration" (Benny Benassi Remix) – 5:31
3. "Celebration" (Paul Oakenfold Dub Mix) – 6:35
4. "Celebration" (Benny Benassi Remix Edit) – 4:01
5. "Celebration" (Benny Benassi Dub) – 6:03
6. "Celebration" (Johnny Vicious Club Remix) – 7:59
- German CD maxi-single
1. "Celebration" (Album Version) – 3:34
2. "Celebration" (Benny Benassi Remix) – 5:31
3. "Celebration" (Benny Benassi Dub) – 6:03
- iTunes remixes EP
1. "Celebration" (Benny Benassi Remix Edit) – 4:01
2. "Celebration" (Benny Benassi Remix) – 5:31
3. "Celebration" (Benny Benassi Dub) – 6:03
4. "Celebration" (Oakenfold Remix Dub) – 6:35
5. "Celebration" (Oakenfold Remix) – 6:35
6. "Celebration" (Johnny Vicious Club Remix) – 7:59
- iTunes digital single feat. Akon
1. "Celebration" (feat. Akon) – 3:54

== Credits and personnel ==
Credits adapted from the Celebration album liner notes.

- Madonna – songwriter, primary vocals, producer
- Paul Oakenfold – songwriter, producer
- Ian Green – songwriter, background vocals, additional production for The Industry Sound
- Ciaran Gribbin – songwriter
- Demacio "Demo" Castellon – recording, mixing for the Demolition Crew at WEA Studios
- Ron Taylor – Pro Tools
- Nick Banns – engineer
- Chris Gehringer – mastering at Sterling Sound
- Thierry Guetta – artwork design

== Charts ==
=== Weekly charts ===
2009–2010 chart performance for "Celebration"
| Chart (2009–2010) | Peak position |
|---|---|
| Australia (ARIA) | 40 |
| Austria (Ö3 Austria Top 40) | 8 |
| Belgium (Ultratop 50 Flanders) | 4 |
| Belgium (Ultratop 50 Wallonia) | 3 |
| Bulgaria Airplay (BAMP) | 1 |
| Canada Hot 100 (Billboard) | 5 |
| Canada AC (Billboard) | 26 |
| Canada CHR/Top 40 (Billboard) | 29 |
| Canada Hot AC (Billboard) | 10 |
| CIS Airplay (TopHit) | 1 |
| Croatia International Airplay(HRT) | 1 |
| Czech Republic Airplay (ČNS IFPI) | 5 |
| Denmark (Tracklisten) | 4 |
| European Hot 100 (Billboard) | 2 |
| Finland (Suomen virallinen lista) | 1 |
| France (SNEP) | 2 |
| Germany (GfK) | 5 |
| Global Dance Songs (Billboard) | 4 |
| Hungary (Dance Top 40) | 4 |
| Hungary (Rádiós Top 40) | 1 |
| Ireland (IRMA) | 10 |
| Italy (FIMI) | 1 |
| Japan Hot 100 (Billboard) | 5 |
| Mexico Anglo (Monitor Latino) | 8 |
| Netherlands (Dutch Top 40) | 3 |
| Netherlands (Single Top 100) | 2 |
| Norway (VG-lista) | 3 |
| Russia Airplay (TopHit) | 2 |
| Slovakia Airplay (ČNS IFPI) | 37 |
| Spain (Promusicae) | 17 |
| Scotland Singles (Official Charts) | 1 |
| Sweden (Sverigetopplistan) | 1 |
| Switzerland (Schweizer Hitparade) | 4 |
| UK Singles (Official Charts) | 3 |
| UK Dance (Official Charts) | 1 |
| US Billboard Hot 100 | 71 |
| US Adult Pop Airplay (Billboard) | 33 |
| US Dance Club Songs (Billboard) | 1 |
| US Dance Singles Sales (Billboard) | 1 |
| US Dance Airplay (Billboard) | 4 |
| US Hot Latin Songs (Billboard) | 35 |

=== Monthly charts ===
2009 monthly chart performance for "Celebration"
| Chart (2009) | Peak position |
|---|---|
| Brazil (Brasil Hot 100 Airplay) | 15 |
| Brazil (Brasil Hot Pop Songs) | 7 |

=== Year-end charts ===
2009 year-end chart performance for "Celebration"
| Chart (2009) | Position |
|---|---|
| Australia Dance (ARIA) | 42 |
| Belgium (Ultratop 50 Flanders) | 57 |
| Belgium (Ultratop 50 Wallonia) | 38 |
| Canada (Canadian Hot 100) | 73 |
| CIS (TopHit) | 29 |
| Croatia International Airplay (HRT) | 22 |
| European Hot 100 (Billboard) | 24 |
| France (SNEP) | 19 |
| Germany (GfK) | 47 |
| Hungary (Dance Top 40) | 35 |
| Hungary (Rádiós Top 40) | 29 |
| Japan (Japan Hot 100) (Billboard) | 12 |
| Japan Adult Contemporary (Billboard) | 2 |
| Netherlands (Dutch Top 40) | 32 |
| Netherlands (Single Top 100) | 37 |
| Norway Summer Period (VG-lista) | 17 |
| Russia Airplay (TopHit) | 66 |
| Sweden (Sverigetopplistan) | 27 |
| Switzerland (Schweizer Hitparade) | 38 |
| Taiwan (Hit FM) | 47 |
| UK Singles (OCC) | 165 |
| US Dance Club Songs (Billboard) | 17 |

2010 year-end chart performance for "Celebration"
| Chart (2010) | Position |
|---|---|
| European Hot 100 (Billboard) | 88 |
| Hungary (Dance Top 40) | 40 |
| Hungary (Rádiós Top 40) | 58 |

== Certifications and sales ==
Certifications and sales for "Celebration"
| Region | Certification | Certified units/sales |
|---|---|---|
| Denmark (IFPI Danmark) | Gold | 15,000^{^} |
| Finland (Musiikkituottajat) | Gold | 6,521 |
| Italy (FIMI) | Platinum | 30,000^{*} |
| Japan (RIAJ) | Gold | 100,000^{*} |
| United States Digital downloads | — | 192,000 |
^{*} Sales figures based on certification alone.^{^} Shipments figures based on certification alone.

== Release history ==
Release dates and formats for "Celebration"
| Region | Date | Format(s) | Version(s) | Label(s) | Ref. |
|---|---|---|---|---|---|
| Various | July 30, 2009 | Streaming | Original | Warner Bros. | |
| Various | July 31, 2009 | Digital download | Original | Warner Bros. | |
| United States | August 3, 2009 | Radio airplay | Original | Warner Bros. | |
| Japan | August 12, 2009 | Digital download | Original | Warner Music | |
| Canada | August 18, 2009 | Digital download (EP) | Remixes | Warner Music | |
| United States | August 18, 2009 | Digital download (EP) | Remixes | Warner Bros. | |
| Germany | September 4, 2009 | Maxi CD | Original | Warner Music | |
| Argentina | September 7, 2009 | Maxi CD | Original | Warner Music | |
| France | September 14, 2009 | CD | Original | Warner Music | |
| United Kingdom | September 14, 2009 | CD; Maxi CD | Original | Warner Bros. | |
| France | September 21, 2009 | Maxi CD | Original | Warner Music | |
| United States | October 6, 2009 | Maxi CD | Remixes | Warner Bros. | |
| United States | November 9, 2009 | Digital download | Remix featuring Akon | Warner Bros. | |
| France | December 28, 2009 | CD | Remix featuring Akon | Warner Music | |
| United States | January 26, 2010 | Contemporary hit radio | Remix featuring Akon | Warner Bros. | |

== See also ==
- Artists with the most number-ones on the U.S. Dance Club Songs chart
- List of number-one singles of 2009 (Finland)
- List of number-one hits of 2009 (Italy)
- List of number-one singles of 2009 (Scotland)
- List of number-one singles of the 2010s (Sweden)
- List of number-one dance singles of 2009 (U.S.)
- List of UK Dance Singles Chart number ones of 2009
