= Jesus Luz =

Brazilian model and DJ (born 1987)

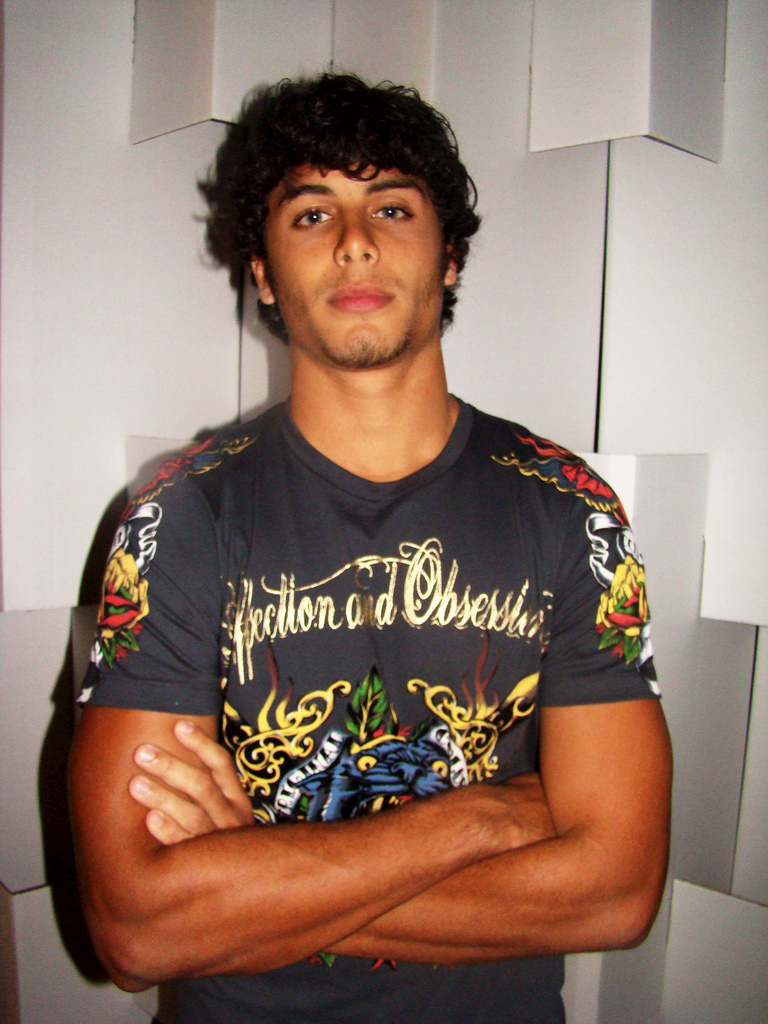
- Luz in January 2009
- Born: Jesus Pinto da Luz; 15 January 1987 (age 39); Rio de Janeiro, Brazil
- Modeling information
- Height: 1.85 m (6 ft 1 in)
- Hair color: Brown
- Eye color: Green
- Agency: Ford Models

Jesus Pinto da Luz (born 15 January 1987) is a Brazilian model, DJ and occasional actor. In 2009, he appeared in Steven Klein's celebrated photo spread, "Madonna: Blame it on Rio" for W alongside his future girlfriend, Madonna. He then appeared in photo editorials for L'Officiel Hommes, Interview and international editions of GQ, and Vogue. He has also modeled for Dolce & Gabbana, Givenchy and Intimissimi.

== Early life ==
Luz was born and raised in Rio de Janeiro. He is the son of a hairdresser, Cristiane Regina da Silva and an administrator at a public hospital in Rio. His name was given to him by his father who always admired Jesus Christ as the most philosophical mind of all time. His surname da Luz means "from light" in Portuguese. Da Luz has two younger half brothers. As a child, he moved frequently, especially after his parents split when he was five years-old. He was raised by his mother in downtown Rio.

His mother saved to send him to a private prep school when he was an adolescent and also encouraged him to pursue a career as a model. He pursued modeling and acting, working odd jobs, including as a salesman at a surf shop in Ipanema. Luz grew up in a musical environment; his uncle used to play in a rock band in Rio de Janeiro. He studied at the traditional Colégio Pedro II.

== Modelling career ==
Luz signed his first contract in 2005 for the 40 Graus Models modeling agency. He was hired by Sergio Mattos for whom he worked for three years. In 2006, he spent six months in New York, living with an aunt and learning English. Luz landed his first modeling job walking the runway in Rio Fashion Week 2007. During that period, he also studied acting at the Casa das Artes de Laranjeiras training school for actors. In 2008, Luz signed the contract with Ford Models becoming one of the highest paid male models in the world. That same year, Luz got his first major international job when Steven Klein chose him to pose alongside Madonna for a W magazine photo shoot. Rumors that the relationship moved from staged photographs to real life began in December 2008 when reports from the Brazilian press surfaced, which made Luz internationally known.

In 2009, he was featured on the summer cover of L'Officiel Hommes magazine. He was also cast in a fall campaign for Dolce & Gabbana, photographed by Klein. He was also photographed by Tom Munro for Pepe Jeans alongside Hanne Gabe Odiele and Agnete Hegelund. In Milan Fashion Week 2009, walked the runway for Dolce & Gabbana. In the same year he appeared in an underwear ad campaign for Intimissimi.

In 2010 he appeared in a campaign for TNT, of the Israeli fashion company, Honigman. He was also the cover star of the December 2010 edition of Page Six Magazine. In the same year he fronted a campaign for Brazilian underwear chain, Mash.

In 2010, he appeared in an Interview magazine editorial photographed by Mikael Jansson. In the same year, he walked the runway at São Paulo Fashion Week for Ellus. He also appeared in their ad campaign alongside Cintia Dicker. He became one of the best paid models with Ford Models, commanding as much as $100, 000 to appear at a fashion show. In 2012, he returned to Israel to shoot a new campaign for TNT. In the same year, he was photographed for Vs. magazine.

In 2015, he fronted a winter campaign with actress Paloma Bernardi for Brazilian footwear brand, Ferricelli. He also fronted the winter 2018 campaign for Brazilian fashion chain, Sallo Jeans. His social media model shoots are frequently reproduced in the media, with Instinct reproducing his photo spreads in 2024 and 2025. In 2024, he was in the autumn/winter campaign for Brazilian fashion brand, TFLOW.

He has been a cover star on Brazil's Mensch magazine on various occasions, including in November 2015, June 2021 and September 2024.

== Other endeavours ==
=== Music projects ===
Luz had a lot of DJ and musician friends in school, where he played flute. He got into DJing in 2010. Luz used to watch his friends do it and started to go to all of the electronic parties. He attended the "Dubspot", a DJ school in New York City, for three months where he was taught how to mix, how the crossfader works, and all the basic stuff to deal with the equipment. He is interested in electronic music—trance, electro-house, progressive house and tech-house. Later Luz landed high-profile gigs. For the 90-minute set he was spinning on his second professional D.J. job he was being paid around $15,000. In 2010 he collaborated with German vocal trance music group, Fragma, to release the single "What do you Want."

=== Acting ===
In 2009, he appeared in Madonna's music video, "Celebration". He also had an uncredited cameo in the 2010 film, Rio Sex Comedy. This was followed by guest appearances in Brazilian telenovelas, Aquele Beijo and Guerra dos Sexos in 2012. He later appeared in Se Eu Fosse Você in 2013, and Vai Que Cola in 2016. In the same year he starred as the love interest in Inna's music video, "Calente". In April 2017, during Holy Week, he performed at the New Jerusalem Theater in Passion of Christ, a reenactment of Jesus Christ's final days.

In 2020, Luz had a role Reality Z, a Brazilian Zombie horror series on Netflix.

=== Reality TV ===
In 2013, he competed in the ninth season of Italy's Ballando con le Stelle, which is part of the Dancing with the Stars franchise.

In 2015, he competed in the second season of Saltibum, broadcast on Rede Globo, and part of the Celebrity Splash! franchise.

In 2017, he competed in the second season of Dancing Brasil, also part of the Dancing with the Stars franchise.

== Personal life ==
He met Madonna at a photo shoot in Rio de Janeiro in December 2008 and they started a relationship. They split in 2010 after over a year together.

He also befriended Marc Jacobs, who wrote a letter to US immigration officials supporting Luz's work permit application.

=== Kabbalah ===
Luz practises Kabbalah. He began studying Kabbalah in Rio de Janeiro before meeting Madonna: "I'm just looking for something to make me strong, and Kabbalah has given me that", Luz said. The couple visited Israel in 2009 and were photographed together at the Wailing Wall in Jerusalem. He continued to attend the Kabbalah Centre New York after his relationship with Madonna ended. He has also studied Buddhism and yoga.

== Filmography ==
=== Music videos ===
Year	Song title	Artist	Ref
2009	"Celebration"	Madonna	
2011	"Running Man"	Jesus Luz and Yves Larock	
2013	"Caliente"	Inna	

=== Film & television ===
Year	Title	Role	Notes
2010	Rio Sex Comedy	Man on tour bus	Film, uncredited
2012	Aquele Beijo	Zé Paulino Bonequeiro	Telenovela, 1 episode
2012	Guerra dos Sexos	Ronaldo Brandão	Telenovela, 1 episode
2013	Se Eu Fosse Você	Breno	1 episode
2016	Vai Que Cola	Jesus	Film
2017	Amor.com		Film
2020	Reality Z	Lucas	2 episodes

== Accolades ==
In 2010, Luz won the NewNowNext Awards for Cause You're Hot, thanking his then-girlfriend Madonna in his acceptance speech.
