= Reality Z =

Brazilian television series

- Genre: Zombie horror
- Created by: Cláudio Torres
- Based on: Dead Set by Charlie Brooker
- Written by: Cláudio Torres; João Costa
- Directed by: Rodrigo Monte
- Starring: Ana Hartmann; Emílio de Mello; Carla Ribas; Ravel Andrade; Guilherme Weber; Luellem de Castro; João Pedro Zappa; Hanna Romanazzi; Jesus Luz
- Country of origin: Brazil
- Original language: Portuguese
- No. of seasons: 1
- No. of episodes: 10

Production
- Executive producers: Charlie Brooker; Annabel Jones
- Producers: Cláudio Torres; Renata Brandão
- Cinematography: Rodrigo Monte
- Editors: Sérgio Mekler; Isadora Boschiroli
- Running time: 40 minutes
- Production company: Conspiração Filmes

Original release
- Network: Netflix
- Release: 10 June 2020

Reality Z is a Brazilian horror television series based on the British television miniseries Dead Set. Produced in partnership with Conspiração Filmes and directed by Cláudio Torres, the first season of 10 episodes premiered on Netflix on 10 June 2020.

== Plot ==
The successful reality show Olympus – where TK, Jessica, Augusto, Marcos, Veronica, Madonna and Cleide were confined – is interrupted when a zombie apocalypse takes over Rio de Janeiro, forcing the production and the cast to remain locked up in the studios. A production runner, Nina, leads the fight against monsters.

== Cast ==
=== Main ===
- Ana Hartmann as Nina
- Emílio de Mello as Alberto Levi
- Carla Ribas as Ana Schmidt
- Ravel Andrade as Leo Schmidt
- Guilherme Weber as Brandão and the voice of Zeus
- Luellem de Castro as Teresa
- João Pedro Zappa as TK and Hermes
- Hanna Romanazzi as Jessica and Aphrodite
- Jesus Luz as Lucas
- Pierre Baitelli as Robson
- Leandro Daniel as Augusto and Ares
- Gabriel Canella as Marcos and Apollo
- Natália Rosa as Veronica and Athena
- Wallie Ruy as Madonna and Dionysus
- Arlinda Di Baio as Cleide and Demeter
- Julia Ianina as Cristina

=== Special guest ===
- Sabrina Sato as Davina McCall
- Leda Nagle as Nora Werneck
- Cinnara Leal as Clara
- Erom Cordeiro as Marcelo
- Bruno Bellarmino as Tysson
- Saulo Arcoverde as Eric
- Thelmo Fernandes as Peixe
- Mariah de Moraes as Producer assistant
- André Dale as José Peixoto
- Charles Fricks as Dr. Fábio Lima

== Episodes ==
No.	Title	Directed by	Written by	Original release date
1	"Olympus"	Unknown	Unknown	10 June 2020
2	"The Show is Over"	Unknown	Unknown	10 June 2020
3	"Grocery Store"	Unknown	Unknown	10 June 2020
4	"Zeus"	Unknown	Unknown	10 June 2020
5	"The End"	Unknown	Unknown	10 June 2020
6	"Wild Thing"	Unknown	Unknown	10 June 2020
7	"The Calling"	Unknown	Unknown	10 June 2020
8	"The Future"	Unknown	Unknown	10 June 2020
9	"The Gate"	Unknown	Unknown	10 June 2020
10	"Be Human"	Unknown	Unknown	10 June 2020

== Production ==
=== Development ===
On April 24, 2019, the series was announced by Charlie Brooker, creator of Dead Set on the Netflix panel at the 2019 Rio2C (Rio Creative Conference) event. A teaser with Ted Sarandos, Netflix's head of content, convincing presenter Sabrina Sato that there is no problem happening as the attraction was released on the same day on Netflix Brazil social medias to announce the series.

=== Casting ===
Alongside the initial series announcement, it was reported that actors Guilherme Weber, Jesus Luz, Ana Hartmann, Emilio de Mello, Carla Ribas, Luellem de Castro, Ravel Andrade, and Wallie Ruy would be part of the cast and Sabrina Sato as a special guest.

Soundtrack

- Pink Floyd - "Fat Old Sun"
- The Who - "Love, Reign o'er Me"
- The Velvet Underground - "After Hours"
