= Hanna Romanazzi =

Brazilian actress and model (born 1996)

- Born: Hanna Romanazzi do Vale; 4 April 1996 (age 29); Niterói, Rio de Janeiro, Brazil
- Occupations: Actress, model
- Years active: 2006–present

Hanna Romanazzi do Vale (Portuguese: [ʁomɐnaʒˈzi]; Italian: [romaˈnattsi]; born April 4, 1996) is a Brazilian actress and model.

== Biography ==
Romanazzi was born on April 4, 1996, in Niterói is a municipality of the state of Rio de Janeiro. At the age of 5 she was already working as a model and at the age of 10 she took to the stage staging plays.

Her debut on TV was in Globo's soap opera A Favorita, giving life to Camila, daughter of Zé Bob and Rita, roles of Carmo Dalla Vecchia and Christine Fernandes. Between 2009 and 2010, the actress played Rita in the morning series Ger@l.com.

In 2011, Hanna joined the cast of the remake O Astro, shown at eleven o'clock on TV Globo. The following year, she played Sofia in the 21st season of Malhação. Then, she participated in the first phase of the telenovela Alto Astral (2014) as Kitty, later played by Maitê Proença. In Babilônia she participated in the role of Cecília.

In 2015, she was invited to participate in Babilônia as Cecília, a pretty, well-resolved girl with a dubious character, who is willing to shake up Laís and Rafael's romance. In 2016, Hanna acted in the miniseries Ligações Perigosas, where she played Sofia, a student at a religious school and Cecília's best friend. Later, she joined the cast of Liberdade, Liberdade, in which she played Gironda, one of the girls from Cabaré de Virgínia, madam and ex-prostitute played by Lília Cabral.

== Personal life ==
In 2016, after meeting actor Daniel Rangel at the Trupe Cena workshop held at Rede Globo, they started dating. The relationship came to an end in November 2019.

== Filmography ==
Year	Title	Role	Notes
2008	A Favorita	Camila Porto de Souza	
2009	Ger@l.com	Rita	
2009	Xuxa em O Mistério de Feiurinha	Beauty's Daughter	
2011	O Astro	Luísa Belucci	
2013	Malhação Casa Cheia	Sofia Toledo Alende	
2014	Alto Astral	young Kitty Santana	Participation
2015	Babilônia	Cecília	Participation
2016	Ligações Perigosas	Sofia	
2016	Liberdade, Liberdade	Gironda	
2019	A Divisão	Camila Couto	First season
2020	A Divisão: O Filme	Camila Couto	
2020	Reality Z	Jéssica	Netflix
2023	Vai na Fé	young Lumiar	First phase
