= Revolver (song) =

2009 single by Madonna

- Remix maxi-single cover

Single by Madonna featuring Lil Wayne

from the album Celebration
- B-side: "Celebration"
- Released: December 29, 2009
- Recorded: 2009
- Genre: Electropop; R&B
- Length: 3:40
- Label: Warner Bros.
- Songwriters: Madonna; Lil Wayne; DJ Frank E; Carlos Centel Battey; Steven Andre Battey; Brandon Kitchen
- Producers: Madonna; DJ Frank E

Madonna singles chronology
| "Celebration" (2009) | "Revolver" (2009) | "Give Me All Your Luvin'" (2012) |

Lil Wayne singles chronology
| "4 My Town (Play Ball)" (2009) | "Revolver" (2009) | "Drop the World" (2010) |

Licensed audio
- "Revolver (feat. Lil Wayne)" on YouTube

"Revolver" is a song by American singers Madonna and Lil Wayne, included on the former's third compilation album, Celebration (2009). The song was written by Madonna, Wayne, Carlos and Steven Battey, DJ Frank E, and Brandon Kitchen. Production was in charge of Madonna and Frank E. An electropop song with elements of R&B, its lyrics compare love and sex to violence and a revolver. David Guetta, Paul van Dyk, and Tracy Young created the track's official remixes. Following a leak in May 2009, the song was released as the compilation's second single on December 29.

Upon release, critics reacted ambivalently towards "Revolver". Wayne's verse was praised by some, while others deemed the track generic and underwhelming. The song's One Love Mix by David Guetta was awarded Best Remixed Recording, Non-Classical at the 53rd Annual Grammy Awards. "Revolver" had a lukewarm chart performance. It reached the fourth spot of Billboard's Hot Dance Club Songs chart, while Guetta's remix peaked within the top 30 and 20 in Belgium and Italy. Madonna sang the track on the MDNA Tour of 2012. The use of firearms in the performance caused controversy, especially after the 2012 Aurora, Colorado, shooting.

== Background ==
In March 2009, Liz Rosenberg, Madonna's publicist, confirmed that she would be releasing a new compilation album from the first three decades of her musical career, with a planned release date of September. Three months later, Billboard magazine reported that the compilation ―named Celebration― would feature two new songs: the title track, produced by British DJ Paul Oakenfold, and "Revolver", a collaboration with rapper Lil Wayne. The latter was included only on the album's double-disc edition. "Revolver" was written by Madonna, Lil Wayne, Carlos and Steven Battey, DJ Frank E, and Brandon Kitchen. Production was in charge of the singer Frank E. Demacio Castellon did the mixing while the Pro Tools editing was arranged by Ron Taylor from Warner Bros. Records. During an interview, Frank E revealed that he'd gone to the studio two hours before his scheduled meeting with Madonna to set up and give the audio files to the recording engineer, and that the subsequent wait was incredibly nerve-wrecking for him. After the singer arrived, they recorded her vocals and the song was finished the next day. Official remixes were created by David Guetta, Paul van Dyk, and Tracy Young. While recalling his involvement with the song, Frank E expressed his gratitude at having had the opportunity to work with Madonna, but wasn't pleased with the final result:

"I will never forget the feeling of leaving that session after vocal producing [Madonna], and thinking to myself, 'it can’t it really get any harder than this'. I've taken that mentality into every other session I've been in, and it's helped me make the session and song more of a success. Unfortunately, the mix sounded like crap and the song flopped, but hey, you win some and you lose some".

== Composition and release ==
"Revolver"
20-second audio sample of "Revolver". Madonna sings the refrain, My love's a revolver/My sex is a killer/Do you wanna die happy?

Musically, "Revolver" has been noted as recalling the "electro R&B" from Madonna's eleventh studio album, Hard Candy (2008). It presents "sirenesque" synths, and shares its title with a Lil Wayne song, and a movie directed by Guy Ritchie, Madonna's former husband. According to the sheet music published by Alfred Publishing Inc., "Revolver" is set in the common time with a moderate tempo of 120 beats per minute. It follows in the basic sequence of B♭m–D♭–A♭–B♭m–D♭–A♭ as its chord progression, while Madonna's voice spans from the tonal nodes of A♭_{3} to E♭_{5}.

The lyrics equate love and sex to violence and a revolver; My love's a revolver/My sex is a killer/Do you wanna die happy?, she sings in the refrain. The bridge has Wayne, "[giving] himself loads of big-ups when it comes to the women": The victim didn't complain, she just screamed, 'Shoot again'/I gave her extra rounds/My barrel twist around/I am Mr. Shoot 'Em Down/I leave hearts on the ground. An early demo of "Revolver" leaked on May 11, 2009, while the final version debuted online three months later, on September 17. Remixes and physical releases were issued from December 29 to February 10, 2010.

== Critical reception ==
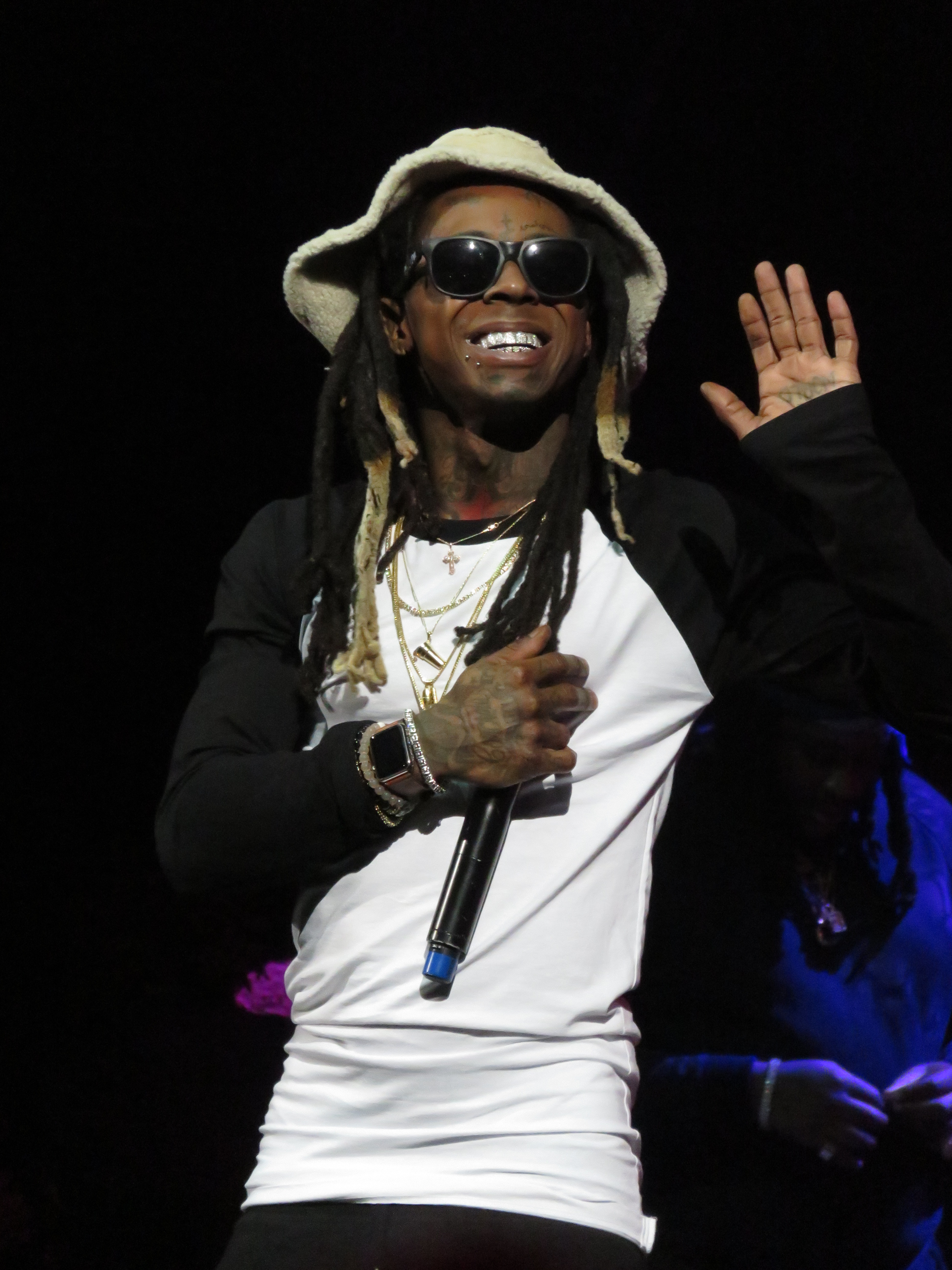
Some critics praised Lil Wayne's (picture) verse, while others weren't convinced with his participation on the song.

Critical feedback towards "Revolver" was mixed. Rolling Stone's Daniel Krepps felt the final version was more befitting to Madonna than the leaked demo, and compared it to "Radar" (2009) by Britney Spears. He concluded by referring to the track as, "probably the most violent love song ever". Also from Rolling Stone, Rob Sheffield wrote: "[Madonna's] hitmaking genius is unmatched and —with the new Eurocheeseblast 'Celebration' and the Lil Wayne duet 'Revolver'— undiminished". From Entertainment Weekly, Leah Greenblatt considered the track a "glitched-out dance-floor stomper". Writing for MTV, Shaheem Reid said "Revolver" was a "sugary ditty", and singled out Lil Wayne's verse. On this vein, The Daily Telegraph's Sarah Crompton said "Revolver" shows off Lil Wayne's skills as a singer better than Madonna's. By contrast, Slant Magazine's Eric Henderson deemed it a "clumsy" collaboration.

Joey Guerra from the Houston Chronicle said it was a generic track that was, "more filler than truly fascinating". Joseph Brannigan Lynch from Entertainment Weekly deemed it underwhelming; "[A]nyone hoping this collaboration with Wayne would mean a new direction for [Madonna] will be disappointed. 'Revolver' is [...] not bad by any stretch, but it certainly won't end up on the next greatest-hits collection she releases ten years from now". The author, nonetheless, singled out the "charmingly frivolous lyrics". The Guardian's Jude Rogers was not impressed with the track's lyrical theme: "Madonna loves metaphors [but] there have been better ideas". Paul Schrodt from Slant Magazine wrote: "Forget the uncharacteristic desperate crassness of choosing the then-hot Lil Wayne as a collaborator. Also, ignore the half-heartedness of the track’s electroclash gestures. What you have left is a sex-equals-guns metaphor that, with each passing year in America, grows more and more tone deaf".

Both "Celebration" and "Revolver were compared negatively to "Justify My Love" and "Rescue Me", songs recorded for 1990's The Immaculate Collection, Madonna's first compilation album. Douglas Wolk from Pitchfork opined that, "whereas the new songs on Immaculate pointed [Madonna's] way forward for the next decade, ['Celebration' and 'Revolver'] just sound like throwaways". At the 53rd Annual Grammy Awards, David Guetta's One Love Club Mix of "Revolver" won in the category of Best Remixed Recording, Non-Classical.

== Chart performance ==
"Revolver" had a lukewarm commercial performance. On October 17, 2009, it debuted on the Canadian Hot 100 at number 95, remaining in that position for one week before dropping off the chart. On the issue dated January 16, 2010, the song made a re-entry at a higher position of 47. Also in the week of January 16, the song debuted on Billboard's Hot Dance Club Songs chart at number 41, eventually reaching the fourth position over a month later. In the United Kingdom, the track debuted on the singles chart at number 188, but after a few weeks it jumped to its peak position of 130. It fared better in Ireland, where it reached the 41st spot. In Spain, the single charted at number 39 for one week only.

Guetta's One Love Mix peaked at number 21 on Belgium's Flanders region. It saw a better reception on the Wallonia charts, where it peaked at number 12. The song also reached the 12th spot of Italian charts. Additionally, it was certified gold by the Federation of the Italian Music Industry (FIMI) for shipment of 15,000 copies. "Revolver" peaked at the sixth spot of the Finnish charts. In the Czech Republic, it debuted at number 66 and, after seven weeks, reached a peak of 22.

== Live performance and controversy ==
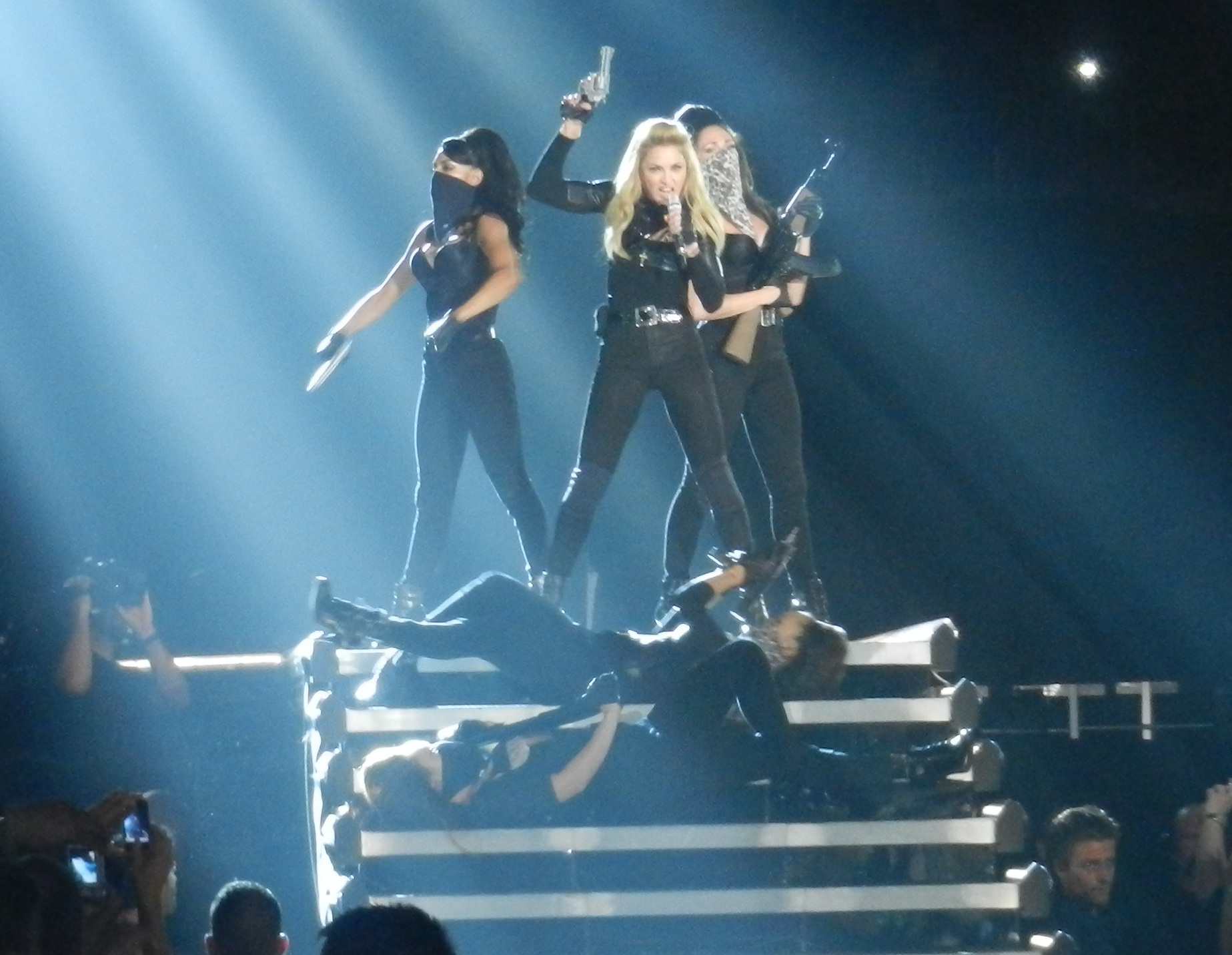
Madonna and her dancers perform "Revolver" on the MDNA Tour. The use of firearms during the performance was met with backlash and caused controversy among the public.

Madonna sang "Revolver" on the MDNA Tour of 2012. The performance had a video cameo by Wayne, and saw the singer donning a "curve-hugging" black bodysuit, engaging in a gun fight with dancers, which included a "paramilitary-looking chap who rappelled down from the ceiling". She branded a Kalashnikov rifle while they held Israeli Uzi submachine guns. Every time Madonna shot the at the dancers, images of blood and gore would flash on the backdrop screens.

The use of weaponry caused controversy, specially in wake of the Aurora, Colorado theater shooting. In Scotland, Madonna defied a local ban that prevented her from brandishing fake weaponry on stage. While on the concert, the singer joked about the ban and told the audience: "Due to your laws here they might pull the plug on me so if they cut us off suddenly, write to your local MP". A spokesman for Mothers Against Guns felt the performance was, "in bad taste, but given what happened in Colorado it is even worse. She should know better".

After attending the Denver concert, Mile High Sports personality Peter Burns said he was "taken aback" by the use of guns; "you could see people kinda looking at each other [...] I heard the word 'Colorado' you know, 'Aurora', 'Shooting' [...] [it was] a little bit unsettling. I saw two or three people get up and grab their stuff and actually leave their seats". Liz Rosenberg told the HuffPost that, "[Madonna] would rather cancel her show than censor her art. Her entire career, she has fought against people telling her what she can and cannot do. She's not about to start listening to them now". Madonna commented on the controversy in an interview for Good Morning America, saying that she would not alter the performances: "[T]hat would be like asking people to not have guns in action movies... I mean, the thing is, guns don't kill people, people kill people. That whole first section of the show is like an action movie, and I was playing a super-vixen who wanted revenge".

Despite the controversy, critical reception towards the performance was mixed. From The Scotsman, Gary Flockhart said it was "exhilarating to watch, if in bad taste". The Plain Dealer's Chuck Yarborough criticized Madonna's auto tuned vocals. By contrast, Marc-André Lemieux, writing for Le Journal de Montréal, gave a positive review and said that, "the aggressiveness [shown by Madonna] was nothing wrong. On the contrary. We felt that she was invested, passionate and even possessed". The performance of the song at the November 19–20, 2012, shows in Miami's American Airlines Arena were recorded and released in Madonna's fourth live album, MDNA World Tour (2013).

== Track listing and formats ==
- iTunes digital download
1. "Revolver" (Madonna vs. David Guetta One Love Remix) – 2:59
2. "Celebration" (Remix featuring Akon) – 3:55
- European / US / Argentine CD Maxi-single / Digital download
1. "Revolver" (Madonna vs. David Guetta One Love Version) [featuring Lil Wayne] – 3:16
2. "Revolver" (Madonna vs. David Guetta One Love Version) – 2:59
3. "Revolver" (Madonna vs. David Guetta One Love Remix) – 4:31
4. "Revolver" (Paul van Dyk Remix) – 8:35
5. "Revolver" (Paul van Dyk Dub) – 8:35
6. "Revolver" (Tracy Young's Shoot to Kill Remix) – 9:24
7. "Celebration" (Remix featuring Akon) – 3:55
8. "Celebration" (Felguk Love Remix) – 6:37
- European / US 12" Vinyl single
1. "Revolver" (Madonna vs. David Guetta One Love Remix) – 4:31
2. "Revolver" (Paul van Dyk Remix) – 8:35
3. "Revolver" (Tracy Young's Shoot to Kill Remix) – 9:24
4. "Revolver" (Paul van Dyk Dub) – 8:35
5. "Revolver" (Madonna vs. David Guetta One Love Version) [featuring Lil Wayne] – 3:16
6. "Celebration" (Remix featuring Akon) – 3:55
7. "Celebration" (Felguk Love Remix) – 6:37

== Credits and personnel ==
Credits adapted from the Celebration album and Maxi single liner notes.

- Madonna – writer, vocals and record producer
- Lil Wayne – writer and vocals
- DJ Frank E – writer and record producer
- Carlos Battey – writer
- Steven Battey – writer
- Brandon Kitchen – writer
- Demacio Castellon – mixing
- Ron Taylor – Pro Tools editing
- David Guetta and Afrojack – remixers (One Love remixes)
- Paul Van Dyk – remixer and additional production
- Tracy Young – remixer and original production
- Akon – remixer and vocals ("Celebration" feat. Akon)
- Felguk – remixer and additional production

== Charts ==
=== Weekly charts ===
Weekly chart performance for "Revolver"
| Chart (2009–10) | Peak position |
|---|---|
| Belgium (Ultratop 50 Flanders) | 21 |
| Belgium (Ultratop 50 Wallonia) | 12 |
| Canada Hot 100 (Billboard) | 47 |
| Czech Republic Airplay (ČNS IFPI) | 22 |
| Denmark (Tracklisten) | 30 |
| Finland (Suomen virallinen lista) | 6 |
| France (SNEP) | 25 |
| Global Dance Songs (Billboard) | 6 |
| Ireland (IRMA) | 41 |
| Italy (FIMI) | 12 |
| Netherlands (Dutch Top 40) | 9 |
| Poland Dance (ZPAV) | 43 |
| Russia Airplay (TopHit) | 113 |
| Spain (Promusicae) | 39 |
| UK Singles (OCC) | 130 |
| US Dance Club Songs (Billboard) | 4 |
| US Dance Singles Sales (Billboard) | 2 |

=== Year-end charts ===
Year-end chart performance for "Revolver"
| Chart (2010) | Peak position |
|---|---|
| Belgium Dance (Ultratop Flanders) (One Love remix) | 85 |
| Belgium (Ultratop Wallonia) (One Love remix) | 42 |
| Italy (FIMI) | 54 |
| Italy Airplay (EarOne) | 65 |

== Certifications ==
Certifications and sales for "Revolver"
| Region | Certification | Certified units/sales |
|---|---|---|
| Italy (FIMI) | Gold | 15,000^{*} |
^{*} Sales figures based on certification alone.

== Release history ==
Release dates for "Revolver"
| Region | Date | Format | Label | Ref. |
|---|---|---|---|---|
| Various | December 29, 2009 | Digital download | Warner Bros. | |
| Europe | January 22, 2010 | CD Maxi single | Warner Bros. | |
| United States | January 26, 2010 | CD Maxi single | Warner Bros. | |
| Argentina | February 5, 2010 | CD Maxi single | Warner Bros. | |
| Europe | February 5, 2010 | 12" Vinyl | Warner Bros. | |
| United States | February 9, 2010 | 12" Vinyl | Warner Bros. | |
