= Ciaran Gribbin =

Irish singer-songwriter, guitarist, and producer (born 1976)

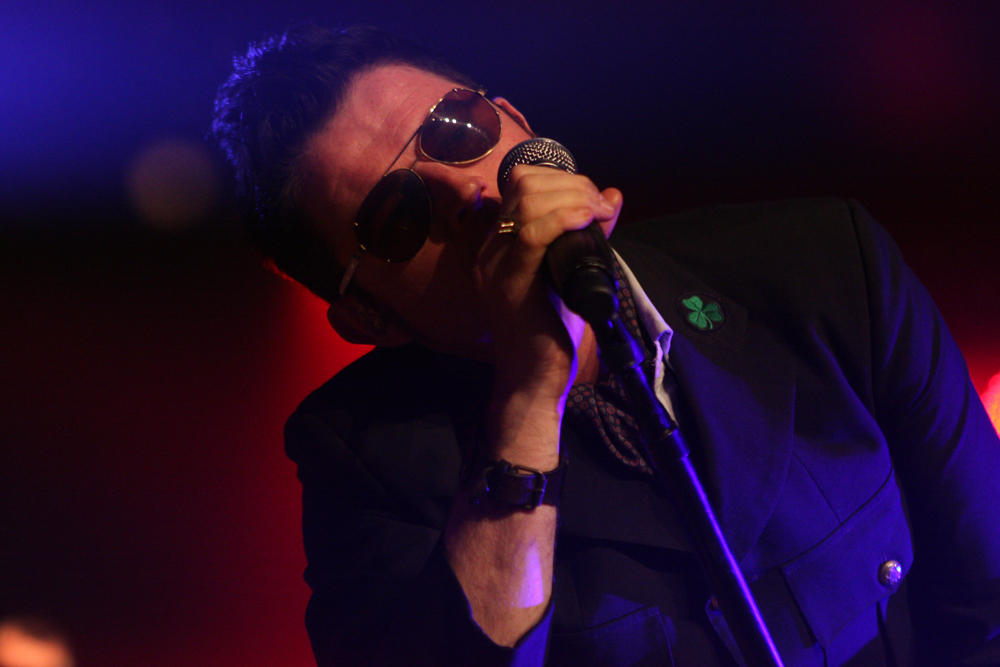
- Gribbin onstage with INXS

Background information
- Also known as: Joe Echo
- Born: 1976 (age 49–50); Castledawson, Northern Ireland
- Genres: Rock
- Occupations: Singer, songwriter
- Instruments: Vocals, guitar
- Formerly of: INXS
- Website: ciarangribbin.com

Ciaran Lawrence Gribbin (born 1976) is a Northern Irish singer-songwriter, guitarist and producer who hails from Castledawson, Northern Ireland.

== Career ==
=== Early career ===
Gribbin began writing songs at the age of nine. He formed a small band with his two best friends, and for years they toured the pubs in Belfast, Northern Ireland where he was born. At 20 years of age, Gribbin studied music at the School of Music in Bangor, County Down, Northern Ireland. Upon leaving college, he formed the band, Leya, which lasted seven years. The band put out one album, titled Watch You Don't Take Off. Leya toured with bands such as Snow Patrol, Scissor Sisters, Franz Ferdinand and Embrace. Gribbin also performed backing vocals on Snow Patrol's album Eyes Open.

=== Joe Echo and collaborations ===
After Leya disbanded, Gribbin continued to work with the members of Leya on various projects, under the name of Joe Echo as well as collaborating/co-writing with international artists including Deadmau5 and Paul Oakenfold, with whom he co-wrote Madonna's track, "Celebration", for which he received a Grammy nomination. Gribbin also toured, under the name Joe Echo, with many artists including Gotye, Powderfinger, The Script and opened for Sir Paul McCartney at the Hard Rock Calling Festival in Hyde Park, London. Gribbin wrote and produced soundtrack albums for the films Killing Bono and Heartless.

Ciaran also released some original music under Joe Echo in digital format.

=== INXS ===
In 2009, while supporting Paolo Nutini on his Australian tour under Joe Echo, Gribbin met INXS keyboardist and songwriter Andrew Farriss at a house party in Sydney. Over the next 12 months, Farriss and Gribbin became close friends and in May 2011 the two songwriters got together for a songwriting session. The members of INXS were impressed with Gribbin's vocal and songwriting ability and promptly asked him to audition for lead vocalist of their band. In November 2011, Gribbin performed his first show with INXS in Arequipa, Peru in front of 7,000 people and two nights later performed in front of 30,000 people, headlining the Personal Festival in Buenos Aires, Argentina. He replaced their former lead singer, J.D. Fortune.

Gribbin performed over 50 shows as INXS' frontman. Two of the songs Gribbin co-wrote with Andrew Farris have been released by INXS. "Tiny Summer" was a free download single. The second single, "We Are United", was performed in Australia's capital city, Canberra, at the Australia Day celebrations in January 2012 in front of a television audience of one million, and was released to mark this occasion.

=== Recent work ===
Gribbin is continuing to work on many projects including his own solo debut album. He has recently been producing and writing records for young music artists, including remixing for Thai artist Tata Young, writing songs for the Asian pop market and working with some of the biggest names in Hollywood, writing music for movies.

Gribbin recently announced on The Morning Show on the Seven Network that his new single "My Killer, My King" will be released and available for download on iTunes on Friday, 16 August 2013.

== Personal life ==
Gribbin is the eldest of five children. He currently lives in Wollongong, Australia with his wife, Donna, and their son.

== Awards and nomination ==
=== Environmental Music Prize ===
The Environmental Music Prize is a quest to find a theme song to inspire action on climate and conservation. It commenced in 2022.

Year	Nominee / work	Award	Result	Ref.
2022	"What If"	Environmental Music Prize	Nominated	
