= Finally Enough Love: 50 Number Ones =

2022 remix album by Madonna

Remix album by Madonna
- Released: August 19, 2022
- Recorded: 1982–2019
- Genre: Dance
- Length: 223:48
- Labels: Rhino; Warner
- Producer: Madonna

Madonna chronology
Madame X: Music from the Theater Xperience (2021)	Finally Enough Love: 50 Number Ones (2022)	Deadpool & Wolverine: Madonna's "Like a Prayer" EP (2024)

Finally Enough Love: 50 Number Ones is a remix album by American singer Madonna, released through Warner Records. Its abridged 16-track edition, simply titled Finally Enough Love, had a pre-release on streaming services on June 24, 2022, while the full 50-track edition and all physical formats were released on August 19, 2022. The album marks Madonna achieving a record 50 number ones on the US Billboard Dance Club Songs chart, the most number ones of any artist on any single Billboard chart. The title derives from the lyrics of her 50th number one, "I Don't Search I Find". It is also the first release in a multi-year reissue campaign with Warner, commemorating the 40th anniversary of Madonna's recording career.

Finally Enough Love received generally favorable reviews from critics. Commercially, the album peaked at number one in Australia, Belgium, Portugal, French-speaking Switzerland (Romandy), the Netherlands, and the international album chart of Croatia, while reaching the top five in France, Germany, Hungary, Italy, Ireland, Spain, Switzerland and the United Kingdom. The album debuted at number eight in US Billboard 200, making Madonna the first female artist in the USA to have a top-ten album in the last five consecutive decades (1980s–2020s). Madonna also became the first woman to have an Australian number-one album in five different decades. Finally Enough Love was certified Platinum by the British Phonographic Industry (BPI).

== Background and conception ==
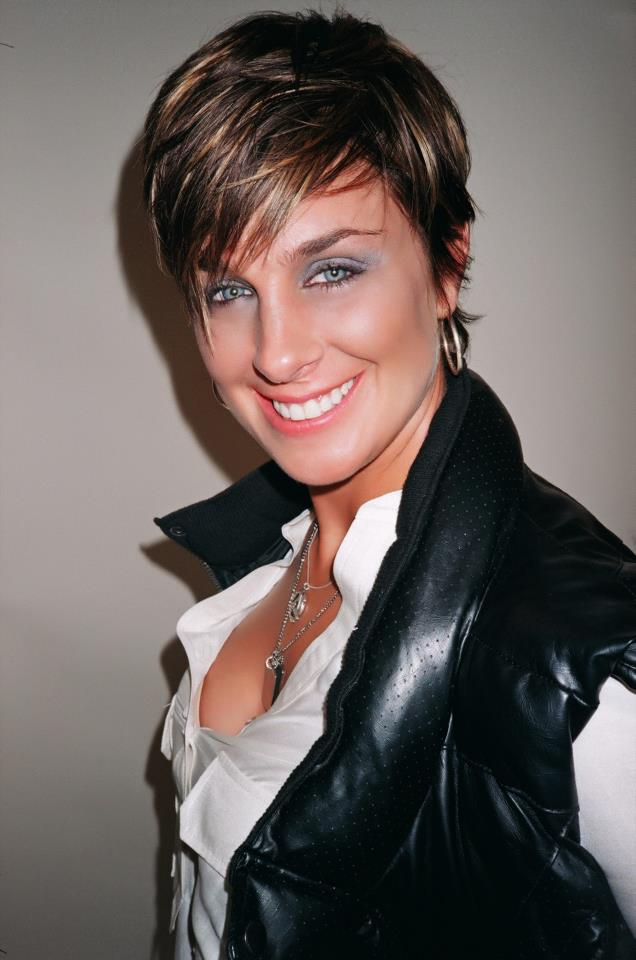
Tracy Young remixed three tracks on the album, including the previously unreleased version of "Nothing Fails".

On the issue date of February 22, 2020, Madonna achieved milestone 50th number-one song on the US Billboard Dance Club Songs chart with "I Don't Search I Find" from the album Madame X, her final release with Interscope Records. She became the first act in history to score at least 50 number one songs on a single Billboard chart, as well as across five decades. Madonna expressed her gratitude in a statement to Billboard; "dance is my first love [...] so every time one of my songs is celebrated in the clubs and recognized on the charts it feels like home".

In August 2021, coinciding with her 63rd birthday, Madonna officially announced her return to Warner Records in a global partnership which grants the label her entire recorded music catalog, including the last three Interscope albums. Under the contract, Madonna launched a series of catalog reissues beginning in 2022. In January 2022, Madonna revealed on Instagram that she was working on a remix album titled Remix Revolution. She shared photos of her in a recording studio perfecting 50 dance remixes alongside Mike Dean with a little help from Honey Dijon. The release was finally announced on May 4, 2022, with the title Finally Enough Love: 50 Number Ones, which is derived from the lyrics of "I Don't Search I Find". Regarding the title, Madonna explained:

I named this record Finally Enough Love, because at the end of the day, love is what makes the world go round. It also is representative of one of my biggest loves in life, which is dance. I love to dance, and I love to inspire people to dance—so with 50 number one dance hits, that is a lot of love to share.

A dance music compilation, it includes all of Madonna's dance number-one songs, with the exception of "Causing a Commotion", as well as one song each from her two double A-side number ones, "Lucky Star" (paired with "Holiday") and "Angel" (paired with "Into the Groove"). Before the chart's rules were changed in February 1991 to disallow whole albums from charting, the whole of Madonna's 1987 remix album You Can Dance topped the chart; three of that album's seven standard tracks are included. The album also features five previously unreleased remixes—"Keep It Together", "American Life", "Nothing Fails", "Turn Up the Radio", and "Living for Love"—by Shep Pettibone, Felix da Housecat, Tracy Young, and Offer Nissim. The album was curated by Madonna herself, while Mike Dean remastered all the tracks. The 3-CD set has a classic image of Madonna on the cover. David T. Farr from Sturgis Journal commented, the collection "is packaged great".

== Release and promotion ==
Putting this project together was like taking a trip down memory lane. It was a cathartic, emotional experience and brought back so many memories. I realized how hard I've worked, and what an adventurous musical life I've led! Most importantly, it made me realize how meaningful dance music has always been to me.

— Madonna, about the album

There are two main releases of the album: a full 50-track edition titled Finally Enough Love: 50 Number Ones and an abridged 16-track edition simply titled Finally Enough Love. Both editions were published for sale on CD, vinyl, and digital album. The 16-track edition had a pre-release on streaming services on June 24, 2022, while the 50-track edition and all other formats were released on August 19, 2022. The 50-track vinyl edition, which was a limited release, quickly sold out, which led to the release of a second vinyl edition of the album on June 23, 2023, to coincide with Pride Month; this second edition features six different brightly-colored discs.

"Into the Groove" (You Can Dance Remix Edit) was released digitally on May 4, 2022, to accompany the album's announcement. It charted at number 14 on the US Billboard Dance/Electronic Digital Song Sales for the week of May 21, 2022. Four additional songs were made available on digital platform prior to the release of the album—"Deeper and Deeper" (David's Radio Edit), "Ray of Light" (Sasha Ultra Violet Mix Edit), "Holiday" (7" Version) and "Impressive Instant" (Peter Rauhofer's Universal Radio Mixshow Mix) along with their accompanying music videos on YouTube. "Turn Up the Radio" (Offer Nissim Remix Edit) was also released as a promotional single after the compilation's release.

On June 23, 2022, Madonna put on a variety show titled WoW, Finally Enough Love as a part of New York City Pride. It kicked off with appearances from RuPaul's Drag Race contestant Bob the Drag Queen as well as Violet Chachki, Laganja Estranja and Pixie Aventura, who performed to some of Madonna's songs, from "Vogue" to "Justify My Love". Madonna herself performed "Hung Up", "Material Gworrllllllll!", and "Celebration". On August 10, Madonna promoted the album on The Tonight Show Starring Jimmy Fallon and performed "Music" on its "Classroom Instruments" segment. The same day, Madonna celebrated the album's release with a roller disco party at DiscOasis in Central Park, New York. Questlove served as DJ for the event, spinning Madonna's biggest songs as well as disco classics throughout the night.

== Critical reception ==
Professional ratings
Review scores
Source	Rating
AllMusic	4.5/5 stars
AllMusic (16-track)	4/5 stars
Jenesaispop	4/5 stars
Metro Weekly	3/5 stars
Pitchfork (16-track)	6.5/10
Polityka	5/5 stars
Record Collector	4/4 stars
Rolling Stone Germany	3.5/5 stars
Tom Hull – on the Web	B+
Washington Blade	3/4 stars

AllMusic senior editor Stephen Thomas Erlewine stated that the album "pushes Madonna's artistry to the forefront, as it shows a musician who continually engages with fashions, trends, and innovations." Although the 16-track edition "naturally pales in comparison to its parent set", he said that its concentration and mixes still makes it "feel fresh [and] presents a portrait of Madonna as a dance artist, not a pop star." Ben Cardew from Pitchfork felt that Madonna's selections for the 16-track edition "offer a curiously distorted look back at her history on the dancefloor," and pointed lesser names of remixers being "over-represented on the second half of the album." Sebas E. Alonso from Jenesaispop praised Mike Dean's remastering of Madonna's older songs which makes them "sound so current". He also declared that "few artists could publish a compilation of remixes as rich as this one..."

Katie Bain from Billboard wrote that the album further cemented Madonna's position "as an icon, innovator and general party-starter" and it "demonstrates not only the progression of Madonna's catalog, but the sound of dance music itself." Bartek Chaciński from Polityka said that the album "explains well the phenomenon of the artist, who, in terms of publishing, took her first steps in the decline of disco, and later her songs accompanied the domination of house on the dance floors or the madness around EDM." Sassan Niasseri from Rolling Stone Germany called the album "a pretty confident statement" which demonstrates the change in the demand for variations made especially for the dance floor across four decades. According to Cat Woods of Shondaland, the album "highlights and enhances [Madonna's] undeniable mark on pop music" as well as "remind[ing] us that her talent for nailing the pop zeitgeist is irrefutable." Joey DiGuglielmo from the Washington Blade, said that the collection "(eventually) starts sounding like little more than Hooked on Madonna, of the famous Hooked on Classics series from the '80s, which set classical themes to dance beats. Of course, some of that is to be expected given the nature of the release, but as an actual experience, it's occasionally tedious", concluded.

In a mixed response, George Varga from The San Diego Union-Tribune concluded that "the result on Finally Some Love: 50 Number Ones is an uneven hodgepodge that finds Madonna doing a disservice to her fans and her legacy". Sean Maunier from Metro Weekly gave a generally positive review to the album calling it an "eclectic compilation in its own right", but he felt both the scope and selection of remix tracks it presented made it feel a "little anemic", given the "overwhelming volume and diversity of Madonna remixes out there".

== Commercial performance ==
According to a representative for Rhino Records, the pre-sales of the vinyl format of Finally Enough Love: 50 Number Ones sold out in less than 48 hours. Finally Enough Love entered at number eight on the Billboard 200, with 30,000 album-equivalent units. It became the top-selling album of the week, with pure sales of 28,000 units, consisting of 23,000 physical and 5,000 digital copies. In doing so, Madonna became the first woman with a top-ten album in each of the last five decades, from the 1980s to the 2020s; among women only Barbra Streisand has top-ten albums in most decades, with six (1960s–2010s). Finally Enough Love is the first remix album to reach the top ten on the Billboard 200 since 2014, and the highest-charting electronic/dance remix album since 2010. Additionally, the album topped the US Top Dance/Electronic Albums, and Billboard 200's components Top Current Album Sales as well Vinyl Albums, with 12,000 copies on vinyl, making it Madonna's largest sales week for a vinyl album since Luminate Data began tracking sales in 1991. As of April 2023, the compilation had sold 25,000 vinyls in the US according to Luminate.

With three-day physical sales of 2,160 copies in Japan, the album debuted at number 22 on the Oricon Albums Chart as well as number six on the Oricon International Albums Chart. It also entered Billboard Japan's Hot Albums chart at number 25, based on combined physical and digital units. Finally Enough Love debuted atop the ARIA Albums Chart dated August 29, 2022, making it Madonna's 12th number-one album in Australia. She broke her tie with U2 and Eminem to become the second act with the most chart-topping albums in Australia, behind the Beatles and Jimmy Barnes, each having 14 number ones. Madonna also became the first ever woman to have a number-one album in five different decades in Australia.

In the United Kingdom, the album entered the UK Albums Chart at number three, with sales of 14,132 units. It became Madonna's 23rd top-ten entry on the chart. According to the Official Charts Company, the compilation had sold 324,182 copies in the UK, as of March 2026. On January 2, 2026, the British Phonographic Industry (BPI) certified the album Platinum, for combined sales and album-equivalent units of over 300,000 units in the United Kingdom. It has accumulated 73 non-consecutive weeks in the Top 100, making this her tenth album to do so. In France, Finally Enough Love debuted and peaked at number two with 6,400 album-equivalent units, of which 92% represented physical copies. The compilation also debuted at number two in a number of European countries, including Germany, Ireland, Italy, Spain, and Switzerland, while topping the charts in Belgium, the Netherlands, and Portugal, as well as the Croatian International album chart.

== Recognition ==
Prior to its official release, Tamara Palmer from Grammy Awards' website lumped Madonna with other artists in "reinvigorating the art of the remix" in 2022, further commenting that Finally Enough Love brings back the concept of a big budget remix album in the mainstream music spotlight. Turkish newspaper Hürriyet named Madonna one of the most important representatives of disco culture in the 1980s, and gave her credit for being part of the rise during the ongoing decade. Variety's Mike Wass called her "the reigning monarch of clubland". Helen Brown from Financial Times recognizes Madonna's longevity with the release of this album, and quotes John Earls of Classic Pop magazine as saying: "After assiduously avoiding it for so long, is her biggest acknowledgment of pop mortality" as a capitulation to the "lucrative" nostalgia market.

Upon release, the culture editorial staff of Swedish newspaper Dagens Nyheter picked it up as one of their five favorite "cultural events" of the week. Variety ranked album's tracks, with "Into the Groove" (You Can Dance Remix Edit) topping the list, describing the song: "Is arguably the template for the club-pop hybrids that started in the '80s and continue to be released to this very day". The song was nominated at the Gay Italia Awards in the category International Song of the Year.

== Track listing ==
Disc one
No.	Title	Writer(s)	Length
1.	"Holiday" (7" Version)	Lisa Stevens; Curtis Hudson	4:18
2.	"Like a Virgin" (7" Version)	William Steinberg; Thomas Kelly	3:36
3.	"Material Girl" (7" Version)	Peter Brown; Robert Rans	3:58
4.	"Into the Groove" (You Can Dance Remix Edit)	Madonna; Stephen Bray	4:44
5.	"Open Your Heart" (Video Version)	Madonna; Gardner Cole; Peter Rafelson	4:26
6.	"Physical Attraction" (You Can Dance Remix Edit)	Reggie Lucas	3:52
7.	"Everybody" (You Can Dance Remix Edit)	Madonna	4:34
8.	"Like a Prayer" (7" Remix / Edit)	Madonna; Patrick Leonard	5:42
9.	"Express Yourself" (Remix / Edit)	Madonna; Bray	4:59
10.	"Keep It Together" (Alternate Single Remix)	Madonna; Bray	4:51
11.	"Vogue" (Single Version)	Madonna; Shep Pettibone	4:20
12.	"Justify My Love" (Orbit Edit)	Madonna; Ingrid Chavez; Lenny Kravitz	4:31
13.	"Erotica" (Underground Club Mix)	Madonna; Anthony Shimkin; Pettibone	4:52
14.	"Deeper and Deeper" (David's Radio Edit)	Madonna; Shimkin; Pettibone	4:02
15.	"Fever" (Radio Edit)	John Davenport; Eddie Cooley	5:07
16.	"Secret" (Junior's Luscious Single Mix)	Madonna; Dallas Austin	4:15
Total length:			77:55

Disc two
No.	Title	Writer(s)	Length
1.	"Bedtime Story" (Junior's Single Mix)	Björk; Marius De Vries; Nellee Hooper	4:52
2.	"Don't Cry for Me Argentina" (Miami Mix Edit)	Timothy Rice	4:28
3.	"Frozen" (Extended Club Mix Edit)	Madonna; Leonard	4:36
4.	"Ray of Light" (Sasha Ultra Violet Mix Edit)	Madonna; Dave Curtiss; Clive Muldoon; Christine Leach; William Orbit	5:06
5.	"Nothing Really Matters" (Club 69 Radio Mix)	Madonna; Leonard	3:43
6.	"Beautiful Stranger" (Calderone Radio Mix)	Madonna; Orbit	4:02
7.	"American Pie" (Richard "Humpty" Vission Radio Mix)	Don McLean	4:25
8.	"Music" (Deep Dish Dot Com Radio Edit)	Madonna; Mirwais Ahmadzaï	4:11
9.	"Don't Tell Me" (Thunderpuss Video Remix)	Madonna; Joe Henry; Ahmadzaï	4:08
10.	"What It Feels Like for a Girl" (Above and Beyond Club Radio Edit)	Madonna; David Torn; Guy Sigsworth	3:43
11.	"Impressive Instant" (Peter Rauhofer's Universal Radio Mixshow Mix)	Madonna; Ahmadzaï	5:30
12.	"Die Another Day" (Deepsky Radio Edit)	Madonna; Ahmadzaï	4:06
13.	"American Life" (Felix da Housecat's Devin Dazzle Edit)	Madonna; Ahmadzaï	3:21
14.	"Hollywood" (Calderone & Quayle Edit)	Madonna; Ahmadzaï	3:59
15.	"Me Against the Music" (Peter Rauhofer Radio Mix; Britney Spears featuring Madonna)	Britney Spears; Thabiso Nkhereanye; Gary O'Brien; Madonna; Terius Nash; Christopher Stewart; Penelope Magnet	3:42
16.	"Nothing Fails" (Tracy Young's Underground Radio Edit)	Madonna; Jem Griffiths; Sigsworth	4:30
17.	"Love Profusion" (Ralphi Rosario House Vocal Edit)	Madonna; Ahmadzaï	3:55
Total length:			77:05

Disc three
No.	Title	Writer(s)	Length
1.	"Hung Up" (SDP Extended Vocal Edit)	Madonna; Stuart Price; Benny Andersson; Björn Ulvaeus	4:56
2.	"Sorry" (PSB Maxi Mix Edit)	Madonna; Price	4:31
3.	"Get Together" (Jacques Lu Cont Vocal Edit)	Madonna; Anders Bagge; Peer Åström; Price	4:22
4.	"Jump" (Axwell Remix Edit)	Madonna; Henry; Price	4:44
5.	"4 Minutes" (Bob Sinclar Space Funk Edit; featuring Justin Timberlake and Timbaland)	Madonna; Justin Timberlake; Timothy Mosley; Nathaniel Hills	3:22
6.	"Give It 2 Me" (Eddie Amador Club 5 Edit)	Madonna; Pharrell Williams	4:55
7.	"Celebration" (Benny Benassi Remix Edit)	Madonna; Ciaran Gribbin; Ian Green; Paul Oakenfold	3:58
8.	"Give Me All Your Luvin'" (Party Rock Remix; featuring LMFAO and Nicki Minaj)	Madonna; Maritn Picandet; Michael Tordjman; Maya Arulpragasam; Onika Maraj	3:59
9.	"Girl Gone Wild" (Avicii's UMF Mix)	Madonna; Jenson Vaughan; Benny Benassi; Alle Benassi	5:14
10.	"Turn Up the Radio" (Offer Nissim Remix Edit)	Madonna; Jade Williams; Solveig; Tordjman	4:54
11.	"Living for Love" (Offer Nissim Promo Mix)	Madonna; Uzoechi Emenike; Maureen McDonald; Toby Gad; Thomas Pentz; Ariel Rechtshaid	5:52
12.	"Ghosttown" (Dirty Pop Intro Mix)	Madonna; Evan Bogart; Sean Douglas; Jason Evigan	5:20
13.	"Bitch I'm Madonna" (Sander Kleinenberg Video Edit; featuring Nicki Minaj)	Madonna; McDonald; Gad; Pentz; Rechtshaid; Sophie Xeon; Maraj	3:21
14.	"Medellín" (Offer Nissim Madame X in the Sphinx Mix; with Maluma)	Madonna; Edgar Barrera; Ahmadzaï; Juan Londono	5:28
15.	"I Rise" (Tracy Young's Pride Intro Radio Remix)	Madonna; Brittany Hazzard; Evigan	3:50
16.	"Crave" (Tracy Young Dangerous Remix; featuring Swae Lee)	Madonna; Hazzard; Mike Dean; Khalif Brown	4:46
17.	"I Don't Search I Find" (Honey Dijon Radio Mix)	Madonna; Ahmadzaï	5:22
Total length:			78:04

Finally Enough Love track listing
No.	Title	Length
1.	"Everybody" (You Can Dance Remix Edit)	4:34
2.	"Into the Groove" (You Can Dance Remix Edit)	4:44
3.	"Like a Prayer" (7" Remix / Edit)	5:42
4.	"Express Yourself" (Remix / Edit)	4:59
5.	"Vogue" (Single Version)	4:20
6.	"Deeper and Deeper" (David's Radio Edit)	4:02
7.	"Secret" (Junior's Luscious Single Mix)	4:15
8.	"Frozen" (Extended Club Mix Edit)	4:36
9.	"Music" (Deep Dish Dot Com Radio Edit)	4:11
10.	"Hollywood" (Calderone & Quayle Edit)	3:59
11.	"Hung Up" (SDP Extended Vocal Edit)	4:56
12.	"Give It 2 Me" (Eddie Amador Club 5 Edit)	4:55
13.	"Girl Gone Wild" (Avicii's UMF Mix)	5:14
14.	"Living for Love" (Offer Nissim Promo Mix)	5:52
15.	"Medellín" (Offer Nissim Madame X in the Sphinx Mix; with Maluma)	5:28
16.	"I Don't Search I Find" (Honey Dijon Radio Mix)	5:22
Total length:		77:09

== Personnel ==
- Madonna – compilation producer
- Mike Dean – remastering
- Johann Delebarre – creative director
- Aldo Diaz – 50-track edition cover artwork
- Ricardo Gomes – 16-track edition cover art photographer
- Gary Heery – 50-track edition cover art photographer
- Brendon Shay – 16-track edition cover artwork
- Sean Solymar – mastering assistant

== Charts ==
=== Weekly charts ===
Weekly chart performance
Chart (2022)	Peak position
Australian Albums (ARIA)	1
Austrian Albums (Ö3 Austria)	7
Belgian Albums (Ultratop Flanders)	1
Belgian Albums (Ultratop Wallonia)	1
Canadian Albums (Billboard)	7
Czech Albums (ČNS IFPI)	13
Croatian International Albums (HDU)	1
Danish Vinyl (Hitlisten)	2
Dutch Albums (Album Top 100)	1
Finnish Albums (Suomen virallinen lista)	18
French Albums (SNEP)	2
German Albums (Offizielle Top 100)	2
Greek Albums (IFPI)	39
Hungarian Albums (MAHASZ)	3
Irish Albums (Official Charts)	2
Italian Albums (FIMI)	2
Japanese Albums (Oricon)	22
Japanese Hot Albums (Billboard Japan)	25
New Zealand Albums (RMNZ)	39
Polish Albums (ZPAV)	9
Portuguese Albums (AFP)	1
Scottish Albums (Official Charts)	2
Slovak Albums (ČNS IFPI)	89
Spanish Albums (Promusicae)	2
Swedish Albums (Sverigetopplistan)	37
Swiss Albums (Schweizer Hitparade)	2
UK Albums (Official Charts)	3
US Billboard 200	8
US Top Dance Albums (Billboard)	1

=== Monthly charts ===
Monthly chart performance
Chart (2022)	Position
Croatian Vinyl Albums (HDU)	1
German Vinyl Albums (Offizielle Top 100)	4

=== Year-end charts ===
2022 year-end chart performance
Chart (2022)	Position
Australian Dance Albums (ARIA)	16
Belgian Albums (Ultratop Wallonia)	199
Hungarian Albums (MAHASZ)	79
Spanish Vinyl Albums (PROMUSICAE)	34

2023 year-end chart performance
Chart (2023)	Position
UK Albums (OCC)	86

== Certifications and sales ==
Certifications and sales
Region	Certification	Certified units/sales
New Zealand (RMNZ)	Gold	7,500^{‡}
United Kingdom (BPI)	Platinum	361,432
^{‡} Sales+streaming figures based on certification alone.

== Release history ==
Release dates and formats
Country	Date	Edition	Format	Label
Various	June 24, 2022	16-track edition	Streaming (pre-release)	Warner
Various	August 19, 2022	16-track edition	CD; 2-LP; digital download	Warner
Various	August 19, 2022	50-track edition	3-CD; 6-LP; digital download; streaming	Warner

== See also ==
- Artists with the most number-ones on the U.S. Dance Club Songs chart
- List of number-one albums of 2022 (Australia)
- List of number-one albums of 2022 (Belgium)
- List of number-one albums of 2022 (Portugal)
- List of Billboard number-one electronic albums of 2022
