= Madame X (album) =

2019 album by Madonna

- Standard edition cover

Studio album by Madonna
- Released: June 14, 2019
- Recorded: 2018–2019
- Studios: Lisbon; London; Los Angeles; New York
- Genres: Latin; trap; art pop; world
- Length: 56:01
- Languages: English; Portuguese; Spanish
- Label: Interscope
- Producers: Madonna; Mirwais; Mike Dean; Diplo; Picard Brothers; Billboard; Jason Evigan; Jeff Bhasker; Pharrell Williams

Madonna chronology
Rebel Heart Tour (2017)	Madame X (2019)	Madame X: Music from the Theater Xperience (2021)

Alternative cover
- Deluxe edition cover

Singles from Madame X
- 1. "Medellín" Released: April 17, 2019; 2. "Crave" Released: May 10, 2019; 3. "I Rise" Released: October 4, 2019; 4. "I Don't Search I Find" Released: May 22, 2020

Madame X is the fourteenth studio album by American singer and songwriter Madonna. It was released on June 14, 2019, under Interscope Records, as Madonna's final album with the label, before returning to Warner Records in 2022. The record was creatively influenced by her expatriate life in Lisbon, Portugal, after Madonna relocated there in mid-2017 to put her son David Banda into a top football academy. Madonna co-wrote and co-produced the album with a number of musicians, including Mirwais, Mike Dean, Diplo, the Picard Brothers and Jason Evigan, during a process that lasted 18 months. Madame X also features guest appearances by artists Anitta, Maluma, Quavo and Swae Lee.

Madame X is a concept album which represents a musical and lyrical departure from Madonna's previous releases, focusing on Latin, trap, art pop and world music. It deals with political themes including sexism, gun control, freedom of speech, racism and gay rights, similar to her ninth studio album American Life (2003). Four singles were released: "Medellín", "Crave", "I Rise" and "I Don't Search I Find". The songs "Dark Ballet" and "Future" were released as promotional singles to raise interest in the album. To further promote Madame X, Madonna performed on television shows such as the 2019 Billboard Music Awards, at which augmented reality was incorporated into the performance. She also embarked on the Madame X Tour: an all-theatre tour which visited North America and Europe, from September 2019 to March 2020, and was chronicled by Madonna in her documentary film Madame X (2021).

Madame X received generally positive reviews from critics. Many of them complimented the progressive sound in comparison to her previous efforts, deeming the album "bizarre" and "patchwork", yet calling it her best since 2005's Confessions on a Dance Floor. Madame X topped the album charts in Argentina, Portugal and the United States while reaching number two in Australia, Belgium, Canada, Italy, Mexico, the Netherlands, Switzerland and the United Kingdom. It has also been certified gold in Italy and Poland. By the end of 2020, the album had sold over 500,000 copies worldwide.

== Background and development ==
In August 2017, Madonna relocated to Lisbon after seeking a top football academy for her son David Banda, who wanted to become a professional association football player. She later stated that she had options of top academies in Turin and Barcelona, but Lisbon seemed the best choice for herself and her family. While she thought the move was going to be "fun and adventurous", she soon realized that she was not suited to the lifestyle change, and felt depressed without local friends. She began meeting artists, such as painters and musicians, who would invite her to their "living room sessions". In the sessions, they would bring food and sit around the table, and musicians would start playing instruments, singing Fado and samba music.

One of the first musicians Madonna met in Lisbon was Dino D'Santiago, who she called her "musical plug"; he taught her to speak and sing Portuguese, and also to sing in D'Santiago's native Cape Verdean Creole. He also introduced the singer to a number of musicians in the area, including some who ended up being featured on the album. Believing "music is the soul of the universe", she felt connected to her new influences, so she decided to record an album based on her musical experience in the country, which she referred to be "a melting pot of culture".

== Writing and recording sessions ==
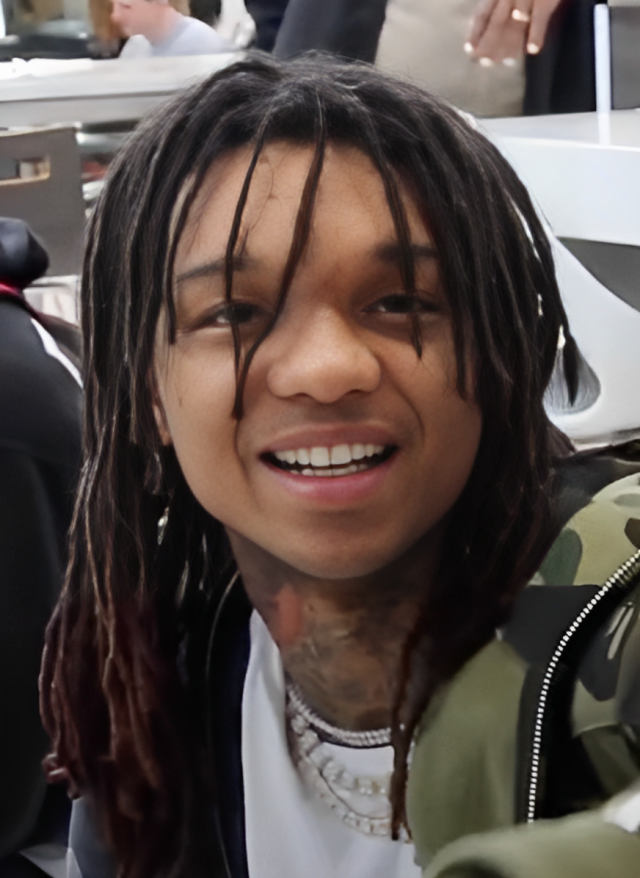
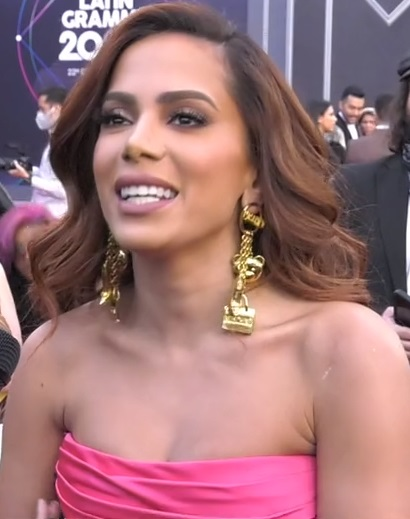
Two of the featured artists on the album were Swae Lee (left) and Anitta (right).

In January 2018, Madonna announced on her Instagram account that she had begun work on her fourteenth studio album, posting a shot of herself singing into a microphone with the caption: "Feels so good to be working on music again!". When Madonna moved to Lisbon, she was in the process of writing a script for a film, and was trying to raise money with investors, but the project fell through. She decided to use her free time to make music, after being inspired by the living room sessions she had attended. Initially, the singer had no intention of recording an album, as she was "just playing around and experimenting", but then she realized she was "officially making a record". She disclosed that she had recorded her two previous albums—MDNA (2012) and Rebel Heart (2015)—reluctantly, as she was concentrating on parallel projects at the time, but this time she started recording as she "got bored". Madonna split her time between Lisbon, London, New York and Los Angeles to record the album, in a process which lasted over 18 months.

Inspired by the melancholy and the feeling of Portuguese music, Madonna turned to music producer Mirwais, who had previously co-produced three of her albums, Music (2000), American Life (2003) and Confessions on a Dance Floor (2005). She sent him demos, as she wanted to make the music her own and make it sound more modern. Mirwais sent his ideas back to Madonna a few days later; she recalled that he had added elements such a Roland TR-808, and "turned it into something amazing". The singer also explained that she wanted to work with Mirwais again as they shared similar personalities and were interested in experimenting, and further disclosed that she likes the fact that "he breaks the rules and doesn't think or hear in a conventional way", and does not have any rules about how music should sound. She said that their similar minds make them start debates about everything that is going on in the world while in the studio, and it reflects in the politically oriented music. "Killers Who Are Partying" was the first song out of the six they wrote for the album, built around the sample of a guitar Madonna had recorded herself during a Fado session. During her promotion for Finally Enough Love: 50 Number Ones (2022) album, she retrospectively stated this was her favorite song.

"I've just met lots of really amazing musicians, and I've ended up working with a lot of these musicians on my new record, so Lisbon has influenced my music and my work. How could it not? I don't see how I could have gone through that year without being informed by all this input of culture. [...] [It is] a nice antidote to what's going on in the music business now where everything's so formulaic".

— Madonna discussing how Lisbon influenced Madame X.

Madonna revealed in January 2019 that she was working with the Cape Verdean drummer collective Batukadeiras Orchestra. The singer became interested in working with the collective after watching a "mesmerizing and hypnotizing" performance of theirs which she described as a "wild" experience. In the collaboration, Madonna would write down some words in the studio and encourage the Batukadeiras to "just repeat" after her. As they were not used to using microphones, the production team had to record things separately because Madonna was singing in 4/4 time, while the collective was playing in their txabeta triplet time. After being introduced by D'Santiago, Madonna became fascinated with the music of Guinea-Bissau native Kimi Djabaté. As both the Batukadeiras and Djabaté did not speak English, D'Santiago acted as a translator in the studio. Madonna sent them the other songs she had recorded for the album as she wanted to know if they sounded authentic.

"Crave" was one of the first songs Madonna wrote for Madame X with American musician Starrah, but the song was put on hold when she began working in Lisbon. Upon reviewing all the songs she had written, Madonna listened to the track again and thought a male voice was needed on it, and asked rapper and singer Swae Lee to sing "Crave" with her. In December 2018, singer Anitta shared a selfie with Madonna on her social media accounts, revealing that they were working together. Anitta was introduced to Madonna by photographer Mert Alas when she was looking to record a song in Brazilian Portuguese and pay tribute to her fans who are native from the country. Madonna said it felt very different than Portugal's Portuguese, so she had to relearn the language with the help of Anitta. Months later, in February 2019, singer Maluma posted a photo in the studio with Madonna; they had met backstage at the 2018 MTV Video Music Awards, and she decided to collaborate with Maluma after she learned of their mutual love of horses. While discussing her choice of artists to collaborate for the record, Madonna said that it happens instinctively and in an organic way.

== Title and artwork ==
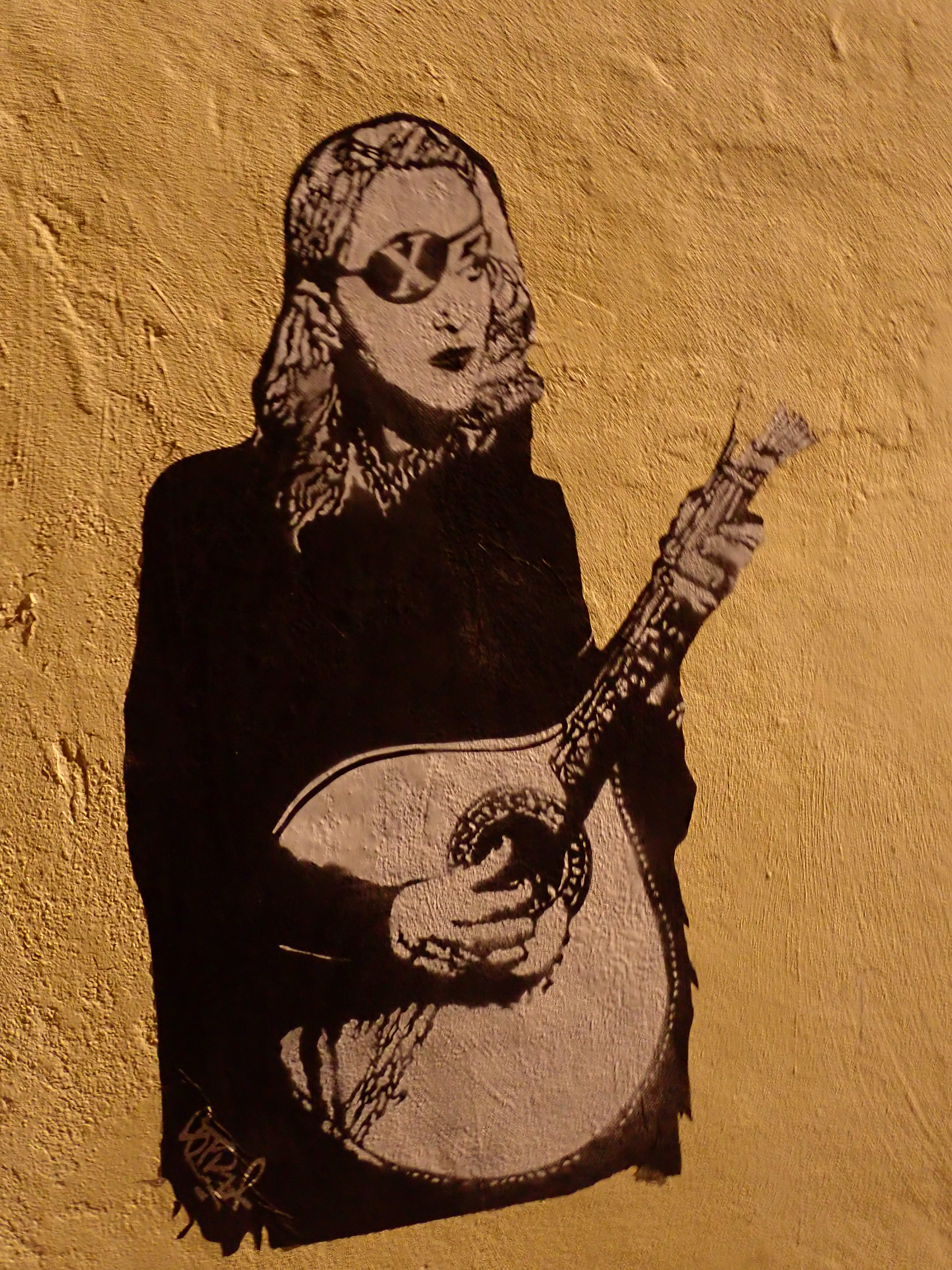
A graffiti in Lisbon depicting Madonna's alter-ego for the album

On April 15, 2019, a one-minute teaser was uploaded to Madonna's official social media accounts, in which she declares herself as Madame X, an alter-ego the album is named after, which is also the title of a 1908 play written by Alexandre Bisson, as well as an infamous 1884 portrait by artist John Singer Sargent. In the video, Madonna donned several costumes and identities while explaining the concept behind the album. The singer claimed she was given the moniker "Madame X" by her dance teacher Martha Graham at the age of 19, when the singer attended dance classes at her school. Madonna's refusal to comply with the school's strict dress code got her sent to Graham's office regularly, which led Graham to tell Madonna, "I'm going to give you a new name: Madame X. Every day, you come to school and I don't recognize you. Every day, you change your identity. You're a mystery to me." She shared the story with designer Jeremy Scott during a visit in Lisbon, and suggested that it could be the record's title, to which she agreed. In the teaser, Madonna gave further details concerning the album and her alter-ego, which features different personas and characters:

"I decided to call my record Madame X. Madame X is a secret agent. Traveling around the world. Changing identities. Fighting for freedom. Bringing light to dark places. She is a dancer. A professor. A head of state. A housekeeper. An equestrian. A prisoner. A student. A mother. A child. A teacher. A nun. A singer. A saint. A whore. A spy in the house of love. I am Madame X".

Madame X's album artworks were taken from a January 18, 2019 photoshoot with photographer Steven Klein in Lisbon, Portugal. The cover for the standard edition features Madonna wearing diamond art deco earrings by Pennisi Jewelry, with azeviche black hair, pale skin, arched eyebrows, thin smile and red lipstick. The album's title was etched across her lips to give the illusion of her mouth being sewn shut. Some journalists compared the imagery to that of Mexican painter Frida Kahlo (notably, Madonna's name is written between her eyebrows in a manner that evokes Kahlo's iconic unibrow), while a writer on The Art Newspaper noted that the artwork also referenced Russian performance artist Pyotr Pavlensky, who had previously sewed his mouth shut in a protest. In an interview with iHeartRadio's The Box, Madonna disclosed that she is representing her mother on the cover, Madonna Fortin, as the picture depicts what she looked like, and it meant a lot to her. Madonna's mother's lips were sewn shut when she died, which was previously depicted in the music video for "Oh Father" (1989). Mike Wass from Idolator called it an "already-iconic artwork". The cover for the deluxe edition features a platinum-blonde Madonna depicting a Soviet revolutionary, and was used on the digital deluxe and box set versions. For this alternative artwork, the singer seemed to "recreate the cover illustration of a 1910 novel adaptation by J.W. McConaughy", as noted by Paper's Michael Love Michael. A third album artwork features a brunette Madonna holding a guitar in front of a wall of blue tiles, and was used for the deluxe two-CD and box set releases. Another promotional picture for Madame X was shared by Madonna in her social media networks, depicting a nipple pierced by a single red rose, which she described as a "portrait of a lady"; it was criticized by the media. Attitude's Matthew Barton described the album's standard artwork and packaging as a "labour of love", and praised the deluxe box set as a "stroke of genius".

== Composition ==
=== Style and influences ===
"I feel that my record, because Lisbon is a melting pot of culture, from Angola to Spain to Brazil to France—I had the pleasure and honour to meet musicians from all these places and be inspired by their music and let it influence me. And that's how all these songs came to be".

— Madonna on Madame X's influences.

Madame X celebrates Madonna's career-long affair with Latin music and culture as well as other global influences. According to AllMusic and The Daily Telegraph, the record consists of three main genres: Latin, trap, and art pop. For Rich Juzwiak of Pitchfork, it further combines genres such as Fado, baile funk, and batuque, thus making a rendering of world music. The album offers a departure from her heavily EDM-influenced 21st-century work, seen on MDNA and Rebel Heart. Jonny Coleman from The Hollywood Reporter described Madame X as a "concept album in which Madonna assumes the role of Madame X", while Louise Bruton of The Irish Times noted that the singer "takes on numerous characters, and many, many accents, to create a wild and varied universe that's reflective of the general doom the world is swilling around in", with her being heavily disguised throughout, "pushing the sometimes manic concept of this album even further." Mirwais described the record as a "global futuristic album".

Madame X was noted to be Madonna's most linguistically diverse album, being sung in English, Spanish, and Portuguese. Influenced by her life in Lisbon, she sings in Portuguese in four tracks; the singer stated that she found important to sing in the local language, although she was not a fluent speaker. The singer attributed her decision of including various languages on the album as she considers herself a "citizen of the world", and further explained that people will always be connected through music in a primal way regardless of the language, considering it as "the one thing that keeps us connected, the one thing that lifts us up, [and] the one thing that give us hope". She also saw the use of other languages on Madame X as a love letter to multiculturalism: "Art belongs to everyone. It's not a question of appropriating what other people do and taking it as your own", resuming the record as an homage to all kinds of music that she had listened to while living in Portugal, and desiring to give a "platform and a voice to all of this incredible music that the rest of the world doesn't really have the privilege to hear and listen to." Madonna also agreed that her decision was a way to challenge the dominance of English in pop music, as she likes the idea of world music and hates compartmentalising music.

Lyrically, Madame X focuses mostly on political themes, such as sexism, gun control, freedom of speech, racism and gay rights, a contrast to her previous works, which were mostly about love and sex. Madonna revealed that the shift on her lyrical content was caused by her being afraid and frightened by "so many things that are going on in the world", but still maintaining an optimistic view for the future, being able to channel her anger and rage in order to create music "full of joy"; she also saw Madame X as a continuation of American Life for its political direction. She justified it as a result of her relationship with Mirwais, as they always "end up getting into thousands of philosophical discussions about everything that's going on in the world. So it just happens that us together is like a combustible, political, musical manifesto". Vulture's Craig Jenkins also considered it as a continuation of American Life, as it revisited and restructured some of its political ideas, becoming "an album about the ways the planet sucks right now and how that makes the artist feel". Paul Nolan from Hot Press also noted that there is a notable political dimension to Madame X, with Madonna "regularly alluding to the tumultuous times in which we live", with Michael Love Michael of Paper stating that she "simultaneously shares discoveries about her and others' humanity while parsing these themes out."

=== Music and lyrics ===
Musical diversity represented in Madame X
"Batuka"
"Batuka" features background vocals and drums played by the Batukadeiras Orchestra.

"I Don't Search I Find"
"I Don't Search I Find" takes influence from Madonna's past works, including "Vogue" (1990), Erotica (1992) and Confessions on a Dance Floor (2005).

Madame X opens with "Medellín", a duet with Maluma named after the city in Colombia where he was born, being written bilingually in English and Spanish. Described as a Latin pop track with elements of "classic" reggaeton and a "breezy" dance-pop sound, "Medellín" is centered around a "classic cha-cha-chá groove". It lyrically depicts a vulnerable Madonna on a mystical trip, singing about how "another me can now begin" and "for once doesn't have to hide herself". The following track, "Dark Ballet", is an experimental pop and electro-gospel piano ballad, with Madonna's vocals making use of a vocoder. The lyrical content address the singer's faith and "lifelong crusade against the patriarchal forces of religion, gender, and celebrity". Following a piano interlude, "Dark Ballet" morphs into a "sinister" and "mangled, glitching" fragment from The Nutcracker's Dance of the Reed Pipes, in which she sings in a heavily edited robotic voice, "I will not denounce the things that I have said / I will not renounce my faith in my sweet Lord". Third song "God Control" is an experimental pop, disco, hi-NRG and electropop number. Described as a "euphoric, densely layered samba-disco-gospel mash-up" with violins and a retro sound, it features gunshot sounds, vocodered vocals and a choir provided by the Tiffin Children's Chorus. Lyrically, "God Control" is a song about gun control, as well as democracy and politics of the United States.

The fourth track on Madame X is "Future", a duet with Quavo. It is a roots reggae, hip hop, and electro-ragga song, heavily influenced by dancehall. In the lyrics, Madonna declares that "not everyone can come into the future" in a "hopeful" tone about shedding any recent negativity, whereas Quavo raps while reflecting on his "gold life" and looking forward to what is to come. Following song "Batuka" is a batuque with influences of Afrobeat. It features background vocals and drums played by the Batukadeiras Orchestra, and is built on a call and response structure, with the group singing their own solos in the Cape Verdean Creole language. Its narrative is about overcoming adversity, while Madonna warns of "a storm ahead" over vocodered vocals. "Killers Who Are Partying" appears next, being described as a "lightly electro-dusted take on Portuguese Fado", accompanied by "fluttering, restrained guitars". The lyrics were inspired by the 1946 post-war poem "First they came…" by Martin Niemöller, and depict expressing solidarity to minorities: "I will be poor if the poor are humiliated / I will be Islam if Islam is hated", which was based on the fact that Madonna does not see the world in a fragmented way, but as a unity. Madonna also sings a few verses in Portuguese.

Following song "Crave" features guest vocals by Swae Lee, and is a midtempo pop-trap ballad which features acoustic guitar, hand-clap beat, and guest vocals by Swae Lee. The lyrics are about "desire and longing", and chasing after someone who is running away. It also presents influence from Fado and begins with Madonna singing "I'm tired of being far away from home, far from what can help, far from where it's safe", being a likely reference to the fact that the album was created while she was living in Lisbon. The eighth track on Madame X, "Crazy", is a string-plucked ballad introduced by an accordion solo. It lyrically portrays the singer as a woman madly in love who refuses to get consumed by her feelings. The song also features verses sung in Portuguese. Opening with strong beats and accelerated rhythm, the next song "Come Alive" pays homage to the music of North Africa, specifically that of the Gnawa tribe; it also contains kuduro influences, with the Tiffin Children's Chorus making another appearance. Described as a "celebration of resilience and individuality", Madonna lyrically reiterates her disinterest in fitting in, claiming "I can't react how you thought I'd react". Appearing on the deluxe editions of the album, "Extreme Occident" features elements of morna and Indian music, with Madonna once more being heard singing a few lines in Portuguese. Its subject matter centers around her travels around the world searching for her own identity: "I came from the Midwest / Then I went to the Far East / I tried to discover my own identity", while hinting at anguish that her deliberate reinventions were misconstrued as personal failings.

Next is "Faz Gostoso", a cover version of Brazilian-born Portuguese singer Blaya's signature hit. Influenced by the song's success in Portugal, Madonna decided that she wanted to cover the track for Madame X. Described musically as "somewhere between baile funk and Angolan kuduro", it features Madonna and guest artist Anitta singing in both English and Brazilian Portuguese. While it remained faithful to the original version, Madonna made a number of changes to the song, adding a carnivale breakdown and English lyrics. Lyrically, "Faz Gostoso" is about engaging in an extramarital affair. Twelfth track "Bitch I'm Loca" is a reggaeton and marks the second duet with Maluma on the record; it features Madonna singing most of her verses in Spanish, with only one verse in English. Its lyrical content deals with Maluma meeting her at a club and finding out that she is crazy with her love. A disco and EDM song, "I Don't Search I Find" contains a "chunky '90s house percussion" and "rumbling" bassline, that heavily draws influence from Madonna's own work with Shep Pettibone, namely "Vogue" (1990), Erotica (1992), and Confessions on a Dance Floor. Throughout the song, Madonna repeats the hook "finally, enough love" and, with a "wide-eyed and awestruck" tone, the phrase "I found you, I found a new view".

Another track present on deluxe editions of Madame X is "Looking for Mercy", a "beautiful and heartfelt" ballad whose introspective lyrics display a vulnerable Madonna "flawed by design" and asking for sympathy. "I Rise" follows, and is the last track on the standard and deluxe versions of the album. Described as a "powerful and uplifting anthem", it contains a spoken intro taken from the speech of social activist, advocate for gun control Emma González. The bonus disc of the deluxe two-CD release and the box set editions of the album feature three additional songs. Over an electropop production, "Funana" finds Madonna singing about idealizing a scenario of union while namechecking several late music icons, among them Aretha Franklin, Whitney Houston, Prince and George Michael in a "Vogue"-style memoriam. "Back That Up to the Beat" is a reworked version of a leaked demo from Rebel Heart. It features a radically different composition, filled with Arabic musical instruments and complex drums. The final track "Ciao Bella" features "playful and fun" production, and guest vocals by Kimi Djabaté.

== Release and promotion ==
In April 2019, a series of posts were shared on Madonna's social media networks teasing the album. Her team also used her Twitter to share cryptic messages depicting pictures of herself with apples using the hashtag "magic", which she had been using since 2018, with one captioned "a taste of things to come". On Madonna's Instagram account, a series of images were posted, and together showed a large red 'X' on a black background; her profile picture was changed to an image of red lips featuring a cane between Madonna's teeth. Will Stroude of Attitude speculated whether a retrospective or fashion project was on the works. A playlist using the "magic" hashtag was also created on Madonna's Spotify page including selected tracks from her catalog; the first letter of each of the songs in the playlist spelled out "Madame X". On April 15, she posted a series of teaser clips on her Instagram account, revealing Madame X as the album title. Matthew Barton, also from Attitude, complimented Madonna's marketing team for the announcement as they followed the traditional pre-release model, posting hints of the project to create a buzz between fans alike.

Madame X was released on June 14, 2019, by Interscope Records, on streaming platforms and digital download, as well as on CD, vinyl and cassette. Three editions were released from the album: a 13-track standard version, a 15-track deluxe version, and a deluxe box set including a CD containing three bonus tracks and a 32-page booklet, a double-sided poster, a 7-inch vinyl, a 13-track cassette and a tattoo sheet. A 23-minute documentary titled World of Madame X was released on June 29 on paid streaming service Amazon Prime. Directed by Nuno Xico, the short film breaks down the album production and the inspiration behind the music, as well as featuring sneak peaks of album photoshoot and behind the scenes of music videos. An exclusive Madame X radio channel was launched on Sirius XM Satellite Radio on July 1, 2019; it showcased music spanning her career, focusing on songs from Madame X and the background stories behind them. On January 13, 2023, the deluxe box set version including three bonus tracks was made available through streaming platforms. Madame X became Madonna's final album under her three-album contract with Interscope. Following Madonna's return to her original record label Warner Music Group in 2021, it was revealed that Madame X and her other two Interscope albums would be transferred to Warner's catalog in 2025.

=== Singles and other songs ===
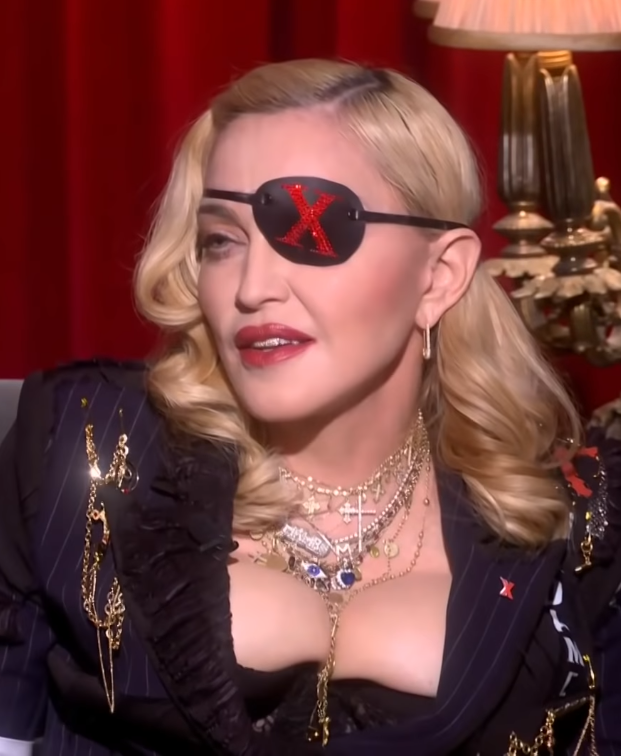
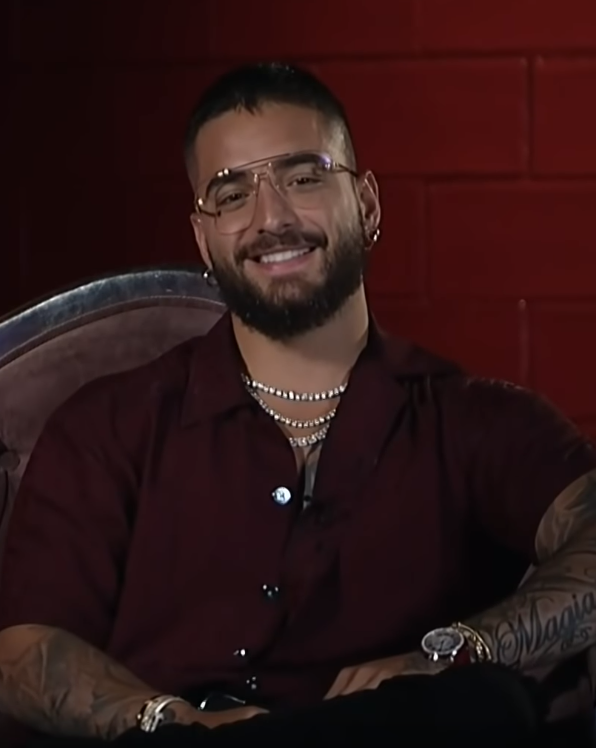
Madonna (left) and Maluma during the world premiere of the "Medellín" video at MTV's London studios.

The album's lead single, "Medellín", was released on April 17, 2019, coinciding with the album becoming available to pre-order. Its accompanying music video premiered on April 24, during a live MTV special broadcast simultaneously around the world. Spanish director Diana Kunst and multi-disciplinary artist Mau Morgó directed the video. "Medellín" reached the top 10 of the charts in several countries, including Colombia, Croatia, Hungary, Israel, and Venezuela. In the United States, the song charted at number 18 on the Hot Latin Songs and number one on the Hot Dance Club Songs. "Crave" was released as the second single on May 10, 2019. The music video, directed by Nuno Xico, featured Madonna and Swae Lee singing the track on New York City rooftops, surrounded by carrier pigeons. The song was her highest debut on the US Adult Contemporary chart, debuting at number 19 and eventually reaching number 11, becoming her best position on the chart since "Frozen" (1998), which reached number eight.

"I Rise" was sent to Italian radio stations on October 4, 2019, as the album's third single in the country, following a promotional release on May 3, 2019, Madonna partnered with Time Studios to create the music video for "I Rise", which was directed by Peter Matkiwsky and showed footage of Parkland shooting survivors, LGBTQ supporters, women's rights protesters, as well as other social justice movements. Remixes produced by Tracy Young were commercially released in July 2019. The fourth single, "I Don't Search I Find", was released as two EPs, featuring remixes by various collaborators. It also was released for airplay in Italy on May 22, 2020. The song became Madonna's record-breaking 50th number-one single on the Dance Club Songs chart. With this feat, she became the first artist to achieve this on any Billboard chart, bringing her longevity into five decades.

In the lead up to the release of Madame X, "I Rise", "Future" and "Dark Ballet" were released as promotional singles. "Dark Ballet" received a video directed by Emmanuel Adjei and stars a Joan of Arc–inspired story-line featuring Mykki Blanco, in which several heads of the church arrest and execute her by burning her at the stake. During the video, Blanco is shown wearing a gold corset reminiscent of Madonna's iconic conical bra. A Jonas Åkerlund–directed music video for "God Control" was also released on June 26, 2019. The video depicts a shooting scene in a nightclub that resembles the 2016 Orlando nightclub shooting, and contains a call to action in favor of gun control. "Batuka" received a music video which premiered on July 19, 2019, also directed by Adjei. It revolves around Madonna and the Batukadeiras Orchestra dancing and playing batuque, showing a series of portraits of their faces while they sing, and standing on a clifftop. In addition, "Faz Gostoso" peaked at number 53 in Portugal, and number 47 on the monthly streaming chart published by Pro-Música Brasil. On July 9, 2024 the song became Madonna's first song in Brazil to be certified Diamond.

=== Live appearances ===
Madonna first performed "Dark Ballet", known then as "Beautiful Game", at the 2018 Met Gala. After singing "Like a Prayer" (1989) and a cover of Leonard Cohen's "Hallelujah" (1984), she began singing the song wearing a corset and a metallic arm accessory, her hair braided and parted down the center; several dancers, wearing similar costumes, performed a choreography that seemed to control and restrain her movements. On April 19, 2019, "Medellín" was performed by Madonna and Maluma at the Billboard Music Awards; the number featured four virtual versions of her Madame X alter ego—a secret agent, a musician, a cha-cha instructor and a bride. Elements also present included a garden, rain and bursting blasts of color, provided by augmented reality, marking the first time it was used on American television. During the performance, the singers recreated scenes from the song's music video, including Maluma removing a garter from Madonna's thigh; afterwards, the song rose by 261% in streams to 2,200,000, increasing from 596,000. Andrew Unterberger of Billboard ranked it as the second best performance of the night, calling it "memorable" and saying it was "good to see that the pop legend certainly hasn't lost her ability to surprise and delight".

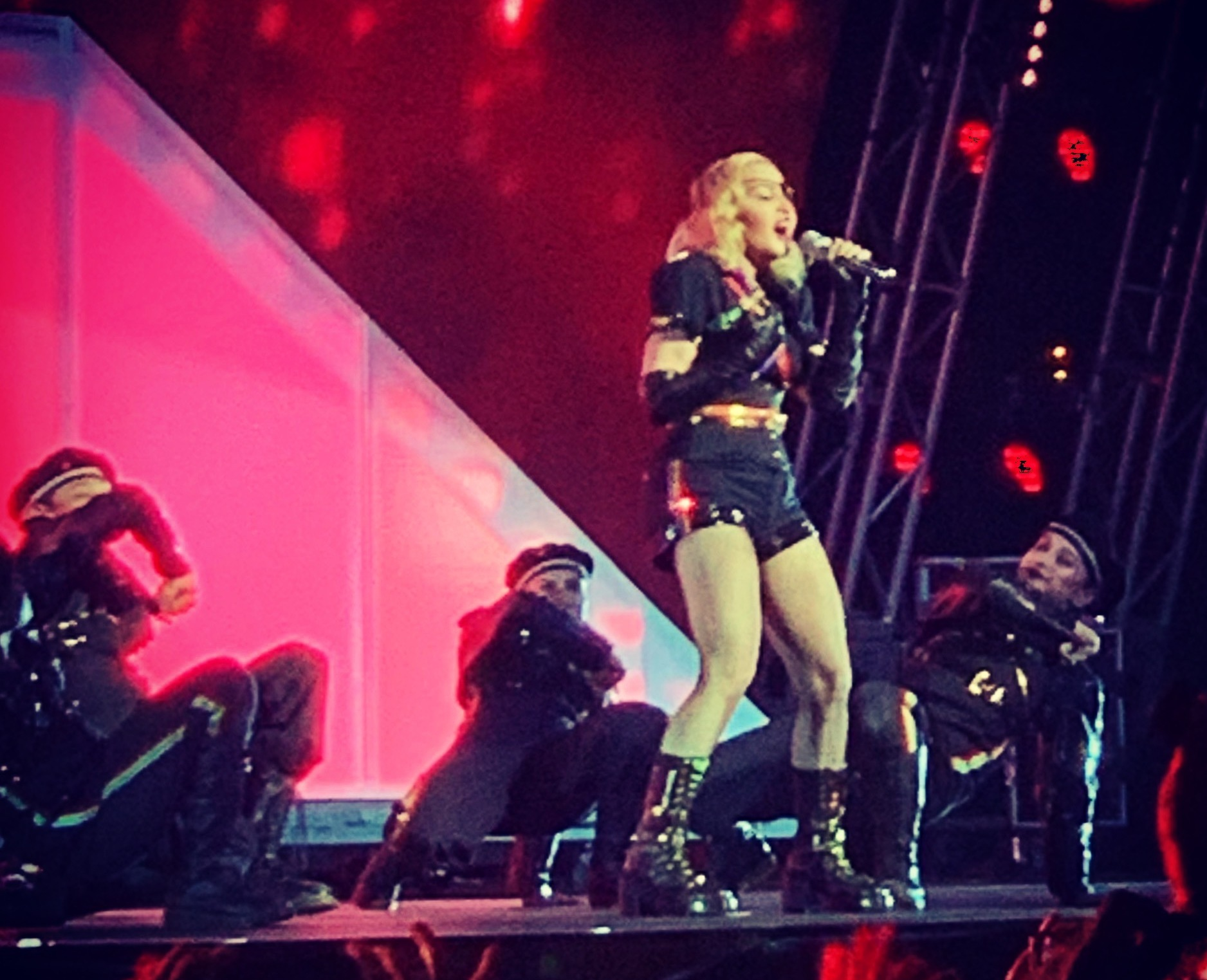
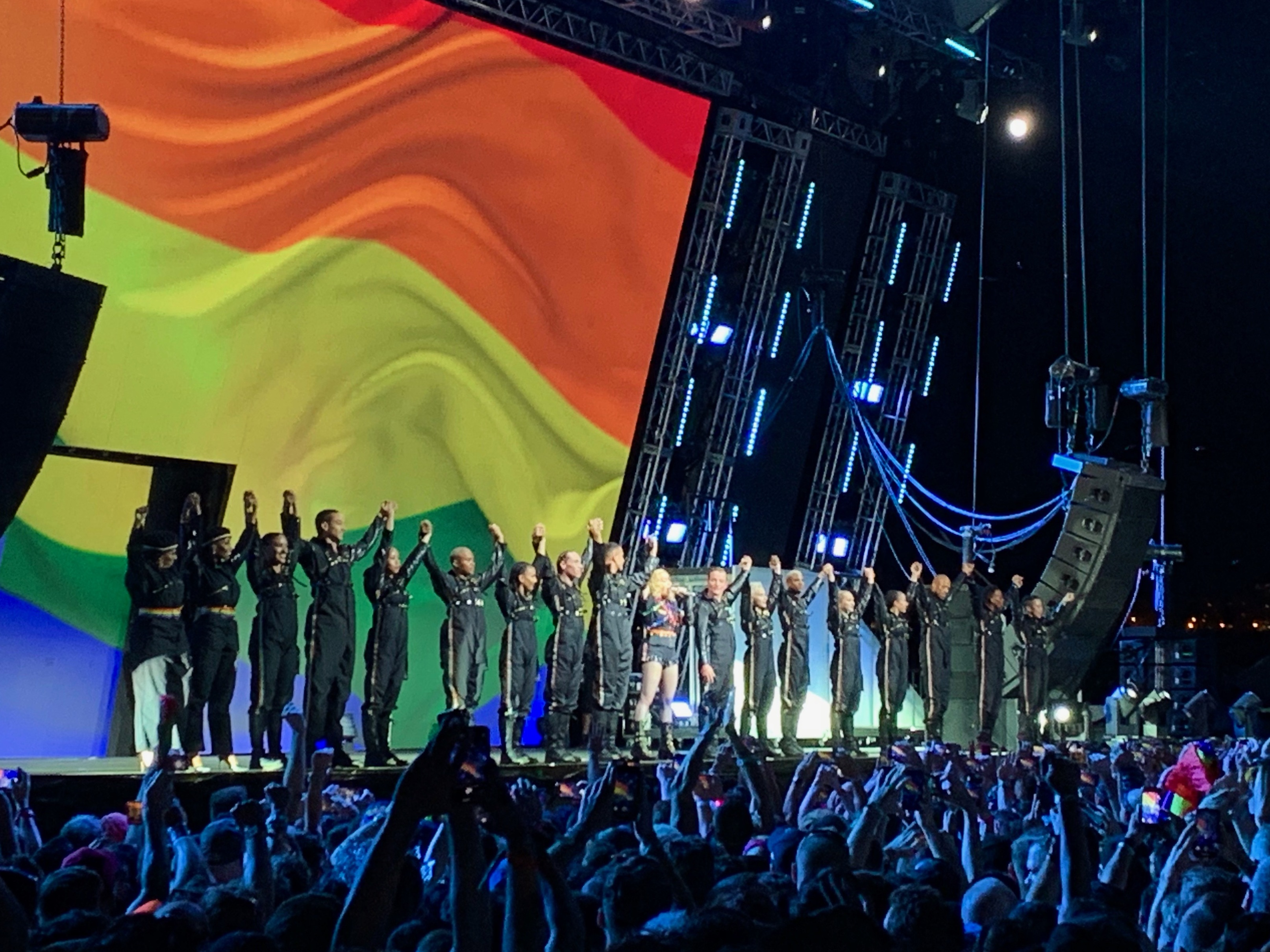
Madonna performing "God Control" (left) and "I Rise" (right) during her set at Stonewall 50 – WorldPride NYC 2019

On May 16, it was confirmed that Madonna would perform at the Eurovision Song Contest 2019 finale. The artist was joined by Quavo, and sang "Future" and "Like a Prayer"; she wore a black cape and eyepatch, while several dancers in gas masks fell to the ground. Also featured were two dancers with Palestinian and Israeli flags on their backs holding each other. The performance caused controversy, as it was seen as a political statement for the Israeli–Palestinian conflict. Eurovision organizers said that that particular part of the number was not an approved part of the act; the European Broadcasting Union released a statement saying Eurovision was a non-political event and that Madonna had been made aware. The Palestinian Campaign for the Academic and Cultural Boycott of Israel (PACBI), along with other artists such as Roger Waters and Brian Eno, had previously called for a boycott of the Eurovision Song Contest in support of Palestine, and even urged Madonna not to perform. Madonna said that she was never going to "stop playing music to suit someone's political agenda", to which the PACBI responded; "artwashing Israel's brutal oppression of Palestinians for a million dollars must be among the most immoral political agendas". Later, the Kan Israel Broadcasting Corporation sued Live Nation over the performance, claiming the singer's representatives had violated the terms of their agreement and "reneged on financial promises".

On July 1, 2019, Madonna gave a performance on Stonewall 50 – WorldPride NYC 2019 at Pier 97, Hudson River Park, New York City, and sang album track "God Control", "I Rise", "Vogue", and "American Life" (2003); she wore an eye-patch with an X designed in the colors of the rainbow flag, while her background dancers were decked as police officers wielding combat shields. After the performance, fireworks exploded over the venue. She also expressed her gratitude to the LGBT community at the show for supporting her during her career.

=== Tour ===
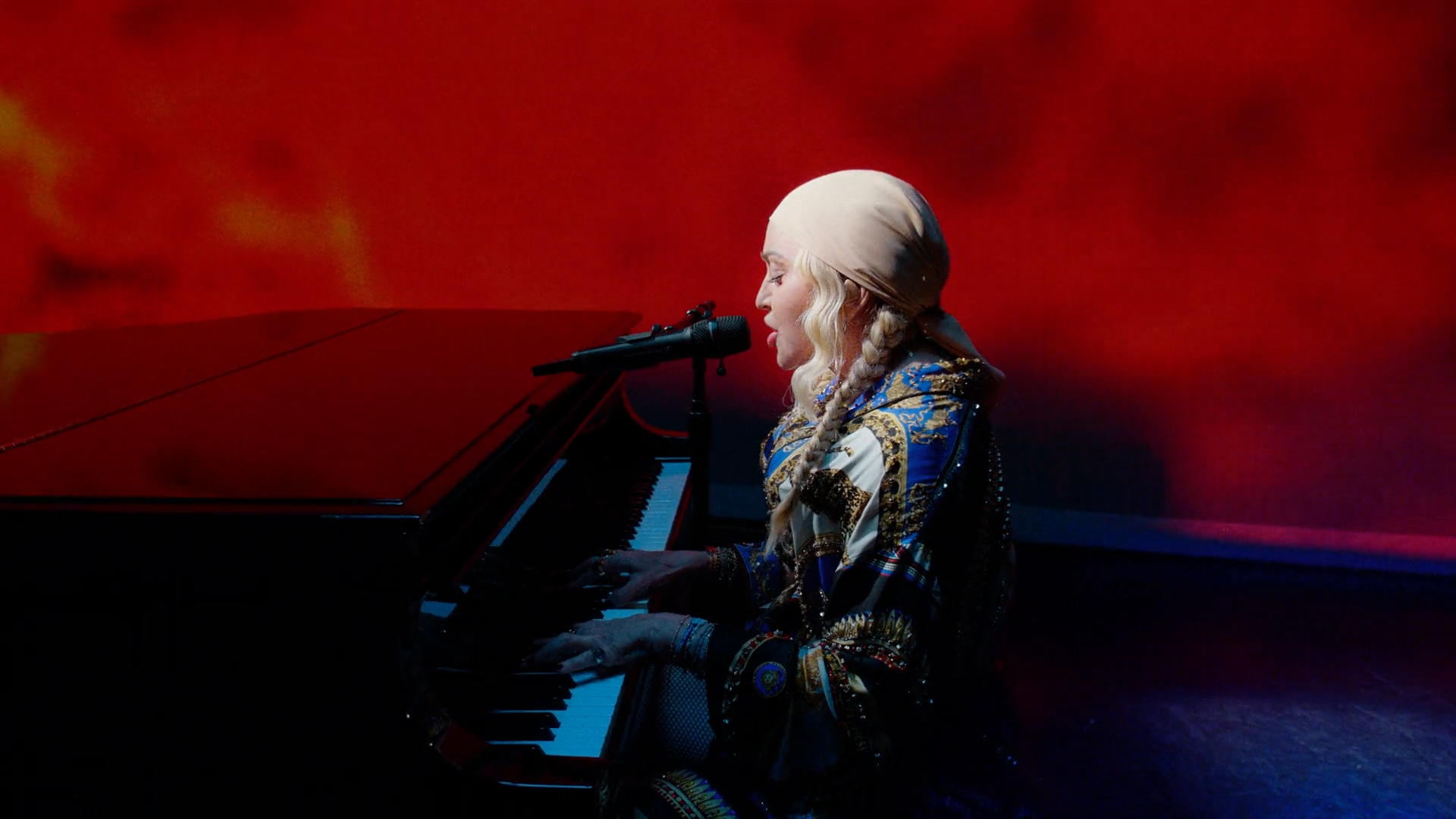
Madonna performing promotional single "Future" on one of the concerts of the Madame X Tour

Previous to the album's release, the singer had expressed the possibility of going on tour during a backstage interview at the Billboard Music Awards. Madonna had previously shown interest in doing a smaller-scale show during an interview with BBC News. Titled Madame X Tour, it was officially announced by the singer on May 6 through her official Twitter account. It kicked off on September 17, 2019, at New York City's BAM Howard Gilman Opera House, and ended on March 8, 2020, at Paris' Grand Rex. It marked the first time Madonna played theaters and small venues since the Virgin Tour in 1985.

The tour received generally positive reviews from critics, although the lack of Madonna's earliest hit songs and the inclusion of Madame X album cuts received some criticism. Controversy arose due to Madonna's late show starts, with a fan going as far as to file a class action lawsuit against her. At the 2020 Billboard year-end boxscore charts, it was reported that the tour had grossed over $36,385,935 from an audience of 124,655. After several cancellations due to a recurring knee injury, the tour ended abruptly three days before its planned final date, after the French government announced a ban on gatherings of more than 1,000 people to curb the spread of COVID-19 in the midst of the pandemic. A concert film also titled Madame X was released by Madonna on October 8, 2021, to be streamed on Paramount+. A live album titled Madame X: Music from the Theater Xperience was released on October 8, 2021 exclusively on streaming platforms. A vinyl edition with new tracks was released in 2023.

== Critical reception ==
Professional ratings
Aggregate scores
Source	Rating
AnyDecentMusic?	6.9/10
Metacritic	70/100
Review scores
Source	Rating
AllMusic	4/5 stars
And It Don't Stop	A−
The Daily Telegraph	3/5 stars
The Guardian	4/5 stars
NME	4/5 stars
Pitchfork	4.8/10
Q	4/5 stars
Rolling Stone	3/5 stars
Slant Magazine	4/5 stars
The Times	4/5 stars

Madame X was met with generally positive reviews. At Metacritic, which assigns a normalized rating out of 100 to reviews from mainstream publications, the album received an average score of 70, based on 21 reviews. Aggregator AnyDecentMusic? gave the album 6.9 out of 10, based on their assessment of the critical consensus. Stephen Thomas Erlewine from AllMusic commented that Madame X "amply rewards such close listening", complimenting its "daring embrace of the world outside the U.S." Kitty Empire of The Observer hailed it as being a "splendidly bizarre return to form" for Madonna, describing the production as "fluid... but one tempered by Madonna's solid confidence in her own aesthetic decisions". Similarly, Nick Smith of MusicOMH praised the album, calling it "bold, bizarre, brazen and beguiling", while Hot Press's Paul Nolan summarized the album as a "wonderfully accomplished and eclectic effort." Q's writer Victoria Segal stated that, "this is Madonna on top of the world, looking down on creation, God complex at cruising altitude." From The National, Saeed Saeed said Madame X is a "vibrant and esoteric album" that will "get better with age".

In his "Consumer Guide" column at And It Don't Stop, Robert Christgau viewed Madame X as an indication that Madonna remains a "colorful" professional who releases solid records, even the songs "about forswearing dope and feeling the oppressed … well-intended ideas executed with the appropriate brio and calm, respectively". Will Hodgkinson of The Times called Madame X "probably her boldest, certainly her strangest, album yet", and "much of the music is downbeat, albeit with orchestras and choirs adding lush expansiveness", resulting in Madonna's most intriguing album in a decade. El Hunt from NME noted that the album brought a glint in Madonna's eye for the first time since Confessions on a Dance Floor, complimenting its "restless" sound as it "doesn't imitate current pop trends as much as it mangles them into new shapes". Similarly, City Pages' Alfred Soto shared a similar sentiment, as he thought it was Madonna's most satisfying work since Confessions on a Dance Floor, as it was "ambitious in its muddle, versatile by design, a product of an incubation both fruitful and debilitating for a pop polymath". Saeed Saaed concluded that, "while not all of the experimentation works, the fact she remains stretching herself, creatively, is reassuring".

Slant Magazine's Sal Cinquemani stated that the album's "pervasive" vocal effects have a distancing effect, but affirmed that "even when Madonna falters, at least you know you're getting the real deal and not some version of a pop icon cooked up in a songwriting lab." The Independent journalist Alexandra Pollard classified Madame X as "a cultural melange that it sometimes verges on collapsing in on itself", noting that at other times "what is thrown at the wall sticks beautifully". Ben Beaumont-Thomas of The Guardian called it "her most natural-feeling, progressive and original record" since Confessions on a Dance Floor. However, he also stated that the album was one of her "most bizarre and sprawling, and features some of her worst ever music". Similarly, Jeremy Helligar from Variety noted that Madonna is "passionate and satisfyingly unconcerned with mass consumption" on her best album since Confessions on a Dance Floor, calling it "her most uncompromising musical statement yet", despite some "lyrical missteps". Writing for the Evening Standard, El Hunt also had the same opinion, referring to Madame X as the singer's "weirdest" yet best album since Confessions on a Dance Floor, despite sounding like a "complete nightmare in certain places". Metro Weekly's Sean Maunier deemed the album's tone as "bleak", as it moves "erratically between styles and genres, sometimes all in the very same song", although it delivers "some of the most strange, outlandish and purely self-indulgent work she has ever produced".

Rob Sheffield of Rolling Stone described the record as being "admirably bizarre", but remarked that its "strongest songs" were buried beneath "disasters". Neil McCormick of The Daily Telegraph summarized Madame X as being "a mad mishmash of an album", and criticized its lack of cohesiveness, stating that Madonna was "fighting on too many fronts at the same time". Mark Kennedy from the Associated Press called it a "needy, trying-too-hard mess of an album that sounds like Madonna threw up on Madonna". CJ Thorpe-Tracey, writing for The Quietus, noted its "shallow and contrived" sound, and "as Madame X unfolds I'm not charmed; I'm more and more irritated and, later on, just tired". Rich Juzwiak from Pitchfork denounced the album as being "muddled and convoluted", calling it "lyrically inarticulate", while Jonny Coleman from The Hollywood Reporter classified it a "mess" while representing Madonna "trying to meld the sounds of Lisbon, Portugal", containing some of the "stupidest lyrics you're likely to hear this year".

=== Year-end lists ===
Critics' rankings for Madame X
Critic/Publication	List	Rank	Ref.
AllMusic	Favorite pop albums of 2019	Placed	
Billboard	The 50 Best Albums of 2019	46	
Billboard	Top 10 Fan-Favorite 2019 Albums	1	
Good Morning America	50 of The Best Albums of 2019	49	
Idolator	The 20 Best Pop Albums of 2019	9	
Jenesaispop	The 50 Best Albums of 2019	17	
Mojo	75 Best Albums of 2019	67	
NME	50 Best Albums of 2019	45	
Pazz & Jop	2019: Dean's List	63	
Slant Magazine	The 25 Best Albums of 2019	12	
The Yorkshire Times	Top 60 Albums of 2019	60	

== Commercial performance ==
Madame X debuted at number one on the US Billboard 200 chart with 95,000 album-equivalent units. 90,000 of which were pure album sales, while 4,000 were provided by streaming and 1,000 through individual track sales. It became Madonna's ninth number-one album in the United States — her first since MDNA — and her 22nd top 10 album, becoming the second female artist with most entries at number one at the time, behind Barbra Streisand. The album's sales were aided by her tour audience, who had an option to receive the release as part of their ticket purchase, as well as merchandise sold via her official website. The release also saw Madonna topping the Billboard Artist 100 chart for the first time since its launch in 2014, and was the fourth female artist to reach number one in 2019. Madame X dropped out of that chart on its third week, becoming the shortest run for a Madonna studio album on the chart. As of December 2019, the album has sold 169,000 copies in the US according to Alpha Data.

In the United Kingdom, it entered the UK Albums Chart at number two, selling 27,227 copies in its first week. It spent a total of five weeks in the chart before dropping off the top 100, and received a silver certification by the British Phonographic Industry (BPI), selling 62,000 copies in the region. The album was more successful with the cassette format in the UK, ranked seventh for the period 2010 to mid 2019. The album also debuted at number two in a number of European countries, including Belgium, Italy, the Netherlands and Switzerland. In France, it debuted at number four on the official album chart with 15,900 traditional units, while entering the Sales Albums Chart at number three. It has sold 29,000 copies in the country as of December 2019. In Germany, Madame X debuted at number five, becoming Madonna's lowest charting studio album since Erotica, which reached the same position.

In Canada, Madame X debuted at number two on the Canadian Albums Chart, behind Billie Eilish's When We All Fall Asleep, Where Do We Go?; however, Madonna's album had the highest pure album sales for the week. In Australia, Madame X became Madonna's 20th top 10 album in the country, entering at number two, but topped the digital albums and vinyl charts in the country. In New Zealand, commercial results were lower, with the album entering at number five. In Japan, Madame X entered the Oricon official charts at number 11, and reached number two on the international charts. On the Billboard Japan album charts, the album peaked at number 18. The record topped the albums chart in Argentina, while in Mexico, Madame X debuted at number two, behind María José's Conexión. In Uruguay, the record became the eighth best-selling album in June 2019 according to Cámara Uruguaya de Productores de Fonogramas (CUD). Madame X has sold 500,000 copies worldwide.

== Track listing ==
Standard edition
No.	Title	Writer(s)	Producer(s)	Length
1.	"Medellín" (with Maluma)	Madonna Ciccone; Mirwais Ahmadzaï; Juan Luis Londoño; Édgar Barrera	Madonna; Mirwais	4:58
2.	"Dark Ballet"	Ciccone; Ahmadzaï	Madonna; Mirwais	4:14
3.	"God Control"	Ciccone; Ahmadzaï; Casey Spooner	Madonna; Mirwais; Mike Dean	6:19
4.	"Future" (with Quavo^{[b]})	Ciccone; Thomas Pentz; Brittany Hazzard; Clément Picard; Maxine Picard; Quavious Marshall	Madonna; Diplo; Picard Brothers	3:53
5.	"Batuka"	Ciccone; David Banda; Ahmadzaï	Madonna; Mirwais	4:57
6.	"Killers Who Are Partying"	Ciccone; Ahmadzaï	Madonna; Mirwais	5:28
7.	"Crave" (with Swae Lee^{[b]})	Ciccone; Khalif Brown; Hazzard; Dean	Madonna; Dean; Billboard	3:21
8.	"Crazy"	Ciccone; Jason Evigan; Hazzard; Dean	Madonna; Dean; Evigan; Jeff Bhasker	4:02
9.	"Come Alive"	Ciccone; Bhasker; Hazzard; Dean	Madonna; Bhasker; Dean	4:02
10.	"Faz Gostoso" (featuring Anitta)	Rodrigo Carmo; Duarte Nuno; Emanuel Oliveira; Mateus Seabra; Luíz Vieira; Karla Rodrigues; Ciccone	Madonna; Dean; Billboard	4:05
11.	"Bitch I'm Loca" (featuring Maluma)	Ciccone; Lauren D'Elia; Londoño; Barrera; George James; Marvin Rodriguez; Stiven Rojas	Madonna; Billboard; Sunamy^{[a]}	2:50
12.	"I Don't Search I Find"	Ciccone; Ahmadzaï	Madonna; Mirwais	4:08
13.	"I Rise"	Ciccone; Evigan; Hazzard	Madonna; Evigan; Bhasker	3:44
Total length:				56:01

Deluxe edition
No.	Title	Writer(s)	Producer(s)	Length
10.	"Extreme Occident"	Ciccone; Ahmadzaï	Madonna; Mirwais	3:41
14.	"Looking for Mercy"	Ciccone; Hazzard; Bhasker	Madonna; Dean; Bhasker	4:50
16.	"Funana"	Ciccone; Ahmadzaï	Madonna; Mirwais	3:42
17.	"Back That Up to the Beat"	Ciccone; Hazzard; Pharrell Williams	Madonna; Bhasker; Dean; Williams	3:50
18.	"Ciao Bella" (featuring Kimi Djabaté^{[c]})	Ciccone; Ahmadzaï	Madonna; Mirwais	5:36
Total length:				77:40

=== Notes ===
- ^{^[a]} signifies a co-producer
- ^{^[b]} On the 2-CD editions, Quavo and Swae Lee are credited as featured artists instead of co-lead ones on "Future" and "Crave", respectively.
- ^{^[c]} Kimi Djabaté is listed as a featured artist only on the digital version of the album; on the 2-CD editions he remains uncredited.
- "Dark Ballet" contains a sample of "The Nutcracker Suite: Dance of the Reed-Flutes", composed by Pyotr Ilyich Tchaikovsky.
- "Faz Gostoso" is a cover of a song originally performed by Portuguese singer Blaya.
- Deluxe edition tracks are inserted into the existing track sequence, advancing all subsequent entries by one position without omitting any original songs.
- 15-track deluxe edition was released on digital platforms, on vinyl, and as an exclusive CD on Target, Fnac and HMV.
- Tracks 16, 17 and 18 were initially available exclusively on the international deluxe 2-CD edition bonus disc and were released digitally for the first time on January 13, 2023 worldwide.
- Deluxe box set edition includes the deluxe two-CD edition, the 7-inch vinyl single, and the 13-track cassette.
- Japanese edition includes the Offer Nissim Madame X in the Sphinx remix of "Medellín".

== Personnel ==
Personnel adapted from the liner notes of Madame X.

- Madonna – main vocals, songwriter, producer
- Mirwais – songwriter, producer
- Mike Dean – producer
- Diplo – songwriter, producer
- Clément Picard – songwriter, producer
- Maxime Picard – songwriter, producer
- Billboard – producer
- Jason Evigan – songwriter, producer
- Jeff Bhasker – producer
- Pharrell Williams – producer
- Starrah – songwriter
- Casey Spooner – songwriter
- David Banda – songwriter
- Lauren D'Elia – songwriter
- Anitta – featured artist
- The Batukadeiras Orchestra – background vocals
- Kimi Djabaté – featured artist
- Swae Lee – songwriter, featured artist
- Maluma – songwriter, featured artist
- Quavo – songwriter, featured artist
- Tiffin Children's Choir – background vocals
- Steven Klein – photography

== Charts ==
=== Weekly charts ===
2019 weekly chart performance for Madame X
Chart (2019)	Peak position
Argentine Albums (CAPIF)	1
Australian Albums (ARIA)	2
Austrian Albums (Ö3 Austria)	4
Belgian Albums (Ultratop Flanders)	2
Belgian Albums (Ultratop Wallonia)	2
Canadian Albums (Billboard)	2
Croatian International Albums (HDU)	2
Czech Albums (ČNS IFPI)	4
Danish Albums (Hitlisten)	13
Dutch Albums (Album Top 100)	2
Finnish Albums (Suomen virallinen lista)	7
French Albums (SNEP)	4
German Albums (Offizielle Top 100)	5
Greek Albums (IFPI)	4
Hungarian Albums (MAHASZ)	3
Irish Albums (IRMA)	8
Italian Albums (FIMI)	2
Japan Hot Albums (Billboard Japan)	18
Japanese Albums (Oricon)	11
Lithuanian Albums (AGATA)	68
Mexican Albums (Top 100 Mexico)	2
New Zealand Albums (RMNZ)	5
Norwegian Albums (VG-lista)	6
Polish Albums (ZPAV)	7
Portuguese Albums (AFP)	1
Scottish Albums (Official Charts)	4
Slovak Albums (ČNS IFPI)	4
South Korean Albums (Circle)	85
Spanish Albums (Promusicae)	3
Swedish Albums (Sverigetopplistan)	10
Swiss Albums (Schweizer Hitparade)	2
UK Albums (Official Charts)	2
US Billboard 200	1

2021 weekly chart performance for Madame X
Chart (2021)	Position
Italian Albums & Compilations (FIMI)	96

=== Monthly charts ===
Monthly chart performance for Madame X
Chart (2019)	Position
Czech Albums (ČNS IFPI)	15
Croatian Vinyl Albums (HDU)	7
German Vinyl Albums (Offizielle Top 100)	5
Polish Vinyl Albums (ZPAV)	7
Uruguayan Albums (CUD)	8
Slovak Albums (ČNS IFPI)	16

=== Year-end charts ===
Year-end chart performance for Madame X
Chart (2019)	Position
Belgian Albums (Ultratop Flanders)	85
Belgian Albums (Ultratop Wallonia)	74
Dutch Vinyl Albums (Album Top 100)	36
French Albums (SNEP)	133
Hungarian Albums (MAHASZ)	94
Italian Albums (FIMI)	67
Mexican Albums (AMPROFON)	52
Portuguese Albums (AFP)	22
Spanish Albums (PROMUSICAE)	54
Swiss Albums (Schweizer Hitparade)	85
UK Cassettes Albums (OCC)	7
US Top Album Sales (Billboard)	57
US Top Current Albums (Billboard)	45
US Top Internet Albums (Billboard)	23

== Certifications and sales ==
Certifications and sales for Madame X
Region	Certification	Certified units/sales
France	—	29,000
Italy (FIMI)	Gold	25,000^{‡}
Poland (ZPAV)	Gold	10,000^{‡}
United Kingdom (BPI)	Silver	62,531
United States	—	169,000
Summaries
Worldwide	—	500,000
^{‡} Sales+streaming figures based on certification alone.

== See also ==
- List of Billboard 200 number-one albums of 2019
- List of number-one albums of 2019 (Portugal)
- List of number-one digital albums of 2019 (Australia)
