= List of Billboard number-one electronic albums of 2022 =

These are the albums that reached number one on the Billboard Dance/Electronic Albums chart in 2022.

== Chart history ==
Key
†	Indicates best-performing album of 2022

Issue date	Album	Artist	Reference
January 1	The Fame	Lady Gaga	
January 8	The Fame	Lady Gaga	
January 15	The Fame	Lady Gaga	
January 22	The Fame	Lady Gaga	
January 29	Caprisongs	FKA Twigs	
February 5	The Fame	Lady Gaga	
February 12	The Fame	Lady Gaga	
February 19	The Fame	Lady Gaga	
February 26	The Fame	Lady Gaga	
March 5	The Fame	Lady Gaga	
March 12	The Fame	Lady Gaga	
March 19	The Fame	Lady Gaga	
March 26	The Fame	Lady Gaga	
April 2	The Fame	Lady Gaga	
April 9	The Fame	Lady Gaga	
April 16	The Fame	Lady Gaga	
April 23	The Fame	Lady Gaga	
April 30	Paradise Again	Swedish House Mafia	
May 7	The Fame	Lady Gaga	
May 14	The Fame	Lady Gaga	
May 21	The Fame	Lady Gaga	
May 28	So Far So Good	The Chainsmokers	
June 4	Palaces	Flume	
June 11	The Fame	Lady Gaga	
June 18	The Fame	Lady Gaga	
June 25	The Fame	Lady Gaga	
July 2	Honestly, Nevermind †	Drake	
July 9	Honestly, Nevermind †	Drake	
July 16	Honestly, Nevermind †	Drake	
July 23	Honestly, Nevermind †	Drake	
July 30	Honestly, Nevermind †	Drake	
August 6	Honestly, Nevermind †	Drake	
August 13	Honestly, Nevermind †	Drake	
August 20	Honestly, Nevermind †	Drake	
August 27	Honestly, Nevermind †	Drake	
September 3	Finally Enough Love	Madonna	
September 10	Honestly, Nevermind †	Drake	
September 17	Honestly, Nevermind †	Drake	
September 24	Honestly, Nevermind †	Drake	
October 1	Honestly, Nevermind †	Drake	
October 8	Honestly, Nevermind †	Drake	
October 15	Honestly, Nevermind †	Drake	
October 22	Honestly, Nevermind †	Drake	
October 29	Honestly, Nevermind †	Drake	
November 5	Honestly, Nevermind †	Drake	
November 12	Honestly, Nevermind †	Drake	
November 19	Honestly, Nevermind †	Drake	
November 26	Renaissance	Beyoncé	
December 3	Renaissance	Beyoncé	
December 10	Renaissance	Beyoncé	
December 17	Renaissance	Beyoncé	
December 24	Renaissance	Beyoncé	
December 31	Renaissance	Beyoncé	
