= Back That Up to the Beat =

Single by Madonna
- Released: December 30, 2022
- Recorded: 2014
- Length: 3:31 (demo); 3:50 (Madame X version)
- Label: Interscope; Warner
- Songwriters: Madonna Ciccone; Brittany Hazzard; Pharrell Williams
- Producers: Madonna; Jeff Bhasker; Mike Dean; Pharrell Williams

Madonna singles chronology
"Break My Soul (The Queens Remix)" (2022)	"Back That Up to the Beat" (2022)	"Popular" (2023)

Lyric video
- "Back That Up to the Beat" on YouTube

"Back That Up to the Beat" is a song by American singer Madonna. It was released on digital and streaming platforms on December 30, 2022, and impacted radio in Italy on January 20, 2023. Originally titled "Back That Up (Do It)", the demo was recorded for Madonna's 13th studio album Rebel Heart (2015), but did not make it onto the final track listing. The song was leaked to the internet on December 23, 2014. The reworked final version appears as a bonus track on the international deluxe edition of Madonna's fourteenth studio album Madame X (2019).

== Background and release ==
"Back That Up to the Beat" was written by Madonna, Pharrell Williams, and Starrah, while its production was handled by Madonna, Williams, Jeff Bhasker, and Mike Dean. Originally titled "Back That Up (Do It)", the song was first recorded in 2014 and intended for inclusion on Madonna's 13th studio album Rebel Heart (2015). Its demo leaked to the internet on December 23, 2014, and eventually did not made it onto the final track listing of the album. The song was later reworked in 2019 and appeared as a bonus track on the 2-CD deluxe edition of Madonna's 14th studio album Madame X. The Madame X version features a radically different composition, filled with Arabic musical instruments and complex drums.

In September 2022, the original demo version went viral on social media app TikTok, and appeared among the most-searched songs on Shazam globally. The song was also illegally released to Spotify, along with the slowed down and accelerated versions. Interscope Records officially released the demo and sped-up version of "Back That Up to the Beat" on digital and streaming platforms on December 30, 2022. Madonna announced its release by posting a clip of the sped-up version of the song set to a video of her dancing with kids in Malawi and Kenya, including her four children who joined her visit in Africa as part of her Raising Malawi charity campaign. The official lyric video of the song was uploaded to Madonna's YouTube channel on January 7, 2023, which features an extended version of the original clip with a filtered montage of her Instagram reels, videos and pictures. The song was also released to Italian radio on January 20, 2023.

== Critical reception ==
In a review for Wonderland magazine, its editor said that the song "sounds as if it was plucked straight out of an Eastern European discotheque circa 2006. It harnesses the same nostalgia that ignited the Y2K trend; its addictive guitar hooks and carnal bassline has us smashing the replay button into oblivion." Jon Bream from Star Tribune picked the song as one of the week's "6 cool things in music", calling it a "cleaner arrangement [w]ith a staccato, snappy beat..."

== Commercial performance ==
Upon its release to digital outlets, the song entered the top 40 digital charts of Canada, the United Kingdom, and the United States.

== Track listing ==
Digital single

1. "Back That Up to the Beat" (demo version) – 3:31
2. "Back That Up to the Beat" (sped up version) – 3:12

== Charts ==
Weekly chart performances for "Back That Up to the Beat"
Chart (2022–2023)	Peak position
Canada Digital Song Sales (Billboard)	24
Hungary (Single Top 40)	5
Italy Airplay (EarOne)	23
Lithuania (AGATA)	84
San Marino (SMRRTV Top 50)	23
Turkey International Airplay (Radiomonitor)	4
UK Singles Downloads (Official Charts)	14
US Digital Song Sales (Billboard)	33

== Certifications ==
Certifications for "Back That Up to the Beat"
Region	Certification	Certified units/sales
Poland (ZPAV)	Gold	25,000^{‡}
^{‡} Sales+streaming figures based on certification alone.

== Release history ==
"Back That Up to the Beat" release history
Region	Date	Format(s)	Label	Ref.
Various	December 30, 2022	Digital download; streaming	Interscope	
Italy	January 20, 2023	Radio airplay	Universal	
