= I Rise (song) =

2019 song by Madonna

Single by Madonna

from the album Madame X
- Released: October 4, 2019
- Genre: Pop
- Length: 3:44
- Label: Interscope
- Songwriters: Madonna Ciccone; Brittany Talia Hazzard; Jason Evigan
- Producers: Madonna; Jason Evigan

Madonna singles chronology
"Crave" (2019)	"I Rise" (2019)	"I Don't Search I Find" (2020)

"I Rise" is a song by American singer-songwriter Madonna from her fourteenth studio album Madame X (2019). The song was written by the singer herself, alongside Starrah and Jason Evigan, while produced by Madonna and Evigan. It was released on May 3, 2019, by Interscope Records, as the first promotional single from the album, and later sent to Italian radio on October 4, 2019, as the album's third single, by the aforementioned label. The song is a mid tempo pop track which lyrically deals about self-empowerment and draws attention to gun violence in the United States, and contains a sample from a speech by American activist X González.

"I Rise" received generally positive reviews from music critics, who complimented its message and production. The song became Madonna's 49th chart-topping single on the US Hot Dance Club Songs chart, and reached the top 10 on the digital charts in Finland and Greece. An accompanying music video for the song was made in partnership with Time Studios, which was directed by Peter Matkiwsky and released on June 19, 2019. The video features footage of Stoneman Douglas High School shooting survivors, LGBTQ supporters, and women's rights protesters, among other social justice movements. The song was performed during Madonna's set at Stonewall 50 – WorldPride NYC 2019, and as the final number of her 2019–20 Madame X Tour.

== Background and composition ==
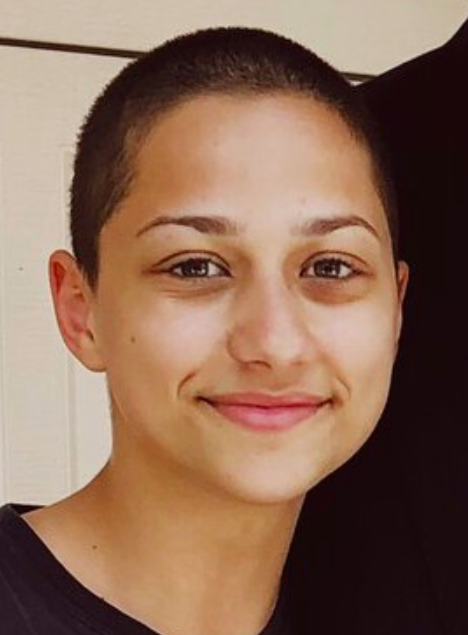
"I Rise" contains a sample from a speech by Stoneman Douglas High School shooting survivor and activist X González.

In 2017, Madonna relocated to Lisbon when seeking a top football academy for her son David Banda, who wanted to become a professional association football player. While living in the city, she began meeting artists; painters and musicians, who would invite her to "living room sessions". In the sessions, they would bring food and sit around the table, and musicians would start playing instruments, singing fado and samba music. Finding herself "connected through music", the singer decided to record a new album, which she titled Madame X: "I found my tribe [in Lisbon] and a magical world of incredible musicians that reinforced my belief that music across the world is truly all connected and is the soul of the universe." For Madame X, she worked with several producers, such as longtime collaborator Mirwais, who had previously contributed to her albums Music (2000), American Life (2003) and Confessions on a Dance Floor (2005), as well as Mike Dean, who was a producer on Rebel Heart (2015), and Diplo. Madonna stated that she wrote "I Rise" as a way of giving a voice to marginalized people who felt they did not have an opportunity to speak their minds, and that she hoped that it would encourage "all individuals to be who they are, to speak their minds and to love themselves". The song was released on May 3, 2019, as the first promotional single from Madame X, by Interscope Records. It was later sent to Italian radio stations on October 4, 2019, as the album's third single, by the aforementioned label.

"I Rise" was written by Madonna, Starrah and Jason Evigan, while production was handled by the singer and Evigan. It has been described as a mid tempo pop song that lyrically deals about self-empowerment and draws attention to gun violence in the United States, but can also be seen as "an allegory for the highs and lows" of Madonna's career, according to HuffPost's Daniel Welsh. The song begins with a sample from Stoneman Douglas High School shooting survivor and activist X González's speech, in which they declare, "They say us kids don't know what we're talking about, that we're too young to understand how the government works. We call BS". Later within the track, the words "no BS" are echoed at the end of several verses. On "I Rise", Madonna sings: "There's nothing you can do to me that hasn't been done / Not bulletproof, shouldn't have to run from a gun / River of tears ran dry, let 'em run / No game that you can play with me I ain't won", over Auto-Tuned vocals. She also cites a quote by French philosopher Jean-Paul Sartre, that says, "Freedom's what you choose to do with what's been done to you."

== Critical reception ==
"I Rise" was met with generally positive reviews from music critics. Mark Kennedy from the Associated Press gave Madame X an overall negative review, but selected the track as one of the album's best songs. Louise Bruton of The Irish Times opined that it was a "gimmick-free, uplifting ballad", and noted that "Madonna knows the power she wields, and as a long-time advocate for the LGBTQ+ community and people living with HIV, she plays that card very well" on the song. For Nick Smith from musicOMH, "I Rise" was "powerful and introspective", and complimented the González's sample, calling it "emotional". Wren Graves from Consequence of Sound wrote that the track was "rousing stuff", while Hot Press' Paul Nolan called it "stirring". Jamie Tabberer from Gay Star News classified the track as a "self-empowerment anthem" with "heartfelt lyrics" that sounded "autobiographical". Samuel R. Murrian from Parade wrote that it was a "moving, triumphant ode to genuine strength" and also noted the "dreamy lyrics and ethereal production". According to The Guardian's Ben Beaumont-Thomas, "I Rise" has "elegant, sinewy melodies that twine around you rather than jabbing you into submission". Trey Alston from MTV called it "powerful and uplifting". He further wrote that the song was "as soft as war chants come, but there's power in this fragility".

According to Victoria Segal from Q magazine, "I Rise" "keep[s] pace with a world out of joint", while Michael Arceneaux of NBC News commented that it was one of the songs that "do deserve airplay". Chuck Arnold of the New York Post thought the song was an "anthemic ballad" and that it "proves once more" as to why Madonna is "pop's ultimate survivor". Metro Weekly's Sean Maunier felt that Madonna found "some redemption" on the song. Daniel Megarry from Gay Times opined that while the track "isn't top tier" with other Madonna songs such as "Live To Tell" (1986) and "Take a Bow" (1994), "it's still a pleasant listen", and praised its lyrical message. According to NME's El Hunt, the song's Sartre quote "can border on inspirational fridge magnet territory, too broad to establish real connection". A more critical review came from Milenio's Ernesto Sanchez, who complimented the production, but was not impressed with the song's chorus and level of creativity, and said it sounded like an outtake from Rebel Heart.

Slant Magazine placed "I Rise" at number 67 on their list of the 82 best Madonna singles. For the magazine, Sal Cinquemani wrote, "The track itself is less affecting than its message, with unnecessary Auto-Tune rendering Madonna's soaring rhetoric nearly robotic." The Tracy Young remix of the song won the Best Remixed Recording award at the 62nd Annual Grammy Awards. With this feat, Young became the first woman to win the award. It also achieved a nomination at the 34th Annual International Dance Music Awards, in the category Best Remix.

== Commercial performance ==
In the United States, "I Rise" became Madonna's 65th entry on Billboard's Dance Club Songs chart. The song ultimately reached the summit of the chart, becoming her 48th chart-topping single on it for the issue date of August 31, 2019. On the year-end US Dance Club Songs chart, "I Rise" ranked at number 31. The song debuted on its peak of number 37 on the US Dance/Mix Show Airplay chart for the issue dated July 13, 2019. This gave Madonna her 15th entry on the chart and her 1st since "Living for Love" (2014). "I Rise" also peaked at number 95 in Croatia, on the week of May 20, 2019. The song further peaked at numbers four and nine on Finland and Greece's digital songs charts, respectively. In Hungary, it reached number 27 on the national chart, while the song peaked at number 45 on the Scottish Singles Chart for the week ending May 10, 2019. "I Rise" reached number 40 on the UK Singles Downloads Chart.

== Promotion ==
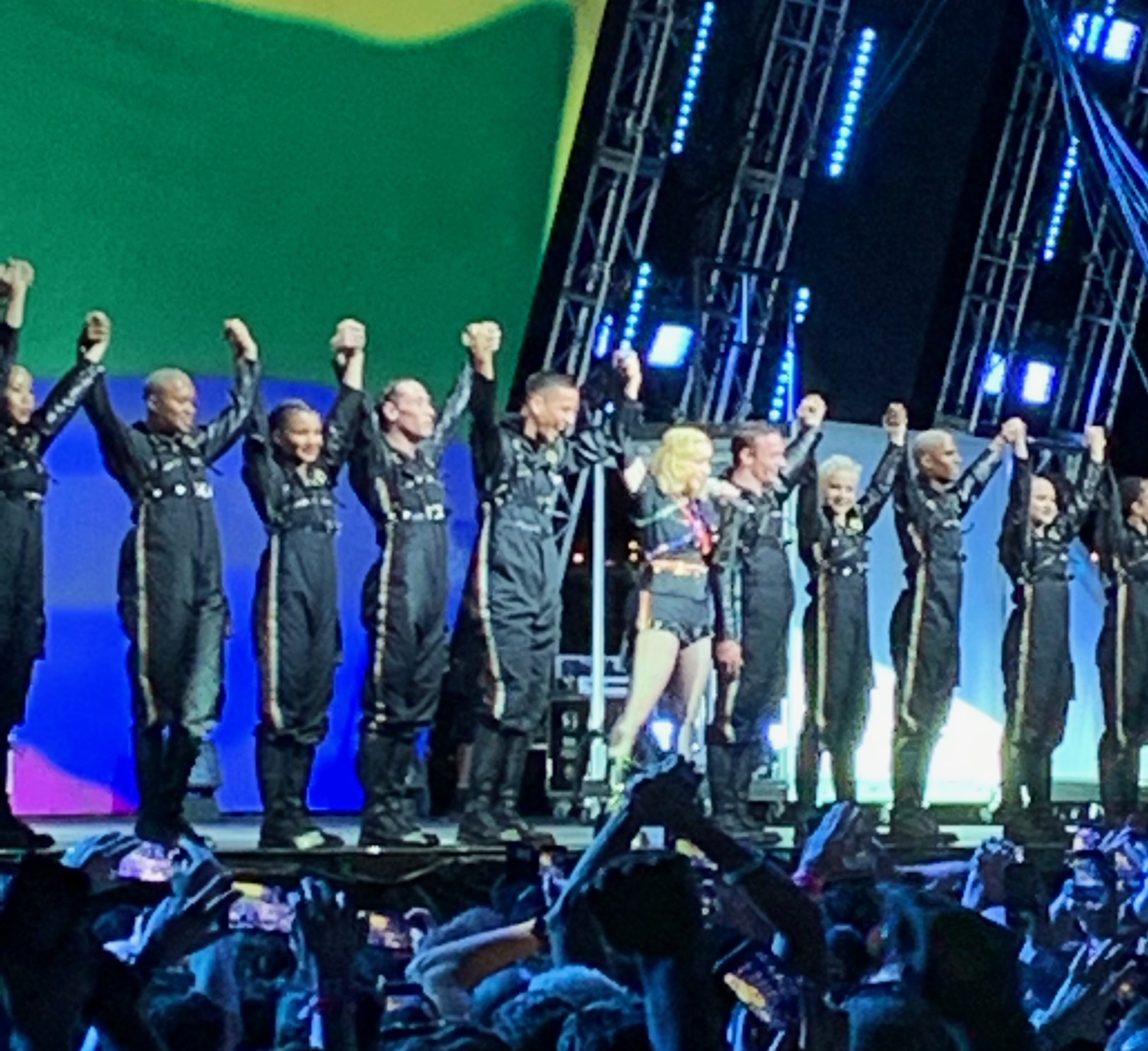
Madonna ending her set at Stonewall 50 – WorldPride NYC 2019 with a performance of "I Rise"

Madonna partnered with Time Studios to create a music video for "I Rise", which was directed by Peter Matkiwsky and released on June 19, 2019. Madonna herself does not appear in the video, but it instead shows footage of the Stoneman Douglas High School shooting survivors, LGBTQ supporters, women's rights protesters, Olympic gymnast Aly Raisman's testimony about sexual abuse, Filipino journalist Maria Ressa's arrest, among other social justice movements. Mike Wass from Idolator commented that the clip "conveys the song's powerful message in a striking way", while according to Alexander Kacala from The Advocate, "Madonna has never shied away from making bold statements with her work", and the video was "a testament to that".

The first live performance of "I Rise" took place during Madonna's appearance at Stonewall 50 – WorldPride NYC 2019, where it was the closing number. The backdrops depicted imagery of the students who spearheaded the March for Our Lives movement, along with the word "resist"; Madonna wore an eye-patch over her left eye, while her background dancers were dressed as police officers that wielded. After the performance, fireworks exploded over the venue.

"I Rise" was performed as the encore of the singer's 2019–20 Madame X Tour. The performance began with González's speech being presented on the screen, which then showed news footage of protests and marches. At the end of the performance, the screen turned the colors of the Rainbow flag, followed by Madonna and her dancers exiting the stage with their fists raised. During her stop at the London Palladium on February 5, 2020, halfway through the song's performance, the theatre dropped the stage curtain and switched off the sound as Madonna had gone past her deadline; the rest of the performance was done a capella. This angered the singer, who took to her Instagram account for accusing the venue of trying to censor her show. The performance was included as the final track on the live album Madame X: Music from the Theater Xperience.

== Track listings ==
- Digital download / streaming
1. "I Rise" – 3:44
- 7" picture disc (Madame X deluxe box set)
1. "I Rise" – 3:44
2. "I Rise" (instrumental) – 3:44
- Digital download / streaming (Tracy Young remixes)
1. "I Rise" (Tracy Young's Pride extended remix) – 6:31
2. "I Rise" (Tracy Young's Pride dub) – 6:31
3. "I Rise" (Tracy Young's Pride intro radio remix) – 3:50
- Digital download / streaming (Remixes)
1. "I Rise" (DJLW remix) – 4:36
2. "I Rise" (Kue drops the funk remix) – 5:56
3. "I Rise" (Offer Nissim remix) – 6:56
4. "I Rise" (Thomas Gold remix) – 3:17
5. "I Rise" (Daybreakers remix) – 5:24
6. "I Rise" (DJ Irene & The Alliance remix) – 3:50
- 12" vinyl single
1. "I Rise" (Tracy Young's Pride extended remix) – 6:31
2. "I Rise" (Kue drops the funk remix) – 5:56
3. "I Rise" (Daybreakers remix) – 5:24
4. "I Rise" (Thomas Gold remix) – 3:17
5. "I Rise" (DJLW remix) – 4:36
6. "I Rise" (Offer Nissim remix) – 6:56

== Personnel ==
Credits adapted from Tidal.

- Madonna – vocals, songwriter, production
- X González – vocals
- Jason Evigan – songwriter, production
- Brittany Talia Hazzard – songwriter

== Charts ==
=== Weekly charts ===
Chart (2019)	Peak position
Croatia (HRT)	95
Finland Digital Songs (Billboard)	4
France Downloads (SNEP)	32
Greece Digital Songs (Billboard)	9
Hungary (Single Top 40)	27
Scottish Singles Sales (Official Charts)	45
UK Singles Downloads (Official Charts)	40
US Dance Airplay (Billboard)	37
US Dance Club Songs (Billboard)	1

=== Year-end charts ===
Chart (2019)	Position
US Dance Club Songs (Billboard)	31

== Release history ==
List of release dates and formats for "I Rise"
Region	Date	Format(s)	Version	Label	Ref.
Various	May 3, 2019	Digital download; streaming	Original	Interscope	
Various	July 19, 2019	Digital download; streaming	Tracy Young remixes	Interscope	
Various	August 16, 2019	Digital download; streaming	Remixes	Interscope	
Italy	October 4, 2019	Radio airplay	Original	Universal	
United States	November 29, 2019	12-inch single	Remixes	Interscope	

== See also ==
- List of Billboard number-one dance songs of 2019
