= List of artists who reached number one on the Australian albums chart =

This is a list of recording artists who have reached number one on Australia's albums chart from 1965 to the present.

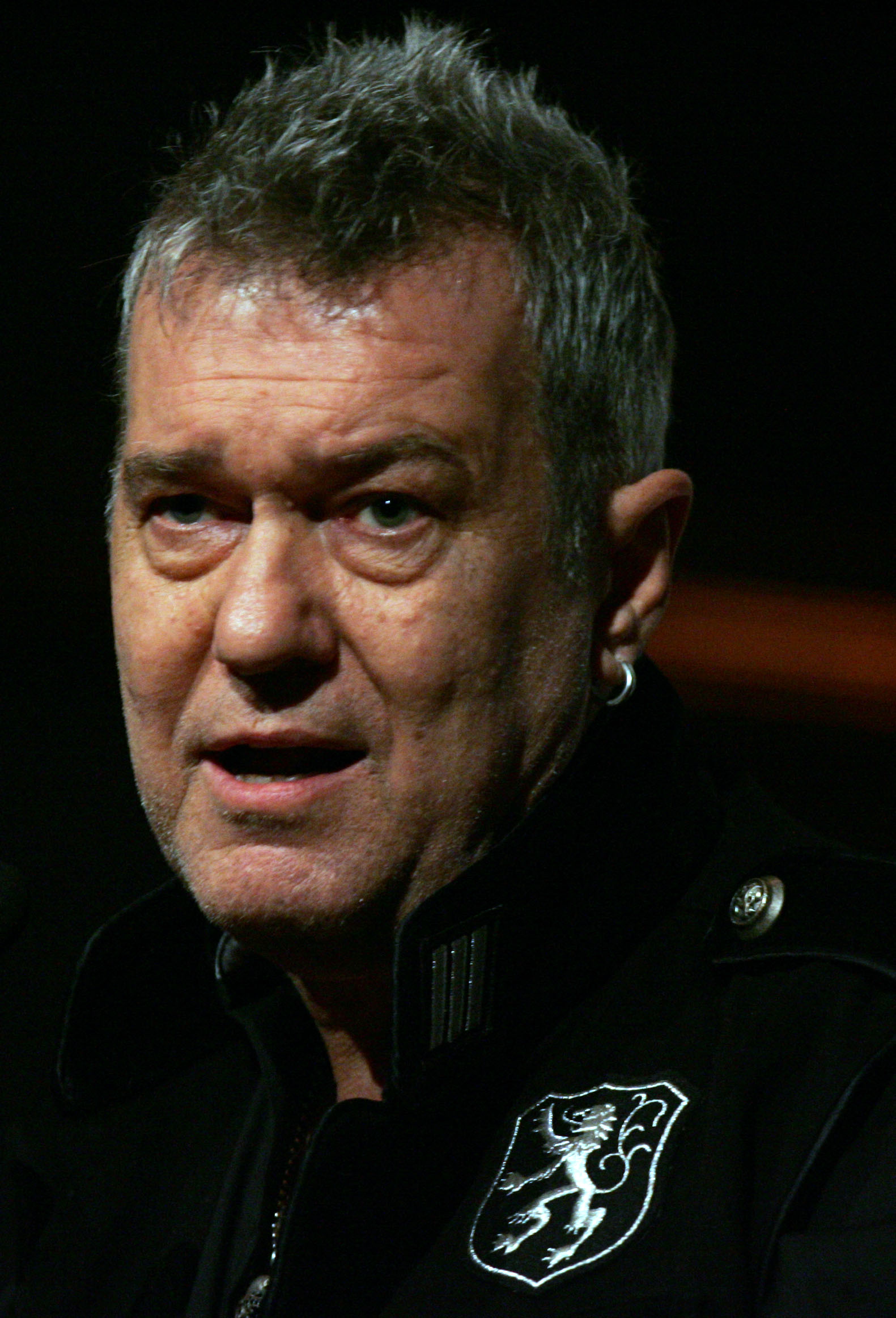
Jimmy Barnes holds the record for the most number-one albums with 16 and most by an Australian.

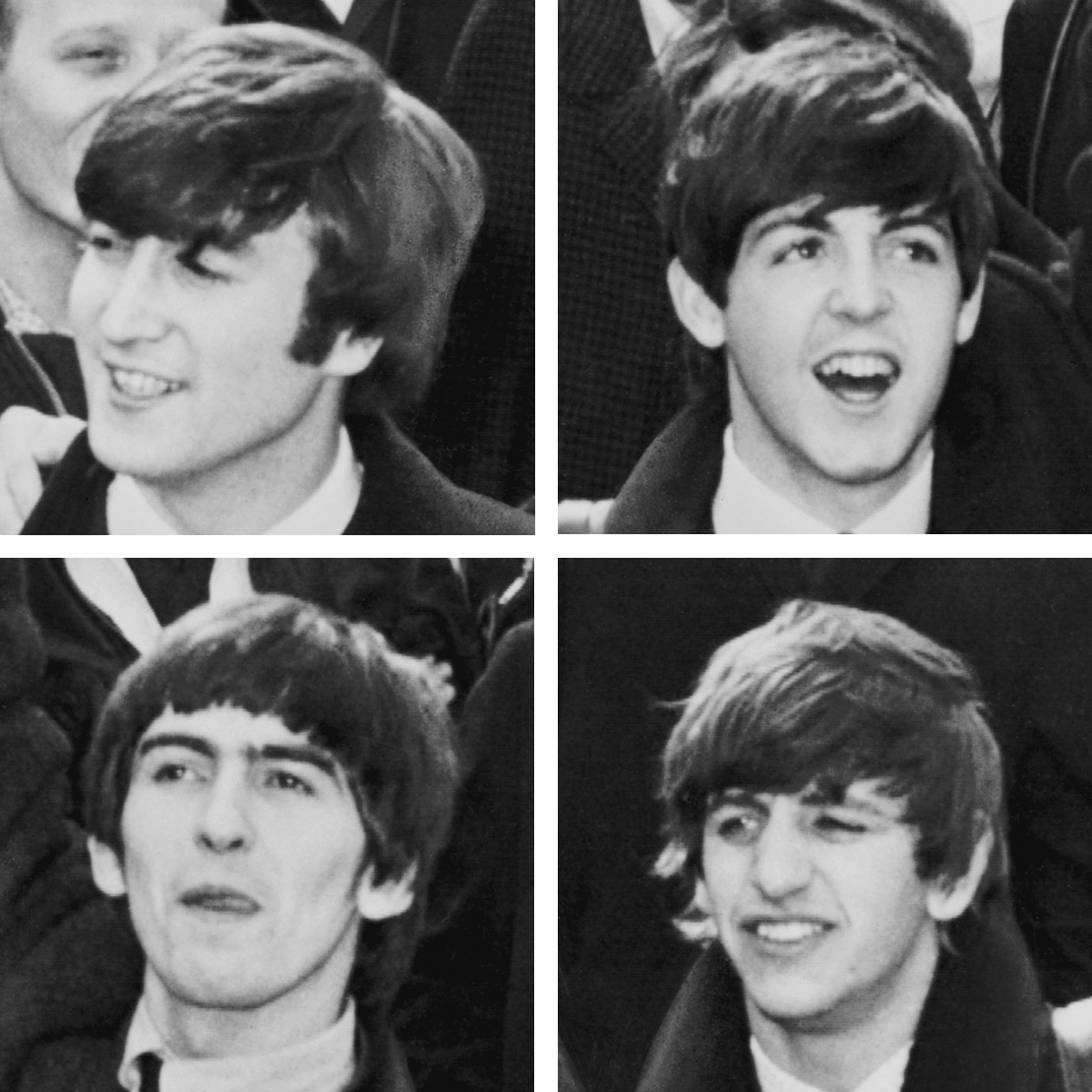
The Beatles hold the record for the most number-one albums for a band with 14.

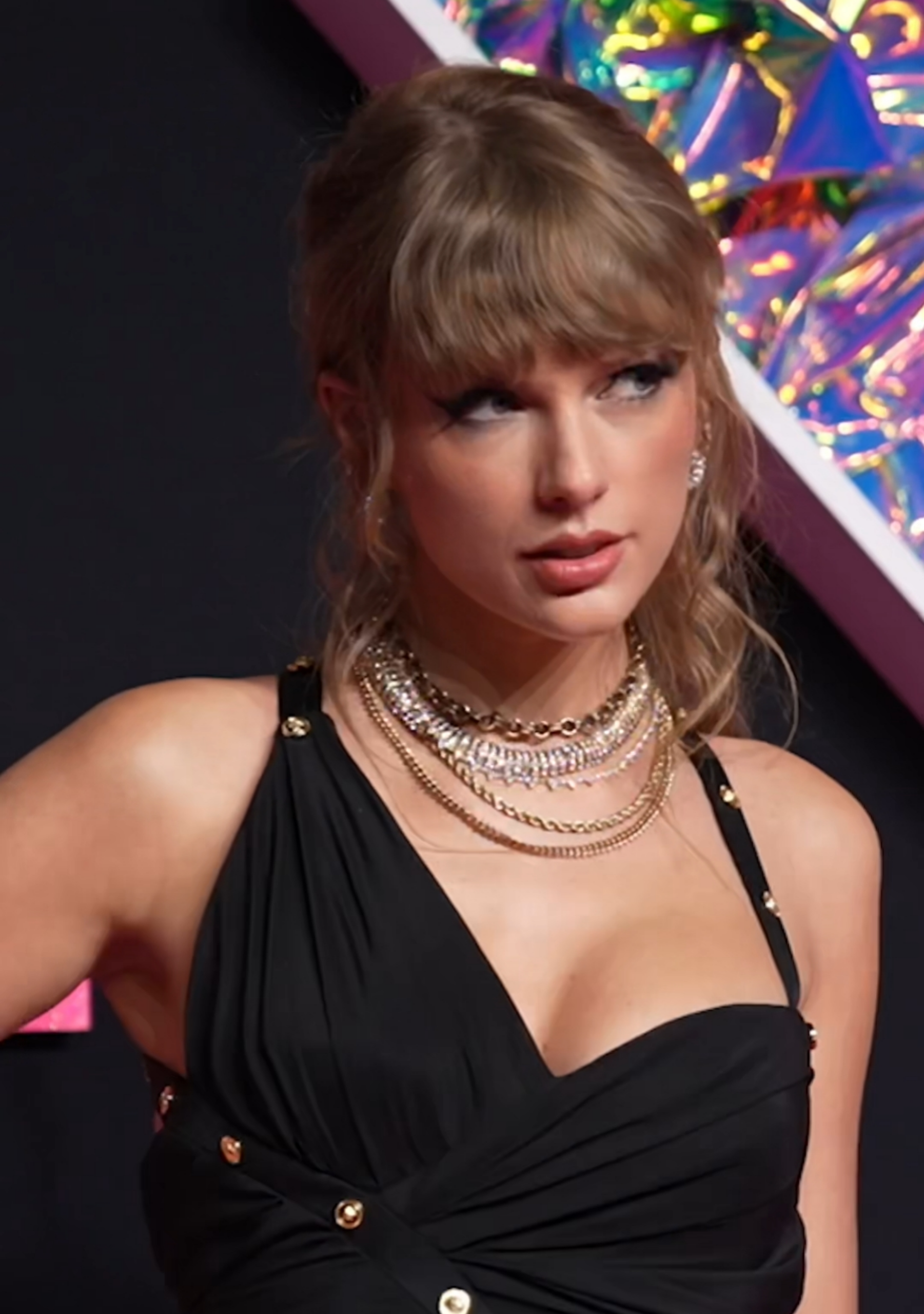
Taylor Swift holds the record for most number-one album among female artists with 14

- All acts are listed alphabetically.
- Solo artists are alphabetised by last name, Groups by group name excluding "A", "An", and "The".
- Each act's total of number-one albums is shown after their name.
- All artists who are mentioned on the front of the album are listed here
- Soundtracks can't be listed as they are listed under various artists

== 0-9 ==
- The Three Tenors (2)
- 5 Seconds of Summer (6)
- The 12th Man (7)
- 21 Savage (1)
- 28 Days (1)
- 50 Cent (1)
- 1927 (1)
- The 1975 (3)
- 1992 Australian Cast (1)

== A ==
- AC/DC (6)
- ABBA (5)
- Paula Abdul (1)
- Gracie Abrams (2)
- Bryan Adams (2)
- Adele (3)
- Aerosmith (1)
- Christina Aguilera (1)
- Air Supply (1)
- Lily Allen (1)
- Herb Alpert (2)
- Vanessa Amorosi (1)
- The Amity Affliction (4)
- Anastacia (1)
- The Angels (1)
- Aqua (1)
- Architects (1)
- Arctic Monkeys (3)
- Tina Arena (2)
- Rick Astley (1)
- Audioslave (1)
- Australian Crawl (2)
- The Avalanches (1)
- Avicii (1)

== B ==
- The B-52's (1)
- Baby Animals (1)
- Angelo Badalamenti (1)
- Ball Park Music (1)
- Bananarama (1)
- Bardot (1)
- Jimmy Barnes (16)
- Natalie Bassingthwaighte (1)
- Beabadoobee (1)
- Beastie Boys (1)
- The Beatles (14)
- Bee Gees (4)
- Beyoncé (4)
- Justin Bieber (4)
- Birds of Tokyo (2)
- Birdy (1)
- Limp Bizkit (1)
- Black Box (1)
- The Black Keys (1)
- Blondie (1)
- Michael Bolton (2)
- Benson Boone (1)
- David Bowie (3)
- Boy & Bear (2)
- The Black Eyed Peas (3)
- James Blunt (2)
- Bliss n Eso (4)
- Bob the Builder (1)
- Bon Jovi (10)
- Bond (1)
- Susan Boyle (2)
- Daryl Braithwaite (1)
- Bring Me the Horizon (4)
- Phoebe Bridgers (1)
- Garth Brooks (1)
- BTS (4)
- Michael Bublé (5)
- Jeff Buckley (1)
- Bullet For My Valentine (1)
- Busby Marou (1)
- Joff Bush (1)

== C ==
- Anthony Callea (3)
- Lewis Capaldi (1)
- Mariah Carey (3)
- Sabrina Carpenter (2)
- The Carpenters (1)
- The Cat Empire (2)
- Kasey Chambers (5)
- The Chemical Brothers (1)
- Cher (1)
- Toni Childs (1)
- Eric Clapton (1)
- Joe Cocker (2)
- Cold Chisel (6)
- Coldplay (8)
- J. Cole (1)
- Natalie Cole (1)
- Phil Collins (2)
- Luke Combs (1)
- Bradley Cooper (1)
- Matt Corby (1)
- The Corrs (2)
- Harrison Craig (1)
- The Cranberries (2)
- Michael Crawford (3)
- Cream (2)
- Creedence Clearwater Revival (3)
- Crosby, Stills, Nash & Young (1)
- Sheryl Crow (1)
- Crowded House (5)
- The Cruel Sea (1)
- Cub Sport (1)
- Cut Copy (1)
- The Cure (1)
- Culture Club (1)
- Paulini (1)
- Billy Ray Cyrus (1)
- Miley Cyrus (3)

== D ==
- D12 (1)
- Terence Trent D'Arby (1)
- Daddy Cool (1)
- Daft Punk (1)
- A Day To Remember (1)
- Olivia Dean (1)
- Deep Purple (2)
- Lana Del Rey (5)
- John Denver (1)
- Def Leppard (2)
- Deftones (1)
- Neil Diamond (6)
- Dido (2)
- Diesel (2)
- Dire Straits (4)
- Disturbed (2)
- Celine Dion (5)
- DMA's (1)
- Drake (6)
- Drapht (1)
- Dr. Dre (1)
- Dr. Hook & The Medicine Show (1)
- Hilary Duff (1)
- Duran Duran (1)
- Dune Rats (2)
- Bob Dylan (4)

== E ==
- Eagles (3)
- Karise Eden (1)
- Billie Eilish (3)
- Electric Light Orchestra (3)
- Eminem (11)
- Enya (1)
- Cynthia Erivo (1)
- Eskimo Joe (2)
- Gloria Estefan (1)
- Eurythmics (2)
- Evanescence (2)

== F ==
- Faith No More (1)
- Chet Faker (1)
- Bernard Fanning (2)
- John Farnham (10)
- Fergie (1)
- Bryan Ferry (1)
- Billy Field (1)
- Ruby Fields (1)
- Neil Finn (1)
- Fleetwood Mac (1)
- G Flip (1)
- Florence and the Machine (2)
- Flume (2)
- Foals (1)
- Fontaines D.C. (1)
- Foo Fighters (8)
- Foster the People (1)
- The Fray (1)
- Sia (2)
- Future (1)

== G ==
- Kenny G (1)
- Lady Gaga (4)
- Gang of Youths (2)
- Garbage (1)
- George (1)
- Ghost (1)
- Barry Gibb (1)
- Glee Cast (2)
- Selena Gomez (1)
- Delta Goodrem (5)
- Good Charlotte (2)
- Gotye (1)
- Gorillaz (1)
- Ariana Grande (7)
- Macy Gray (1)
- Green Day (3)
- Guns N' Roses (2)
- Gyroscope (1)

== H ==
- Hanson (1)
- George Harrison (1)
- Ben Harper (1)
- Luke Hemmings (1)
- Taylor Henderson (2)
- Jimi Hendrix (1)
- Hermitude (1)
- Missy Higgins (4)
- Hillsong Church (1)
- Hillsong United (2)
- Hillsong Worship (1)
- Hilltop Hoods (7)
- Hinder (1)
- Calum Hood (1)
- Niall Horan (1)
- James Horner (1)
- Hothouse Flowers (1)
- Whitney Houston (2)
- Human Nature (3)
- Huskii (1)

== I ==
- Ian Moss (1)
- Icehouse (1)
- Enrique Iglesias (1)
- Il Divo (2)
- Illy (2)
- Natalie Imbruglia (1)
- Dami Im (1)
- INXS (4)
- Chris Isaak (1)

== J ==
- Janet Jackson (2)
- Michael Jackson (6)
- Jack Johnson (4)
- Jamiroquai (2)
- Jet (1)
- Jive Bunny and the Mastermixers (1)
- Billy Joel (4)
- Elton John (6)
- Daniel Johns (1)
- The John Butler Trio (3)
- Norah Jones (1)
- Rickie Lee Jones (1)
- Joji (1)
- Janis Joplin (1)
- Juice Wrld (1)
- The Jungle Giants (1)

== K ==
- Karnivool (2)
- Ronan Keating (1)
- Noah Kahan (1)
- Machine Gun Kelly (1)
- Paul Kelly (4)
- Lee Kernaghan (1)
- Kerser (1)
- The Kid Laroi (1)
- The Killers (3)
- Killing Heidi (1)
- Kings of Leon (4)
- Kiss (1)
- The Knack (1)
- Korn (3)
- Lenny Kravitz (1)

== L ==
- Cyndi Lauper (1)
- Led Zeppelin (4)
- Kendrick Lamar (3)
- k.d. lang (2)
- Avril Lavigne (3)
- Damien Leith (1)
- John Lennon (3)
- Dean Lewis (1)
- Leona Lewis (1)
- Lil Nas X (1)
- Lil Uzi Vert (1)
- Lime Cordiale (2)
- Linkin Park (4)
- Dua Lipa (1)
- Live (3)
- The Living End (2)
- London Grammar (1)
- Lukas Graham (1)
- Lorde (4)
- Mirusia Louwerse (1)

== M ==
- Meg Mac (1)
- The Madden Brothers (1)
- Madonna (13)
- Zayn (1)
- Post Malone (2)
- Maroon 5 (1)
- Marilyn Manson (2)
- Bruno Mars (1)
- Ricky Martin (1)
- Melanie Martinez (1)
- Richard Marx (1)
- Massive Attack (1)
- Matchbox Twenty (4)
- John Mayer (2)
- Jessica Mauboy (2)
- Paul Mauriat (1)
- Paul McCartney (2)
- Don McLean (1)
- Meat Loaf (2)
- Megadeth (1)
- John Cougar Mellencamp (1)
- Men at Work (2)
- Shawn Mendes (1)
- Metallica (8)
- George Michael (1)
- Bette Midler (1)
- Midnight Oil (6)
- Milli Vanilli (1)
- Kylie Minogue (9)
- MKTO (1)
- Moby (2)
- Alanis Morissette (2)
- Van Morrison (1)
- Motor Ace (1)
- Moving Pictures (1)
- Pete Murray (3)
- Mumford & Sons (2)
- Muse (4)

== N ==
- Olivia Newton-John (5)
- Shane Nicholson (1)
- Nick Cave & the Bad Seeds (2)
- Nickelback (1)
- Nirvana (3)
- Noiseworks (1)
- Northlane (2)
- Shannon Noll (2)

== O ==
- Oasis (2)
- Sinéad O'Connor (1)
- Frank Ocean (1)
- Of Monsters and Men (1)
- The Offspring (2)
- Mike Oldfield (1)
- One Direction (4)
- Original Broadway Cast (1)
- Yoko Ono (1)
- Roy Orbison (1)

== P ==
- Panic! at the Disco (2)
- Pantera (1)
- Paramore (3)
- Parkway Drive (3)
- Passenger (1)
- Paul Potts (1)
- Paul Simon (1)
- Peach PRC (1)
- Katy Perry (2)
- Pearl Jam (8)
- Maisie Peters (1)
- Pink (7)
- Pink Floyd (4)
- Polaris (1)
- The Police (4)
- Pop Smoke (1)
- Powderfinger (6)
- The Presets (1)
- Elvis Presley (2)
- Prince (1)
- The Prodigy (1)

== Q ==
- Suzi Quatro (1)
- Queen (2)
- Queen + Adam Lambert (1)
- Queens of the Stone Age (3)

== R ==
- Ratcat (1)
- Red Hot Chili Peppers (7)
- R.E.M. (1)
- Cliff Richard (2)
- Lionel Richie (2)
- André Rieu (1)
- Olivia Rodrigo (3)
- Rodney Rude (1)
- The Rolling Stones (8)
- Linda Ronstadt (1)
- Roxy Music (1)
- The Rubens (1)
- RÜFÜS (3)

== S ==
- Sam Smith (2)
- Santana (2)
- Savage Garden (2)
- Leo Sayer (1)
- Boz Scaggs (1)
- Scissor Sisters (1)
- Travis Scott (2)
- Guy Sebastian (3)
- The Seekers (1)
- Bob Seger (1)
- Conrad Sewell (1)
- Shakira (1)
- Amy Shark (3)
- Sherbet (2)
- Sheppard (1)
- Ed Sheeran (8)
- Vonda Shepard (1)
- Ty Dolla Sign (1)
- Silverchair (5)
- Carly Simon (1)
- Simon & Garfunkel (2)
- Simple Minds (1)
- Troye Sivan (2)
- Skegss (1)
- Skyhooks (2)
- Slade (1)
- Sleep Token (1)
- Slipknot (4)
- The Smashing Pumpkins (2)
- The Smith Street Band (1)
- Sneaky Sound System (1)
- Snow Patrol (1)
- Something for Kate (2)
- Soundgarden (2)
- Spacey Jane (1)
- Britney Spears (1)
- Spice Girls (1)
- Spin Doctors (1)
- Split Enz (3)
- Bruce Springsteen (5)
- Stand Atlantic (1)
- Stars on 45 (1)
- Cat Stevens (2)
- Stevie Nicks (1)
- Sticky Fingers (1)
- Sting (1)
- Short Stack (1)
- Gwen Stefani (1)
- Rod Stewart (7)
- Angus & Julia Stone (3)
- Stone Temple Pilots (1)
- Barbra Streisand (3)
- The Strokes (1)
- Harry Styles (4)
- Taylor Swift (14)
- Teddy Swims (1)
- Tash Sultana (1)
- Supertramp (1)
- System of a Down (1)
- SZA (1)

== T ==
- Tame Impala (2)
- Taxiride (1)
- The Temper Trap (2)
- The Teskey Brothers (2)
- Rob Thomas (1)
- Justin Timberlake (2)
- Timbaland (1)
- Tones and I (2)
- Tool (3)
- Toto (1)
- Meghan Trainor (1)
- Traveling Wilburys (1)
- Jethro Tull (1)
- Shania Twain (3)
- Twenty One Pilots (2)
- Tyler, the Creator (1)

== U ==
- U2 (12)
- UB40 (1)
- Keith Urban (4)
- Usher (1)

== V ==
- Vance Joy (2)
- Vika & Linda (1)
- Violent Soho (2)
- Village People (1)

== W ==
- The Waifs (1)
- Morgan Wallen (2)
- Anthony Warlow (1)
- Alex Warren (1)
- John Wayne (1)
- Andrew Lloyd Webber (1)
- The Weeknd (5)
- Kanye West (5)
- Westlife (1)
- Wet Leg (1)
- Wham! (1)
- The Whitlams (1)
- Wicked Movie Cast (1)
- The Wiggles (1)
- Pharrell Williams (1)
- Robbie Williams (5)
- John Williamson (1)
- Wings (2)

== X ==
- Charli XCX (3)
- The xx (1)

== Y ==
- You Am I (3)
- Yungblud (2)
- Geoffrey Gurrumul Yunupingu (1)

== See also ==
- Music of Australia
