= I Don't Search I Find =

2020 single by Madonna

- Remixes EP cover

Single by Madonna

from the album Madame X
- Released: May 22, 2020
- Genre: Dance-pop; EDM; deep house
- Length: 4:08
- Label: Interscope
- Songwriters: Madonna; Mirwais Ahmadzaï
- Producers: Madonna; Mirwais

Madonna singles chronology
"I Rise" (2019)	"I Don't Search I Find" (2020)	"Levitating (The Blessed Madonna Remix)" (2020)

Licensed audio
- "I Don’t Search I Find" on YouTube

"I Don't Search I Find" is a song by American singer Madonna from her fourteenth studio album, Madame X (2019). The track was written and produced by Madonna, alongside Mirwais Ahmadzaï. It was released to Italian contemporary hit radio by Interscope Records as the fourth single from the album on May 22, 2020. Two EPs containing several remixes had previously been released to accompany the song. It is an EDM and house influenced track that takes inspiration from Madonna's previous works, including "Vogue" (1990), Erotica (1992) and Confessions on a Dance Floor (2005).

"I Don't Search I Find" received generally positive feedback from music critics, who praised its sound and deemed the track one of the best songs from Madame X. It gave Madonna her 50th chart-topping single on the US Billboard Dance Club Songs chart, making her the first act in history to score at least 50 number one songs on a single Billboard chart. On the UK singles sales chart, the track reached number 66. Madonna performed it on her 2019–2020 Madame X Tour and at a New York gay pride party in June 2021.

== Background and composition ==
In 2017, Madonna relocated to Lisbon when seeking a top football academy for her son David Banda, who wanted to become a professional association football player. While living in the city, she began meeting artists; painters and musicians, who would invite her to "living room sessions". In the sessions, they would bring food and sit around the table, and musicians would start playing instruments, singing Fado and samba music. On April 15, 2019, Madonna revealed her upcoming fourteenth studio album's title Madame X. For the album, she worked with longtime collaborator Mirwais, who had previously contributed to her albums Music (2000), American Life (2003) and Confessions on a Dance Floor (2005), as well as Mike Dean, who served as a producer on Rebel Heart (2015), and Diplo.

"I Don't Search I Find" was written by Madonna and Mirwais, who also handled production. The track takes its title after a quote by Pablo Picasso, and has been described as a disco and EDM song with a "chunky '90s house percussion" and "rumbling" bassline; the track draws influence from Madonna's previous works, such as "Vogue" (1990), Erotica (1992) and Confessions on a Dance Floor. Throughout the song, Madonna repeats the hook "finally, enough love" and, with a "wide-eyed and awestruck" tone, she repeats the phrase "I found you, I found a new view". Also included is a finger snapping sample, taken from "Vogue". According to Paper, with the line "Platinum gold, inside your soul", Madonna was "affirming the beauty in others". Paul Nolan, from Hot Press, considered "I Don't Search I Find" the "manifesto for Madame X".

== Release and promotion ==
On December 6, 2019, an extended play (EP) featuring three remixes of the song created by Honey Dijon was released for digital download and streaming through Interscope Records. An additional EP that includes remixes by Chris Cox, Endor, DJLW, DJ Kue, and Offer Nissim, was released on May 2, 2020, by the aforementioned label. In Italy, Universal Music Group released "I Don't Search I Find" as the fourth single from Madame X on May 22, 2020. Commercially, in the United States, "I Don't Search I Find" became Madonna's 67th entry on Billboard's Dance Club Songs chart, where it debuted at number 54. It eventually reached the summit, making Madonna the first act in history to score at least 50 number one songs on a single Billboard chart, as well as across five decades. Madonna expressed her gratitude in a statement to Billboard; "dance is my first love [...] so every time one of my songs is celebrated in the clubs and recognized on the charts it feels like home". That same week, the song peaked at number 30 on the US Dance/Electronic Songs chart. In the United Kingdom, "I Don't Search I Find" entered the Singles Sales chart at number 66 on May 8, 2020. It reached the fifth position on the Greece Digital Song Sales chart, and peaked at number 73 in Slovakia.

"I Don't Search I Find" was featured on Madonna's 2019–2020 Madame X Tour. It was included on the show's second act and featured the singer performing "in secret agent mode". She was flanked by lookalike dancers dressed as "noir detectives", wearing blonde wigs and trench coats, who eventually subdue her and interrogate her. The performance was praised by the Miami New Times' Celia Almeida, who expressed that Madonna "embodied her femme fatale Madame X persona in an interrogation scene that recalled Michael Jackson's noir music video for 'Smooth Criminal'". The performance was included on the live album Madame X: Music from the Theater Xperience. On June 24, 2021, the singer made a surprise appearance at a pride party at the Boom Boom Room of The Standard hotel in New York and performed the song; she wore a see-through mesh top, leather shorts, a vintage Jean Paul Gaultier corset, a blue wig and long pink fingerless gloves. "I Don't Search I Find" was used as an interlude on Madonna's Celebration tour (2023–2024).

== Critical reception ==
Upon release, the song was met with generally positive reviews from music critics. Slant Magazine's Sal Cinquemani called it "smoldering" and compared the song to "Vogue" and "Erotica" (1992), concluding that it "isn't a song so much as a mood. It's downstairs music, the distant bassline rumbling beneath your feet as you slip into a bathroom stall for a quick bump or fuck." From NME, El Hunt also compared the song to "Vogue" and deemed it an album standout. Jeremy Halliger, writing for Variety, said the song was "pure '90s disco bliss, the album's only non-stop party." Mark Savage from the BBC felt it "updates the deep house grooves of the Erotica era." Ben Beaumont-Thomas from The Guardian praised its house-influenced sound and compared the song to "Deeper and Deeper" (1992). Jaime Tabberer, from Gay Star News, opined that "once it gets going, disco stomper 'I Don’t Search I Find' is a class of its own", and described it as "a Confessions number that criminally ended up on the cutting room floor." Gay Times' Daniel Megarry deemed the second best track on Madame X; "if 'Justify My Love', 'Rescue Me' and the best bits of Confessions On A Dance Floor had a lovechild, it'd be this [...] Absolute heaven."

In her review of Madame X, Alexandra Pollard from The Independent described the track as "a cross between Nina Simone's 'Feeling Good', a Nineties house track, and an orchestral Bond song." Nicolas Hautman from Us Weekly deemed it "one of the fiercest '90s dance songs she has made" since the 1990s decade. Louise Bruton from The Irish Times stated of Madonna's performance that "she reminds us that she always gets what she wants." Robbie Barnett from the Washington Blade wrote: "if Music and American Life had a baby with Confessions on a Dance Floor as its stepmother, it would be the mid-tempo treasure 'I Don't Search I Find'", comparing it to Madonna's 1991 single "Rescue Me". On a more critical note, The Hollywood Reporter's Jonny Coleman said that "even though it's a clear rip-off of 'Vogue', it's the closest thing [on the album] you can actually imagine human beings dancing to." More negative was Pitchfork's Rich Juzwiak, who dismissed the song as a "loosely structured workout that sounds like it was ripped from The Rain Tapes."

== Track listings ==
Honey Dijon remixes EP

1. "I Don't Search I Find" (Honey Dijon remix) – 6:58
2. "I Don't Search I Find" (Honey Dijon Clubmix) – 6:07
3. "I Don't Search I Find" (Honey Dijon Radiomix) – 5:22

Remixes EP

1. "I Don't Search I Find" (Endor remix) – 5:29
2. "I Don't Search I Find" (DJLW remix) – 4:29
3. "I Don't Search I Find" (Kue remix) – 6:25
4. "I Don't Search I Find" (Chris Cox remix) – 6:53
5. "I Don't Search I Find" (Offer Nissim remix) – 6:38

== Credits and personnel ==
- Madonna – writer, vocals, producer
- Mirwais – writer, producer

Credits and personnel adapted from the Madame X album liner notes.

== Charts ==
Chart (2019–20)	Peak position
Greece Digital Song Sales (Billboard)	5
Slovakia Airplay (ČNS IFPI)	73
UK Singles Sales (Official Charts Company)	66
US Dance Club Songs (Billboard)	1
US Hot Dance/Electronic Songs (Billboard)	30

== Release history ==
Release dates and formats for "I Don't Search I Find"
Region	Date	Format(s)	Version	Label	Ref.
Various	December 6, 2019	Digital download; streaming	Honey Dijon remixes	Interscope	
Various	May 1, 2020	Digital download; streaming	Remixes	Interscope	
Italy	May 22, 2020	Radio airplay	Original	Universal	

== See also ==
- List of Billboard number-one dance songs of 2020
