= List of songs recorded by Madonna =

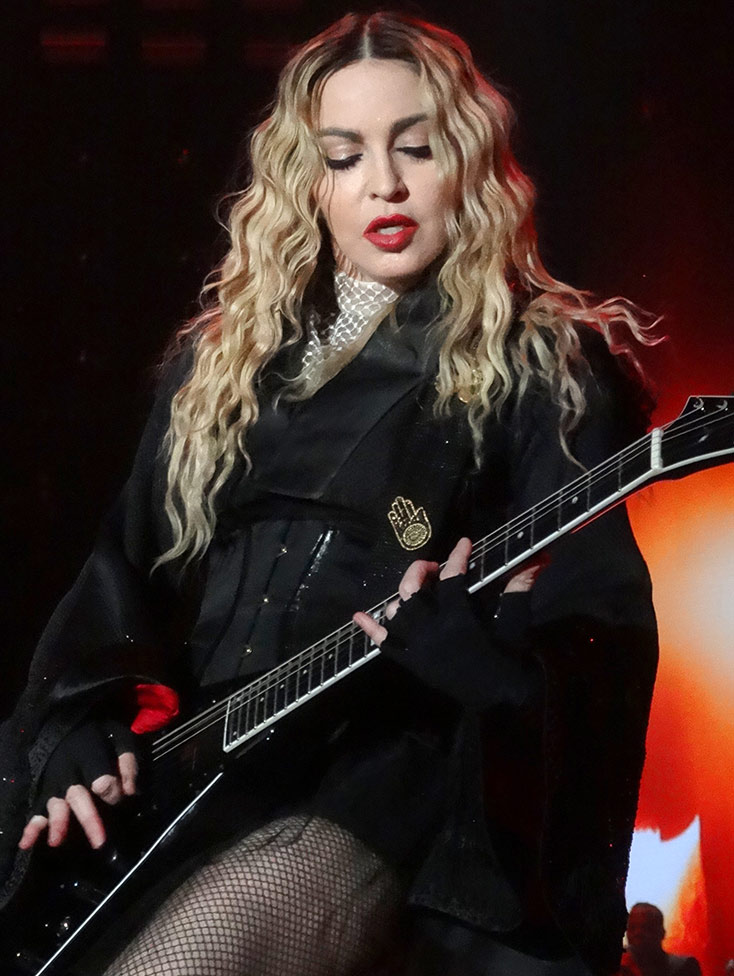
Madonna performing "Burning Up" during the Rebel Heart Tour in 2015. She is the sole songwriter of the track.

American singer and songwriter Madonna has recorded songs for fifteen studio albums and three soundtrack albums, as well as additional songs for five compilation albums and one live album. In addition, she has provided background vocals for songs recorded by other artists and has been featured on other artists' tracks.

Madonna signed with Sire Records (an auxiliary label of Warner Bros. Records) in 1982 and released her self-titled debut album the following year. Since then, she has recorded a series of successful studio albums, including the all-time bestsellers Like a Virgin (1984) and True Blue (1986), as well as the Grammy Award winners Ray of Light (1998) and Confessions on a Dance Floor (2005). Having become the sole writer of most of the songs on her debut album, Madonna collaborated with mostly one producer to write her material. Her most successful entirely self-written tracks are "Lucky Star" and "Gambler", which each reached the top five in the US and the UK, respectively. She created prolific songwriting partnerships with Patrick Leonard (chart-toppers include "Live to Tell", "La Isla Bonita", "Who's That Girl", "Like a Prayer", and "Frozen") and with Stephen Bray (chart-toppers include "Into the Groove", "True Blue", and "Express Yourself"). Producers William Orbit and Mirwais Ahmadzaï each co-wrote with Madonna on three studio albums.

Madonna has also recorded songs for film soundtracks, starting in 1985 with the single "Crazy for You", which she sang as a club singer cameo in the film Vision Quest (1985). She followed it with songs for her major film roles like Desperately Seeking Susan (1985) as well as Who's That Girl (1987). For the 1990 film Dick Tracy, Madonna recorded three songs composed by Stephen Sondheim and duetted with actors Warren Beatty and Mandy Patinkin. Madonna recorded her versions of musical numbers composed by Andrew Lloyd Webber and Tim Rice for the 1996 film Evita, along with actors Antonio Banderas and Jonathan Pryce. Her most recent song recorded for a film was "Masterpiece", which she co-wrote for her directorial venture W.E.

Other musical endeavors from Madonna includes poems she recorded for albums, like "Bittersweet" by the Persian poet Rumi, read for contemporary spiritualist Deepak Chopra's album, A Gift Of Love: Music inspired by the Love Poems of Rumi (1998). She also recorded "If You Forget Me" by Pablo Neruda, for the soundtrack of the 1994 film, Il Postino: The Postman. Madonna's recorded music encompasses providing background vocals for other artists like Patrick Hernandez, John Benitez, Nick Kamen, Nick Scotti and Donna De Lory. She also recorded collaborations with other performers, including Ricky Martin, Britney Spears, Annie Lennox, Nicki Minaj, M.I.A., Justin Timberlake and Timbaland.

== Songs ==
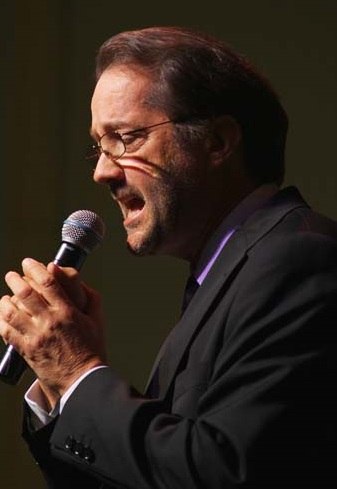
Tom Kelly wrote "Like a Virgin" with Billy Steinberg.

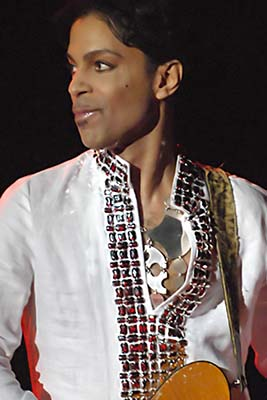
Prince appeared on "Love Song" from Like a Prayer.

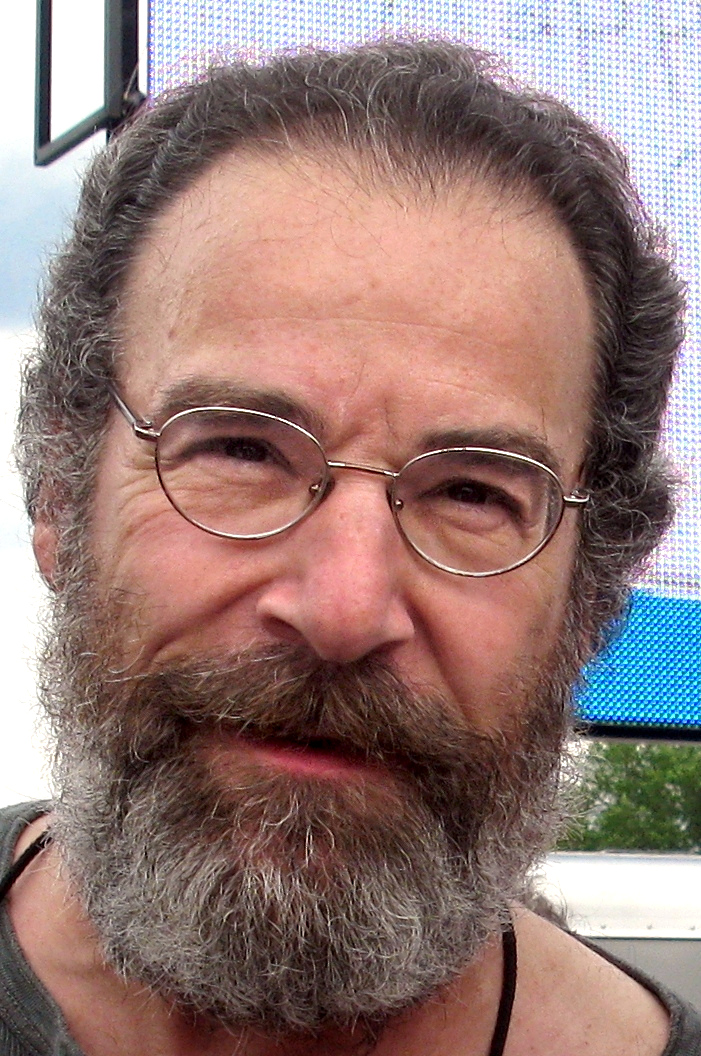
Actor Mandy Patinkin recorded songs with Madonna for the soundtrack album, I'm Breathless.

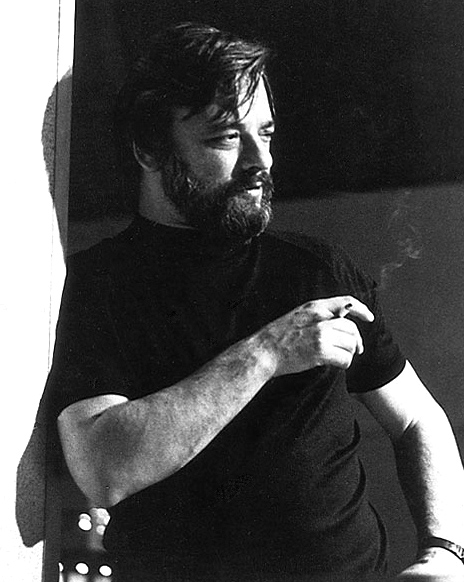
Stephen Sondheim wrote three songs on I'm Breathless: "Sooner or Later", "More", and "What Can You Lose".

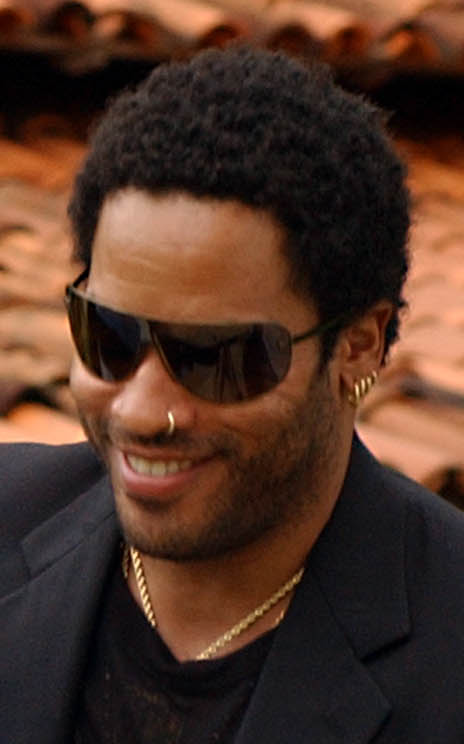
Lenny Kravitz was one of the co-writers on "Justify My Love". He was sued by Ingrid Chavez because her work on the song was uncredited. The matter was settled out-of-court with Chavez gaining a co-writer credit.

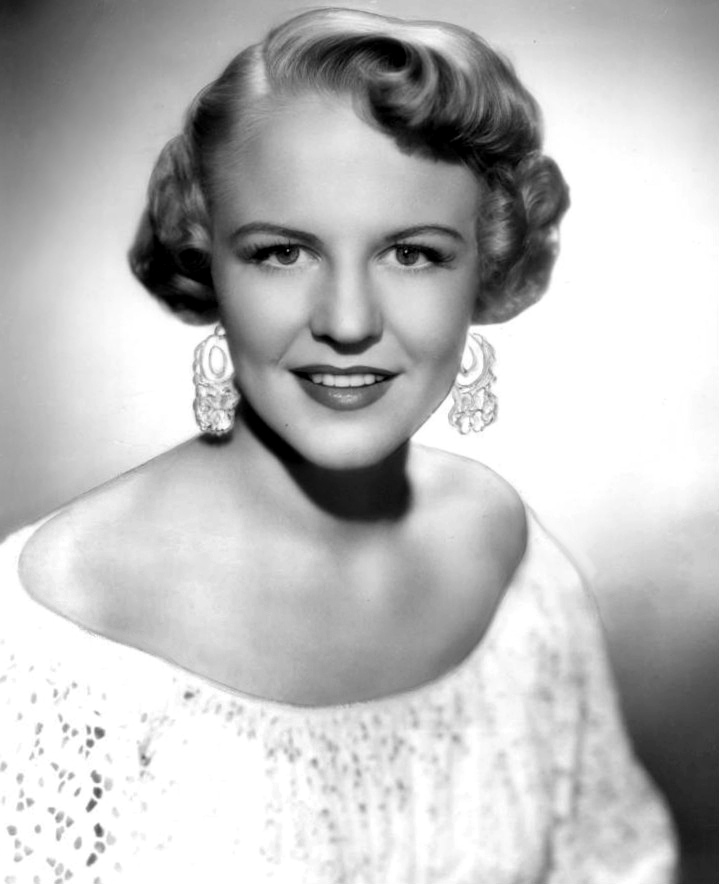
"Fever" features uncredited lyrics by singer Peggy Lee.

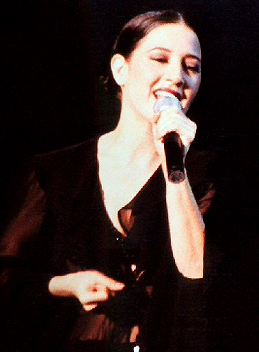
Madonna recorded background vocals for Donna De Lory's debut single, "Just a Dream".

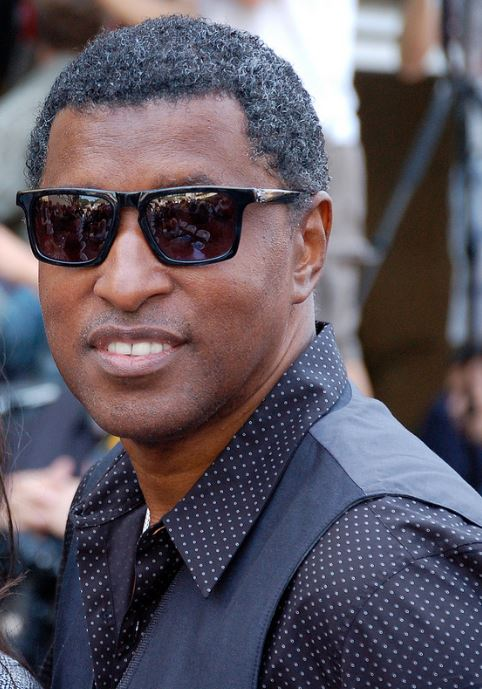
Babyface co-wrote "Forbidden Love" and "Take a Bow" from Bedtime Stories.

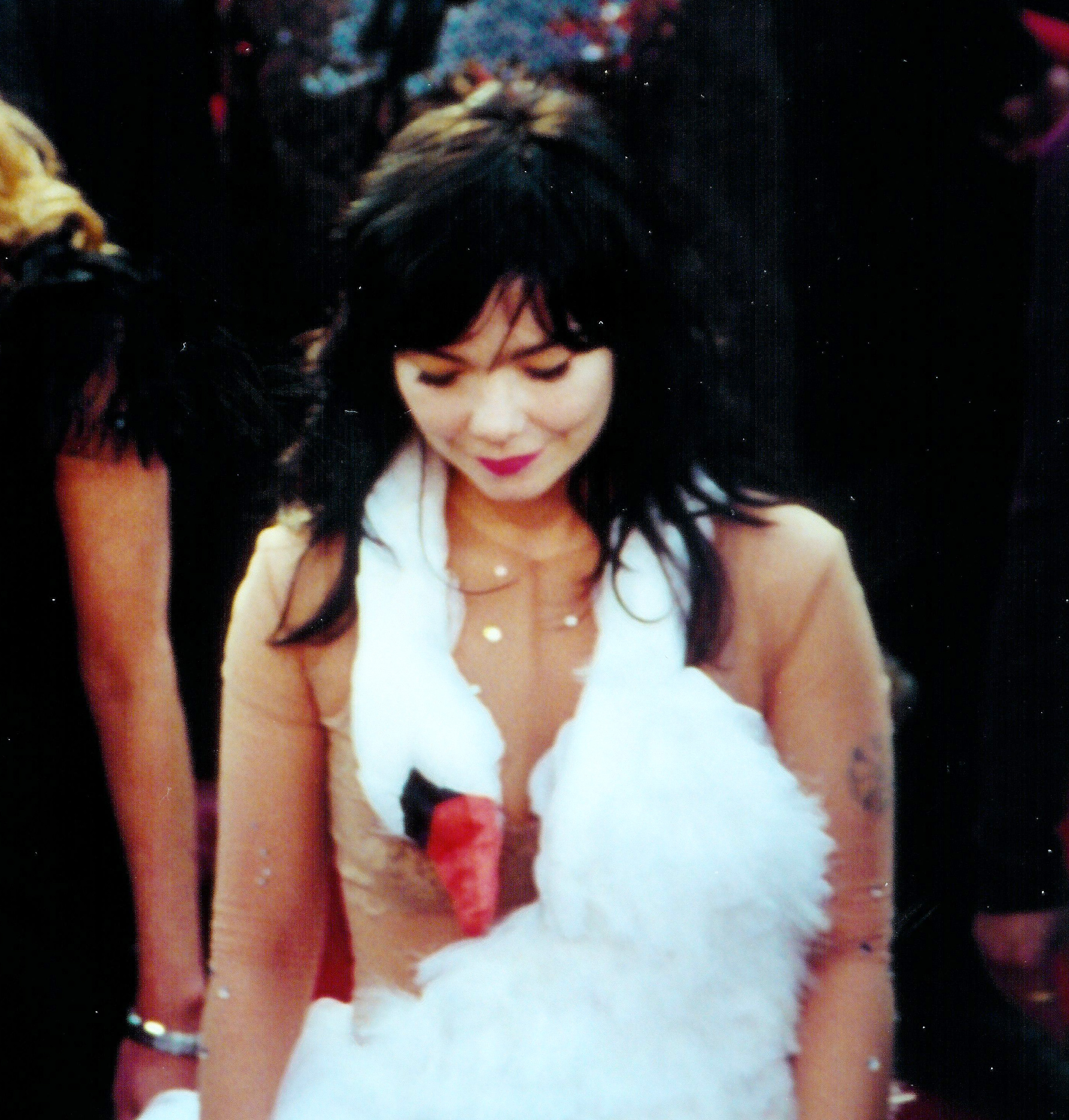
Björk co-wrote the track "Bedtime Story" from Bedtime Stories.

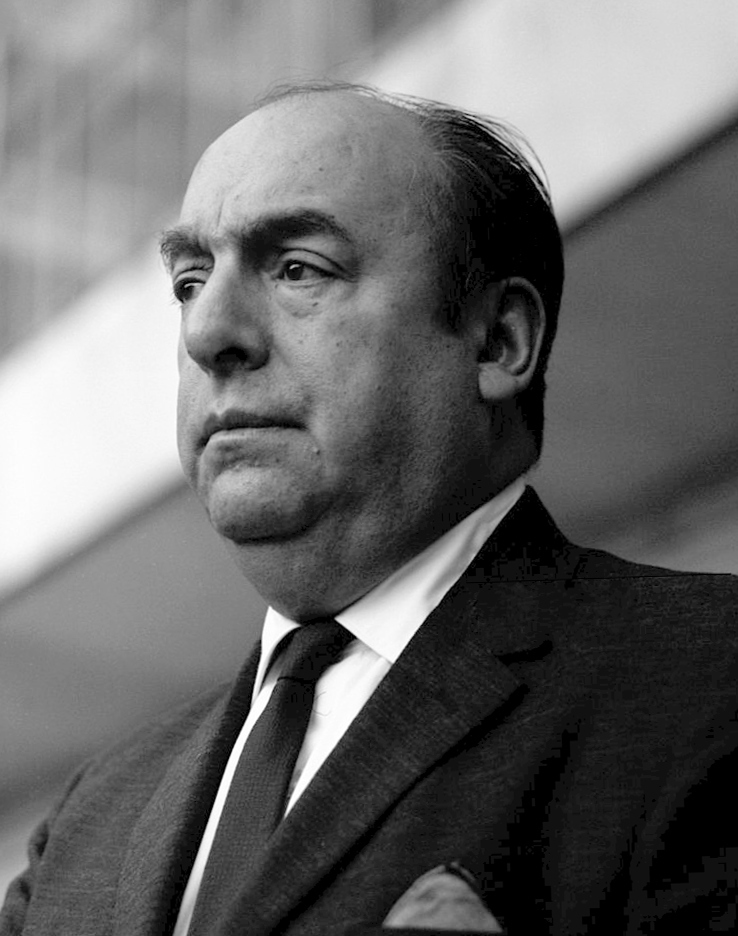
Madonna read the poem "If You Forget Me" by Pablo Neruda over music for the soundtrack of the 1994 film, Il Postino: The Postman.

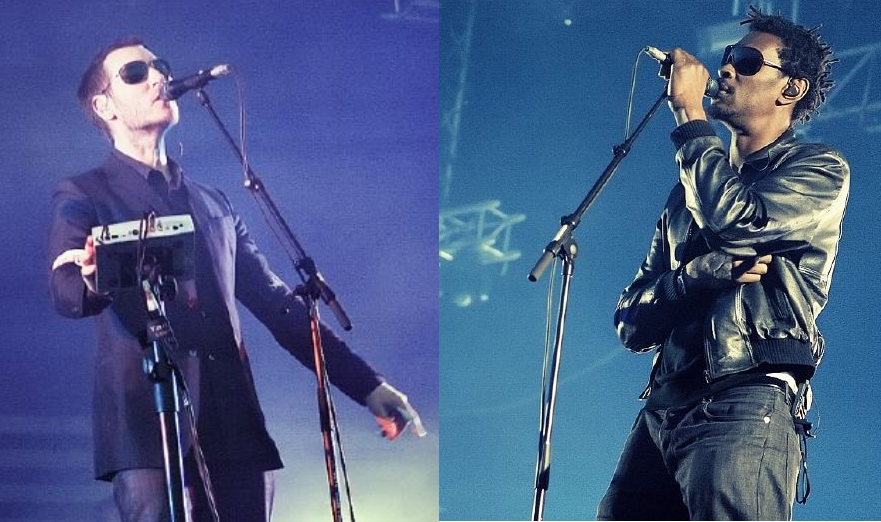
Madonna recorded a cover version of the Marvin Gaye song "I Want You" with English trip-hop group, Massive Attack

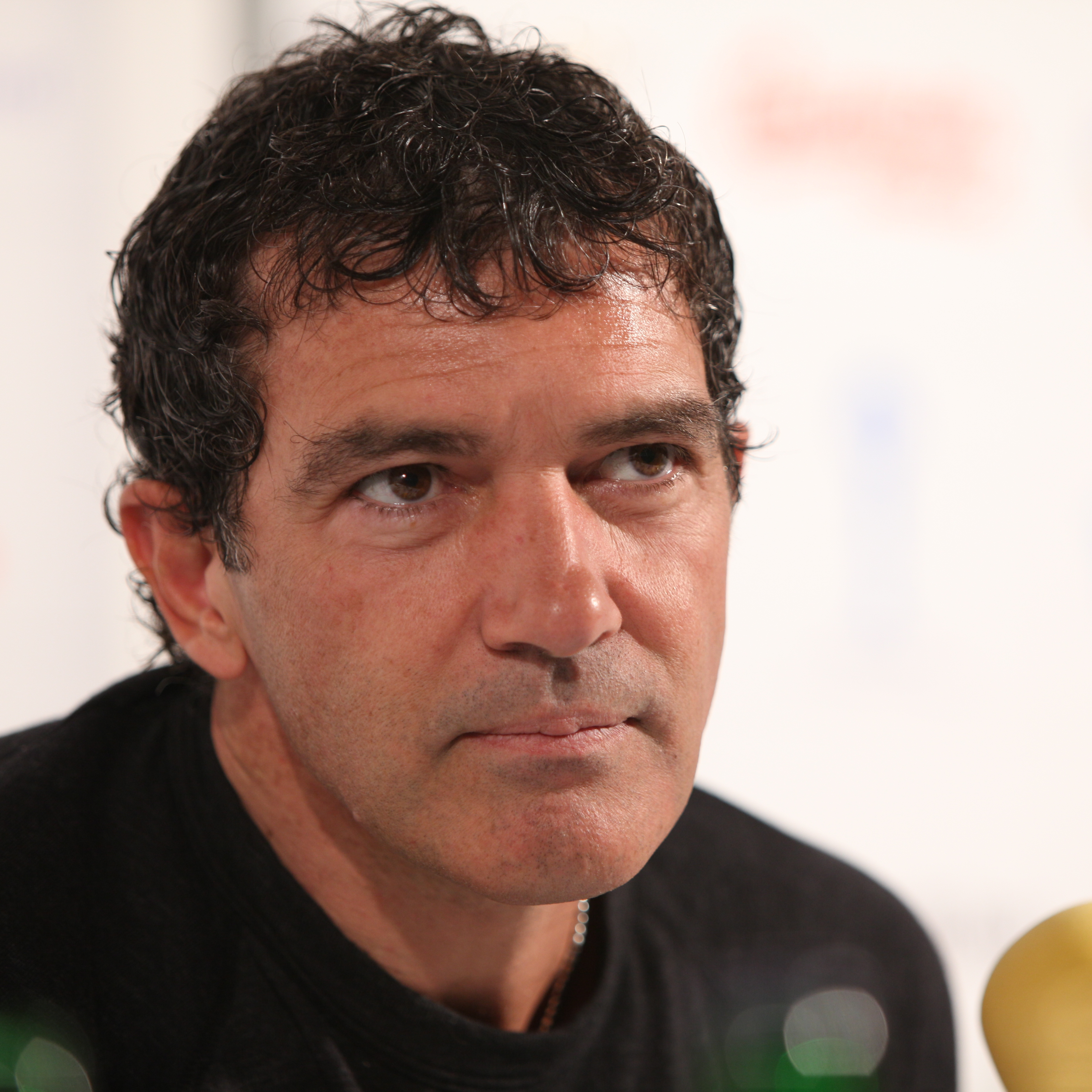
Actor Antonio Banderas recorded songs with Madonna for the soundtrack album, Evita.

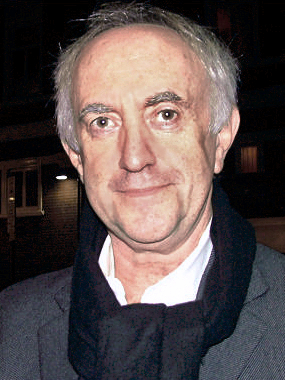
Actor Jonathan Pryce recorded songs with Madonna for the soundtrack album, Evita.

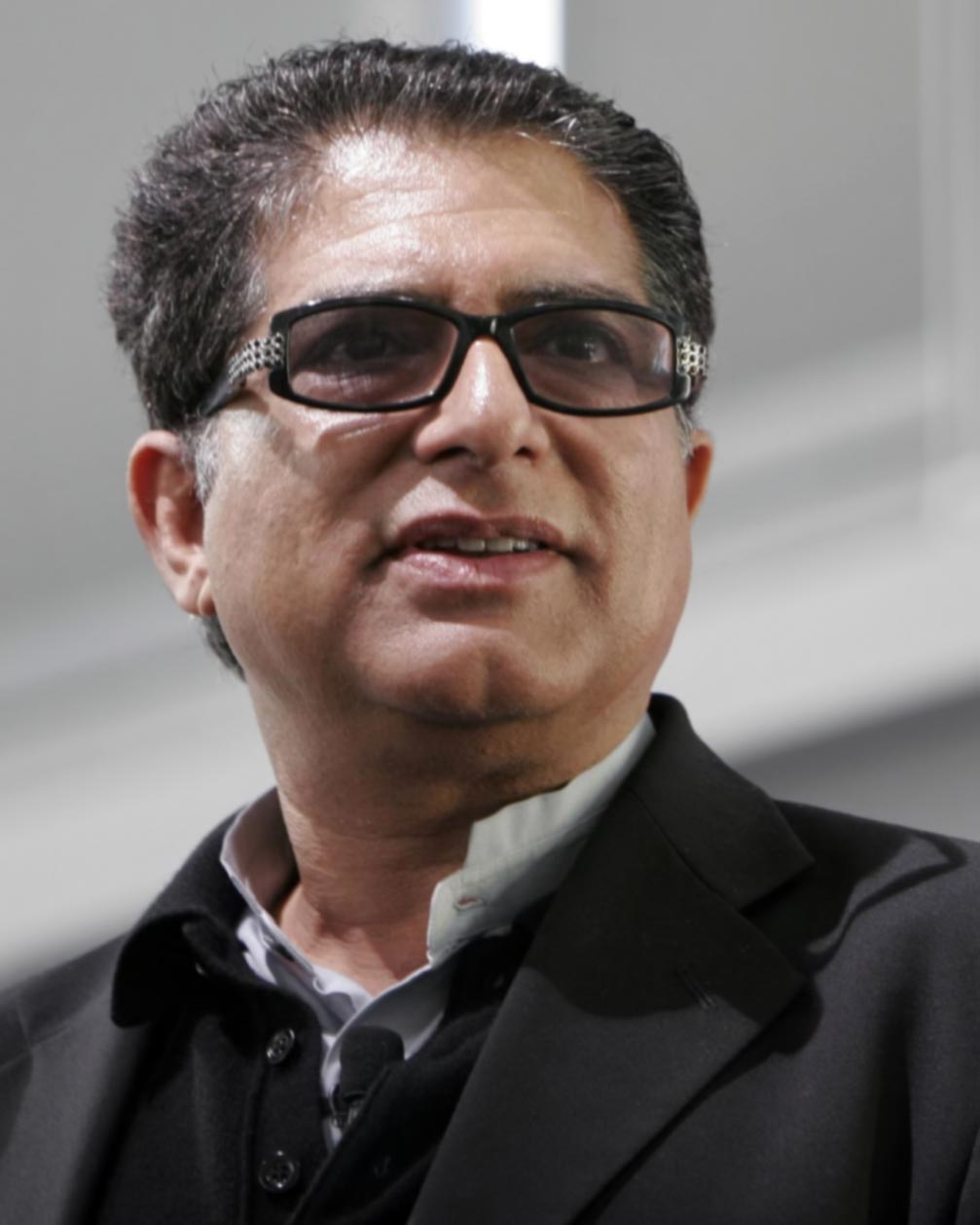
Madonna read the poem "Bittersweet" by Rumi for spiritualist Deepak Chopra's (pictured) album, A Gift Of Love: Music inspired by the Love Poems of Rumi.

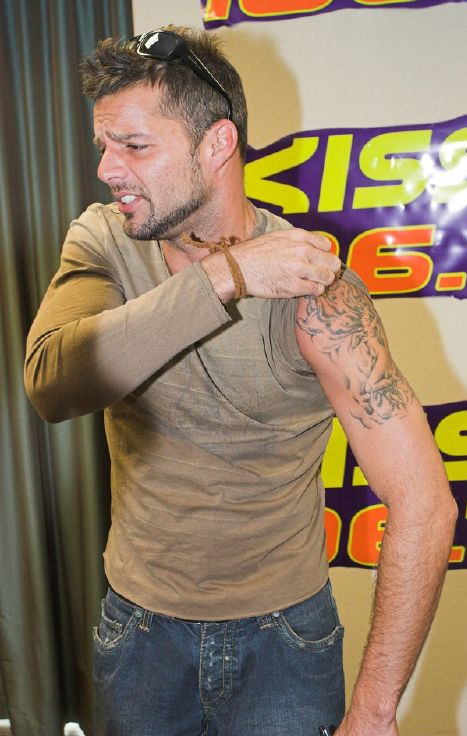
Madonna duetted with Ricky Martin on the song "Be Careful (Cuidado con mi Corazón), from his fifth studio album, Ricky Martin.

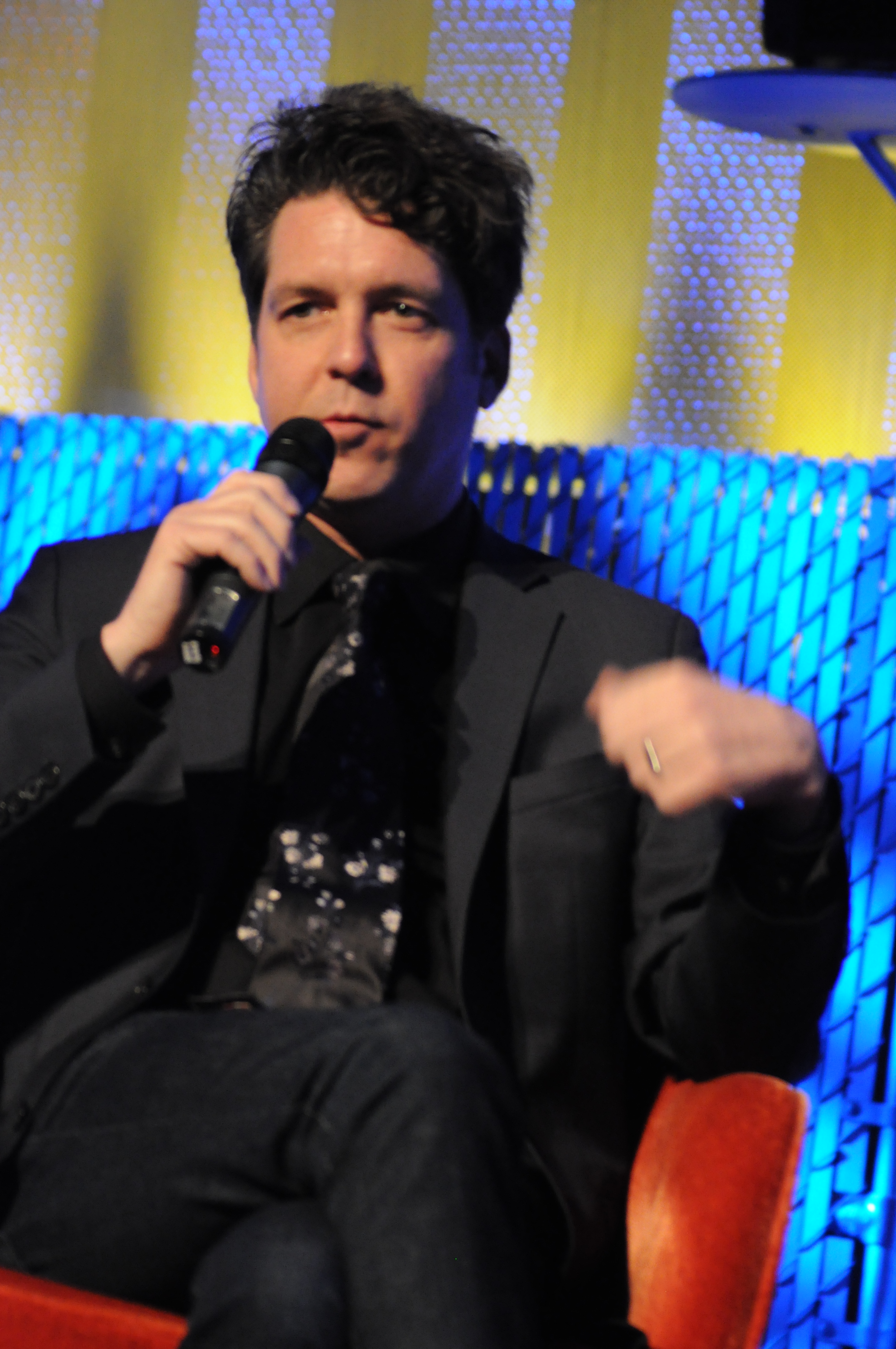
Madonna co-wrote four songs with her brother-in-law, Joe Henry, including "Don't Tell Me" from Music.

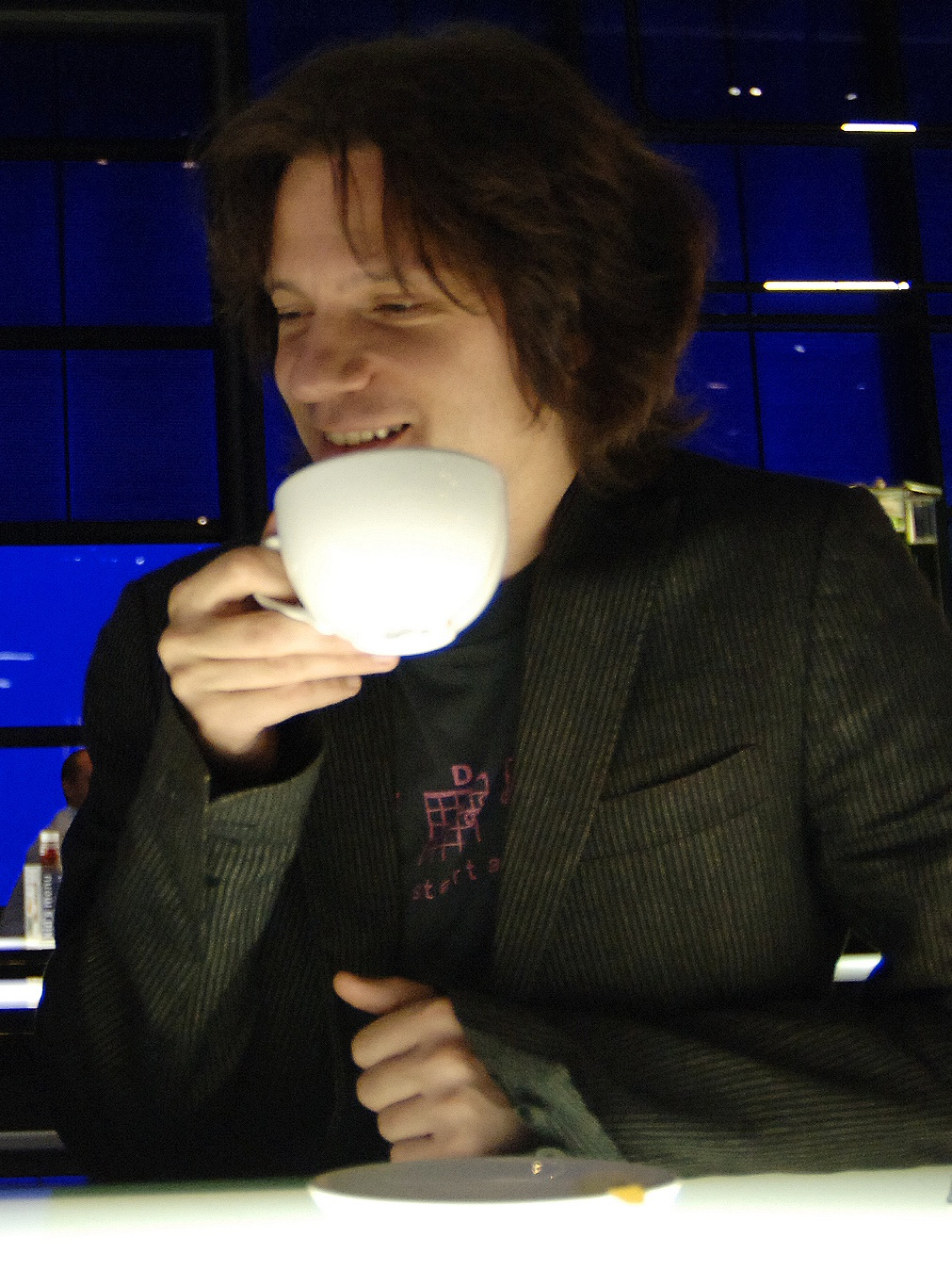
Guy Sigsworth co-wrote "What It Feels Like for a Girl" from Music and "Nothing Fails" from American Life.

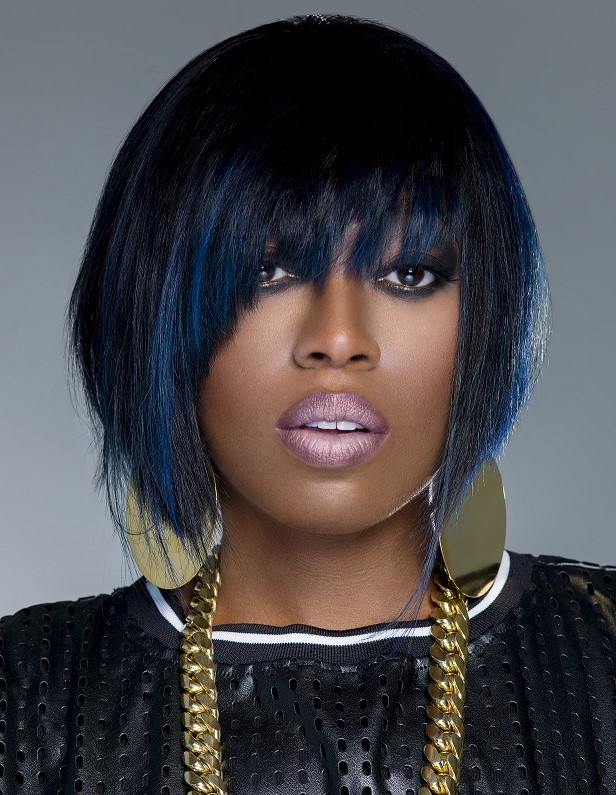
Rapper Missy Elliott appeared on the "Into the Hollywood Groove" remix, which appeared on the Remixed & Revisited album. Both Madonna and Missy Elliott appeared as featured artists on "Levitating" (The Blessed Madonna Remix) by Dua Lipa.

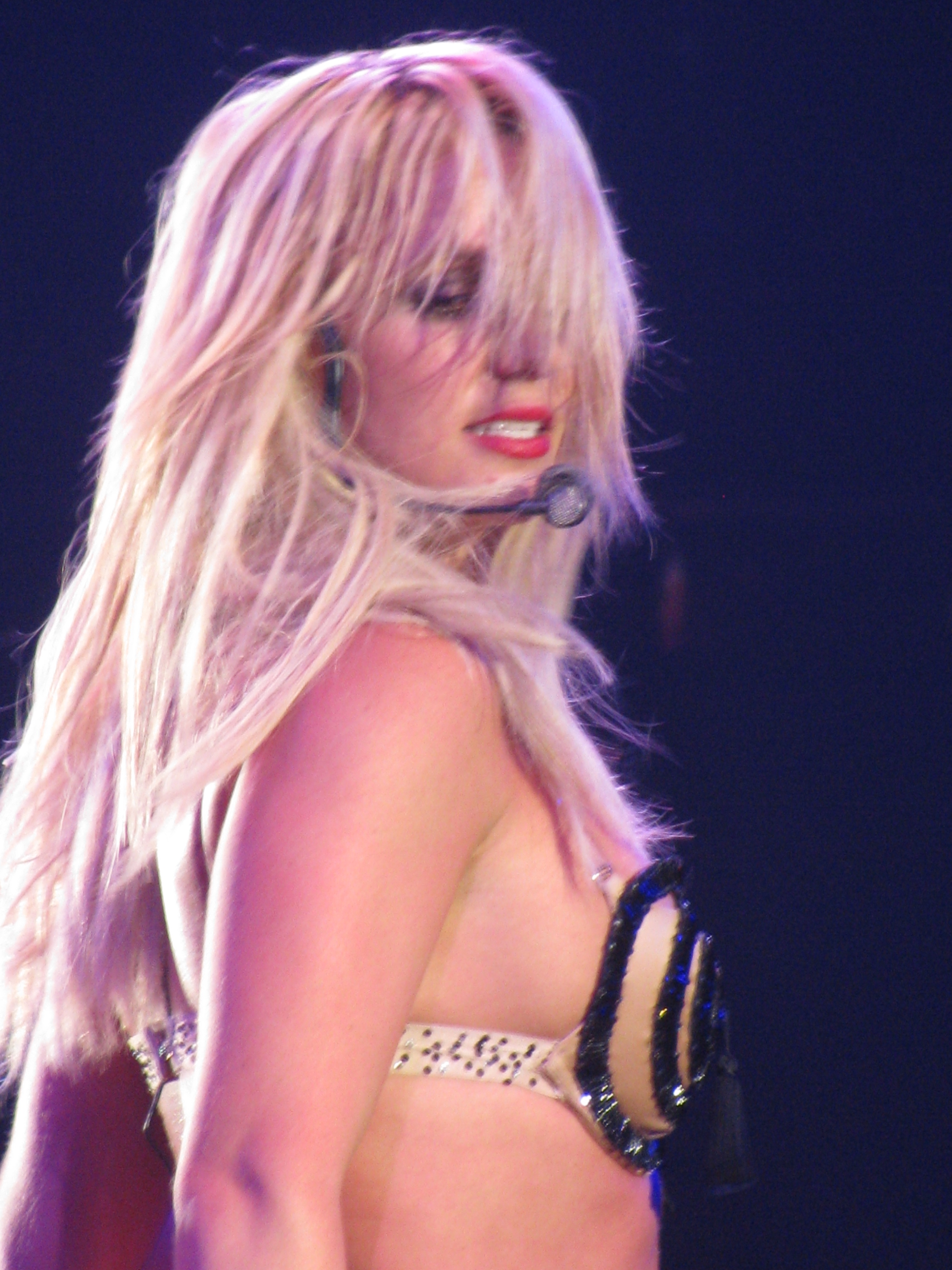
Madonna appeared as a featured artist on Britney Spears' song "Me Against the Music" from Spears' fourth studio album, In the Zone.

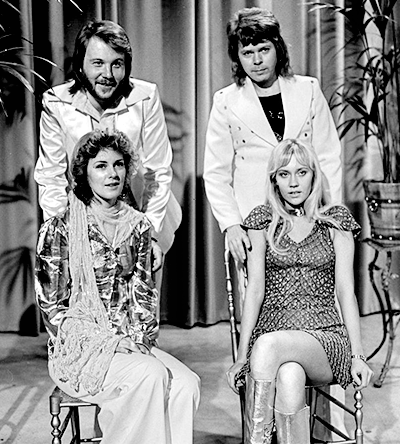
A sample from the song "Gimme! Gimme! Gimme! (A Man After Midnight)" by Swedish pop group ABBA was used in Madonna's song "Hung Up" from Confessions on a Dance Floor.

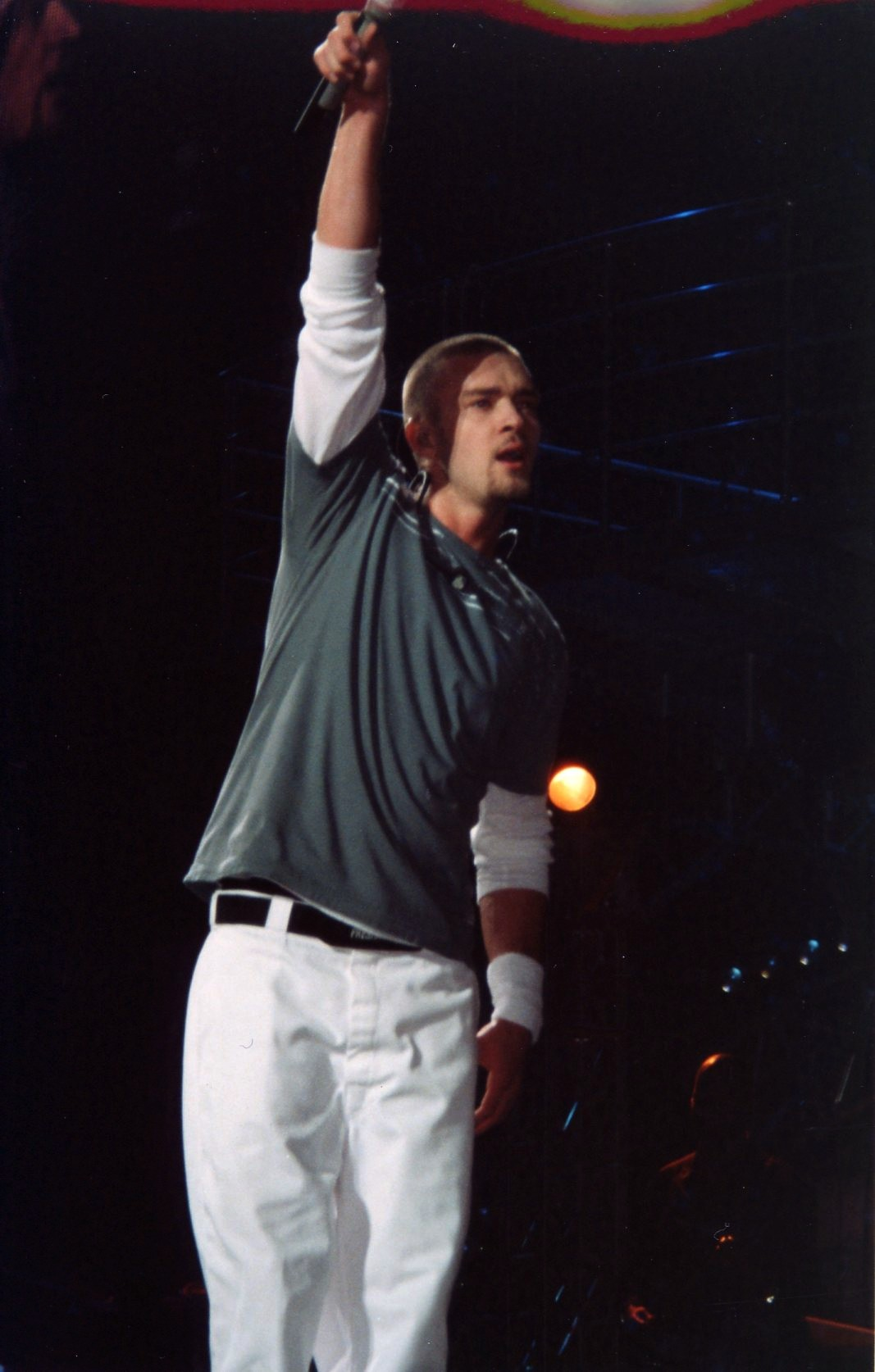
Justin Timberlake was featured on the songs "4 Minutes" and "Dance 2Night" from Hard Candy.

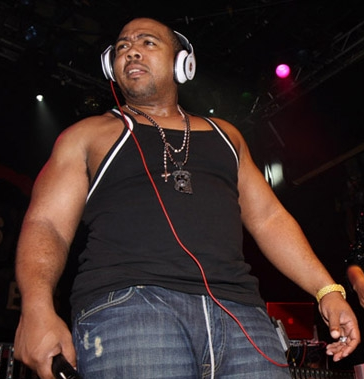
Timbaland also appeared as featured artist on "4 Minutes" and co-write many songs on Hard Candy.

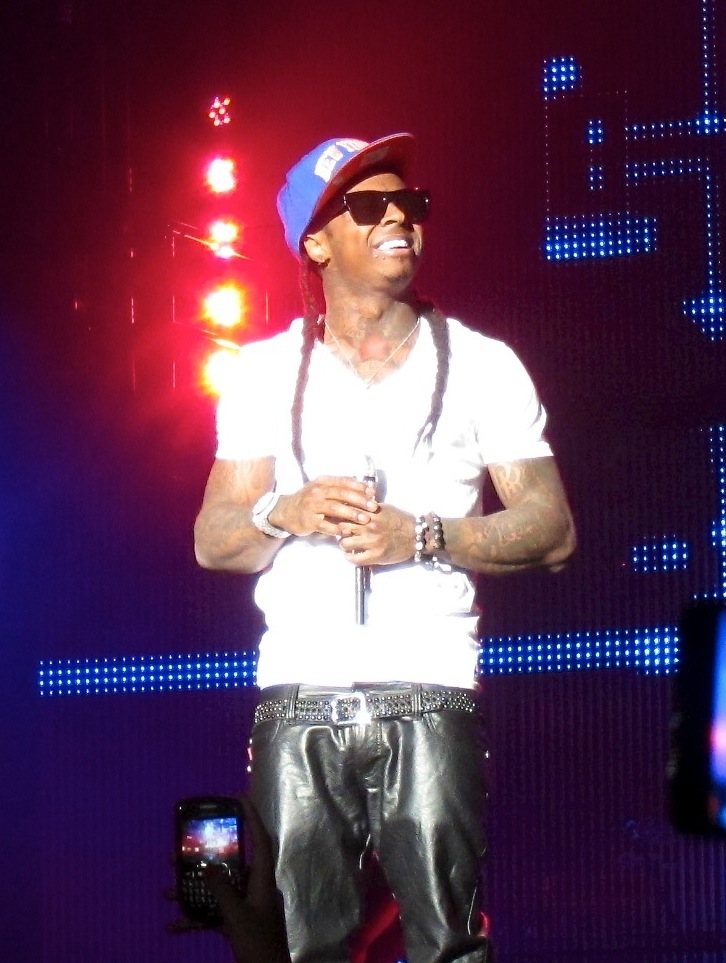
Rapper Lil Wayne collaborated with Madonna on the song "Revolver" from Celebration.

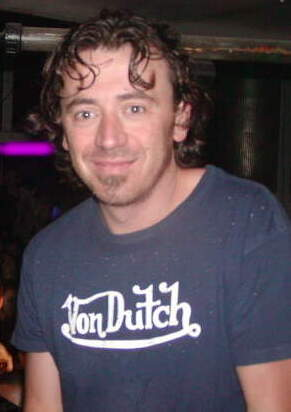
Italian producer Benny Benassi co-wrote a number of songs on MDNA.

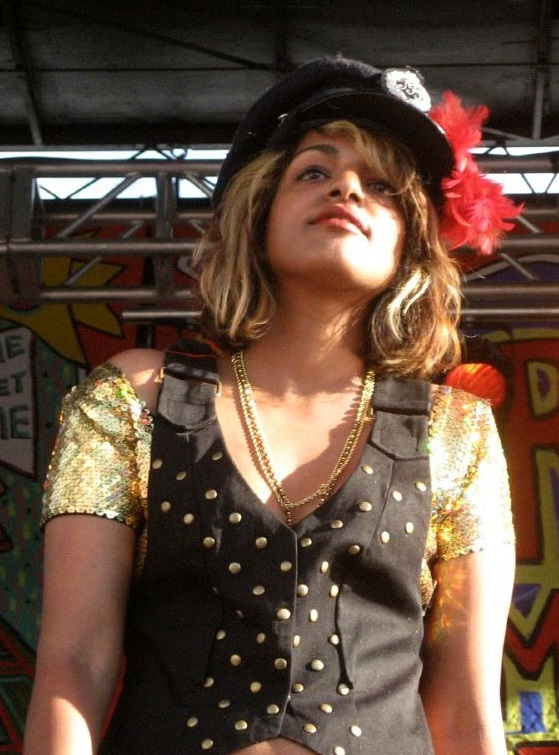
Singer M.I.A. appeared as featured artist on the tracks "B-Day Song" and "Give Me All Your Luvin'" from MDNA.

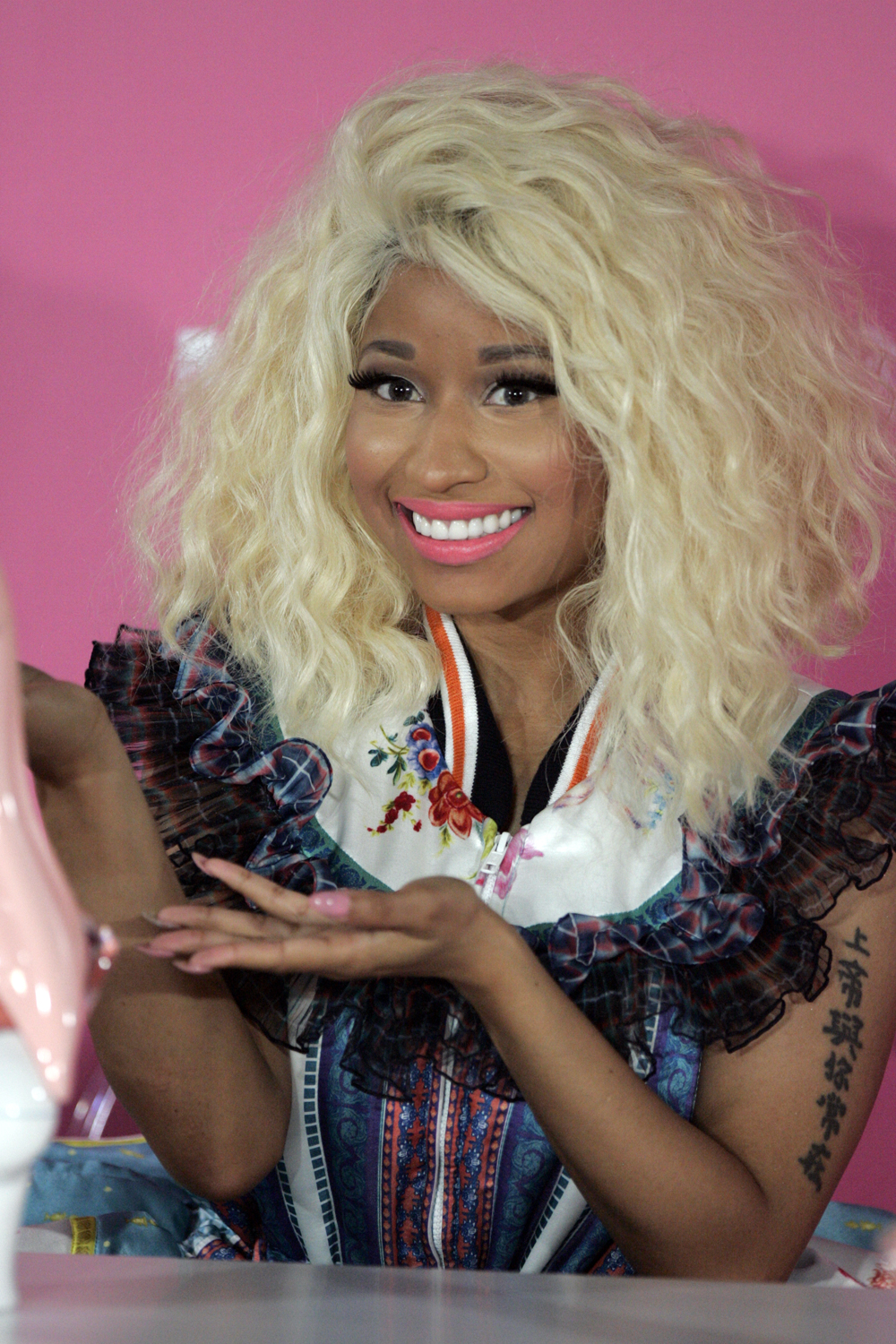
Nicki Minaj appeared on the tracks "Give Me All Your Luvin' and "I Don't Give A" from MDNA and "Bitch I'm Madonna" from Rebel Heart.

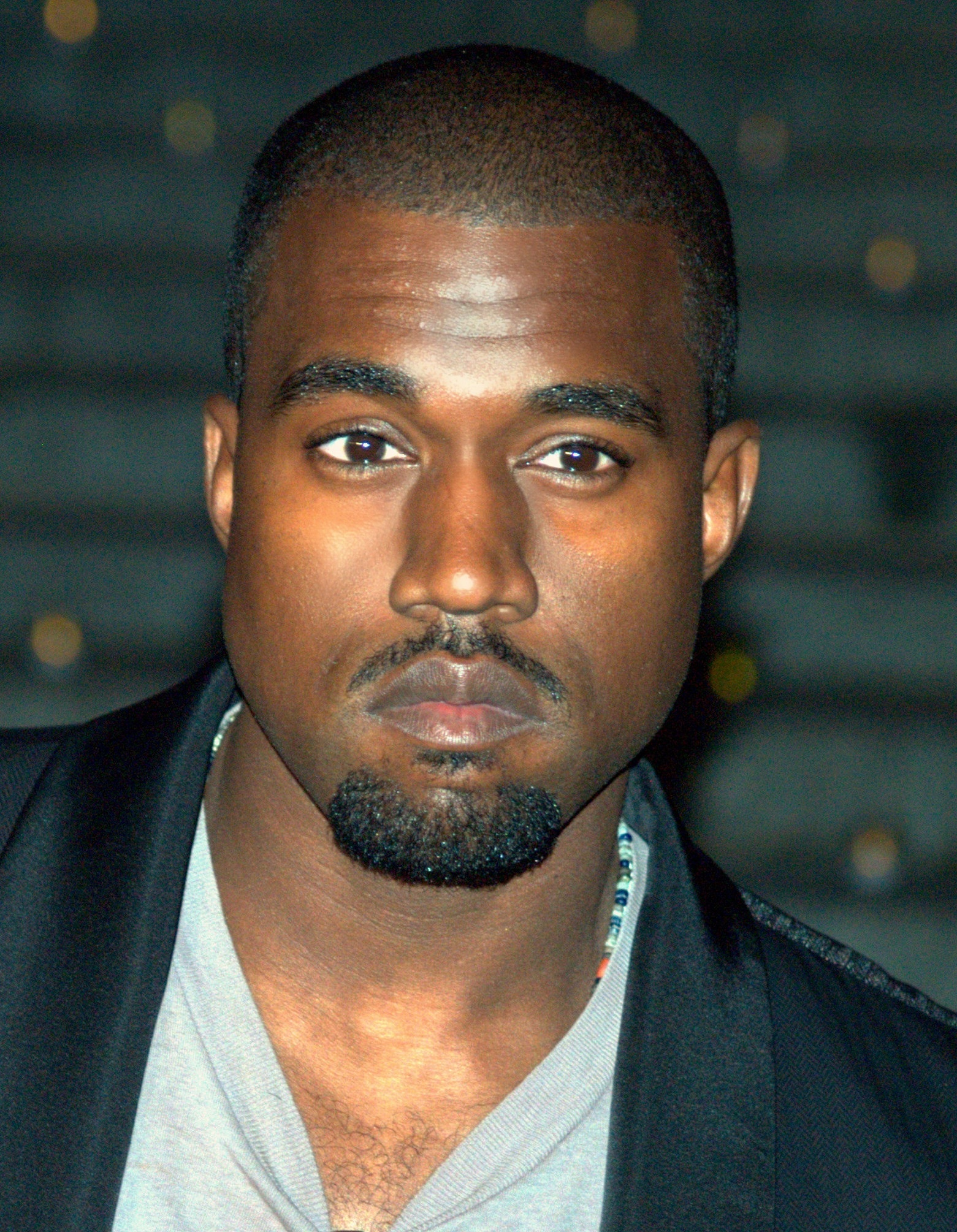
Singer Kanye West collaborated with Madonna on "Beat Goes On" from Hard Candy and wrote "Illuminati" from Rebel Heart.

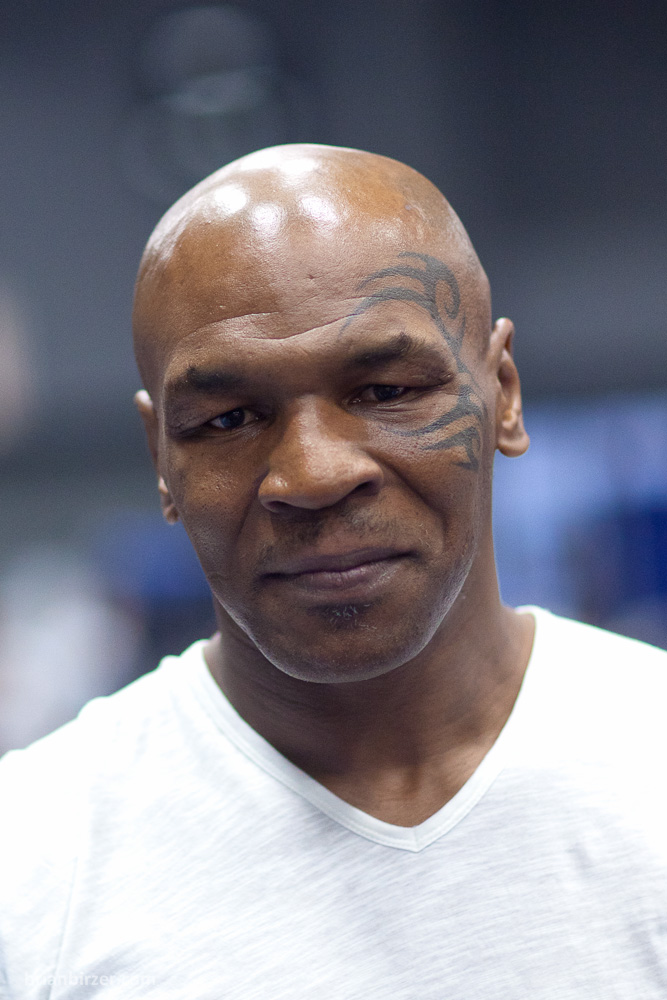
Boxer Mike Tyson was featured on "Iconic" from Rebel Heart.

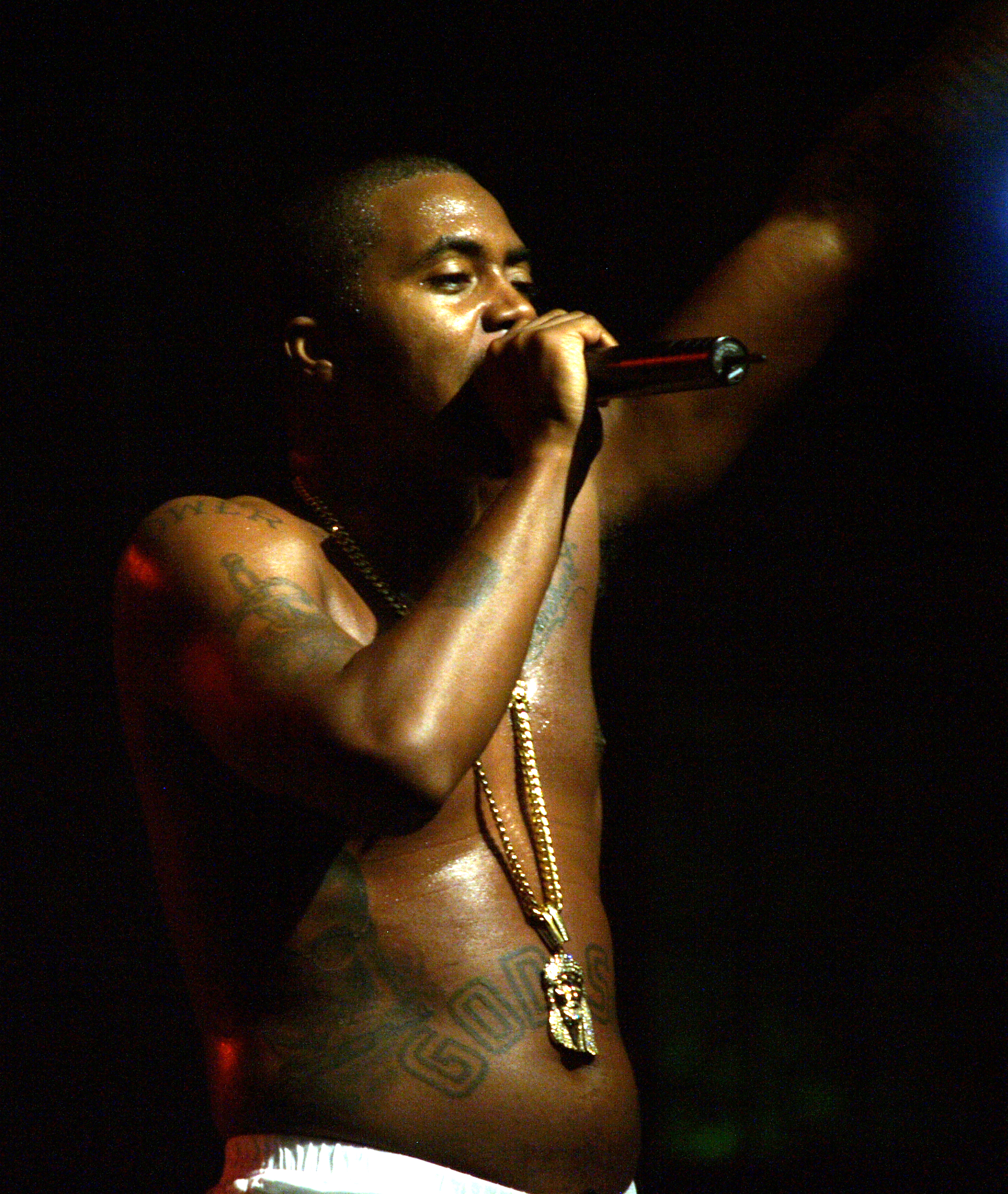
Rapper Nas appeared on "Veni Vidi Vici" from Rebel Heart.

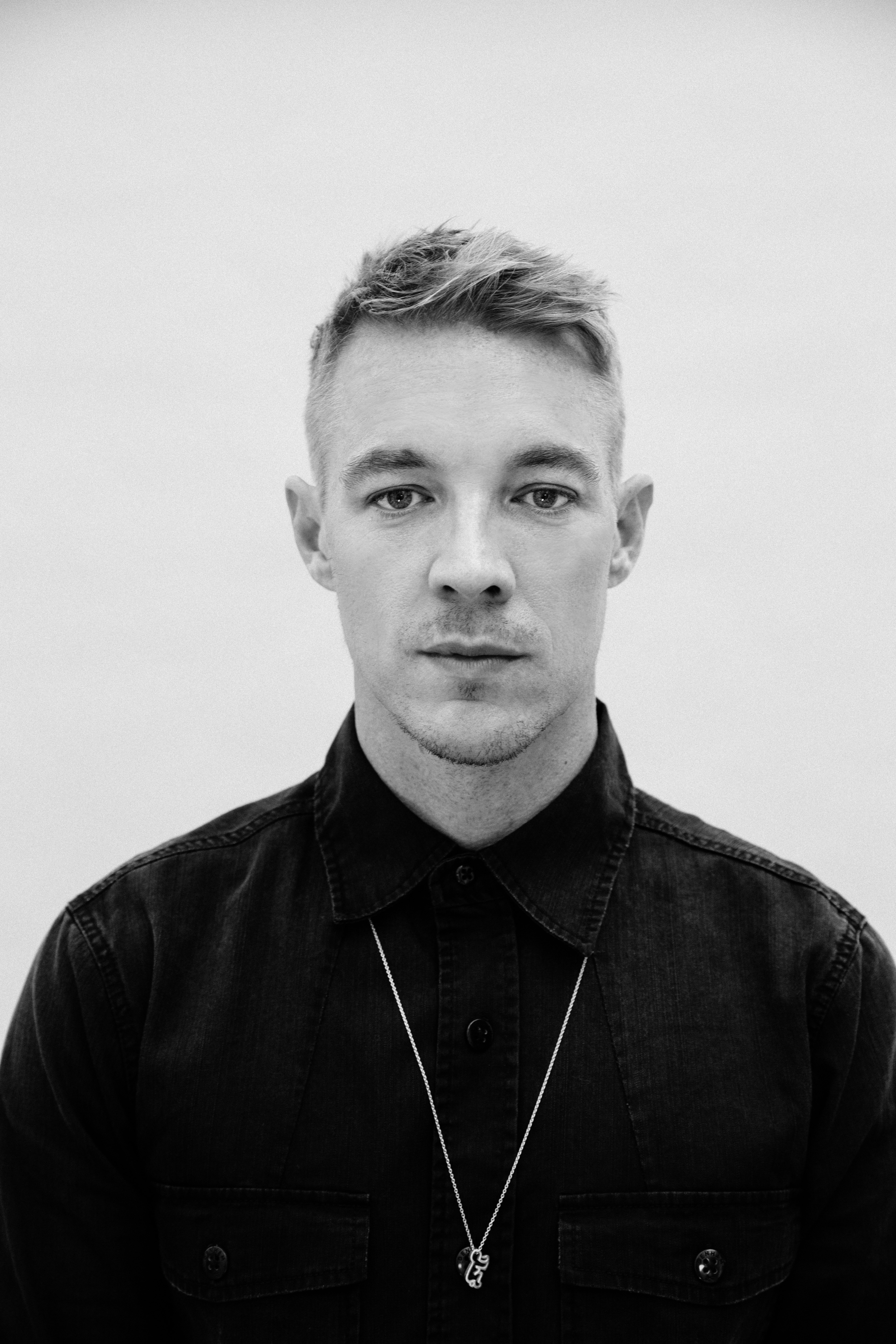
Diplo co-wrote songs on Rebel Heart with Madonna.

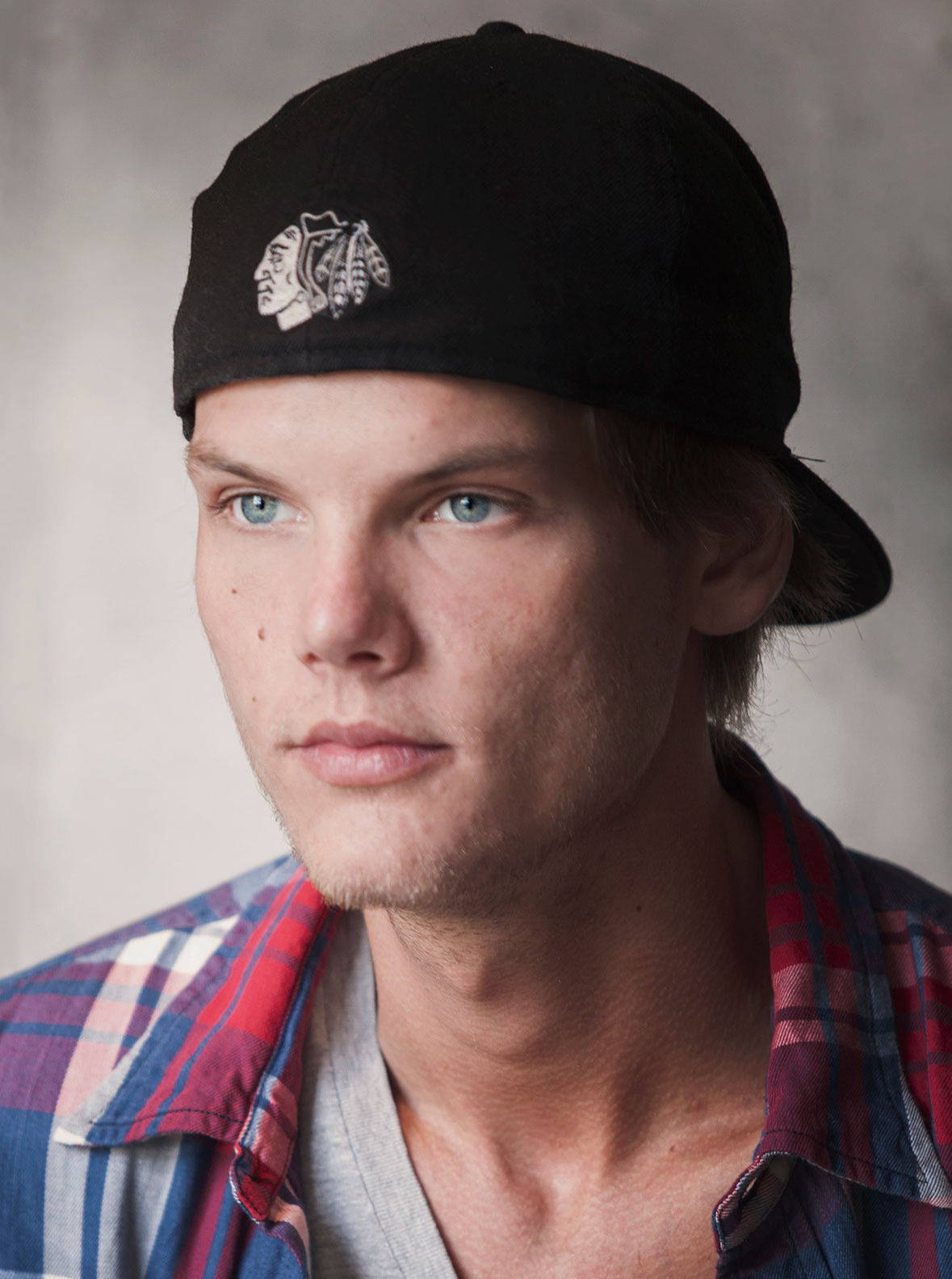
Avicii co-wrote songs on Rebel Heart with Madonna.

Key
‡	Indicates songs written solely by Madonna
•	Indicates song containing non-English lyrics
†	Indicates songs previously released by other artists
#	Indicates songs with background vocals by Madonna

Song	Performer(s)	Writer(s)	Album	Year	Ref.
"4 Minutes"	Madonna featuring Justin Timberlake and Timbaland	Madonna; Timbaland; Justin Timberlake; Nate Hills	Hard Candy	2008	
"Act of Contrition"	Madonna	Madonna; Patrick Leonard	Like a Prayer	1989	
"The Actress Hasn't Learned the Lines (You'd Like to Hear)" †	Madonna and Antonio Banderas	Tim Rice; Andrew Lloyd Webber	Evita	1996	
"Addicted"	Madonna	Madonna; Avicii; Arash Pournouri; Carl Falk; Rami Yacoub; Savan Kotecha	Rebel Heart	2015	
"Ain't No Big Deal"	Madonna	Stephen Bray	B-side to "Dress You Up"	1985	
"Amazing"	Madonna	Madonna; William Orbit	Music	2000	
"American Life"	Madonna	Madonna; Mirwais Ahmadzaï	American Life	2003	
"American Pie" †	Madonna	Don McLean	The Next Best Thing (Note: "American Pie" also appeared on the international editions of the Music album.)	2000	
"Angel"	Madonna	Madonna; Stephen Bray	Like a Virgin	1984	
"Angels Crying in My Bed"	Christine and the Queens featuring Madonna	Christine and the Queens; Mike Dean	Paranoia, Angels, True Love	2023	
"Another Suitcase in Another Hall" †	Madonna	Tim Rice; Andrew Lloyd Webber	Evita	1996	
"Auto-Tune Baby"	Madonna	Madonna; Diplo; Mike Dean; Kanye West; Charlie Heat	Rebel Heart	2015	
"B-Day Song"	Madonna featuring M.I.A.	Madonna; Martin Solveig; Maya Arulpragasam	MDNA	2012	
"Back in Business"	Madonna	Madonna; Patrick Leonard	I'm Breathless	1990	
"Back That Up to the Beat"	Madonna	Madonna; Brittany Hazzard; Pharrell Williams	Madame X	2019	
"Bad Girl"	Madonna	Madonna; Shep Pettibone; Anthony Shimkin	Erotica	1992	
"Batuka"	Madonna	Madonna; David Banda; Mirwais Ahmadzaï	Madame X	2019	
"Be Careful (Cuidado Con Mi Corazón)" •	Ricky Martin and Madonna	Madonna; William Orbit	Ricky Martin	1999	
"The Beast Within" (Note: A remix of "Justify My Love", Madonna reads excerpts from the Book of Revelation.)	Madonna	Lenny Kravitz; Ingrid Chavez (Note: Chavez sued Kravitz in July 1991, claiming that she wrote "Justify My Love" but received no credit. She received an out-of-court settlement and gained a co-writing credit.); Madonna	B-side to "Justify My Love" maxi single	1990	
"Beat Goes On"	Madonna featuring Kanye West	Pharrell Williams; Madonna; Kanye West	Hard Candy	2008	
"Beautiful Killer"	Madonna	Madonna; Martin Solveig; Michael Tordjman	MDNA	2012	
"Beautiful Scars"	Madonna	Madonna; Rick Nowels; DJ Dahi; BloodPop	Rebel Heart	2015	
"Beautiful Stranger"	Madonna	Madonna; William Orbit	Austin Powers: The Spy Who Shagged Me	1999	
"Bedtime Story"	Madonna	Nellee Hooper; Björk; Marius de Vries	Bedtime Stories	1994	
"Best Friend"	Madonna	Madonna; Alessandro "Alle" Benassi; Marco "Benny" Benassi	MDNA	2012	
"Best Night"	Madonna	Madonna; Diplo; MoZella; Toby Gad; Jimmy Napes; Andrew Swanson	Rebel Heart	2015	
"Betrayal" (Note: "Betrayal" contains an interpolation of Gnossienne No. 1, written by Erik Satie.)	Madonna	Madonna; Stuart Price; Mirwais Ahmadzaï; Erik Satie	Confessions II	2026	
"Bitch I'm Madonna" (Note: The clean version of the song is listed as "B**** I'm Madonna" (2015).)	Madonna featuring Nicki Minaj	Madonna; Diplo; Ariel Rechtshaid; MoZella; Toby Gad; Nicki Minaj; Sophie	Rebel Heart	2014	
"Bitch I'm Loca" •	Madonna featuring Maluma	Madonna; Lauren D'Elia; Maluma; Édgar Barrera; George James; Marvin Rodriguez; Stiven Rojas	Madame X	2019	
"Bittersweet" (Note: "Bittersweet" is a poem by Persian poet Rumi, set to music and read by Madonna. Contemporary spiritualist Deepak Chopra asked many celebrities, including Madonna, to read the poems for the album.)	Madonna	Rumi; Deepak Chopra	A Gift Of Love: Music inspired by the Love Poems of Rumi	1998	
"Bizarre"	Madonna and Martin Garrix	Madonna; Martin Garrix; Osrin; Wilhelm Börjesson; Upsahl; Stuart Price	Confessions II	2026	
"Body Shop"	Madonna	Madonna; Toby Gad; MoZella; Symbolyc One; DJ Dahi; BloodPop	Rebel Heart	2015	
"Borderline"	Madonna	Reggie Lucas	Madonna	1983	
"Borrowed Time"	Madonna	Madonna; Avicii; Arash Pournouri; Carl Falk; Rami Yacoub; Savan Kotecha; DJ Dahi; BloodPop	Rebel Heart	2015	
"Break My Soul" (The Queens remix)	Beyoncé and Madonna	Beyoncé; Terius Nash; Christopher Stewart; Shawn Carter; Freddie Ross; Adam Pigott; Allen George; Fred McFarlane; Madonna; Shep Pettibone	—N/a	2022	
"Breathwork" (Live) (Note: Live dance interlude which includes spoken words from "Rescue Me")	Madonna	Madonna; Shep Pettibone	Madame X: Music from the Theater Xperience	2021	
"Bring Your Love" (Note: "Bring Your Love" contains an interpolation of "Good Life" (1988), written by Roy Holman, Shanna Jackson and Kevin Saunderson.)	Madonna and Sabrina Carpenter	Madonna; Stuart Price; Roy Holman; Shanna Jackson; Kevin Saunderson	Confessions II	2026	
"Broken"	Madonna	Madonna; Paul Oakenfold; Ian Green; Ciaran Gribbin	—N/a	2012	
"Buenos Aires" †	Madonna	Tim Rice; Andrew Lloyd Webber	Evita	1996	
"Burning Up"	Madonna	Madonna ‡	Madonna	1983	
"Bye Bye Baby"	Madonna	Madonna; Shep Pettibone; Anthony Shimkin	Erotica	1992	
"Candy Perfume Girl"	Madonna	Madonna; William Orbit; Susannah Melvoin	Ray of Light	1998	
"Candy Shop"	Madonna	Pharrell Williams; Madonna	Hard Candy	2008	
"Can't Stop"	Madonna	Madonna; Stephen Bray	Who's That Girl	1987	
"Causing a Commotion" (Note: The song appears listed as "Causin' a Commotion" on the The Holiday Collection EP (1991). This version of the song is the "Silver Screen Single Mix".)	Madonna	Madonna; Stephen Bray	Who's That Girl	1987	
"Celebration"	Madonna	Madonna; Paul Oakenfold; Ian Green; Ciaran Gribbin	Celebration	2009	
"Champagne Rosé"	Quavo featuring Madonna and Cardi B	Quavo; Madonna; Cardi B Murda Beatz; Rasool Diaz	Quavo Huncho	2018	
"Charity Concert / The Art of the Possible" †	Jimmy Nail, Jonathan Pryce, Antonio Banderas and Madonna	Tim Rice; Andrew Lloyd Webber	Evita	1996	
"Cherish"	Madonna	Madonna; Patrick Leonard	Like a Prayer	1989	
"Ciao Bella" •	Madonna	Madonna; Mirwais Ahmadzaï	Madame X	2019	
"Come Alive"	Madonna	Madonna; Jeff Bhasker; Starrah; Mike Dean	Madame X	2019	
"Confessions" (Live)	Madonna	Madonna; Patrick Leonard; Daniel "Cloud" Campos; Sofia Boutella; Leroy "Hypnosis" Barnes	The Confessions Tour	2007	
"Crave"	Madonna featuring Swae Lee	Madonna; Starrah; Swae Lee; Mike Dean	Madame X	2019	
"Crazy" •	Madonna	Madonna; Jason Evigan; Starrah; Mike Dean	Madame X	2019	
"Crazy for You"	Madonna	John Bettis; Jon Lind	Vision Quest	1985	
"Credits" (Live)	Madonna	—N/a	The Confessions Tour	2007	
"Crimes of Passion"	Madonna	Madonna; Stephen Bray	Pre-Madonna	1997	
"Cry Baby"	Madonna	Madonna; Patrick Leonard	I'm Breathless	1990	
"Cyber-Raga" •	Madonna	Madonna; Talvin Singh	Music	2000	
"Dance 2Night"	Madonna	Madonna; Timbaland; Justin Timberlake; Hannon Lane	Hard Candy	2008	
"Danceteria" (Note: "Danceteria" and "Danceteria Afterhours" contain an interpolation of "Walk on the Wild Side" (1973), written by Lou Reed.)	Madonna	Madonna; Andrew Watt; Cirkut; Jeremiah Patrick Lordan; Stuart Price; Lou Reed	Confessions II	2026	
"Danceteria Afterhours" (Note: "Danceteria Afterhours" is a remix of "Danceteria" with additional lyrics.)	Madonna and Charli XCX	Madonna; Andrew Watt; Charli XCX; Cirkut; Jeremiah Patrick Lordan; Stuart Price; Lou Reed	—N/a	2026	
"Dark Ballet"	Madonna	Madonna; Mirwais Ahmadzaï	Madame X	2019	
"Dear Jessie"	Madonna	Madonna; Patrick Leonard	Like a Prayer	1989	
"Deeper and Deeper"	Madonna	Madonna; Shep Pettibone; Anthony Shimkin	Erotica	1992	
"Devil Pray"	Madonna	Madonna; Avicii; Arash Pournouri; Carl Falk; Rami Yacoub; Savan Kotecha; DJ Dahi; BloodPop	Rebel Heart	2014	
"Devil Wouldn't Recognise You"	Madonna	Madonna; Timbaland; Justin Timberlake; Nate Hills; Joe Henry	Hard Candy	2008	
"Did You Do It?"	Madonna featuring Mark Goodman and Dave Murphy	Madonna; Andre Betts	Erotica	1992	
"Die Another Day"	Madonna	Madonna; Mirwais Ahmadzaï	Die Another Day (Note: "Die Another Day" also appeared as the tenth track on the American Life album.)	2002	
"Don't Cry for Me Argentina" †	Madonna	Tim Rice; Andrew Lloyd Webber	Evita	1996	
"Don't Stop"	Madonna	Madonna; Dallas Austin; Colin Wolfe	Bedtime Stories	1994	
"Don't Tell Me"	Madonna	Madonna; Mirwais Ahmadzaï; Joe Henry	Music	2000	
"Don't Wanna Lose This Groove" (Note: "Don't Wanna Lose This Groove" is a mashup remix of "Don't Wanna Lose This Feeling" (2003), a song by Australian singer Dannii Minogue with Madonna's "Into the Groove" (1985). Madonna approved the remix mashup and the vocal sample of "Into the Groove", specifically the line "Now I know you're mine.") #	Dannii Minogue	Bruno Alexandre; Matthieu Joly; Dannii Minogue; Terry Ronald; James Theochari; Camille Troillard; Madonna; Stephen Bray	—N/a	2003	
"Don't You Know"	Madonna	Madonna; Stephen Bray	Pre-Madonna	1997	
"Dress You Up"	Madonna	Andrea LaRusso; Peggy Stanziale	Like a Virgin	1984	
"Drowned World/Substitute for Love" (Note: "Drowned World/Substitute for Love" contains a sample of the recording "Why I Follow the Tigers" performed by the San Sebastian Strings.)	Madonna	Madonna; William Orbit; Rod McKuen; Anita Kerr; David Collins	Ray of Light	1998	
"Each Time You Break My Heart" #	Nick Kamen	Madonna; Shep Pettibone	Nick Kamen	1986	
"Easy Ride"	Madonna	Madonna; Monte Pittman	American Life	2003	
"Erotica" (Note: "Erotica" contains a sample of the recording "Jungle Boogie" performed by Kool and the Gang, and the recording "El Yom 'Ulliqa 'Ala Khashaba" by Lebanese singer Fairuz. The latter inclusion led to a lawsuit which was settled out of court.) (Note: A promotional CD made available with Madonna's 1992 book, Sex, included a version titled "Erotic", which was created at the end of the Erotica album sessions and includes additional lyrics not available on the album version of the song. These lyrics were also used in the William Orbit remixes on the "Erotica" single.)	Madonna	Madonna; Shep Pettibone; Anthony Shimkin	Erotica	1992	
"Erotica Candy Shop" (Live) (Note: Live performance that contains elements from "Candy Shop, "Ashamed of Myself" and "Erotica".)	Madonna	Madonna; Pharrell Williams; Michael Kelly	MDNA World Tour	2013	
"Eva and Magaldi / Eva Beware of the City" †	Madonna, Jimmy Nail, Antonio Banderas and Julian Littman	Tim Rice; Andrew Lloyd Webber	Evita	1996	
"Eva's Final Broadcast" †	Madonna	Tim Rice; Andrew Lloyd Webber	Evita	1996	
"Everybody"	Madonna	Madonna ‡	Madonna	1982	
"Everything"	Madonna	Madonna; Stuart Price	Confessions II	2026	
"Express Yourself"	Madonna	Madonna; Stephen Bray	Like a Prayer	1989	
"Extreme Occident" •	Madonna	Madonna; Mirwais Ahmadzaï	Madame X	2019	
"Fado Pechincha" (Live) † •	Madonna featuring Gaspar Varela	João Linhares Barbosa; D. João Barnabé de Noronha	Madame X: Music from the Theater Xperience	2021	
"Falling Free"	Madonna	Madonna; Laurie Mayer; William Orbit; Joe Henry	MDNA	2012	
"Faz Gostoso" † •	Madonna featuring Anitta	Rodrigo Carmo; Duarte Nuno; Emanuel Oliveira; Mateus Seabra; Luíz Vieira; Blaya; Madonna	Madame X	2019	
"Fever" (Note: The lyrics for "Fever" includes songwriting from singer Peggy Lee, who remains uncredited for her contribution.) †	Madonna	John Davenport; Eddie Cooley	Erotica	1992	
"Fighting Spirit"	Madonna	Madonna; Mirwais Ahmadzaï	Confessions on a Dance Floor	2005	
"Forbidden Love" (Note: "Forbidden Love" contains a sample of the recording "Down Here on the Ground" performed by Grant Green.)	Madonna	Babyface; Madonna	Bedtime Stories	1994	
"Forbidden Love"	Madonna	Madonna; Stuart Price	Confessions on a Dance Floor	2005	
"Fragile"	Madonna	Madonna; Stuart Price	Confessions II	2026	
"Freedom"	Madonna	Madonna; Dallas Austin	Carnival! The Rainforest Foundation	1997	
"Frozen"	Madonna	Madonna; Patrick Leonard	Ray of Light	1998	
"Frozen on Fire" (Note: A remix of "Frozen" with a new title, re-recorded vocals by Madonna and brand new verse by DJ Sickick.)	Madonna and Sickick	Madonna; Patrick Leonard	—N/a	2022	
"Funana" •	Madonna	Madonna; Mirwais Ahmadzaï	Madame X	2019	
"Future"	Madonna featuring Quavo	Madonna; Diplo; Starrah; Clément Picard; Maxine Picard; Quavo	Madame X	2019	
"Future Lovers"	Madonna	Madonna; Mirwais Ahmadzaï	Confessions on a Dance Floor	2005	
"Gambler"	Madonna	Madonna ‡	Vision Quest	1985	
"Gang Bang"	Madonna	Madonna; William Orbit; Priscilla Hamilton; Keith Harris; Jean-Baptiste; Mika; Don Juan Demacio "Demo" Casanova; Stephen Kozmeniuk	MDNA	2012	
"Get Stupid" (Live) (Note: A live medley of "Give It 2 Me", "4 Minutes", "Voices" and "Beat Goes On.)	Madonna	Madonna; Pharrell Williams; Kanye West; Justin Timberlake; Timbaland; Danja; Hannon Lane	Sticky & Sweet Tour	2010	
"Get Together"	Madonna	Madonna; Anders Bagge; Peer Åström; Stuart Price	Confessions on a Dance Floor	2005	
"Get Over" #	Nick Scotti	Madonna; Stephen Bray	Nick Scotti	1993	
"GHV2 Megamix" (Note: Madonna's record company at the time, Maverick Records, sent this promotional megamix to radio stations on October 29, 2001 to promote the compilation album GHV2.The songs featured in the megamix are "Don't Tell Me", "Erotica", "Secret", "Frozen", "What It Feels Like for a Girl", "Take a Bow", "Deeper and Deeper", "Music" and "Ray of Light"..)	Madonna	Madonna; Mirwais Ahmadzaï; Joe Henry; Shep Pettibone; Dallas Austin; Patrick Leonard; Guy Sigsworth; Babyface; Anthony Shimkin; William Orbit; Clive Maldoon; Dave Curtiss; Christine Leach	—N/a (Note: This promotional megamix was limited to airplay, and was never released commercially nor included on GHV2, Madonna's 2001 compilation album it was used to promote.)	2001	
"Ghosttown"	Madonna	Madonna; Jason Evigan; Sean Douglas; Evan Bogart	Rebel Heart	2014	
"Girl Gone Wild"	Madonna	Madonna; Jenson Vaughan; Alessandro "Alle" Benassi; Marco "Benny" Benassi	MDNA	2012	
"Give It 2 Me"	Madonna	Pharrell Williams; Madonna	Hard Candy	2008	
"Give Me All Your Luvin'"	Madonna featuring Nicki Minaj and M.I.A.	Madonna; Martin Solveig; Nicki Minaj; M.I.A. Michael Tordjman	MDNA	2012	
"God Control"	Madonna	Madonna; Mirwais Ahmadzaï; Casey Spooner	Madame X	2019	
"Gone"	Madonna	Madonna; Damien LeGassick; Nik Young	Music	2000	
"Gone Gone Gone" (Demo)	Madonna	Madonna; Rick Nowels	Veronica Electronica	2025 (Note: Recorded in 1997–1998 for Ray of Light.)	
"Good for the Soul"	Madonna	Madonna; Stuart Price	Confessions II	2026	
"Goodbye to Innocence"	Madonna	Madonna; Shep Pettibone	Just Say Roe	1994	
"Goodnight and Thank You" †	Madonna and Antonio Banderas	Tim Rice; Andrew Lloyd Webber	Evita	1996	
"Graffiti Heart"	Madonna	Madonna; MoZella; Toby Gad; Symbolyc One	Rebel Heart	2015	
"Guilty by Association" †	Joe Henry and Madonna	Vic Chesnutt	Sweet Relief II: Gravity of the Situation	1996	
"Hanky Panky"	Madonna	Madonna; Patrick Leonard	I'm Breathless	1990	
"Has to Be"	Madonna	Madonna; Patrick Leonard; William Orbit	Ray of Light	1998	
"Heartbeat"	Madonna	Pharrell Williams; Madonna	Hard Candy	2008	
"HeartBreakCity"	Madonna	Madonna; Avicii; Arash Pournouri; Tobias Jimson; Michel Flygare; Paloma Stoecker; Salem Al Fakir; Magnus Lidehäll; Vincent Pontare	Rebel Heart	2015	
"He's a Man"	Madonna	Madonna; Patrick Leonard	I'm Breathless	1990	
"Hello and Goodbye" †	Madonna, Andrea Corr and Jonathan Pryce	Tim Rice; Andrew Lloyd Webber	Evita	1996	
"Hey You"	Madonna	Madonna ‡	—N/a (Note: "Hey You" was written for the Live Earth concerts and was released digitally as a free single. It was later included on the Live Earth digital album and CD.)	2007	
"High Flying, Adored" †	Antonio Banderas and Madonna	Tim Rice; Andrew Lloyd Webber	Evita	1996	
"History"	Madonna	Madonna; Stuart Price	B-side to "Jump"	2006	
"Hold Tight"	Madonna	Madonna; Diplo; MoZella; Toby Gad; MNEK	Rebel Heart	2015	
"Holiday"	Madonna	Curtis Hudson; Lisa Stevens	Madonna	1983	
"Hollywood"	Madonna	Madonna; Mirwais Ahmadzaï	American Life	2003	
"Holy Water"	Madonna	Madonna; Martin Kierszenbaum; Natalia Kills; Mike Dean; Kanye West; Charlie Heat	Rebel Heart	2015	
"Hot Sauce"	Madonna	Madonna; Tainy; Stuart Price; Björn Ulvaeus	Confessions II	2026	
"How High"	Madonna	Madonna; Bloodshy & Avant; Henrik Jonback	Confessions on a Dance Floor	2005	
"Human Nature" (Note: "Human Nature" contains a sample of "What You Need" performed by Main Source.)	Madonna	Madonna; Dave Hall; Shawn McKenzie; K-Cut; Mikey D	Bedtime Stories	1994	
"Hung Up" (Note: "Hung Up" contains a sample of the recording "Gimme! Gimme! Gimme! (A Man After Midnight)" performed by ABBA and written by Benny Andersson and Björn Ulvaeus.)	Madonna	Madonna; Stuart Price; Benny Andersson; Björn Ulvaeus	Confessions on a Dance Floor	2005	
"Hung Up on Tokischa" (Note: "Hung Up on Tokischa" is a remix of "Hung Up" with new vocals.)	Madonna featuring Tokischa	Mike Dean; Madonna; Stuart Price; Benny Andersson; Björn Ulvaeus; Tokischa	—N/a	2022	
"I Deserve It"	Madonna	Madonna; Mirwais Ahmadzaï	Music	2000	
"I Don't Give A"	Madonna featuring Nicki Minaj	Madonna; Martin Solveig; Nicki Minaj; Julian Jabre	MDNA	2012	
"I Don't Search I Find"	Madonna	Madonna; Mirwais Ahmadzaï	Madame X	2019	
"I Feel So Free" (Note: "I Feel So Free" contains elements from "French Kiss" (1989), written and performed by Lil Louis..)	Madonna	Madonna; Stuart Price; Lil Louis	Confessions II	2026	
"I Feel Love" (Live) †	Madonna	Donna Summer; Peter Bellotte; Giorgio Moroder	The Confessions Tour	2007	
"I Fucked Up"	Madonna	Madonna; Martin Solveig; Julien Jabre	MDNA	2012	
"I Know It"	Madonna	Madonna ‡	Madonna	1983	
"I Love New York"	Madonna	Madonna; Stuart Price	Confessions on a Dance Floor	2005	
"I Met an Angel"	Christine and the Queens featuring Madonna	Christine and the Queens; Mike Dean; Joseph Bishara; Darren King	Paranoia, Angels, True Love	2023	
"I Rise"	Madonna	Madonna; Jason Evigan; Starrah	Madame X	2019	
"I Want You" †	Madonna and Massive Attack	Leon Ware; T-Boy Ross	Something to Remember	1995	
"I'd Be Surprisingly Good for You" †	Madonna and Jonathan Pryce	Tim Rice; Andrew Lloyd Webber	Evita	1996	
"I'd Rather Be Your Lover" (Note: "I'd Rather Be Your Lover" contains a sample of the recording "It's Your Thing" performed by Lou Donaldson.)	Madonna featuring Meshell Ndegeocello	Madonna; Dave Hall; The Isley Brothers; Chris Jasper	Bedtime Stories	1994	
"I'll Remember"	Madonna	Madonna; Patrick Leonard; Richard Page	With Honors	1994	
"I'm a Sinner"	Madonna	Madonna; William Orbit; Jean-Baptiste	MDNA	2012	
"I'm Addicted"	Madonna	Madonna; Alessandro "Alle" Benassi; Marco "Benny" Benassi	MDNA	2012	
"I'm Going Bananas" •	Madonna	Michael Kernan; Andy Paley	I'm Breathless	1990	
"I'm So Stupid"	Madonna	Madonna; Mirwais Ahmadzaï	American Life	2003	
"Iconic"	Madonna featuring Chance the Rapper and Mike Tyson	Madonna; Toby Gad; MoZella; Symbolyc One; Chance the Rapper; DJ Dahi; BloodPop	Rebel Heart	2015	
"If You Forget Me" (Note: "If You Forget Me" is a poem by Pablo Neruda, read by Madonna for the soundtrack of the 1994 film, Il Postino: The Postman.)	Madonna	Pablo Neruda	Il Postino	1995	
"Illuminati"	Madonna	Madonna; MoZella; Toby Gad; Symbolyc One; Mike Dean; Kanye West; Charlie Heat; Travis Scott	Rebel Heart	2014	
"Imagine" (Live) †	Madonna	John Lennon	I'm Going to Tell You a Secret	2006	
"Impressive Instant"	Madonna	Madonna; Mirwais Ahmadzaï	Music	2000	
"In This Life"	Madonna	Madonna; Shep Pettibone	Erotica	1992	
"Incredible"	Madonna	Pharrell Williams; Madonna	Hard Candy	2008	
"Inside of Me" (Note: "Inside of Me" contains three samples: "Back and Forth" performed by Aaliyah; "Outstanding" performed by The Gap Band; "The Trials of Life" performed by Gutter Snypes.)	Madonna	Madonna; Dave Hall; Nellee Hooper	Bedtime Stories	1994	
"Inside Out"	Madonna	Madonna; Jason Evigan; Sean Douglas; Evan Bogart; Mike Dean	Rebel Heart	2015	
"Intervention"	Madonna	Madonna; Mirwais Ahmadzaï	American Life	2003	
"Into the Groove"	Madonna	Madonna; Stephen Bray	Like a Virgin	1985	
"Into the Hollywood Groove"	Madonna featuring Missy Elliott	Madonna; Mirwais Ahmadzaï; Stephen Bray	Remixed & Revisited	2003	
"Intro" (Live) (Note: Consists of "Madame X Manifesto" played over "I Don't Search I Find" (Honey Dijon Remix). There is also a segment of Madonna's Woman of the Year Award speech from the 2016 Billboard Women in Music awards.)	Madonna	Madonna; Dave Hall; Shawn McKenzie; Kevin McKenzie; Michael Deering; Mirwais Ahmadzaï; Jason Evigan; Brittany Hazzard	Madame X: Music from the Theater Xperience	2021	
"Isaac" •	Madonna	Madonna; Stuart Price	Confessions on a Dance Floor	2005	
"It's So Cool"	Madonna	Madonna; Mirwais Ahmadzaï; Monte Pittman	Celebration	2009	
"Jimmy Jimmy"	Madonna	Madonna; Stephen Bray	True Blue	1986	
"Joan of Arc"	Madonna	Madonna; Toby Gad; MoZella; Symbolyc One	Rebel Heart	2015	
"Jump"	Madonna	Madonna; Joe Henry; Stuart Price	Confessions on a Dance Floor	2005	
"Just a Dream" #	Donna De Lory	Madonna; Patrick Leonard	Donna DeLory	1992	
"Justify My Love"	Madonna	Lenny Kravitz; Ingrid Chavez; Madonna	The Immaculate Collection	1990	
"Keep It Together"	Madonna	Madonna; Stephen Bray	Like a Prayer	1989	
"Killers Who Are Partying" •	Madonna	Madonna; Mirwais Ahmadzaï	Madame X	2019	
"L.E.S. Girl"	Madonna	Madonna; Andrew Watt; Cirkut; Stuart Price	Confessions II	2026	
"La bambola" † •	Madonna	Franco Migliacci; Bruno Zambrini; Ruggero Cini	—N/a	2026	
"La Isla Bonita" •	Madonna	Madonna; Patrick Leonard; Bruce Gaitsch	True Blue	1986	
"La Vie en rose" (Live) † •	Madonna	Édith Piaf; Louiguy	Rebel Heart Tour	2017	
"Lament" †	Madonna and Antonio Banderas	Tim Rice; Andrew Lloyd Webber	Evita	1996	
"Laugh to Keep from Crying"	Madonna	Madonna; Stephen Bray	Pre-Madonna	1997	
"Let Down Your Guard"	Madonna	Madonna; Dallas Austin	B-side to "Secret"	1994	
"Let It Will Be"	Madonna	Madonna; Mirwais Ahmadzaï; Stuart Price	Confessions on a Dance Floor	2005	
"Levitating" (The Blessed Madonna Remix)	Dua Lipa featuring Madonna and Missy Elliott	Dua Lipa; Clarence Coffee Jr. Sarah Hudson; Stephen Kozmeniuk; Madonna; Missy Elliott	Club Future Nostalgia	2020	
"Lick the Light Out"	Christine and the Queens featuring Madonna	Christine and the Queens; Mike Dean; Joseph Bishara; Darren King	Paranoia, Angels, True Love	2023	
"Like a Prayer"	Madonna	Madonna; Patrick Leonard	Like a Prayer	1989	
"Like a Virgin"	Madonna	Tom Kelly; Billy Steinberg	Like a Virgin	1984	
"Like a Virgin / Hollywood Medley" (Note: Live medley performance of "Like a Virgin" and "Hollywood" on the 2003 MTV Video Music Awards with co-performers Britney Spears, Christina Aguilera and Missy Elliott.)	Madonna featuring Britney Spears, Christina Aguilera and Missy Elliott	Billy Steinberg; Tom Kelly; Madonna; Mirwais Ahmadzaï	Remixed & Revisited	2003	
"Like a Virgin Waltz" (Live) (Note: Live performance that contains elements from "Like a Virgin" and "Evgeni's Waltz".)	Madonna	Tom Kelly; Billy Steinberg; Abel Korzeniowski	MDNA World Tour	2013	
"Like It or Not"	Madonna	Madonna; Bloodshy & Avant; Henrik Jonback	Confessions on a Dance Floor	2005	
"Little Star"	Madonna	Madonna; Rick Nowels	Ray of Light	1998	
"Live to Tell"	Madonna	Madonna; Patrick Leonard	True Blue	1986	
"Living for Love"	Madonna	Madonna; Diplo; MoZella; Toby Gad; Ariel Rechtshaid	Rebel Heart	2014	
"Lo Que Siente La Mujer" (Note: "Lo Que Siente La Mujer" is the Spanish version of "What It Feels Like for a Girl", recorded and added in the Latin American version of Music.) (English: "What It Feels Like for a Girl") •	Madonna	Madonna; Guy Sigsworth; David Torn; Alberto Ferraras (Spanish translation)	Music	2000	
"Looking for Mercy"	Madonna	Madonna; Starrah; Jeff Bhasker	Madame X	2019	
"The Look of Love"	Madonna	Madonna; Patrick Leonard	Who's That Girl	1987	
"Love Don't Live Here Anymore" †	Madonna	Miles Gregory	Like a Virgin	1984	
"Love Don't Live Here Anymore" (Note: "Love Don't Live Here Anymore" was re-recorded for Something to Remember and features a different composition from the 1984 version.) remixed version †	Madonna	Miles Gregory	Something to Remember	1995	
"Love Makes the World Go Round"	Madonna	Madonna; Patrick Leonard	True Blue	1986	
"Love Profusion"	Madonna	Madonna; Mirwais Ahmadzaï	American Life	2003	
"Love Sensation"	Madonna	Madonna; Stuart Price	Confessions II	2026	
"Love Song"	Madonna featuring Prince	Madonna; Prince Rogers Nelson	Like a Prayer	1989	
"Love Spent"	Madonna	Madonna; William Orbit; Jean-Baptiste; Priscilla Hamilton; Alain Whyte; Ryan Buendia; Michael McHenry	MDNA	2012	
"Love Spent" Acoustic version re-recorded	Madonna	Madonna; William Orbit; Jean-Baptiste; Priscilla Hamilton; Alain Whyte; Ryan Buendia; Michael McHenry	MDNA	2012	
"Love Tried to Welcome Me"	Madonna	Madonna; Dave Hall	Bedtime Stories	1994	
"Love Without Words"	Madonna	Madonna; Stuart Price	Confessions II	2026	
"Love Won't Wait" (Demo)	Madonna	Madonna; Shep Pettibone	Bedtime Stories: The Untold Chapter	2025 (Note: Recorded in 1994 for Bedtime Stories.)	
"Lucky Star"	Madonna	Madonna ‡	Madonna	1983	
"Masterpiece"	Madonna	Madonna; Julie Frost; Jimmy Harry	MDNA	2012	
"Material Girl"	Madonna	Peter Brown; Robert Rans	Like a Virgin	1984	
"Material Gworrllllllll!" (Note: "Material Gworrllllllll!" is a remix of Saucy Santana's 2019 single "Material Girl".)	Madonna and Saucy Santana	Madonna; Saucy Santana; Mike Dean; Johnny Goldstein; Robert Rans; Peter Brown; Tate Kobang; Jozzy; TrellGotWings; Tre Trax	—N/a	2022	
"Me Against the Music"	Britney Spears featuring Madonna	Britney Spears; Madonna; Christopher "Tricky" Stewart; Thabiso "Tab" Nkhereanye; Penelope Magnet; Terius Nash; Gary O'Brien	In the Zone	2003	
"Medellín" •	Madonna and Maluma	Madonna; Mirwais Ahmadzaï; Maluma; Édgar Barrera	Madame X	2019	
"Mer Girl" (Note: "Mer Girl" contains elements of the recording "Space" performed by Gábor Szabó.)	Madonna	Madonna; William Orbit	Ray of Light	1998	
"Messiah"	Madonna	Madonna; Avicii; Arash Pournouri; Salem Al Fakir; Magnus Lidehäll; Vincent Pontare	Rebel Heart	2015	
"Miles Away"	Madonna	Madonna; Timbaland; Justin Timberlake; Nate Hills	Hard Candy	2008	
"More"	Madonna	Stephen Sondheim	I'm Breathless	1990	
"Mother and Father"	Madonna	Madonna; Mirwais Ahmadzaï	American Life	2003	
"Music"	Madonna	Madonna; Mirwais Ahmadzaï	Music	2000	
"Music Inferno" (Live)	Madonna	Madonna; Mirwais Ahmadzaï; Leroy Green; Tyrone Kersey	The Confessions Tour	2007	
"My Sins Are My Savior" (Note: "My Sins Are My Savior" contains elements from "My Army of Lovers" (1991), written by Ola Håkansson, Timothy Norell, Anders Hansson, Alexander Bard and Per Thyrén, and performed by Army of Lovers.)	Madonna featuring Stromae	Madonna; Stuart Price; Stromae; Alexander Bard; Lars Hakansson; Anders Hansson; Tim Norell; Per Thyrén	Confessions II	2026	
"A New Argentina" †	Madonna, Jonathan Pryce and Antonio Banderas	Tim Rice; Andrew Lloyd Webber	Evita	1996	
"Nobody Knows Me"	Madonna	Madonna; Mirwais Ahmadzaï	American Life	2003	
"Nobody's Perfect"	Madonna	Madonna; Mirwais Ahmadzaï	Music	2000	
"Nothing Fails"	Madonna	Madonna; Guy Sigsworth; Jem Griffiths	American Life	2003	
"Nothing Really Matters"	Madonna	Madonna; Patrick Leonard	Ray of Light	1998	
"Now I'm Following You" (Part I)	Madonna and Warren Beatty	Andy Paley; Jeff Lass; Ned Claflin; Jonathan Paley	I'm Breathless	1990	
"Now I'm Following You" (Part II)	Madonna and Warren Beatty	Andy Paley; Jeff Lass; Ned Claflin; Jonathan Paley	I'm Breathless	1990	
"Oh Father"	Madonna	Madonna; Patrick Leonard	Like a Prayer	1989	
"Oh What a Circus" †	Antonio Banderas and Madonna	Tim Rice; Andrew Lloyd Webber	Evita	1996	
"On the Balcony of the Casa Rosada (Part 2)" †	Madonna	Tim Rice; Andrew Lloyd Webber	Evita	1996	
"One More Chance"	Madonna	Madonna; David Foster	Something to Remember	1995	
"One Step Away"	Madonna	Madonna; Stuart Price	Confessions II	2026	
"Open Your Heart"	Madonna	Madonna; Gardner Cole; Peter Rafelson	True Blue	1986	
"Over and Over"	Madonna	Madonna; Stephen Bray	Like a Virgin	1984	
"Papa Don't Preach"	Madonna	Brian Elliot; Madonna	True Blue	1986	
"Paradise (Not for Me)"	Madonna	Madonna; Mirwais Ahmadzaï	Music (Note: "Paradise (Not for Me)" also appears on Mirwais Ahmadzaï's second studio album, Production (2000).)	2000	
"Partido Feminista" †	Madonna	Tim Rice; Andrew Lloyd Webber	Evita	1996	
"Peron's Latest Flame" †	Antonio Banderas and Madonna	Tim Rice; Andrew Lloyd Webber	Evita	1996	
"Physical Attraction"	Madonna	Reggie Lucas	Madonna	1983	
"The Power of Good-Bye"	Madonna	Madonna; Rick Nowels	Ray of Light	1998	
"Pretender"	Madonna	Madonna; Stephen Bray	Like a Virgin	1984	
"Popular"	The Weeknd, Playboi Carti and Madonna	The Weeknd; Playboi Carti; Metro Boomin; Mike Dean; Tommy Rush; Sam Levinson; Michael Walker; John Flippin	The Highlights	2023	
"Promise to Try"	Madonna	Madonna; Patrick Leonard	Like a Prayer	1989	
"Promises, Promises" (Note: Madonna performed background vocals on the Jellybean 7" and 12" mixes of this song. Although recorded in 1983, these versions of the song were not released until 2001 on the compilation album Everything and More.) #	Naked Eyes	Pete Byrne; Rob Fisher	Everything and More	2001	
"Push"	Madonna	Madonna; Stuart Price	Confessions on a Dance Floor	2005	
"Queen's English" #	Jose & Luis	Junior Vasquez; José Guiterez; Luis Camacho; Merv de Peyer	New Faces	1993	
"Rain"	Madonna	Madonna; Shep Pettibone	Erotica	1992	
"Rainbow High" †	Madonna	Tim Rice; Andrew Lloyd Webber	Evita	1996	
"Rainbow Tour" †	Antonio Banderas, Gary Brooker, Peter Polycarpou, Jonathan Pryce, Madonna and John Gower	Tim Rice; Andrew Lloyd Webber	Evita	1996	
"Ray of Light"	Madonna	Madonna; William Orbit; Clive Muldoon; Dave Curtiss; Christine Leach	Ray of Light	1998	
"Read My Lips"	Madonna and Feid	Madonna; Stuart Price; Tainy; Feid	Confessions II	2026	
"Rebel Heart"	Madonna	Madonna; Avicii; Arash Pournouri; Salem Al Fakir; Magnus Lidehäll; Vincent Pontare	Rebel Heart	2015	
"Rebel Heart Tour Intro" (Live)	Madonna	—N/a	Rebel Heart Tour	2017	
"Rescue Me"	Madonna	Madonna; Shep Pettibone	The Immaculate Collection	1990	
"Revolver"	Madonna featuring Lil Wayne	Madonna; Dwayne Carter; Justin Franks; The Jackie Boyz; Brandon Kitchen	Celebration	2009	
"Right on Time" (Demo)	Madonna	Madonna; Dallas Austin	Bedtime Stories: The Untold Chapter	2025	
"Ring My Bell"	Madonna	Pharrell Williams; Madonna	Hard Candy	2008	
"Runaway Lover"	Madonna	Madonna; William Orbit	Music	2000	
"S.E.X."	Madonna	Madonna; Toby Gad; MoZella; Symbolyc One; Mike Dean; Kanye West; Charlie Heat	Rebel Heart	2015	
"Sanctuary" (Note: "Sanctuary" contains a sample of the recording "Watermelon Man" performed by Herbie Hancock.)	Madonna	Madonna; Dallas Austin; Anne Preven; Scott Cutler; Herbie Hancock	Bedtime Stories	1994	
"Santa Baby" †	Madonna	Joan Javits; Philip Springer; Tony Springer	A Very Special Christmas	1987	
"Scheherazade" #	Peter Cetera	Peter Cetera; Patrick Leonard; Diane Nini	One More Story	1988	
"School"	Madonna	Madonna; Stuart Price; Lanita LaShonda Smith; Scott M. Carter; Mustapha M. Mbiakop; Matthew Fonson; Harloe	Confessions II	2026	
"Secret"	Madonna	Madonna; Dallas Austin	Bedtime Stories	1994	
"Secret Garden"	Madonna	Madonna; Andre Betts	Erotica	1992	
"Shanti/Ashtangi" (Note: "Shanti/Ashtangi" adapted from text by Shankaracharya, taken from the Yoga Taravali. Additional text: Traditional, Translation by Vyass Houston and Eddie Stern.) •	Madonna	Madonna; William Orbit	Ray of Light	1998	
"She's Not Me"	Madonna	Pharrell Williams; Madonna	Hard Candy	2008	
"Shoo-Bee-Doo"	Madonna	Madonna ‡	Like a Virgin	1984	
"Sidewalk Talk" #	John Benitez	Madonna ‡	Wotupski!?!	1984	
"Sing"	Annie Lennox	Annie Lennox	Songs of Mass Destruction	2007	
"Skin"	Madonna	Madonna; Patrick Leonard	Ray of Light	1998	
"Sky Fits Heaven"	Madonna	Madonna; Patrick Leonard	Ray of Light	1998	
"Sodade" (Live) † •	Madonna	Armando Zeferino Soares	Madame X: Music from the Theater Xperience	2023	
"Soltera" •	Maluma featuring Madonna	Madonna; Juan Luis Londoño; Édgar Barrera; Mike Dean; Giencarlos Rivera; Jonathan Rivera	11:11	2019	
"Some Girls"	Madonna	Madonna; William Orbit; Klas Åhlund	MDNA	2012	
"Something to Remember"	Madonna	Madonna; Patrick Leonard	I'm Breathless	1990	
"Sonata Faccile" (Note: Live at Times Square. Live track appears on disc two of Confessions II: Grindr Edition.) (Live) †	Madonna	Wolfgang Amadeus Mozart	Confessions II	2026	
"Sooner or Later" (Note: "Sooner or Later" is officially titled "Sooner or Later (I Always Get My Man)" in the film credits and Academy Awards.)	Madonna	Stephen Sondheim	I'm Breathless	1990	
"Sorry" •	Madonna	Madonna; Stuart Price	Confessions on a Dance Floor	2005	
"Spanish Eyes" (Note: "Spanish Eyes" was re-titled "Pray for Spanish Eyes" on certain editions of the album.) •	Madonna	Madonna; Patrick Leonard	Like a Prayer	1989	
"Spanish Lesson" •	Madonna	Pharrell Williams; Madonna	Hard Candy	2008	
"Spotlight"	Madonna	Madonna; Stephen Bray; Curtis Hudson	You Can Dance	1987	
"Stay"	Madonna	Madonna; Stephen Bray	Like a Virgin	1984	
"Supernatural"	Madonna	Madonna; Patrick Leonard	B-side to "Cherish"	1989	
"Superstar"	Madonna	Madonna; Hardy "Indiigo" Muanza; Michael Malih	MDNA	2012	
"Super Pop"	Madonna	Madonna; Mirwais Ahmadzaï	Confessions on a Dance Floor	2005	
"Survival"	Madonna	Madonna; Dallas Austin	Bedtime Stories	1994	
"Susan McLeod" (Live) †	Madonna	Donald MacLeod	I'm Going to Tell You a Secret	2006	
"Swim"	Madonna	Madonna; William Orbit	Ray of Light	1998	
"Take a Bow"	Madonna	Babyface; Madonna	Bedtime Stories	1994	
"Tell Me" #	Nick Kamen	David Williams; Nick Kamen; Patrick Leonard	Us	1988	
"The Test"	Madonna and Lola Leon	Madonna; Stuart Price; Lola Leon	Confessions II	2026	
"Thief of Hearts"	Madonna	Madonna; Shep Pettibone; Anthony Shimkin	Erotica	1992	
"Think of Me"	Madonna	Madonna ‡	Madonna	1983	
"This Used to Be My Playground"	Madonna	Madonna; Shep Pettibone	—N/a (Note: "This Used to Be My Playground" was written for the 1992 film, A League of Their Own. However it was not included on the film's soundtrack due to Madonna being signed on Warner Bros. Records and the soundtrack released from Columbia Records.)	1992	
"Till Death Do Us Part"	Madonna	Madonna; Patrick Leonard	Like a Prayer	1989	
"Time Stood Still"	Madonna	Madonna; William Orbit	The Next Best Thing	2000	
"To Have and Not to Hold"	Madonna	Madonna; Rick Nowels	Ray of Light	1998	
"True Blue"	Madonna	Madonna; Stephen Bray	True Blue	1986	
"Turn Up the Radio"	Madonna	Madonna; Martin Solveig; Michael Tordjman; Jade Williams	MDNA	2012	
"Unapologetic Bitch"	Madonna	Madonna; Diplo; Shelco Garcia; Bryan Orellana; MoZella; Toby Gad	Rebel Heart	2014	
"Up Down Suite"	Madonna	Madonna; Shep Pettibone	B-side to "Rain"	1993	
"Veni Vidi Vici"	Madonna featuring Nas	Madonna; Diplo; Ariel Rechtshaid; MoZella; Toby Gad; Nas; Joelistics	Rebel Heart	2015	
"Verás" (Note: "Verás" is the Spanish version of "You'll See", recorded and added in the Latin American version of Something to Remember.) •	Madonna	Madonna; David Foster; Paz Martinez (Spanish translation)	Something to Remember	1995	
"Virgin Mary" (Live) (Note: Live intro that contains elements from "Psalm 91" and "Birjina Gaztetto Bat Zegoen", arranged and performed by the Kalakan Trio.)	Madonna	—N/a	MDNA World Tour	2013	
"Voices"	Madonna	Madonna; Timbaland; Justin Timberlake; Nate Hills; Hannon Lane	Hard Candy	2008	
"Vogue"	Madonna	Madonna; Shep Pettibone	I'm Breathless	1990	
"Vulgar"	Sam Smith and Madonna	Sam Smith; Madonna; Ilya Salmanzadeh; Ryan Tedder; Omer Fedi; Cirkut; James Napier	—N/a	2023	
"Waiting"	Madonna	Madonna; Andre Betts	Erotica	1992	
"Waltz for Eva and Che" †	Madonna and Antonio Banderas	Tim Rice; Andrew Lloyd Webber	Evita	1996	
"Wash All Over Me"	Madonna	Madonna; Avicii; Arash Pournouri; Salem Al Fakir; Magnus Lidehäll; Vincent Pontare; Mike Dean; Kanye West; Charlie Heat	Rebel Heart	2015	
"Welcome to My Fado Club" (Live) (Note: Contains elements of "La Isla Bonita", "Medellín" and "Sodade".)	Madonna	Madonna; Patrick Leonard; Bruce Gaitsch	Madame X: Music from the Theater Xperience	2021	
"What Can You Lose"	Madonna and Mandy Patinkin	Stephen Sondheim	I'm Breathless	1990	
"What It Feels Like for a Girl"	Madonna	Madonna; Guy Sigsworth; David Torn	Music	2000	
"Where Life Begins"	Madonna	Madonna; Andre Betts	Erotica	1992	
"Where's the Party"	Madonna	Madonna; Stephen Bray; Patrick Leonard	True Blue	1986	
"White Heat"	Madonna	Madonna; Patrick Leonard	True Blue	1986	
"Who's That Girl"	Madonna	Madonna; Patrick Leonard	Who's That Girl	1987	
"Why's It So Hard"	Madonna	Madonna; Shep Pettibone; Anthony Shimkin	Erotica	1992	
"Words"	Madonna	Madonna; Shep Pettibone; Anthony Shimkin	Erotica	1992	
"X-Static Process"	Madonna	Madonna; Stuart Price	American Life	2003	
"You Must Love Me"	Madonna	Tim Rice; Andrew Lloyd Webber	Evita	1996	
"You'll See"	Madonna	Madonna; David Foster	Something to Remember	1995	
"Your Honesty"	Madonna	Madonna; Dallas Austin	Remixed & Revisited	2003 (Note: Recorded in 1994 for Bedtime Stories.)	
"Your Little Body's Slowly Breaking Down" †	Madonna and Jonathan Pryce	Tim Rice; Andrew Lloyd Webber	Evita	1996	
