= Pre-Madonna =

Demo album by Madonna
- Released: June 10, 1997
- Recorded: 1980–81
- Studios: The Music Building, New York City
- Genre: Pop
- Length: 47:27
- Label: Soultone
- Producers: Stephen Bray; Tony Shepperd

Pre-Madonna (titled In the Beginning in European countries) is a collection of demos by American singer Madonna. It was released in 1997 by Stephen Bray, who was the producer of the songs when they were recorded, and was distributed by Soultone. Madonna met up with Bray, her former boyfriend, in 1980 when she was trying to establish her music career. She had left the band Breakfast Club and enlisted his help to further her career. Together they started writing songs and recorded them at New York's Music Building studio. The songs recorded at that time were released in Pre-Madonna.

The album was not authorized by Madonna, however, Bray decided to release Pre-Madonna regardless, and included original demos alongside new remixes. Included were the demo versions of "Everybody" and "Burning Up" which Madonna used for her self-titled debut album. The album received mixed reviews, with some critics deeming the release as unnecessary, while others were delighted to hear Madonna's original recordings.

== Background ==
In 1979, Madonna was trying to establish her career in the music industry. She was the drummer of a band called Breakfast Club, which was headed by the Gilroy brothers, Dan and Ed. After their lead female vocalist left, Madonna was given the role of the lead female singer. However, she wanted to be the only female voice of the band, and opposed against the introduction of another female vocalist, Angie Smith. This led to a dispute between Dan and her, which resulted in Madonna leaving the band. She then formed a new band called Madonna and The Sky, but that also faced a major problem within a few weeks when its principal drummer Mike Shenoy, who had a full-time job and a fiancé, decided to leave the band.

Undaunted by Shenoy's departure, Madonna partnered up with her Michigan boyfriend Stephen Bray. Bray and Madonna had met at the University of Michigan in 1976, where he was working as a waiter in a club at Ann Arbor. Bray used to take Madonna on the tours of his band; after their romance ended, they remained good friends. When Madonna telephoned Bray to come and join the band, he immediately accepted and joined as the drummer replacing Shenoy. Madonna's main focus now was to become a professional singer, and she asked Bray to help her achieve that. Together they started writing songs and recorded them under Gotham Records, in New York's rehearsal studio called the Music Building. They worked on a number of songs, with production provided by Bray: "Ain't No Big Deal", "Laugh to Keep from Crying", "Crimes of Passion", "Don't You Know", and "Stay", along with some songs that Madonna had previously written and recorded, including "Everybody" and "Burning Up". The latter two songs were accepted for Madonna's self-titled debut album in reworked versions produced by Reggie Lucas.

"Ain't No Big Deal" was released as the B-side to her singles "True Blue" and "Papa Don't Preach". "Stay" and "Don't You Know" were combined into one song, "Stay", which was included on the Like a Virgin album.

== Composition ==
"Laugh to Keep from Crying"
"Laugh to Keep from Crying" showcases Madonna's rock music roots and her early guitar skill.

Three tracks were remixed for the album which Bray produced with Tony Shepperd. The first is the track "Crimes of Passion". Bray said that there was "nothing salvagable" from the original tracks of the song, so he recreated the music. He compared the song to "Into the Groove", calling it a "prototype" of the song. Larry Flick from Billboard described "Crimes of Passion" as "disco-spiced". The other two remixed songs, "Everybody" and "Ain't No Big Deal" – both subtitled with a "97" moniker – were remixed for a more contemporary appeal. The remix of "Everybody" is significantly slower than the original, which Bray said was meant to give it a more "tropical" sound.

The remainder of the album was produced and recorded between 1980 and 1981. According to Bray, "These tracks carve the dance sound of a generation and chronicle Madonna's first musical self-definition phase." "Laugh to Keep from Crying" was the earliest track recorded on the release. It is a rock song that features Madonna playing the guitar. AllMusic compared her sound on the song to that of The Pretenders. Aside from the remixes, "Burning Up" was the latest recording on the set, which Bray compared to works of Joan Jett and New Order.

== Release and reception ==
At the time the compilation was released, Madonna was riding a wave of publicity as a result of the film Evita and her pregnancy with daughter Lourdes. Bray said in an interview with Extra that Madonna would receive royalties for the release, and added "There's nothing in these tapes that would be embarrassing, and just hoping that she would like it as much as we do." In 1998, the album was reissued in Europe under the title In the Beginning. It features different artwork and a rearranged track list.

Pre-Madonna received mixed reviews from critics. Mark Egan from Rocky Mountain News writes that "although the songs have soul in them, it's the delivery that lacks in Madonna's voice; you just feel that something is really missing." Mark Zug from Chicago Tribune commented that "the demos on Pre-Madonna are a delight to listen to. To all the Madonna fans, this is one album worth collecting and replaying." Jasmine Temple from Lexington Herald-Leader calls the album, "a gloriously voyeuristic—and unauthorized—glimpse at Madonna's past, the woman she was then. You can actually sense the development of the icon she is today from the songs." Robin DeRosa from USA Today was disappointed with the release, saying that "it feels forced. This release is as unneeded as the hoopla surrounding Madonna's new born. Every artist has demo recordings in their early phases of career and they are generally not good. This one is not different." After Madonna was inducted into the Rock and Roll Hall of Fame in 2008, Tony Sclafani from MSNBC noted that none of Madonna's songs were in the rock music genre, "but all use rock as a jumping off point. Audible evidence of Madonna's rock roots can be found on the collection of early demos Pre-Madonna."

== Track listing ==
Pre-Madonna
No.	Title	Writer(s)	Producer(s)	Length
1.	"Laugh to Keep from Crying"	Madonna; Stephen Bray	Bray	3:50
2.	"Crimes of Passion"	Madonna; Bray	Bray; Tony Shepperd	3:43
3.	"Ain't No Big Deal" ('97 Edit)	Bray	Bray; Shepperd	4:00
4.	"Everybody" ('97)	Madonna	Bray; Shepperd	4:50
5.	"Burning Up"	Madonna	Bray	4:05
6.	"Ain't No Big Deal" ('81)	Bray	Bray	6:39
7.	"Everybody" ('81)	Madonna	Bray	4:49
8.	"Stay" ('81)	Madonna; Bray	Bray	4:21
9.	"Don't You Know"	Madonna; Bray	Bray	4:31
10.	"Ain't No Big Deal" ('97 Extended)	Bray	Bray; Shepperd	6:39
Total length:				47:27

In the Beginning
No.	Title	Writer(s)	Producer(s)	Length
1.	"Crimes of Passion"	Madonna; Stephen Bray	Bray; Tony Shepperd	3:44
2.	"Everybody" ('97)	Madonna	Bray; Shepperd	4:52
3.	"Ain't No Big Deal" ('97)	Bray	Bray; Shepperd	4:02
4.	"Laugh to Keep from Crying"	Madonna; Bray	Bray	3:51
5.	"Burning Up"	Madonna	Bray	4:06
6.	"Ain't No Big Deal" ('81)	Bray	Bray	6:41
7.	"Everybody" ('81)	Madonna	Bray	4:51
8.	"Stay" ('81)	Madonna; Bray	Bray	4:23
9.	"Don't You Know"	Madonna; Bray	Bray	4:31
Total length:				41:01

== Personnel ==
Credits and personnel adapted from In the Beginning liner notes.

- Madonna – vocals, writer, guitar, drums
- Stephen Bray – writer, producer, guitar, drums, keyboard
- Tony Shepperd – producer, mixing
- Nick Matzorkis – executive producer
- Robert Rich – executive producer
- Paul Pesco – guitar
- Jamie Muhoberac – keyboard
- Kevin Gray – audio mastering
- Viveka Davis – booklet photography
- Dr. KEB Rhythm – drum programming

== Bibliography ==
- Cross, Mary (2007), Madonna: A Biography, Greenwood Publishing Group, ISBN 978-0-313-33811-3
- Rooksby, Rikky (2004), The Complete Guide to the Music of Madonna, Omnibus Press, ISBN 0-7119-9883-3
- Taraborrelli, Randy J. (2002), Madonna: An Intimate Biography, Simon & Schuster, ISBN 978-1-4165-8346-2
