= Il Postino (soundtrack) =

Il Postino (The Postman)

Soundtrack album by Luis Enríquez Bacalov
- Released: 1995
- Length: 38:24

Professional ratings
Review scores
| Source | Rating |
|---|---|
| Allmusic | 4/5 stars |

The Postman is the soundtrack, on the Hollywood Records label, of the 1994 Academy Award-winning film The Postman (original title: Il Postino). The original score was composed by Luis Enríquez Bacalov.

Besides the film's score, composed by Bacalov, the soundtrack includes Pablo Neruda's poems recited by Sting, Miranda Richardson, Wesley Snipes, Ralph Fiennes, Ethan Hawke, Rufus Sewell, Glenn Close, Samuel L. Jackson, Andy García, Willem Dafoe, Madonna, Vincent Perez, and Julia Roberts.

The album won the Academy Award for Best Original Dramatic Score and the BAFTA Award for Best Film Music.

== Track listing ==
Poetry and Music Suite
| No. | Title | Music | Featured artist | Length |
|---|---|---|---|---|
| 1. | "Theme" | Luis Bacalov | | 1:53 |
| 2. | "Morning (Love Sonnet XXVII)" | Bacalov, Pablo Neruda | Sting | 0:52 |
| 3. | "Poetry" | Bacalov, Neruda | Miranda Richardson | 1:39 |
| 4. | "Leaning into the Afternoons..." | Bacalov, Neruda | Wesley Snipes | 1:35 |
| 5. | "Poor Fellows" | Bacalov, Neruda | Julia Roberts | 1:29 |
| 6. | "Ode To The Sea" | Bacalov, Neruda | Ralph Fiennes | 1:36 |
| 7. | "Fable of the Memaid and the Drunks" | Bacalov, Neruda | Ethan Hawke | 2:08 |
| 8. | "Ode to a Beautiful Nude" | Bacalov, Neruda | Rufus Sewell | 2:30 |
| 9. | "I Like For You To Be Still" | Bacalov, Neruda | Glenn Close | 1:33 |
| 10. | "Walking Around" | Bacalov, Neruda | Samuel L. Jackson | 3:07 |
| 11. | "Tonight I Can Write..." | Bacalov, Neruda | Andy Garcia | 2:44 |
| 12. | "Adonic Angela" | Bacalov, Neruda | Willem Dafoe | 1:21 |
| 13. | "If You Forget Me" | Bacalov, Neruda | Madonna | 2:01 |
| 14. | "Integrations" | Bacalov, Neruda | Vincent Perez | 1:33 |
| 15. | "And Now You're Mine (Love Sonnet LXXXI)" | Bacalov, Neruda | Garcia, Roberts | 3:04 |

Music from the Original Motion Picture Soundtrack
| No. | Title | Music | Featured artist | Length |
|---|---|---|---|---|
| 16. | "The Postman (Titles)" | Bacalov | | 2:41 |
| 17. | "Bicycle" | Bacalov | | 2:26 |
| 18. | "Madreselva, tango" | Luis César Amadori, Francisco Canaro | Carlos Gardel | 3:16 |
| 19. | "The Postman Lullaby" | Bacalov | | 0:50 |
| 20. | "Beatrice" | Bacalov | | 4:06 |
| 21. | "Metaphors" | Bacalov | | 2:02 |
| 22. | "Loved By Women" | Bacalov | | 3:28 |
| 23. | "The Postman (Trio version)" | Bacalov | | 2:35 |
| 24. | "Sounds of the Island" | Bacalov | | 2:29 |
| 25. | "The Postman's Dreams" | Bacalov | | 3:20 |
| 26. | "Pablito" | Bacalov | | 0:42 |
| 27. | "Milonga del poeta" | Bacalov | | 1:13 |
| 28. | "Madreselva, tango" | Amadori, Canaro | | 2:18 |
| 29. | "The Postman Poet" | Bacalov | | 3:25 |
| 30. | "The Postman (Harpsichord and String version)" | Bacalov | | 0:46 |
| 31. | "The Postman (Guitar and Bandoneon version)" | Bacalov | | 3:16 |
