= The Celebration Tour =

2023–2024 concert tour by Madonna

- Tour by Madonna
- Promotional poster for the tour
- Location: Europe; North America; South America
- Associated albums: Various
- Start date: October 14, 2023
- End date: May 4, 2024
- Legs: 2
- No. of shows: 81
- Attendance: 1.1 million
- Box office: Billboard: US$225.4 million; Pollstar: US$227.2 million

Madonna concert chronology
- Madame X Tour (2019–2020); The Celebration Tour (2023–2024)

The Celebration Tour was the twelfth concert tour by American singer-songwriter Madonna. It began on October 14, 2023, at the O_{2} Arena in London and ended on May 4, 2024, with a free concert on Copacabana Beach at Rio de Janeiro. Originally set to start on July 15, 2023, in Vancouver, the tour was postponed to October after Madonna developed a bacterial infection in late June which led to a multiple-day stay at an intensive care unit. As her first retrospective tour, it was based entirely on her back catalogue and 40-year career.

Rumors of a tour first began circulating in mid-to-late 2022, following the release of the compilation Finally Enough Love: 50 Number Ones. After major speculation, the tour was officially announced on January 17, 2023, in a truth or dare-inspired video. Madonna's first all-arena tour since 2016, tickets quickly sold out and multiple dates were subsequently added in many major cities. Celebration would eventually become one of the fastest-selling concert tours.

Stufish, a British company Madonna had worked with in the past, was in charge of the stage which was inspired by New York in the early 1980s. Designers working on the wardrobe included Guram Gvasalia from Vetements, Donatella Versace, Jean Paul Gaultier, and Dilara Fındıkoğlu. The official set list included songs Madonna had not performed live in more than a decade. Madonna paid tribute to the LGBT community, friends lost to HIV/AIDS, and artists who have inspired her in concert.

Critics reacted positively towards the tour, highlighting its retrospective nature. Criticism was aimed at the singer's tardiness, with attendees going as far as to file two lawsuits against her. Billboard reported Celebration to have grossed over $225.4 million from an audience of 1.1 million, scoring one of the highest-grossing tours of 2024. The free concert in Rio de Janeiro drew a crowd of over 1.6 million people, which became Madonna's largest crowd of her career and at the time set records for the largest audience ever for a stand-alone concert and the largest all-time crowd for a female artist. It subsequently inspired the project Todo Mundo no Rio, a series of international music megashows promoted by the City of Rio de Janeiro to take place in Copacabana Beach every year until 2028.

== Background ==
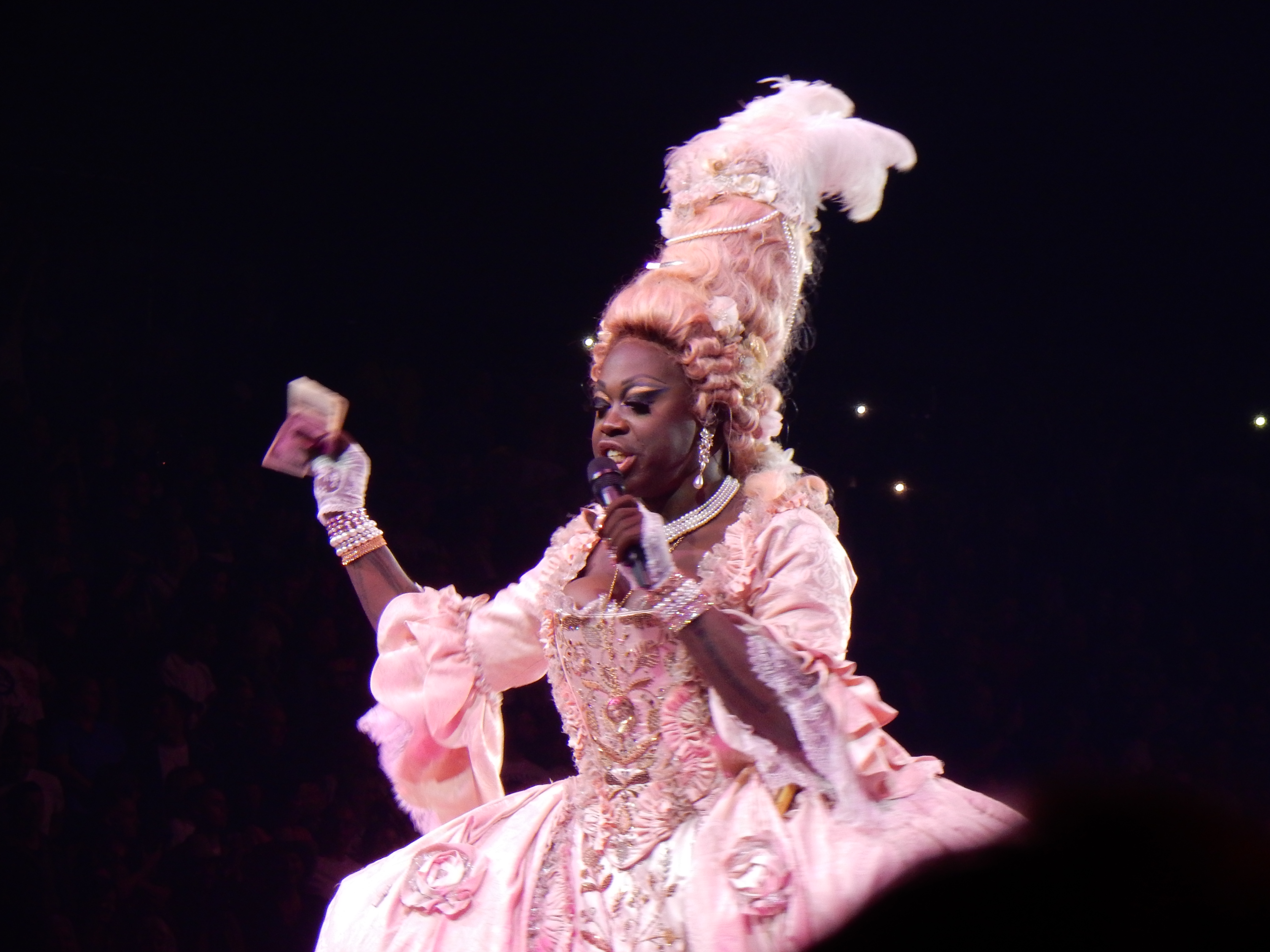
Bob the Drag Queen performing during one of the concerts. He was among the celebrities featured on the video confirming the tour.

On August 19, 2022, Madonna released Finally Enough Love: 50 Number Ones, a compilation album that includes remixes of her 50 number-one hits on the US Billboard Dance Club Songs chart. Following the release, the singer uploaded a six-minute video on her YouTube account in which she answered 50 of her fans' "most burning" questions; one asked if she was going to tour to promote the release, to which she answered: "Do you want me to go on tour?" Prior to the compilation's release, Madonna had expressed her desire to embark on a concert tour during an interview with Variety, where she referred to the stage as her "happy place". Rumors of a tour began circulating in October 2022, after outlets in Latin America began reporting that Madonna had booked a reservation at Montevideo's Estadio Centenario for early October 2023.

In January 2023, Billboard, among other publications, announced that Madonna was planning an "anniversary" tour to celebrate her "deep catalog of hits", and that dates had already been booked at the O_{2} Arena in London. Rumors were fueled after the singer deleted her Instagram posts on January 16. The following day, Madonna officially announced the Celebration Tour through a video. Inspired by her 1991 film Truth or Dare and joined by Diplo, Jack Black, Lil Wayne, and Bob the Drag Queen, among others, the visual ended with Amy Schumer daring Madonna to go on tour and perform her "four decades of mega hits". According to Bob, no one in the video knew what was supposed to happen until the cameras started rolling. A release on Madonna's website referred to the show as an "artistic journey through four decades", with the singer herself adding that she wanted to "explore as many songs as possible in hopes to give my fans the show they have been waiting for". Celebration saw Madonna's return to arenas, as her previous Madame X Tour (2019―2020) played only theaters.

== Development ==
We just get together and talk and go, "What do we do next? You know it's the 40-year anniversary". So it's like, "Do we or don't we?" It just made sense to go out there and celebrate 40 years of an incredible career.

— Manager Guy Oseary on the conception of the Celebration Tour.

On October 12, 2022, Madonna attended Post Malone's Twelve Carat Tour (2022–2023), a show where creative director Lewis James had worked on. After attending, the singer became interested in working with James, and later appointed him and long time collaborator Jamie King as creative directors for Celebration. According to James, she was "extremely involved in the process [...] and she knows what she wants". Ricardo Gomes was commissioned as tour's footage creative director; his job was to film the concert for Madonna, then watch the show every night and see if camera angles had been altered. Choreography was in charge of Marseille-based collective (La)Horde, consisting of Martina Brutti, Jonathan Debrouwer, and Arthur Harel; Madonna heard of the trio through one of her dancers, and contacted them via Instagram. When envisioning numbers, the trio would draw influence from the singer's past. "We were playing with this idea of a retrospective. Sometimes we had to refresh an older choreography, and sometimes we got to be a bit more meta, comparing [Madonna] today against who she was at the time", recalled Brutti.

English musician Stuart Price was appointed musical director after a call he had with Madonna following the tour's announcement. He explained to the BBC that the tour would draw from four decades of archive footage and studio recordings; "A greatest hit doesn't have to be a song. It can be a wardrobe, it can be a video, or a statement". Price also revealed that the concert's storyline would be "highly evolved [...] really, really compelling". Personnel working on the tour included 24 dancers, 3 physical therapists, and a traveling crew of over 200 people―including 25 in the costume department. Bob the Drag Queen was hired by the singer to act as emcee and hype man throughout the concert, having previously met at a pride show in 2022. He jokingly recalled: "[Madonna] DM'd my mom on Instagram [...] My mom texted me like, 'Madonna wants to work with me!'"

According to co-manager Sara Zambreno, the singer's vast catalogue proved to be a problem during the early stages of planning, with the team considering to do different tours each representing a decade: "It was an embarrassment of riches, of songs and visuals and costumes and videos to choose from. And how do you pick? Everyone’s going to have a different opinion on what makes the most sense to put on screen. At the end of the day the best solve was just her voice, her narrative, her story and how she wanted to tell it".

=== Hospitalization and postponement ===
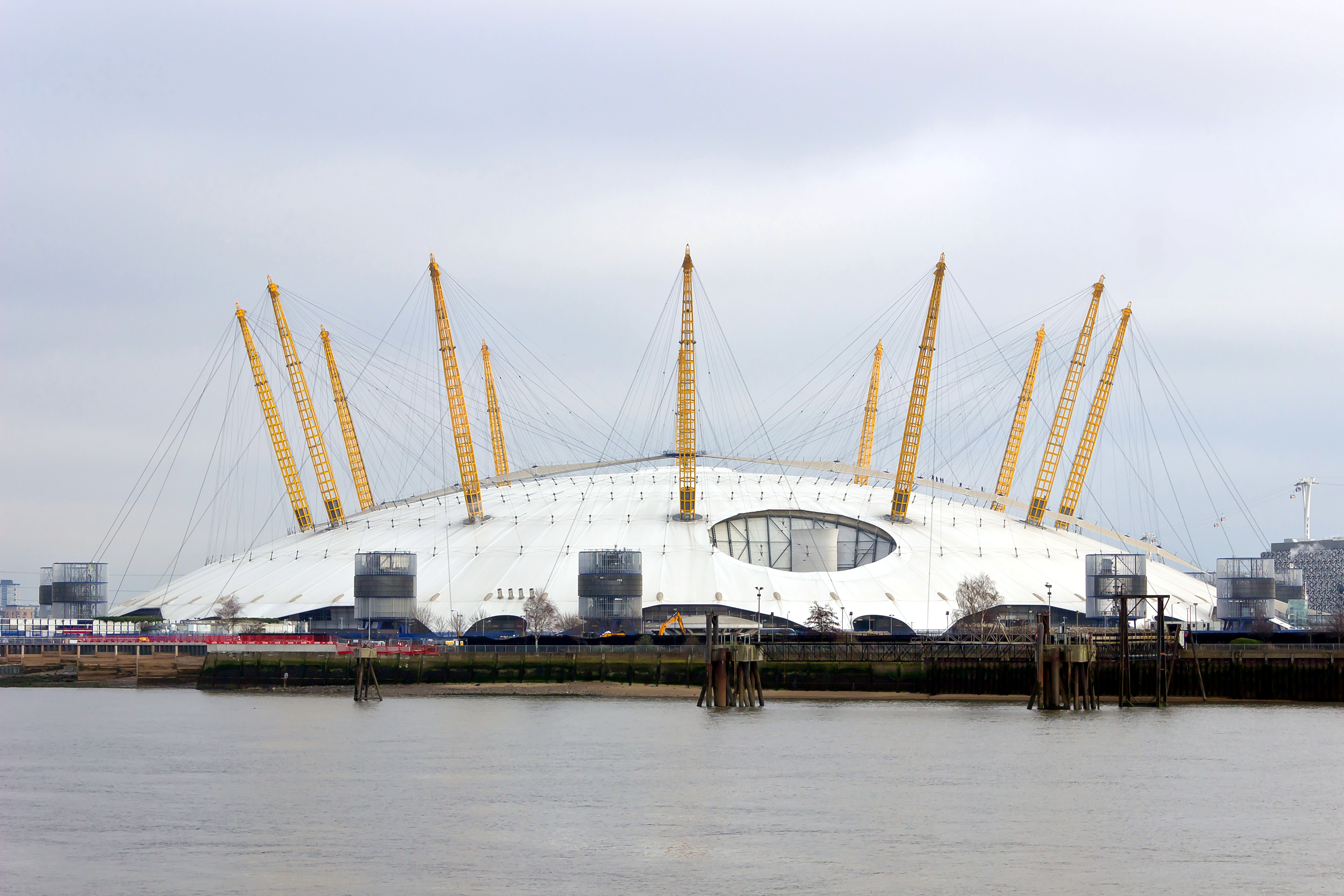
The O_{2} Arena in London, where the Celebration Tour kicked off

On June 24, 2023, Madonna was rushed to the hospital; she was admitted to a several-day stay at an intensive care unit due to a "serious bacterial infection". Her manager Guy Oseary took to Instagram to release a statement, writing: "[Madonna's] health is improving, however she is still under medical care [...] [She] will need to pause all commitments, which includes the tour". Live Nation confirmed that the first leg of the tour, planned to kick off July 15 in Vancouver, would be postponed.

In late July 2023, Madonna expressed her gratitude for her fans, team, and family: "Thank you for your positive energy, prayers and words of healing and encouragement [...] My focus now is on my health and getting stronger and I assure you, I’ll be back with you as soon as I can!", read a social media post. She also said that the plan was to reschedule the North American dates. In a Pollstar article, manager Guy Oseary commented that, since the tour was about "celebrating" Madonna's career and life, it was "perfect that it aligned already with celebrating her 40 years and then something like this happens". He also stated that the health mishap wouldn't necessarily change the run of the show but, "just [bring] more emotion to it" and became more of a "meaningful blessing" after what Madonna endured and came back from.

On August 15, 2023, the rescheduled dates were announced. The Celebration Tour officially began in London on October 14, 2023, and wrapped up with a "historic" free concert in Rio de Janeiro's Copacabana Beach on May 4, 2024. To commemorate the London concerts, the royal family's flagmakers, Flying Colours, made a Royal Standard flag for Madonna's honor. Set to fly at full mast the days of the concerts, the red and gold flag showed an image taken from her third album True Blue (1986). Chris Taylor from Flying Colours commented: "[Madonna] is true pop royalty. We've been manufacturing flags for the Royal Family for over 20 years, but we've never made a flag quite like this".

=== Rehearsals ===
Rehearsals began in early April 2023. In preparation for the tour, in June 2023, Madonna collaborated on two singles; "Popular" with The Weeknd and Playboi Carti, and "Vulgar" with Sam Smith.. By this same month, before Madonna's time in the hospital, sessions were taking place at Uniondale's Nassau Coliseum. Rehearsals resumed at the same venue in mid-August, after Madonna was discharged from the hospital. In October, the week before opening night, it was reported that the troupe had moved to the AO Arena in Manchester for the final dress rehearsals. According to GQ magazine, rehearsals went on for six weeks after Madonna's return to the hospital. Stufish Entertainment stage director and architech Ric Lipson recalled that, "Madonna rehearses unlike most artists [...] Other[s], their dancers go and build the show somewhere and they come in a few weeks later".

== Production ==
=== Staging ===
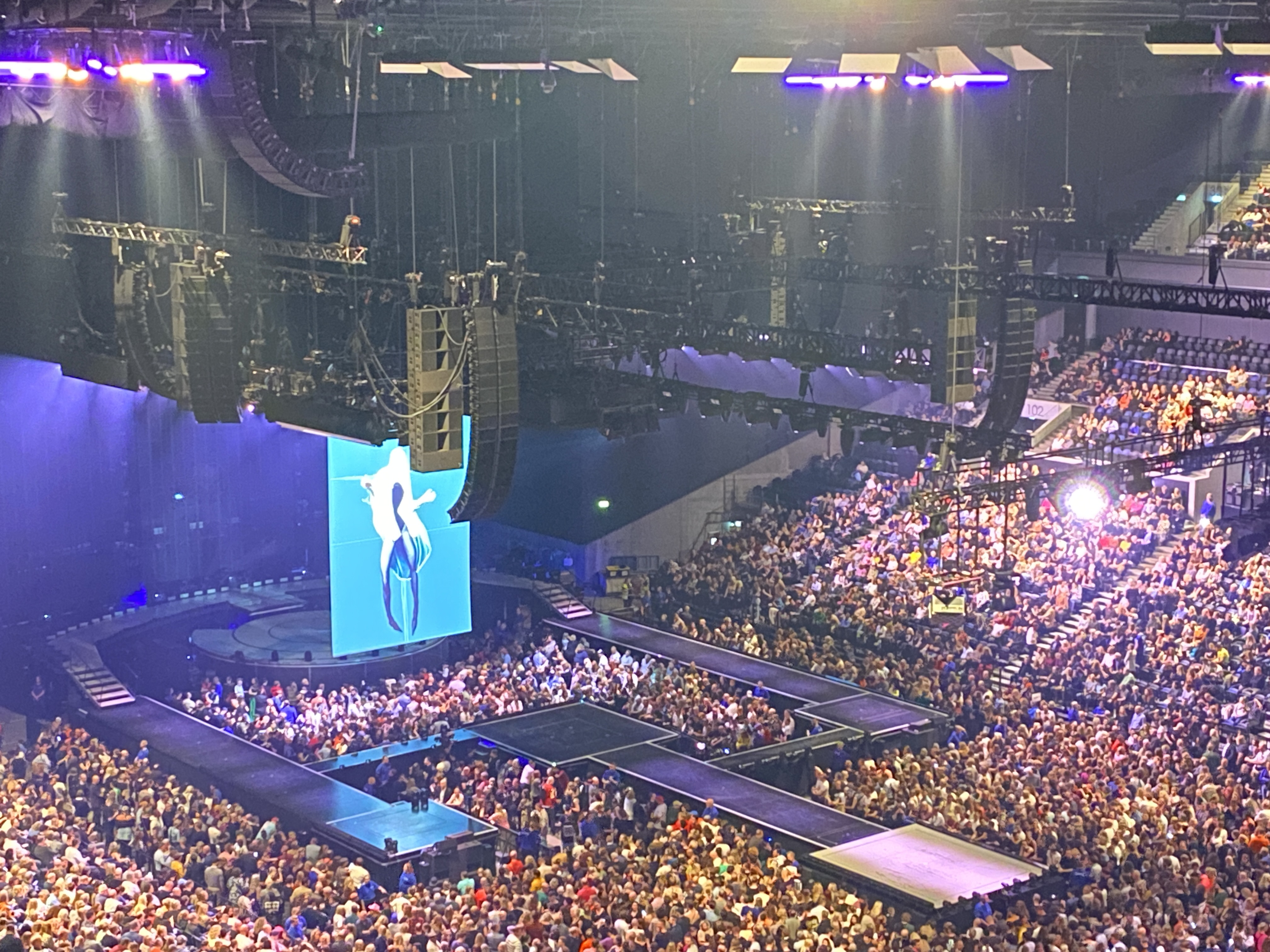
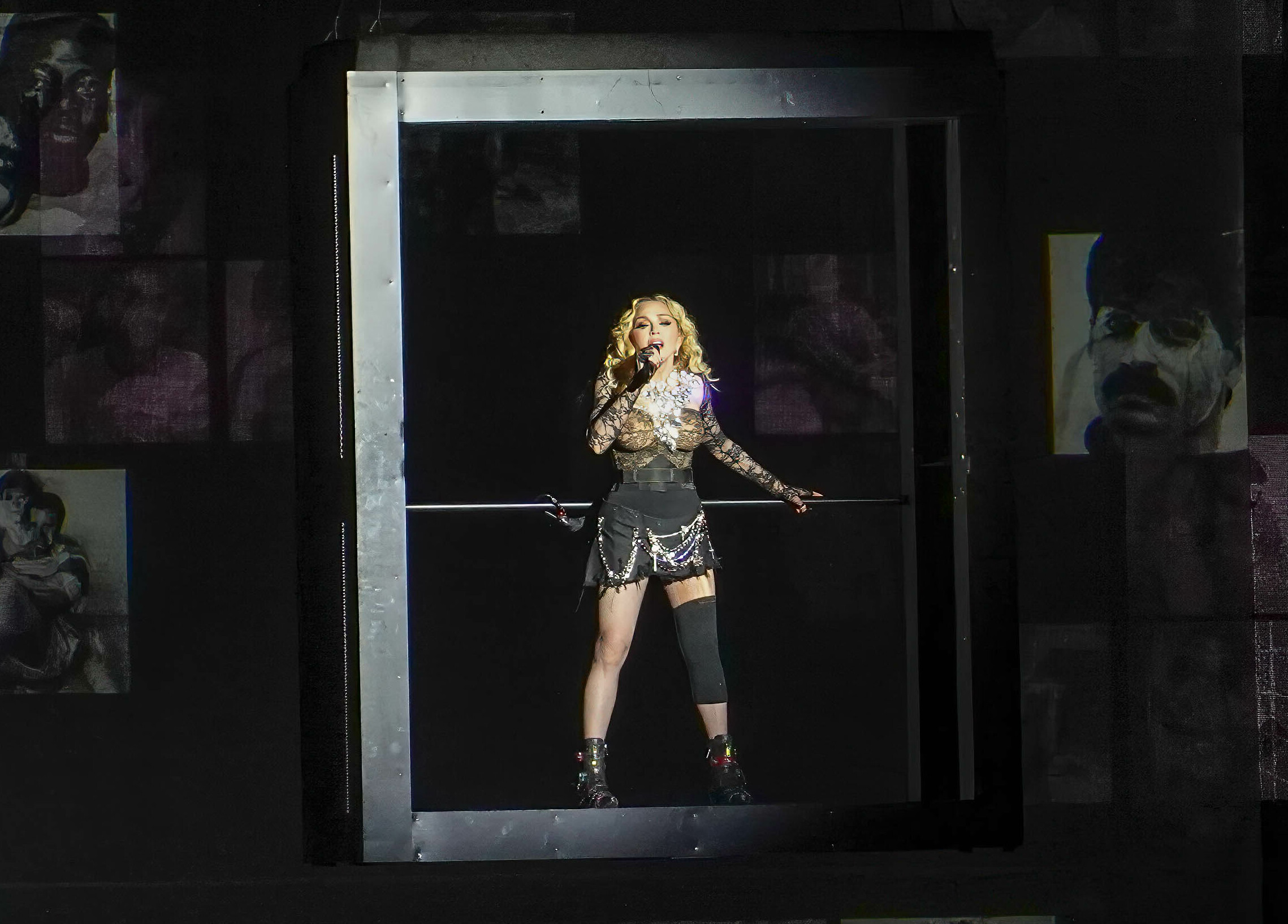
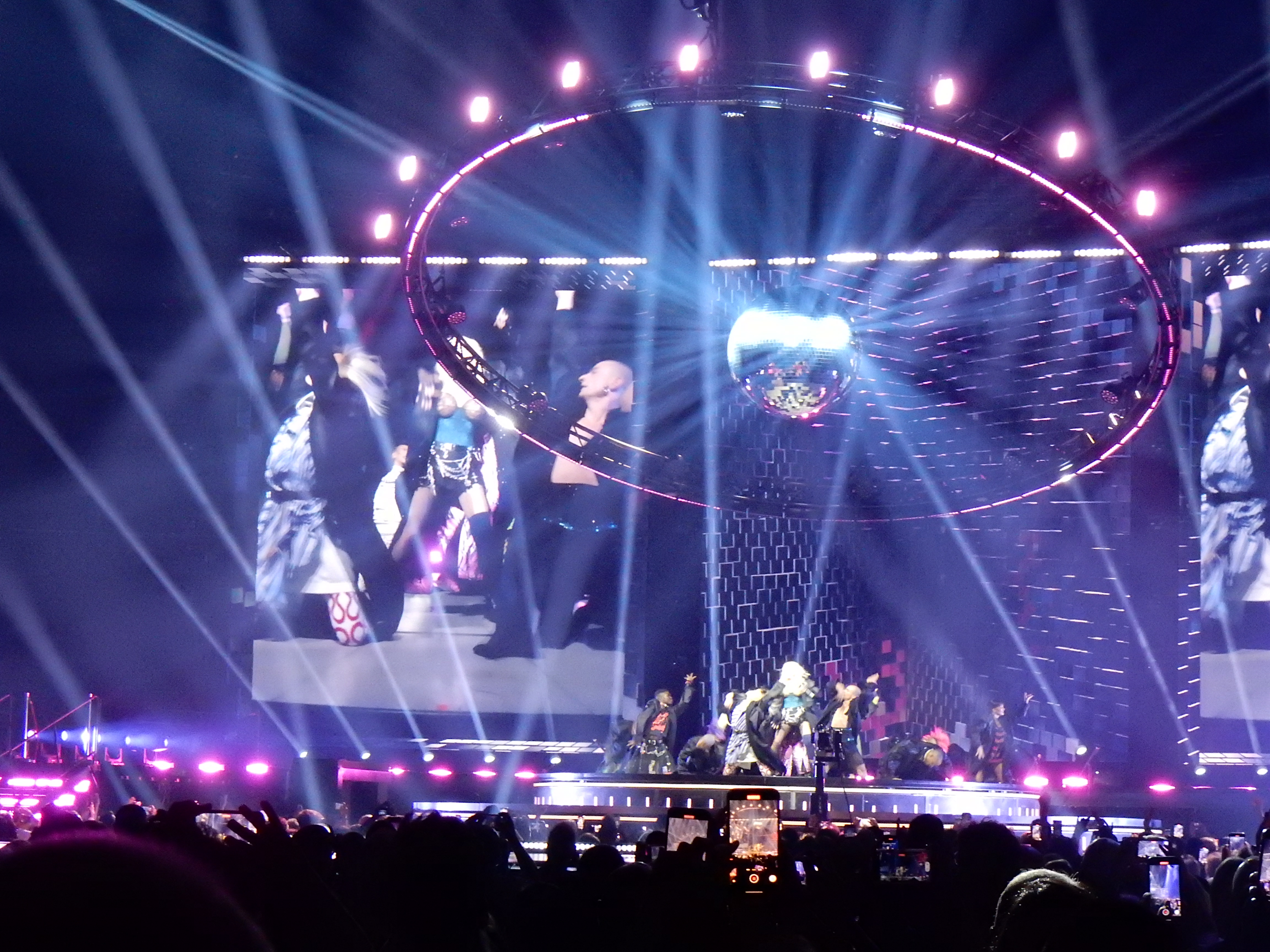
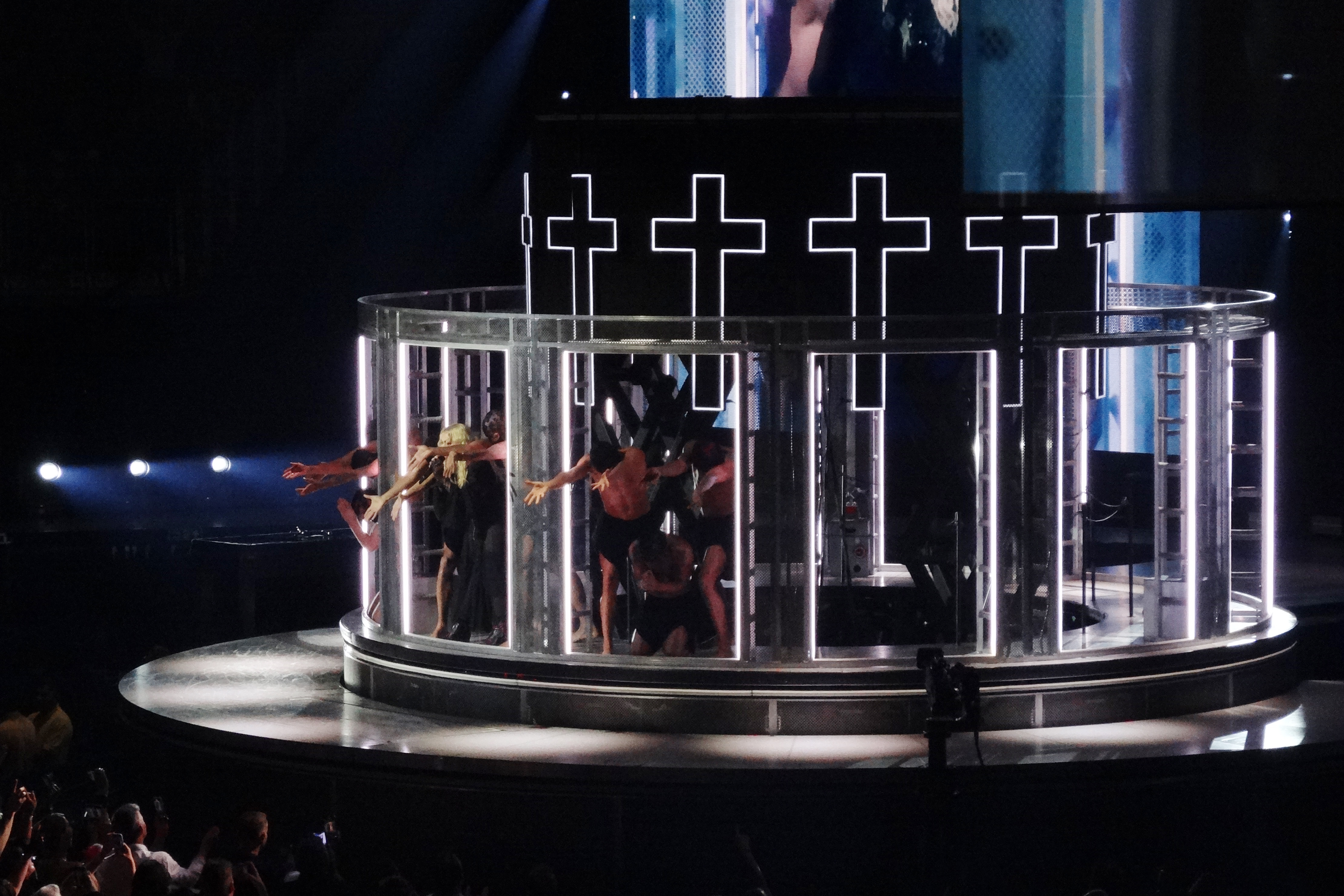
Clockwise: The stage for the tour with the multiple runways; Madonna singing "Live to Tell" from atop the floating portal; the cross-adorned carousel used on "Like a Prayer", and the circular lighting rig and disco ball.

For the stage, Madonna worked with London-based company Stufish, with whom she had worked on the MDNA (2012), Rebel Heart (2015–2016), and Madame X tours. Lipson explained that they wanted to do something different to those outings, and came to the conclusion of a more immersive experience; "the way [Madonna] is seen, through video and her social media now for example, has changed. So we thought about making a show about where she is in the room".

According to James, the show revolves around four main themes: Time, New York City, fragments, and "the story of [Madonna]". Drawing on these elements, as well as the singer's 40-year long career, the stage was conceived as an abstract map of New York, with a network of B-stages and runways inspired by the streets and blocks of Manhattan —Uptown, Downtown, Midtown, East and West. The team also came up with a kinetic, revolving, three-layered circular central stage that refers to both the wedding cake from Madonna's performance of "Like a Virgin" at the 1984 MTV Video Music Awards and a clock's shape. Also present was a floating, illuminated portal frame that lifted Madonna 9 m (30 ft) off the ground, and moved at 4.5 m (15 ft) per second. It allowed the singer to fly over the audience and move between the stage. According to Lipson, the portal was meant to act like a "time machine". "Live to Tell" (1986) was one of the numbers that saw Madonna riding the flying portal.

For the song "Bedtime Story" (1995), the front of the stage would rise 5 m (16 ft) and transform into a giant cube. Projectors covered each side of the cube, and depicted a video created by Brazilian video game developer Gabriel Massan. Inspired by the original "Bedtime Story" music video, Massan's visual depicted "dreamy" landscapes, while Madonna's movements were recorded in real time and linked to an avatar that emulated them. The stage also came equipped with a vast circular lighting rig, 14 spotlights, 600 intelligent lighting, and over 8,800 lighting cues. Props included a massive disco ball for "Holiday" (1983), and a carousel adorned with crosses for "Like a Prayer" (1989).

=== Songs ===
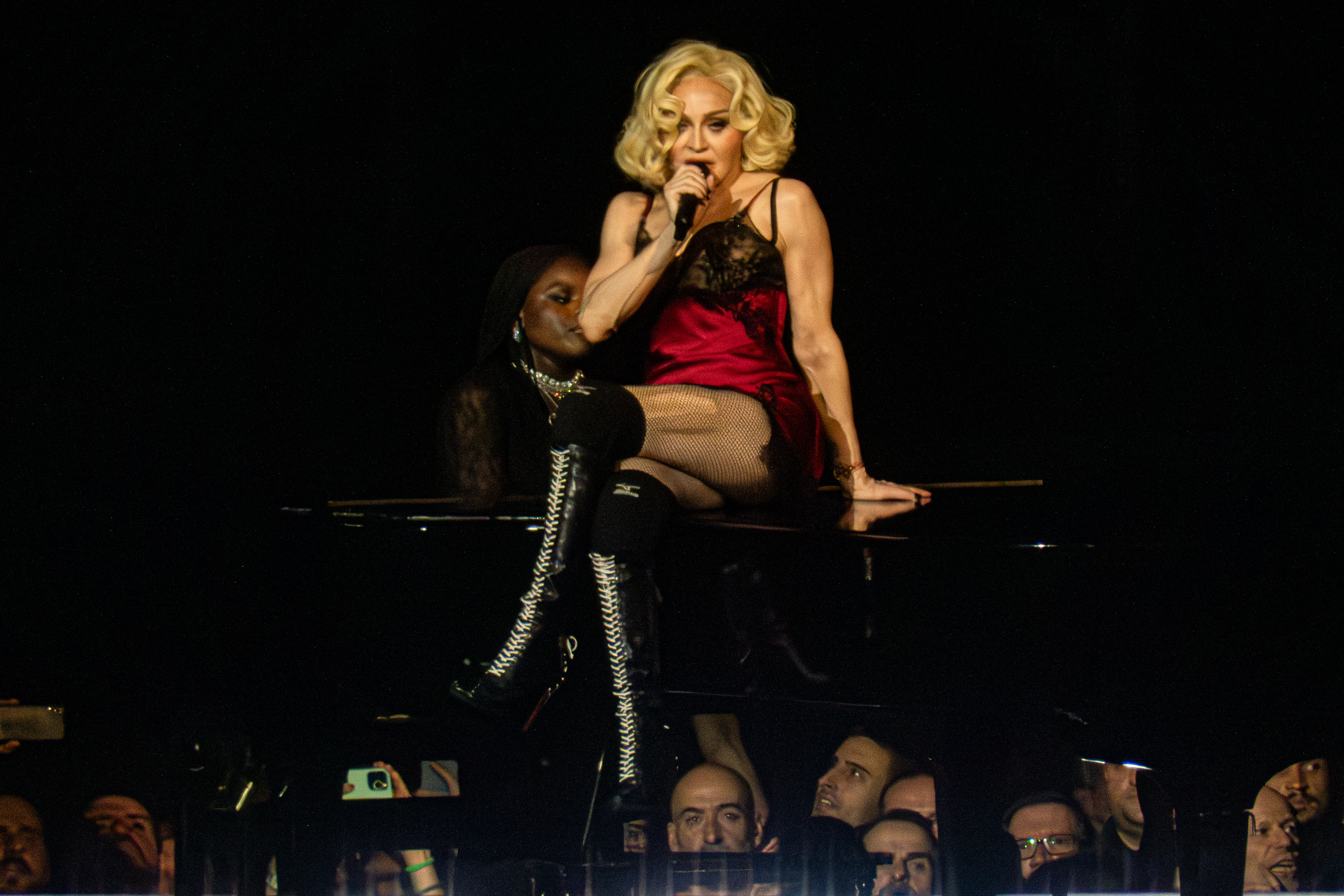
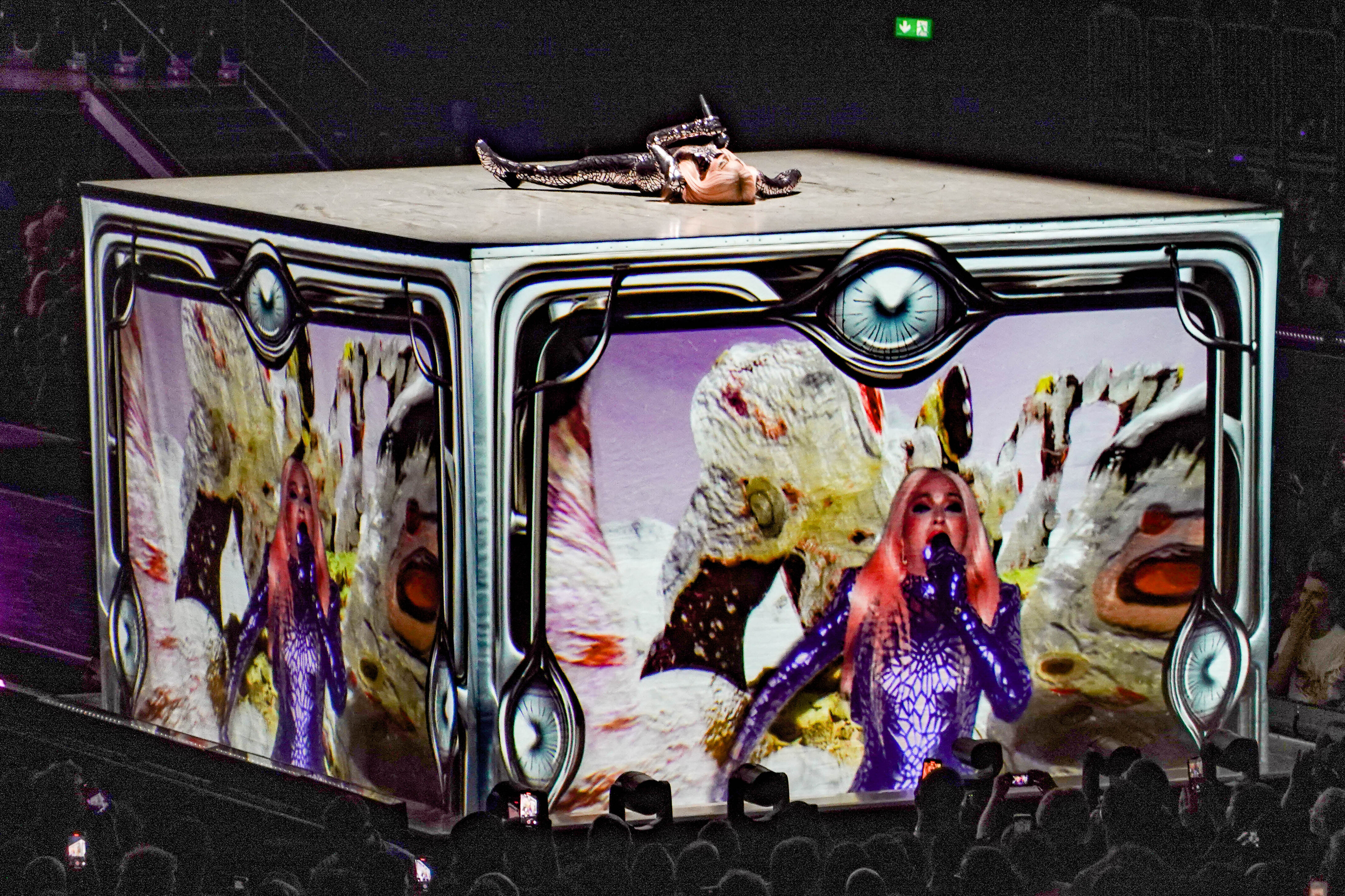
The Celebration Tour included songs Madonna had not performed live in decades, such as "Bad Girl" (left) and "Bedtime Story" (right), which was sung on top of the giant cube.

When discussing the tour, Price revealed that the set list would include more than 40 songs, as well as a "couple of spoken word sections". Additionally, Celebration was the first Madonna tour to not feature an onstage live band. This was allegedly Madonna's decision, as she wanted to focus on the original recordings; nonetheless, her children played instruments on certain parts of the show. Upon announcement, publications like Billboard, Variety, Rolling Stone UK, and Consequence each created their "dream set list". In February 2023, the singer posted a picture on her Instagram, asking her fans, "what songs should I play?" She went on to upload a series of stories of herself writing out potential tracks for the concerts, including songs like "Like a Virgin", "Papa Don't Preach" (1986), "Crazy For You" (1985), "Lucky Star" (1983), "Rescue Me" (1991), "Erotica" (1992), and "Bad Girl" (1993), among others. A poll was created by Billboard for fans to vote on which songs they would like to hear on the tour.

The official set list included songs Madonna had not performed in more than a decade: "Bedtime Story" and "Nothing Really Matters", last performed in 1995 and 1999, respectively; "Justify My Love" (1990), "Bad Girl", and "Rain" (1993) were sung for the first time since 1993; "Die Another Day" (2002), "Mother and Father" (2003), and "Live to Tell" had not been part of a tour since the mid-2000s. Other songs included were a cover of Gloria Gaynor's "I Will Survive" (1978), and "Don't Cry for Me Argentina" (1996).

=== Fashion and styling ===
In July 2023, The New York Times reported that designer Guram Gvasalia from Vetements had been "secretly" working with the singer on the tour's looks and costumes. For the official wardrobe, Madonna worked with designers Eyob Yohannes and Rita Melssen. The duo came up with the outfits by focusing on the show's main theme: Madonna's 40-year long career. They decided to make their creations refer some of the singer's most famous outfits from the past; "[Fashion] has always been a part of [Madonna's] storytelling, so we drew from her past stylistically, and we kept those themes within the costumes", recalled Yohannes. Additional designers included Gvasalia, Donatella Versace, Jean Paul Gaultier, and Dilara Fındıkoğlu. While coming up with the looks, Melssen and Yohannes had to take into consideration movement and functionality, as the singer goes through several costume changes throughout the concert. To make changing easy, all the clothes came with back zippers; Madonna would also wear one costume underneath another.

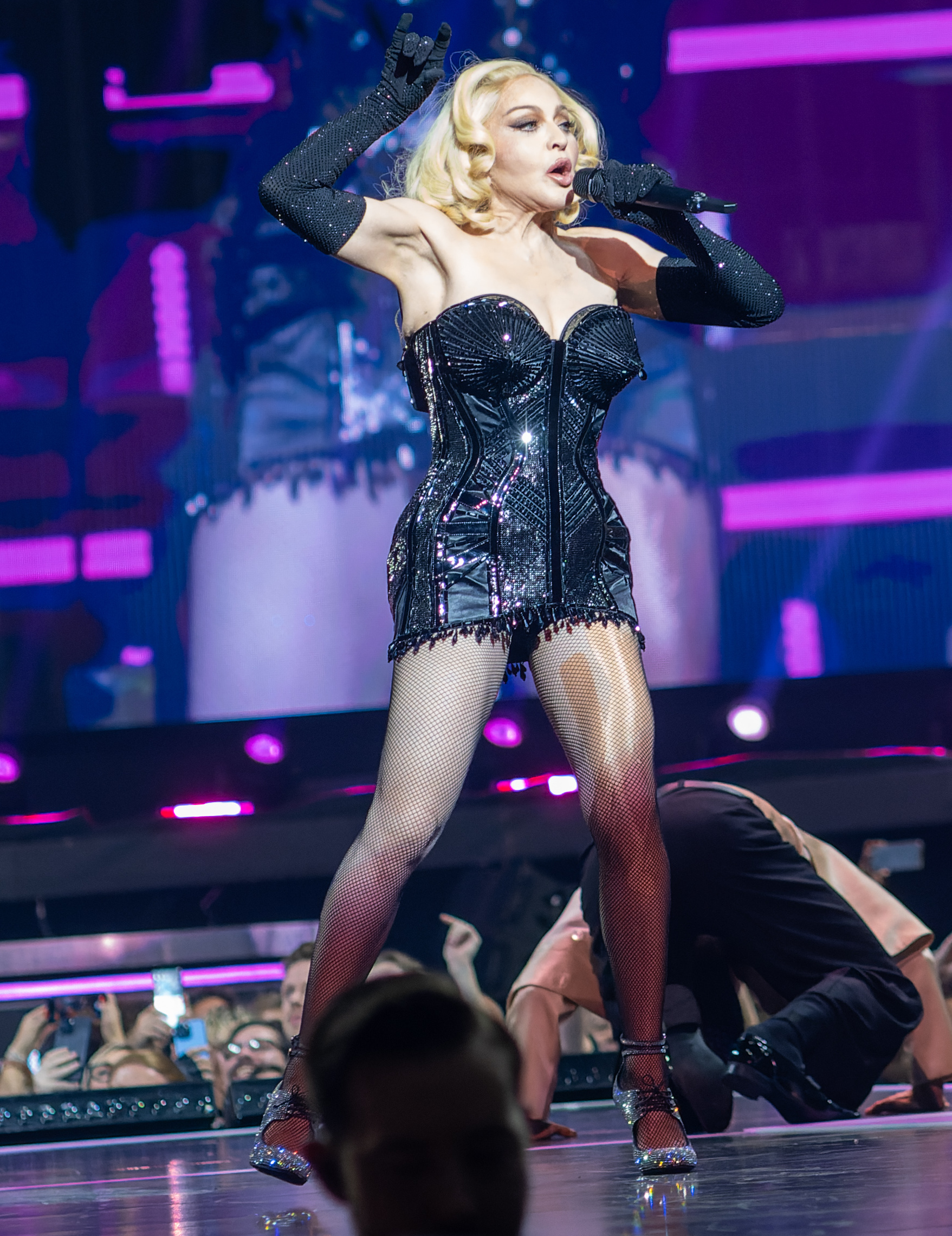
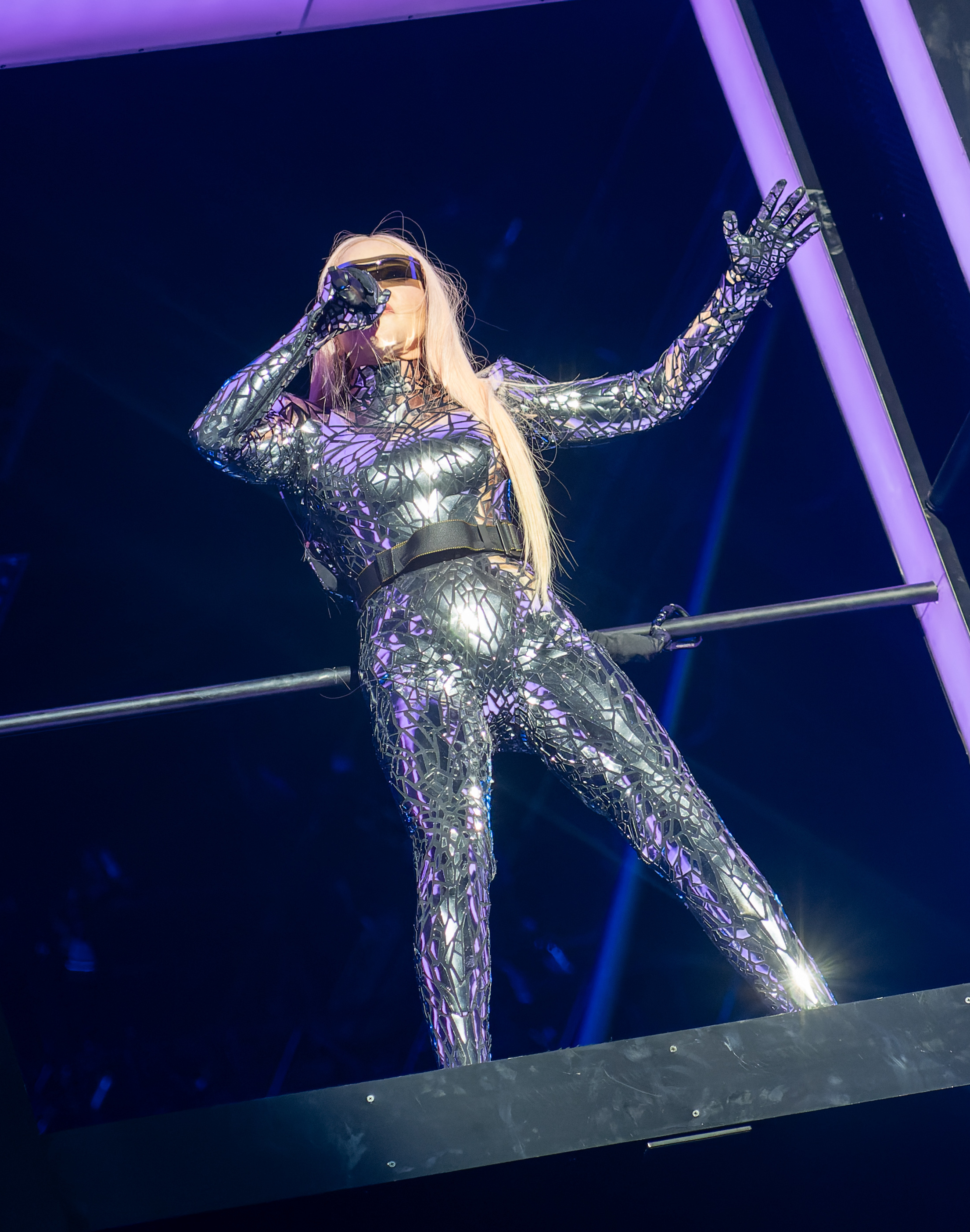
Madonna performing "Vogue" (left) and "Ray of Light" (right), wearing the Jean Paul Gaultier-designed mini dress, and the Versace silver catsuit. She also dons the wigs created by Andy Lecompte.

For the first act, which was based on 1980s New York, Fındıkoğlu came up with a "punky" tailcoat, inspired on one Madonna had worn during a performance in Japan; "it was a men’s coat that she got from a vintage store [...] [For the new one], we tricked it out, and added memorabilia and pins from the ’80s onto it", explained Yohannes. A boxing theme was used on the wardrobe of the 1990s-inspired second act. Madonna donned a red silk slip dress with black lace details underneath a boxing robe, along with a pair of knee-length, lace-up heeled boots. Wanting to explore the sexual liberation of songs like "Erotica", Yohannes and Melssen settled on a boxing theme. Gaultier created the outfit for the performance of "Vogue" (1990): a black conical mini dress, encrusted with black crystals, that echoes the one Madonna wore on the Blond Ambition World Tour of 1990. A model of green, yellow, and blue tones was created specifically for the Rio de Janeiro show. The third act was based on the 2000s, and included songs like "Die Another Day" and "Don't Tell Me" (2000). Ruslan Baginskiy came up with an ensemble consisting of custom Miu Miu steel-toed cowboy boots, a leather corset, a studded shirt, and a leather cowboy hat.

The show's final look was created by Versace with the intention of taking the singer to the metaverse; it is a silver catsuit with oversized shoulders that resembles an armor, made in the pattern of broken glass. One sequence towards the end has dancers recreating 17 of Madonna's past looks and outfits, a lot of which were still in the singer's possession. Madonna gave Yohaness and Melssen access to these clothes so the new costumes' fabric and embroidery would match the originals'. Additional clothing included a denim mini-skirt draped in chains and cross charms, a blue leotard, fishnet tights, a white lace veil, and 40 pairs of boxing gloves; Yohannes designed a black kimono, which was worn with a halo-style headpiece by House of Malakai. Versace also created a printed bodysuit with knee-high boots, worn by Madonna's daughter Estere during "Vogue". A necklace with teardrop-shaped crystals was provided by Swarovski. Stylist Andy Lecompte created two blonde wigs Madonna wore on the show. One was a bob "dramatically" parted to the side and curled in big ringlets―based on the singer's appearance in the "Vogue" video and the 1990 film Dick Tracy―and the other was long, pin-straight with pink tones. Madonna was involved in "every single [part of the] process [...] She cares about who the characters are, and the clothes telling that story", explained Yohannes.

=== Philanthropy and tributes ===
In early October 2023, Madonna teamed up with fashion brand Ministry of Tomorrow to launch a limited edition line of merchandise, set to be sold both online and at a handful of venues the tour would visit. 100% of proceeds would go to the singer's charity Raising Malawi, and the Chema Vision Children's Center. A concert in Nashville was announced as response to the Tennessee Senate Bill 3, and to the "100 anti-LGBTQ+ bills currently before state legislatures" in the United States. Calling the oppression of LGBTQ+ people "unacceptable and inhumane", Madonna vowed to donate portion of the proceeds from the Nashville show to trans rights organizations. Said concert, however, was cancelled due to scheduling conflicts.

Throughout the show, Madonna paid tribute to deceased musicians and artists who have influenced her, including Billie Holiday, David Bowie, Michael Jackson, Prince, and Sinéad O'Connor. In the performance of "Live to Tell", about 300 pictures of people who died during the AIDS epidemic—including Keith Haring and Freddie Mercury—appeared on drop-down screens and banners that were draped throughout the venue. Ukrainian-born director Sasha Kasiuha was commissioned by Madonna to orchestrate the video effects; additionally, with the help of the creator of Instagram account The AIDS Memorial, she was able to get the names of more than 100,000 victims. British singer Elton John applauded this tribute. While on the tour, the singer also referred political events such as the Russian invasion of Ukraine, the ongoing Gaza war, and the November 2015 Paris attacks.

== Concert synopsis ==
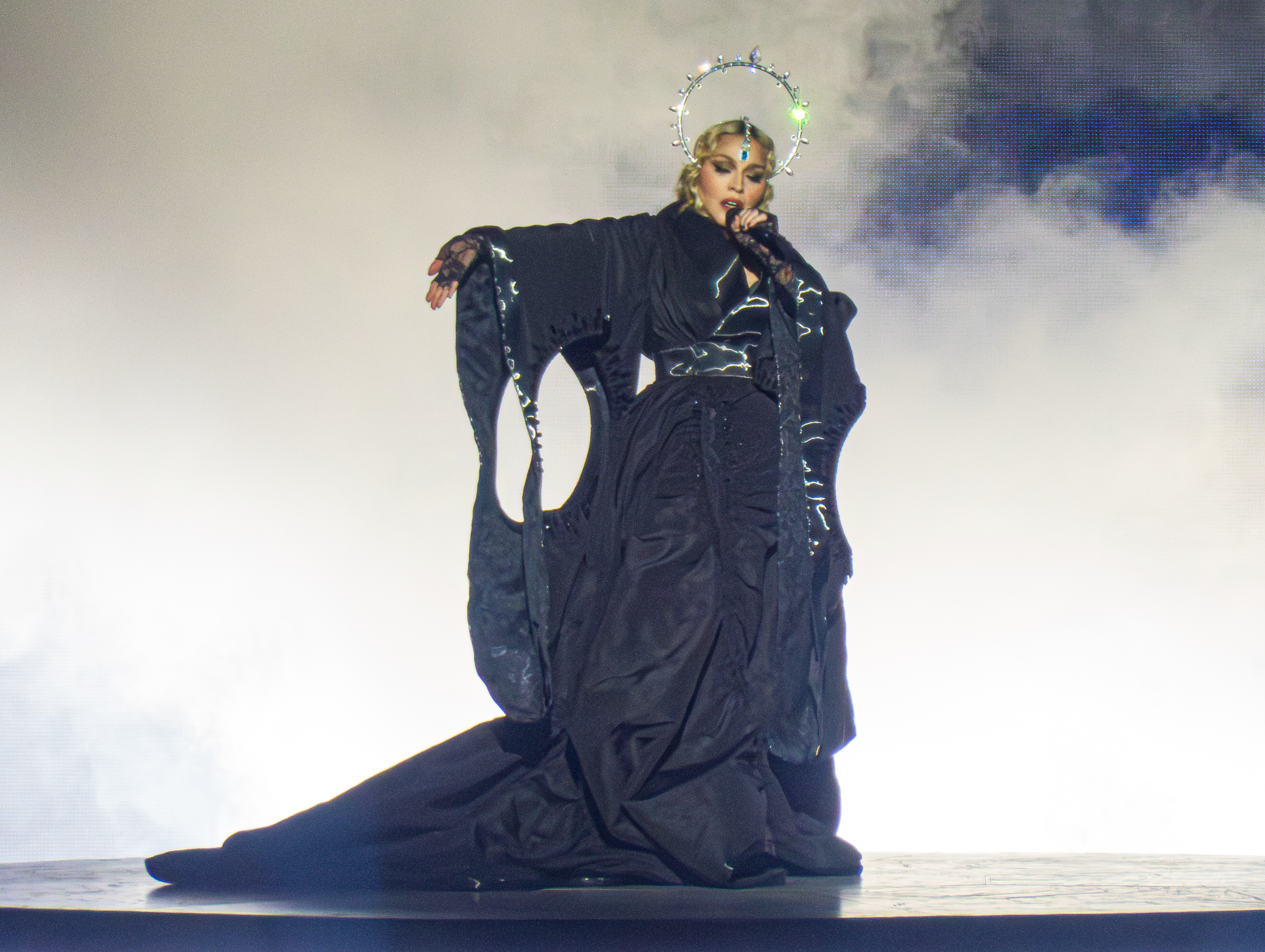
Madonna opened the concert with a performance of "Nothing Really Matters".

Before the concert, the screen displayed an artwork by Los Angeles-based artist Jess Cuevas, showing a distorted picture of Madonna. After a DJ set, the concert began with an introduction by Bob the Drag Queen, who walked to the stage through the audience set to a remix of "Deeper and Deeper" (1992), wearing a Marie Antoinette inspired dress, similar to the one worn by Madonna during the 1990 MTV Video Music Awards performance of "Vogue". He told the audience about Madonna's beginnings in New York City in the late 1970s and early 1980s. Following the speech, Madonna appeared on the circular center stage to perform "Nothing Really Matters" in the black Yohannes Kimono. "Everybody" and "Into the Groove" followed; the singer lost the kimono and switches to the Fındıkoğlu tailcoat. She was joined by dancers dressed in 1980s-inspired gear, while the backdrop screens depicted a New York City skyline. Following a speech where she told the audience that she's going to "tell you the story of my life", where she was joined by a dancer dressed like her younger self, Madonna sang "Burning Up" on guitar as VHS-style projections of the CBGB played on the backdrops. "Open Your Heart" had the singer writhing on a chair, echoing the music video.

"Holiday" was performed underneath a disco ball on the circular stage, set up to resemble Danceteria and Paradise Garage, as Bob played as a bouncer who won't let Madonna enter the club. The number ended with the dancers slowly dropping to the floor. Madonna covered the last one with her trenchcoat and disappeared under the stage. Following the opening verse of "In This Life" (1992), "Live to Tell" was sung with the singer flying over the audience on the portal frame. Images of people who died of HIV/AIDS were projected on the screens and throughout the venue. "Like a Prayer" closed the act. Mashed up with Madonna's own "Act of Contrition", and "Unholy" (2022) by Sam Smith and Kim Petras, it was performed atop a rotating carousel with crosses depicting a chapel, and dancers as half naked crucifixes. At the end, her son David Banda played the guitar solo from "Act of Contrition" dressed as a Prince look-alike, while the screens showed the message "I Would Die 4 U".

The second act began with an interlude set to the instrumental of "Living for Love" (2014). Then, Bob appeared on the screens and gave a brief speech about relationships in the 1990s. "Erotica" was performed with Madonna and the troupe in boxing gear. The string introduction of "Papa Don't Preach" played as Madonna recreated the masturbation sequence of the Blond Ambition tour with a dancer wearing one of the tour's costumes on the red velvet bed from that tour. An orgy-like performance of "Justify My Love" followed. After singing the first verse of "Fever", a mash-up of "Hung Up" and its remix, "Hung Up on Tokischa", was performed by Madonna amid topless dancers; Dominican rapper Tokischa made an appearance on video. For "Bad Girl", Madonna was joined by her daughter Mercy James on piano. The ballroom performance of "Vogue" featured the troupe, including Estere, breakdancing and voguing. They were dressed in ballroom-inspired costumes, and strut on the catwalk as Madonna and a guest judged them. Policemen then subdued the singer, giving way to a shortened performance of "Human Nature". The act ended with "Crazy for You", which saw the singer hug a dancer decked out in the bondage costume from the original "Human Nature" music video.

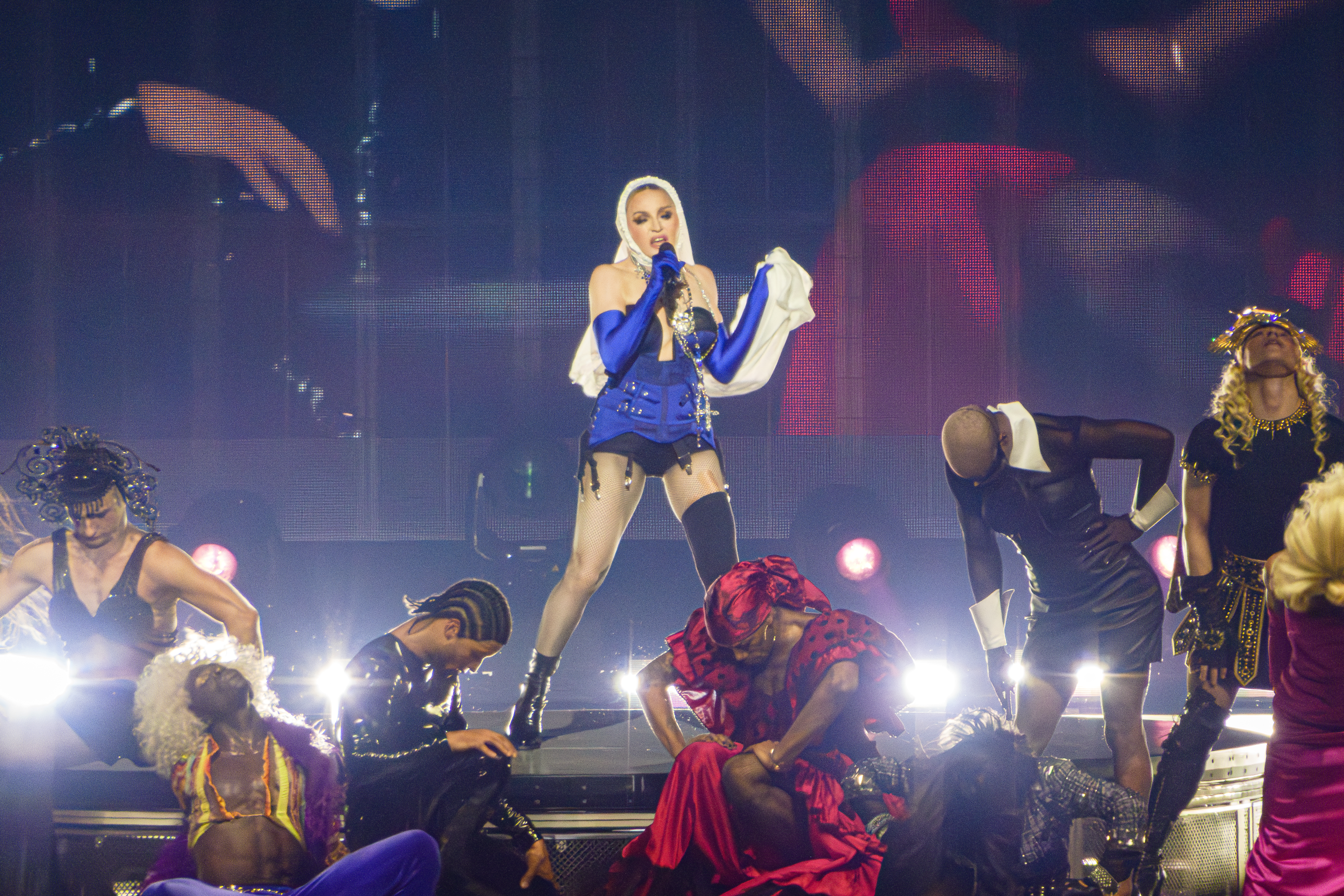
The concert's final number, "Bitch I'm Madonna", depicting the singer surrounded by multiple dancers dressed like her throughout her career

A video interlude set to "The Beast Within" opened the third act; it showed footage taken from the 2002 Steven Klein installation project X-STaTIC PRO=CeSS. The singer and dancers donned leather cowboy-inspired gear for the performance of "Die Another Day", which took place amid lasers. "Don't Tell Me" saw Madonna reenacting the song's music video, and engaging in a mock shootout with Bob. A country-tinged "Mother and Father" was sung as a duet between Madonna and her son David Banda; images of the singer's mother and Banda's biological mother were shown on the backdrops. Madonna then addressed the audience, looking back on motherhood and her hospitalization, and did an acoustic rendition of "I Will Survive". This was followed by a mashup of "La Isla Bonita" and "Don't Cry for Me Argentina"; Madonna was joined by a topless dancer in Army pants, and wrapped herself up in a rainbow flag. An interlude that interpolated "I Don't Search I Find" and fragments of her Billboard Women in Music 2016 speech closed the section.

Madonna wore the Versace catsuit and a long blonde wig for the final act. It began with "Bedtime Story", sung atop a giant cube at the front of the stage. Massan's visuals played on the cube as Madonna sang. The ending of "Bedtime Story" was connected to the beginning of the next number, "Ray of Light". Performed on its Sasha Ultra Violet remix, the singer flew over the audience in the portal frame, as dancers performed amid lasers on the circular stage. The section's final song was a shortened "Rain"; footage of the "Frozen" music video played on the screens, as Madonna—decked out in a long black robe—was embraced by a dancer in black. On the final interlude, set to a mashup of "Like a Virgin" and Jackson's "Billie Jean" (1982), silhouettes of Madonna and Jackson interacted and hugged each other on the screens. The video ended with the phrase "Never Can Say Goodbye".

The closing number was "Bitch I'm Madonna", which had the cheers from her 2012 single "Give Me All Your Luvin'". Dancers marched onstage dressed as different incarnations of the singer, whilst Madonna herself wore a blue corset and gloves, lace veil, and heavy jewelry, similar to the artwork shown before the concert. A short snippet of "Celebration" followed, featuring a chorus from "Music". After her past incarnations hugged her and said goodbye to her, Madonna ended the concert thanking the audience and covering her face with the veil, disappearing into the stage. As the audience left the venue, an instrumental version of "The Power of Good-Bye" (1998) played over the PA system.

== Critical reception ==
=== Europe ===
With no band, an entourage of dancers and one very attentive avatar, Madonna serves up four decades of greatest hits in a multimedia spectacle that ranges from steamy to sombre.

— The Guardian's Kitty Empire commenting on one of the London concerts.

Of the opening night in London, the BBC's Mark Savage applauded the singer's looks, vocals, and the way she moved, "from one elaborate set-piece to the next with conviction and power". From Variety, Mark Sutherland agreed and added that while "Madonna still doesn’t know how to quit, boy has she learned how to come back". Joe Lynch from Billboard wrote: "This wasn’t just a party – it was an exuberant victory lap for a woman who showed up to New York City with $35 and turned herself into the biggest pop diva the world has ever seen". NME's Nick Levine gave the concert a perfect five-star rating, and applauded its "rich autobiographical narrative". He was pleased with the participation of Bob the Drag Queen, and the show's "spectacular set-pieces [that reference] iconic highlights from Madonna’s reign", such as "Vogue", "Bedtime Story", and "Ray of Light". Levine ended his review by referring to Celebration as a "thrilling reminder that Madonna isn’t just a pop star, but also a cultural force who genuinely changed the world".

Rolling Stone UK's Nick Reilly deemed the concert, "two hours of overblown, indulgent fun that refuses to dance to the beat of anyone else’s drum"; he also singled out the performances, particularly "Holiday" and "Live to Tell", which he classified as "the first powerful moment of the night". Celebration is a "spectacular, ambitious and occasionally bemusing" concert, according to The Arts Desk's Thomas H. Green, who also praised "Live to Tell", "Hung Up", and "Vogue", which he named the best moment of the night. Laura Snapes from The Guardian also lauded "Vogue" for its ballroom theme, which she felt showcased a genuine bond between Madonna and the LGBTQ+ community. The participation of the singer's children was also met with praise. Reviewing the Paris concert, the staff of France 24 noted that Madonna's appearance and performances were her best in years. Luis Hidalgo from El País considered it "one of the most complete and dazzling [concerts] by an artist who's given impressive shows [known for] their elegance, originality and fearlessness".

From Vogue, Liam Hess was impressed with the singer's mood; describing her previous tours as "a little robotic in their military-level precision and acrobatic choreography", he added that she seemed "thrilled" to be back on stage and her presence was perceived "warmer than in previous years". Shaad D’Souza from Pitchfork described Celebration as "an Architectural Digest of the [Madonna] archives, as she shimmied across three catwalks, stepping into sets that echoed past tours and iconic moments", commenting that her voice sounded the best it has "since Ray of Light". D'Souza nonetheless, observed that although the show wasn't as "meticulous and highly conceptual" as the singer's past tours, "[that] was also [its] greatest strength, allowing for brilliant choreographed moments [...] and sections that felt off-the-cuff. Kirsten Sokol, from Belgian broadcaster VRT, was satisfied with the "dazzling" concert, but chastised the singer's tardiness and lack of a live band. Sutherland also criticized the lack of a band.

The inclusion of "The Beast Within" was criticized both by Snapes and Reilly; the latter deemed it "overlong", and added that, "[w]hen hits like ‘Papa Don’t Preach’ are tonight relegated to a mere intro, you wonder if it's worth it". Both Snapes and Green both agreed that the show lost some narrative as it went on, specifically after the second act. Reilly was also critical of Jackson's inclusion on "Like a Virgin".

=== North America ===
For USA Today, Melissa Ruggieri called the tour an "effective commemoration of a woman who has fulfilled every accomplishment, yet still possesses a scrappy drive", and placed "Holiday", "La Isla Bonita", "Vogue", and "Like a Prayer" among the night's best numbers. The New York Times' Caryn Ganz wrote that the first act was the "most carefree", with "Like a Prayer" being the "most spectacular" performance. She also noted that the singer seemed "looser and chattier" than on previous tours, and let the dancers "do much of the heavy lifting, though she still handled choreography". Criticism was given to the lack of a band, as Ganz felt it "removed some of the theater of the show and put extra pressure on Madonna's vocals". Reviewing the opening American concert in New York, Ricardo Gomez from Variety said that Madonna's tardiness was "worth the wait", and singled out "Ray of Light" as the show's best moment; "watching [her] soar above a strobe-lit stadium as she performs ['Ray of Light'] is alone worth the price of admission". Celebration was referred to as a highly energetic, busy, "two-hour-plus performance that carried fans [...] into the wee hours of the morning on a wave of welcome nostalgia", by Boston.com's Kristi Palma. Azul del Olmo from Excélsior regarded the show as a "legacy celebration that goes beyond than just music, but also religion, sexuality, and everything only Madonna can group into a completely inclusive party, where no one is different".

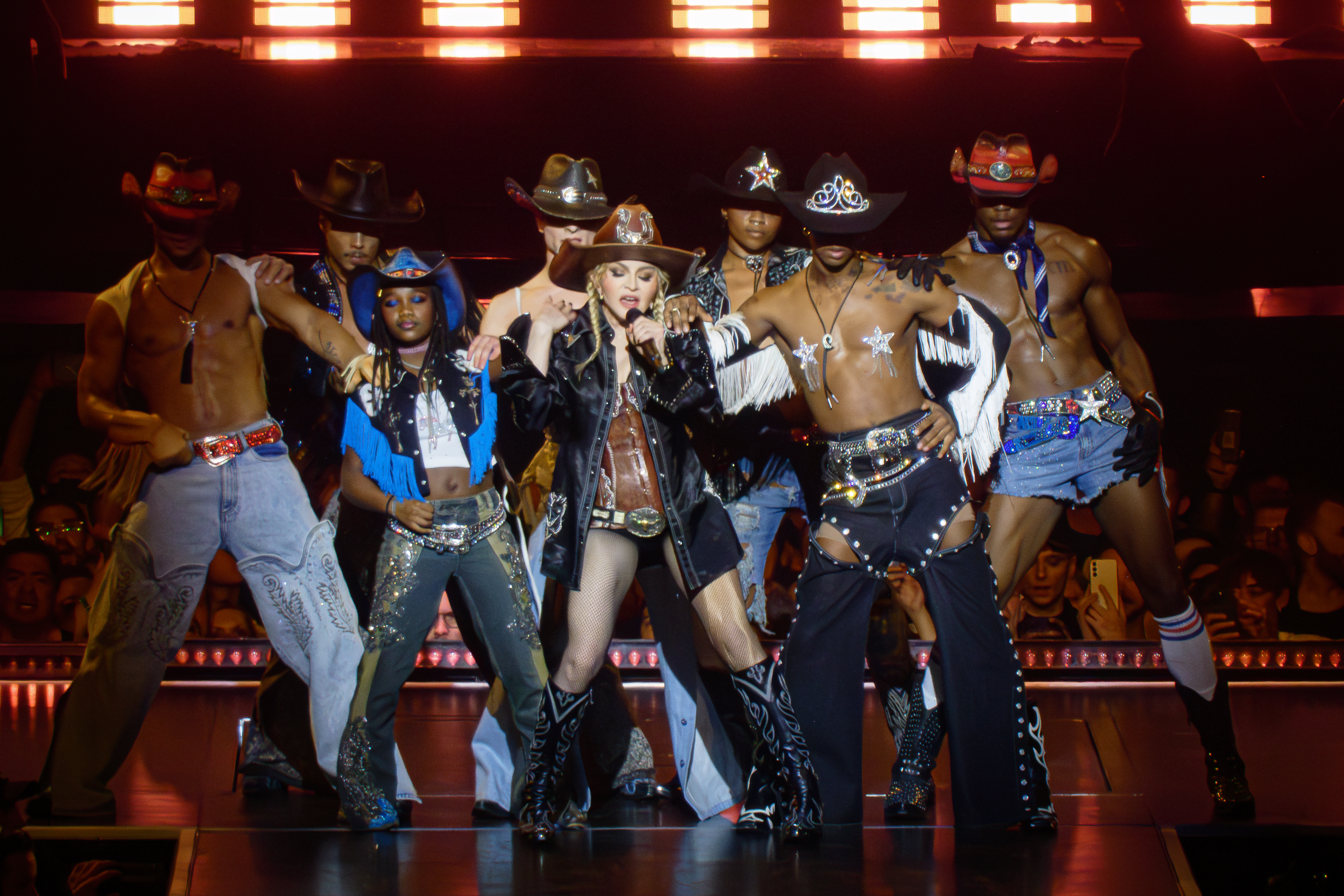
"Don't Tell Me" was referred to as a "spirited highlight of the night" by the Washington Blade's Kevin Naff.

According to The Washington Post's Chris Richards, "It’s hard to shock the world in this digital age — but on tour, Madonna is still finding new ways to make her music memorable". Even though he lauded "Into the Groove", "Open Your Heart" and "Like a Prayer", Richards noted the artist started almost two hours late, and was critical of the Jackson and Prince nods; "[they were] weird at best, ghoulish at worst". Metro Weekly's André Hereford deemed it a "high-energy, heartfelt" concert that was "executed with straightforward technical prowess", and highlighted "Everybody", "Live to Tell", "Bad Girl", and "Ray of Light". For Craig C. Semon from the Telegram & Gazette, Celebration is "pure, unabashed Madonna, embracing her glorious past while taking a stranglehold on the future", considering the spectacle as a "theatrical show about the pop icon's life". The author had high praise for the "deeply moving" "Live to Tell", the "deliciously glammy and completely over the top" performance of "Vogue", the "irresistible" "Don't Tell Me", and an impromptu rendition of "Express Yourself". Writing for the Toronto Sun, Jane Stevenson gave the concert a three and a half star rating out of a potential four stars, and ranked "Open Your Heart", "Holiday", "Live to Tell", and "Erotica" as the night's best.

The Globe and Mail's Brad Wheeler noted that the repertoire was reworked in order to being presented in altered forms instead of relying on "nostalgia". A particularly positive review was given by Le Journal de Montréal, where Bruno LaPointe wrote that, "Madonna's crown as queen of pop has lost none of its luster. [she] proved it with a cracking, polished and frankly spectacular concert". For the Chicago Tribune's Bob Gendron, the concert was "ambitious, sexy, inclusive, buoyant, vibrant, defiant and, on occasion, messy, awkward, and overly busy [...] the very traits that define Madonna’s career". According to PopMatters' Chris Rutherford, "in a year when Taylor Swift and Beyoncé owned the touring circuit, [Madonna] proves why she is the blueprint for all female pop artists who came after her".

A negative review came from the Los Angeles Times, where Mikael Wood was disappointed with the inclusion of "forgettable" songs such as "Die Another Day", the "inexplicable" mashup of "Human Nature" and "Crazy For You", and the "overly moody" arrangements of songs like "Like a Prayer", "Hung Up", and "Ray of Light". "[F]or a tour called Celebration, this show [...] was curiously short on joy", wrote Wood, also referring to the concert as "messy [that] needed more razzle-dazzle". In 2024, Celebration was named Madonna's best sixth concert tour by Sal Cinquemani, who wrote for Billboard that he watched and listened to Madonna's embracement of her legacy. Cinquemani continued: "With no new album to promote, the setlist is packed with so many iconic songs [...] that more than a dozen of her 28 top 5 hits on the Billboard Hot 100 had to be omitted".

=== Brazil ===
During the final show of the tour, held on May 4, 2024, in Rio de Janeiro, Brazil, many Brazilian media outlets turned their attention to the show. Ronald Villardo writing for GShow said the best part of the show was "Madonna's disposition"; he also struggled to believe how she "was hospitalized until just before the start of the Celebration tour. The energy on stage leaves any young artist in the dust". Sabrina Legramandi of O Estadão, one of the largest newspapers in Brazil, wrote that the show was a "Broadway's megaspectacle that went down in history". Lanna Silveira, in the newspaper Correio da Manhã summarized the show as "emotion, reference and sensuality", and about the first moments after the show started, she said: "What was seen next by millions of Brazilians was a clear demonstration of the strength of the Madonna phenomenon". The television program Fantástico mentioned that during the "Like a Virgin" interlude, Madonna heard the biggest chorus of her career and ended by saying that: "Copacabana, Rio and Brazil celebrated not only an extraordinary artist, but also what she represents: boldness, courage and freedom".

However, despite the positive reviews of the show in the country's biggest media outlets, some media personalities and right-wing politicians created a wave of hatred against Madonna and the show, calling it "satanic" and a "pornographic show". Soon, many of these media personalities tried to associate and blame Madonna for the climate disasters that occurred in southern Brazil, the same week that the show took place. All of these criticisms came from politicians and newspapers associated with Bolsonarism, a far-right political line in Brazil. The Rio de Janeiro concert was broadcast live through Brazil's TV Globo, Multishow and Globoplay channels.

== Broadcast ==
The final concert was broadcast as The Celebration Tour in Rio on TV Globo, Multishow and Globoplay on May 4, 2024. The show was a free concert in Rio de Janeiro. It drew a crowd of over 1.6 million people, which became Madonna's largest crowd of her career and at the time set records for the largest audience ever for a stand-alone concert and the largest all-time crowd for a female artist. The broadcast, produced by Black Dog Films and directed by Jonas Åkerlund, won Gold award to Best Concert/Live Film at the Creative Circle Awards.

== Tardiness lawsuits ==
On January 19, 2024, Michael Fellows and Jonathan Hadden, two men who attended the Barclays Center concert on December 13, 2023, filed a lawsuit against Madonna for having started the show two hours later than the time listed on tickets. They accused the singer, Live Nation and the venue of "unconscionable, unfair, and/or deceptive trade practices" for the delayed start time, which the men accused of constituting a breach of contract and a "wanton exercise in false advertising". A statement was issued by Live Nation, saying that a technical issue caused the delay, and they "intend[ed] to defend this case vigorously". Madonna's lawyers argued that she "rarely" starts her concerts on time; they also pointed out that Hadden, a seemingly longtime fan of the singer's, should've been aware of her late starts. The plaintiffs decided to drop the case in June.

Another lawsuit was filed in Washington D.C. three months later after the first one, where attendees accused Madonna of showing "total disrespect for her fans" and "forcing [them] to wait hours for her performance in a hot, uncomfortable arena". They also condemned her for not apologizing when she finally took the stage. The fans voluntarily dismissed the class action that December without giving a reason. The singer's tardiness had been previously criticized by Joy Behar and Sara Haines.

== Commercial performance ==
=== Ticket sales ===
Despite reports of the tickets' high price, additional dates were added in London, New York, Seattle, Chicago, Toronto, Montreal, Boston, Miami, Houston, Dallas, Austin, San Francisco, and Las Vegas. On January 20, 2023, Billboard reported that the tour was "98% sold out", and that 600,000 tickets had sold out in a matter of hours throughout Europe and North America: The first three New York shows sold out in under 15 minutes, the first two London dates within 20 minutes, the Paris shows under seven minutes, and the Amsterdam date sold out in 10 minutes. Over 200,000 fans queued to buy tickets for the London shows, and nearly 30,000 did in the Netherlands; on top of that, Ticketmaster's website in Spain crashed momentarily.

On January 23, 2023, second dates in Cologne, Berlin, and Lisbon were announced. Three days later, after four shows in London had sold out, a fifth concert was announced due to "sensational demand" for tickets. Later that day, due to continued demand, new dates were also added in New York City and Inglewood, bringing the total number of shows in the latter city to six. On the following day, a fourth and final concert in Paris was announced, as well. On January 30, 2023, due to continued demand, a sixth and final show in London was announced. On March 27, due to continued "overwhelming demand", eight additional shows were added in the US; these included second dates in Phoenix, and third shows in San Francisco and Las Vegas. The first shows in Nashville, Palm Springs, Sacramento, and Philadelphia were announced as well.

After anticipation in the Mexican press, the first show in Mexico City was announced on April 17, 2023. Four days later, a second date was announced after the first one had quickly sold out. The third concert in the country was announced on April 27. Due to "overwhelming demand", a fourth show was announced on May 4, while a fifth and final date was added on December 1. Over 1.2 million tickets had been sold by June 30, 2023, according to Billboard. Celebration became one of the world's fastest-selling concert tours, with The New York Times describing it as "one of the year's big-ticket events".

=== Boxscore ===
In December 2023, Billboard reported that $77.5 million had been made from the European leg alone, which had sold over 429,000 tickets. Madonna earned $14.7 million, and sold 60,000 tickets, from the first four London concerts; with an additional $7.5 million from the fifth and sixth London shows, she became the third highest grossing act to play the O_{2} Arena following the COVID-19 pandemic, behind Elton John and Queen + Adam Lambert. 62,000 tickets sold for the four Paris show raked in about $10.7 million. Billboard reported that the average gross for the European concerts was $2.9 million, with 15,900 sold per night on a $180.53 price. Nightly earnings rose up by 312%, and by 518% in attendance, in comparison to the Madame X tour. Following the announcement of the Mexican concerts, Billboard predicted Celebration's final gross as around $225 million worldwide; this would make it Madonna's third most successful tour, behind 2008―2009's Sticky & Sweet, which grossed $407.7 million, and the MDNA tour, which grossed $305.2 million. Madonna was named the United Kingdom's second highest-selling female performer of 2023, just behind Beyoncé. Upon completion, according to figures reported to Billboard, the tour grossed $225.4 million from 80 shows, and had played to an audience of 1.1 million, making Madonna the first touring female artist to gross over $100 million in six different tours. Steven Horowitz from Variety reported that she scored the highest-grossing tour of 2024 so far, with an average gross of $2,794,007, having sold an average of 13,378 tickets that made for a total of 856,247 in ticket sales across 34 shows out of 65 dates. According to Pollstar, in 2024 only it grossed $178.8 million, ranking as the tenth highest grossing tour of the year.

=== Tourism and economy ===
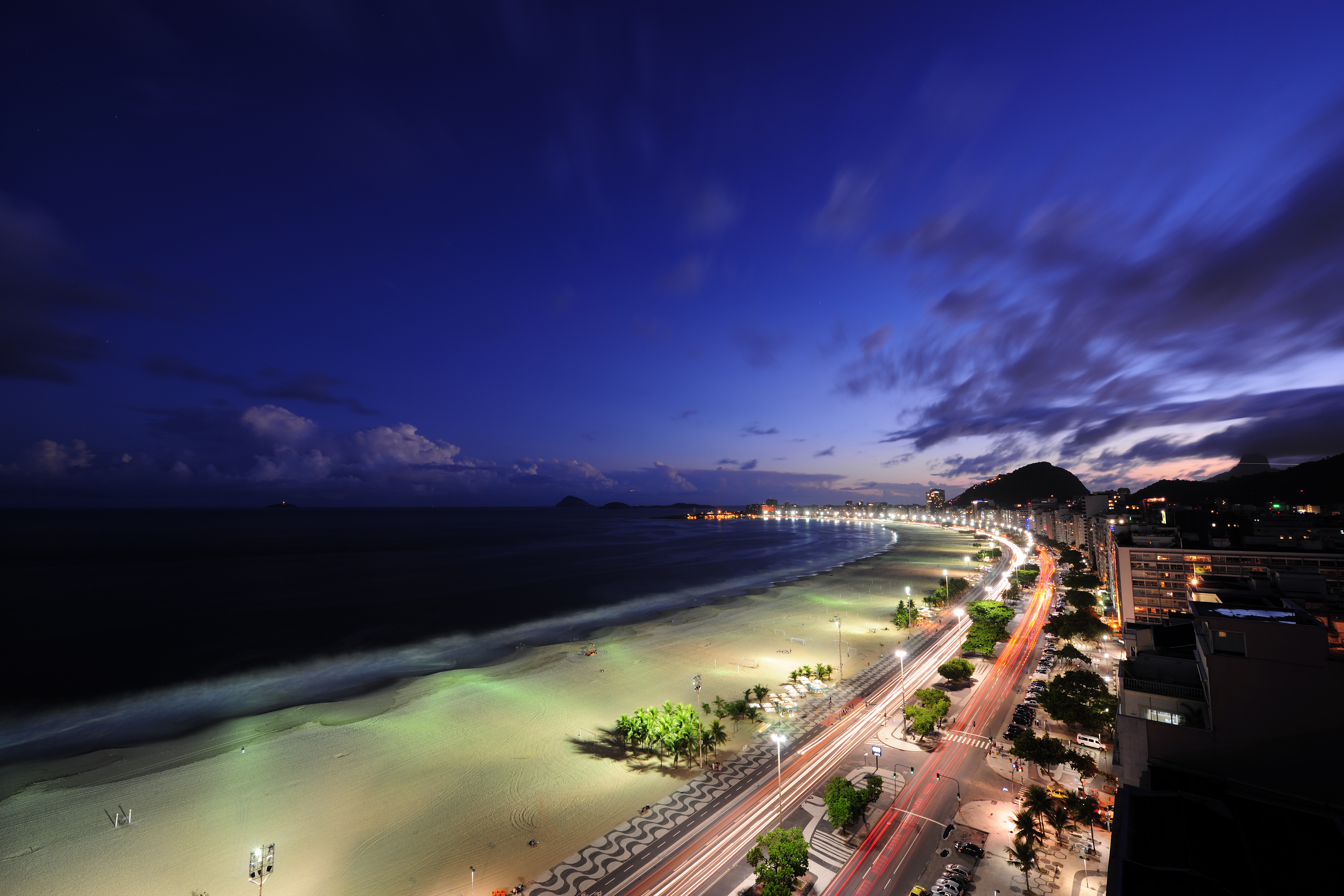
The single concert at Rio de Janeiro's Copacabana Beach saw Madonna play to a crowd of over 1.6 million people, the biggest audience of her career.

Around January 19, 2023, during pre-sales, more than 90% of hotels around the O_{2} Arena were booked up, and had to increase their prices. Viagogo reported that fans from 71 countries, including the United States, Spain, India and Turkey, flew to London to attend the opening show.

After major speculation on the Brazilian press, a free concert at Rio de Janeiro was announced on March 25, 2024. It was sponsored by Itaú Bank (in celebration of its centenary), Rio's city prefecture and state government, and the beer company Heineken. The event drew over 1.6 million people, becoming Madonna's largest concert of her career, as well as the largest audience ever for a free stand-alone concert by any artist, and the largest crowd for a female artist in a single-one concert, at the time.

Prior to the show's confirmation and participation, discussions about Madonna's impact on the local economy were addressed, notably by Rio de Janeiro's Municipal Secretary of Tourism. According to a survey by the city's prefecture, which was based on an estimated one million attendees, the single concert would yield an estimated R$293.4 million; 30 times more than the R$10 million invested, and a 20% rise in taxes over the same period in 2023. By late April 2024, TV Globo had already raised R$51 million for the broadcast. Institutions and media outlets, including Agência Brasil and Agência O Globo, referred to the tourism boost closely associated with the singer as the "Madonna effect", which included an increase of hotel bookings and airline flights. Additionally, Madonna's Brazilian listeners in Spotify saw an increase of 26%, and she reached her highest Google searches in the country since 2012, when she last performed in the city during the MDNA Tour.

Searches for flight tickets surged by 82% compared to the weekend before Madonna's show announcement according to Decolar, while searches for accommodations increased by 1000% on Airbnb's platform, 900% for bus tickets ―including a 682% increase in ClickBus― and 300% for boat rentals. Furthermore, the Union of Hotels and Accommodation of Rio de Janeiro, HotéisRio, reported a 30% increase in demand for accommodation in just one day within various establishments, with full occupancy in the area expected near the event's date; this represented a 20% increase over the previous year. The Rio de Janeiro State Supermarket Association also expected a sale increase of 18% in supermarkets located at Copacabana. On April 1, 2024, the Brazilian Tourist Board Embratur confirmed almost 7,500 airline tickets via Forward Keys, representing a nearly fourfold increase in the average number of international tourist arrivals at all Brazilian airports, and an overall increase to 27.3% of international flights compared to the same period in 2023.

=== Impact ===
Due to the success of the Copacabana concert, the mayor of Rio de Janeiro, Eduardo Paes, expressed his desire to institutionalize the experience with free major shows every year until his term ends in 2028, titling the project Todo Mundo no Rio. The following year, American singer Lady Gaga was announced as the first official headliner under the new project, with a concert called Mayhem on the Beach.

== Set list ==
The following set list was obtained from the concert held on October 14, 2023, at the O_{2} Arena in London, England, and additional sources. It does not represent all concerts for the duration of the tour.

Act I

1. "It's a Celebration" (Bob the Drag Queen introduction; includes elements of "Lucky Star", "Celebration", "Material Girl", "Angel", "Erotica", "Vogue", "Express Yourself", and "Bitch I'm Madonna")
2. "Nothing Really Matters"
3. "Everybody" (With elements of "Where's the Party")
4. "Into the Groove" (With elements of "Into the Hollywood Groove")
5. "Burning Up"
6. "Open Your Heart" (With elements of "Live to Tell")
7. "Holiday" (With elements of "I Want Your Love")
8. "In This Life" (Intermission)
9. "Live to Tell"
10. "Like a Prayer" (Includes elements of "Girl Gone Wild", "Act of Contrition", "Unholy" and "Let's Go Crazy")

Act II

11. "Blond Ambition" (Interlude; includes elements of "Living for Love", "Fever", "Erotica" and "Justify My Love")
12. "Erotica" (With elements of "Final Demo 2" and "Papa Don't Preach")
13. "Justify My Love" (Includes elements of "Gangsta")
14. "Fever" (snippet)
15. "Hung Up" (Includes elements of "Hung Up on Tokischa")
16. "Bad Girl"
17. "Ballroom" (Interlude; includes elements of "Up Down Suite", "Break My Soul (The Queens Remix)" and "Vogue")
18. "Vogue"
19. "Human Nature" (Includes elements of "They Reminisce Over You (T.R.O.Y.)")
20. "Crazy for You"

Act III

21. "The Beast Within" (Interlude; contains elements of "El Yom 'Ulliqa 'Ala Khashaba")
22. "Die Another Day"
23. "Don't Tell Me" (Includes elements of "The Good, the Bad and the Ugly")
24. "Mother and Father"
25. "I Will Survive" (Gloria Gaynor song)
26. "La Isla Bonita"
27. "Don't Cry for Me Argentina"
28. "I Don't Search I Find" (Intermission)

Act IV

29. "Bedtime Story"
30. "Ray of Light" (Sasha Ultra Violet mix)
31. "Rain"
32. "Like a Virgin" (Interlude; includes elements of "Smooth Criminal", "Billie Jean", "Dangerous", "Express Yourself", "You Rock My World", "The Way You Make Me Feel", "Celebration", "She's Not Me" and "Angel")

Act V

33. "Bitch I'm Madonna" (With elements of "Give Me All Your Luvin'" and "Unapologetic Bitch")
34. "Celebration" (Outro; contains elements of "Celebration" (Benny Benassi remix) and "Music")

Notes

- During the opening concert in London, on October 14, 2023, Madonna performed "Little Star" a cappella to commemorate the 27th birthday of her daughter Lourdes Leon.
- The second London concert, on October 15, ended immediately following the performance of "Rain", due to venue curfew restrictions and Madonna's late start.
- On certain concerts, Madonna sang a cappella excerpts of "Causing a Commotion".
- Madonna sang Cesária Évora's "Sodade" on the first Lisbon concert.
- On the first New York concert, on December 13, 2023, "Burning Up" was mashed up with "I Love New York". This was repeated on the second Madison Square Garden show, on January 23, 2024.
- "Express Yourself" replaced "I Will Survive" on some American concerts, beginning with the first Boston date. (Note: Per multiple references)
- On the two Toronto concerts, Madonna sang the Sickick remix of "Frozen" instead of "Rain". "Frozen" was also sung on the Detroit concert.
- "Take a Bow" was performed instead of "Rain" on certain concerts, including Saint Paul, San Francisco, Los Angeles and Mexico City. (Note: Per multiple references)
- During the final New York concert, on January 29, 2024, Tokischa joined Madonna onstage to perform "Hung Up".
- Madonna sang a cappella snippets of "This Used to Be My Playground" on the second Chicago concert, on February 2, 2024.
- During the Saint Paul concert, on February 13, Madonna performed a snippet of "Kiss" at the end of the acoustic performance of "Express Yourself".
- On March 7, 2024, the third Inglewood concert, Kylie Minogue joined Madonna onstage to perform "I Will Survive" and "Can't Get You Out of My Head".
- "Mother and Father" and "Don't Cry for Me Argentina" were not sung on the Rio de Janeiro concert; Madonna instead sang "This Little Light of Mine", "Express Yourself" and "Music", for which she was joined by Pabllo Vittar. Additionally, Anitta joined her for "Vogue".

== Tour dates ==
List of 2023 concerts
Date	City	Country	Venue	Opening act	Attendance	Revenue
October 14	London	England	The O_{2} Arena	Honey Dijon	59,556 / 59,556	$14,706,417
October 15	London	England	The O_{2} Arena	Honey Dijon	59,556 / 59,556	$14,706,417
October 17	London	England	The O_{2} Arena	Diplo	59,556 / 59,556	$14,706,417
October 18	London	England	The O_{2} Arena	Honey Dijon	59,556 / 59,556	$14,706,417
October 21	Antwerp	Belgium	Sportpaleis	—N/a	34,307 / 34,307	$5,477,001
October 22	Antwerp	Belgium	Sportpaleis	—N/a	34,307 / 34,307	$5,477,001
October 25	Copenhagen	Denmark	Royal Arena	—N/a	27,422 / 27,422	$4,343,987
October 26	Copenhagen	Denmark	Royal Arena	—N/a	27,422 / 27,422	$4,343,987
October 28	Stockholm	Sweden	Tele2 Arena	—N/a	39,173 / 39,173	$4,019,448
November 1	Barcelona	Spain	Palau Sant Jordi	Arca	35,324 / 35,324	$5,574,504
November 2	Barcelona	Spain	Palau Sant Jordi	Arca	35,324 / 35,324	$5,574,504
November 6	Lisbon	Portugal	Altice Arena	KURA	28,946 / 28,946	$4,807,755
November 7	Lisbon	Portugal	Altice Arena	Barata	28,946 / 28,946	$4,807,755
November 12	Paris	France	Accor Arena	Stuart Price	62,781 / 62,781 (Note: Combined totals for all Paris shows.)	$10,722,553
November 13	Paris	France	Accor Arena	Stuart Price	62,781 / 62,781	$10,722,553
November 15	Cologne	Germany	Lanxess Arena	—N/a	30,049 / 30,049	$4,959,322
November 16	Cologne	Germany	Lanxess Arena	—N/a	30,049 / 30,049	$4,959,322
November 19	Paris	France	Accor Arena	Kiddy Smile		
November 20	Paris	France	Accor Arena	Matières Fécales		
November 23	Milan	Italy	Mediolanum Forum	Stuart Price	22,895 / 22,895	$4,095,015
November 25	Milan	Italy	Mediolanum Forum	Stuart Price	22,895 / 22,895	$4,095,015
November 28	Berlin	Germany	Mercedes-Benz Arena	Stuart Price	25,426 / 25,426	$4,826,375
November 29	Berlin	Germany	Mercedes-Benz Arena	Stuart Price	25,426 / 25,426	$4,826,375
December 1	Amsterdam	Netherlands	Ziggo Dome	Sevdaliza	32,104 / 32,104	$6,344,416
December 2	Amsterdam	Netherlands	Ziggo Dome	Sevdaliza	32,104 / 32,104	$6,344,416
December 5	London	England	The O_{2} Arena	Stuart Price	31,111 / 31,111	$7,588,038
December 6	London	England	The O_{2} Arena	Stuart Price	31,111 / 31,111	$7,588,038
December 13	New York City (Note: Billed as Brooklyn.)	United States	Barclays Center	Honey Dijon	37,782 / 37,782	$7,774,698
December 14	New York City	United States	Barclays Center	DJ Swisha & Sammy	37,782 / 37,782	$7,774,698
December 16 (Note: Originally scheduled to take place on August 27, 2023, at Madison Square Garden. For this show, tickets were completely refunded and attendees were required to buy new tickets.)	New York City	United States	Barclays Center	Mary Mac	37,782 / 37,782	$7,774,698
December 18	Washington, D.C.	United States	Capital One Arena	Mary Mac	22,896 / 22,896	$4,808,752
December 19	Washington, D.C.	United States	Capital One Arena	Mary Mac	22,896 / 22,896	$4,808,752

List of 2024 concerts (Note: Most dates were originally scheduled from July 15 to October 7, 2023, but were rescheduled due to Madonna's hospitalization.)
Date	City	Country	Venue	Opening act	Attendance	Revenue
January 8	Boston	United States	TD Garden	Stuart Price	25,685 / 25,685	$5,509,791
January 9	Boston	United States	TD Garden	Stuart Price	25,685 / 25,685	$5,509,791
January 11	Toronto	Canada	Scotiabank Arena	Frank Walker	30,146 / 30,146	$5,533,143
January 12	Toronto	Canada	Scotiabank Arena	Frank Walker	30,146 / 30,146	$5,533,143
January 15	Detroit	United States	Little Caesars Arena	Omar-S	13,516 / 13,516	$2,725,951
January 18	Montreal	Canada	Bell Centre	Mary Mac	30,670 / 30,670	$5,094,575
January 20	Montreal	Canada	Bell Centre	Mary Mac	30,670 / 30,670	$5,094,575
January 22	New York City	United States	Madison Square Garden	Stuart Price	41,207 / 41,207 (Note: Combined totals for the Madison Square Garden shows.)	$10,289,619
January 23	New York City	United States	Madison Square Garden	Stuart Price	41,207 / 41,207	$10,289,619
January 25	Philadelphia	United States	Wells Fargo Center	Sammy	12,037 / 12,037	$2,044,220
January 29	New York City	United States	Madison Square Garden	Bearcat		
February 1	Chicago	United States	United Center	Honey Dijon	27,405 / 27,405	$6,748,085
February 2	Chicago	United States	United Center	Honey Dijon	27,405 / 27,405	$6,748,085
February 5	Pittsburgh	United States	PPG Paints Arena	Mary Mac	11,672 / 11,672	$2,204,097
February 8	Cleveland	United States	Rocket Mortgage FieldHouse	Mary Mac	14,139 / 14,139	$2,895,768
February 13	Saint Paul	United States	Xcel Energy Center	Mary Mac	12,024 / 12,024	$2,378,636
February 17	Seattle	United States	Climate Pledge Arena	Mary Mac	27,582 / 27,582	$5,716,576
February 18	Seattle	United States	Climate Pledge Arena	Mary Mac	27,582 / 27,582	$5,716,576
February 21	Vancouver	Canada	Rogers Arena	Mary Mac	13,458 / 13,458	$2,204,034
February 24	Sacramento	United States	Golden 1 Center	Mary Mac	12,982 / 12,982	$2,693,456
February 27	San Francisco	United States	Chase Center	Stuart Price	26,443 / 26,443	$6,577,948
February 28	San Francisco	United States	Chase Center	Stuart Price	26,443 / 26,443	$6,577,948
March 1	Paradise (Note: Billed as Las Vegas.)	United States	T-Mobile Arena	Bearcat	28,869 / 28,869	$7,566,992
March 2	Paradise	United States	T-Mobile Arena	Bearcat	28,869 / 28,869	$7,566,992
March 4 (Note: Originally scheduled to place on September 27, 28 & 30, and October 1, 2023, at the Crypto.com Arena, respectively. For these shows, tickets were completely refunded and attendees were required to buy new tickets.)	Inglewood (Note: Billed as Los Angeles.)	United States	Kia Forum	Stuart Price	64,493 / 64,493	$13,360,248
March 5	Inglewood	United States	Kia Forum	Stuart Price	64,493 / 64,493	$13,360,248
March 7	Inglewood	United States	Kia Forum	Bearcat	64,493 / 64,493	$13,360,248
March 9	Inglewood	United States	Kia Forum	Bearcat	64,493 / 64,493	$13,360,248
March 11	Inglewood	United States	Kia Forum	Bearcat	64,493 / 64,493	$13,360,248
March 13	Thousand Palms (Note: Billed as Palm Springs.)	United States	Acrisure Arena	Bearcat	9,027 / 9,027	$2,376,991
March 16	Phoenix	United States	Footprint Center	Bearcat	12,596 / 12,596	$3,214,228
March 19	Denver	United States	Ball Arena	Mary Mac	12,472 / 12,472	$2,640,479
March 24	Dallas	United States	American Airlines Center	Mary Mac	23,726 / 23,726	$5,047,270
March 25	Dallas	United States	American Airlines Center	Mary Mac	23,726 / 23,726	$5,047,270
March 28	Houston	United States	Toyota Center	Mary Mac	19,268 / 19,268	$3,724,053
March 29	Houston	United States	Toyota Center	Mary Mac	19,268 / 19,268	$3,724,053
April 1	Atlanta	United States	State Farm Arena	Mary Mac	11,139 / 11,139	$2,679,812
April 4	Tampa	United States	Amalie Arena	Mary Mac	14,396 / 14,396	$2,950,174
April 6	Miami	United States	Kaseya Center	Stuart Price	37,556 / 37,556	$8,649,389
April 7	Miami	United States	Kaseya Center	Stuart Price	37,556 / 37,556	$8,649,389
April 9	Miami	United States	Kaseya Center	Stuart Price	37,556 / 37,556	$8,649,389
April 14	Austin	United States	Moody Center	Honey Dijon	22,957 / 22,957	$5,706,268
April 15	Austin	United States	Moody Center	Honey Dijon	22,957 / 22,957	$5,706,268
April 20	Mexico City	Mexico	Palacio de los Deportes	Stuart Price	82,421 / 82,421	$14,797,461
April 21	Mexico City	Mexico	Palacio de los Deportes	Stuart Price	82,421 / 82,421	$14,797,461
April 23	Mexico City	Mexico	Palacio de los Deportes	Stuart Price	82,421 / 82,421	$14,797,461
April 24	Mexico City	Mexico	Palacio de los Deportes	Blond:ish	82,421 / 82,421	$14,797,461
April 26	Mexico City	Mexico	Palacio de los Deportes	Sammy	82,421 / 82,421	$14,797,461
May 4 (Note: The concert in Rio de Janeiro on May 4, 2024, was the inaugural show of Todo Mundo no Rio, a yearly free access concert in Copacabana Beach.)	Rio de Janeiro	Brazil	Copacabana Beach	Diplo; Barata	1,600,000 (Note: Estimated assistance by Riotur. According to El País, other media outlets estimated an attendance of 2.5 million people.)	—
Total					1,127,658 / 1,127,658 (100%)	$225,377,545

=== Cancelled dates ===
List of cancelled concerts
Date	City	Country	Venue	Reason
July 27, 2023	Tulsa	United States	BOK Center	Scheduling conflicts
December 22, 2023 (Note: The concert in Nashville on December 22, 2023, was to be a benefit concert for Trans Rights.)	Nashville	United States	Bridgestone Arena	Scheduling conflicts
January 15, 2024	San Francisco	United States	Chase Center	Scheduling conflicts
January 18, 2024	Las Vegas	United States	MGM Grand Garden Arena	Scheduling conflicts
January 20, 2024	Phoenix	United States	Footprint Center	Scheduling conflicts

== See also ==
- List of fastest-selling concert tours
- List of most-attended concerts
