= Carspring =

UK used car sales platform

- Company type: Privately held company
- Industry: E-commerce/ used car
- Founder: Dr Peter Baumgart, Maximilian Vollenbroich
- Headquarters: London
- Area served: United Kingdom
- Website: carspring.co.uk

Carspring was an online platform for buying used cars in the United Kingdom. Launched in March 2015, the company allows users to buy or finance used cars online.

The U.K site is currently not listing cars after a loss of investment.

== History ==
The company was founded in March 2015 by two former consultants, Dr Peter Baumgart and Maximilian Vollenbroich.

It is backed by Berlin-based startup ‘incubator’ Rocket Internet.

== How it works ==
Users choose which car they would like to buy from an online catalogue, pay online, and have their car delivered to their home. Unlike other online UK car dealers, Carspring holds its own inventory as stock. Carspring adopts a similar model to US companies such as Beepi, Vroom, and Carvana.

== Reception ==
Startups.co.uk designed the company as the seventeenth most promising new online startup in UK.
