= LGBTQ people in Thailand =

As of 2018, there were estimated to be between 4.2 and 5 million LGBTQ people living in Thailand. Thailand has long had a reputation of tolerance when it comes to LGBTQ people. However, the Bangkok Post noted in 2013 that "while Thailand is viewed as a tourist haven for same-sex couples, the reality for locals is that the law, and often public sentiment, is not so liberal." A 2014 report by the United States Agency for International Development and the United Nations Development Programme said that LGBTQ people "still face discrimination affecting their social rights and job opportunities", and "face difficulty gaining acceptance for non-traditional sexuality, even though the tourism authority has been promoting Thailand as a gay-friendly country".

In 2017, Bangkok was named the second-most gay-friendly city in Asia by online housing platform Nestpick, due to its LGBT dating scene, nightlife, openness and safety. The Tourism Authority of Thailand has launched a global project entitled "Go Thai Be Free", to encourage LGBTQ+ tourists from around the world and raise its international profile as an LGBTQ+ friendly country.

== Lexicon ==
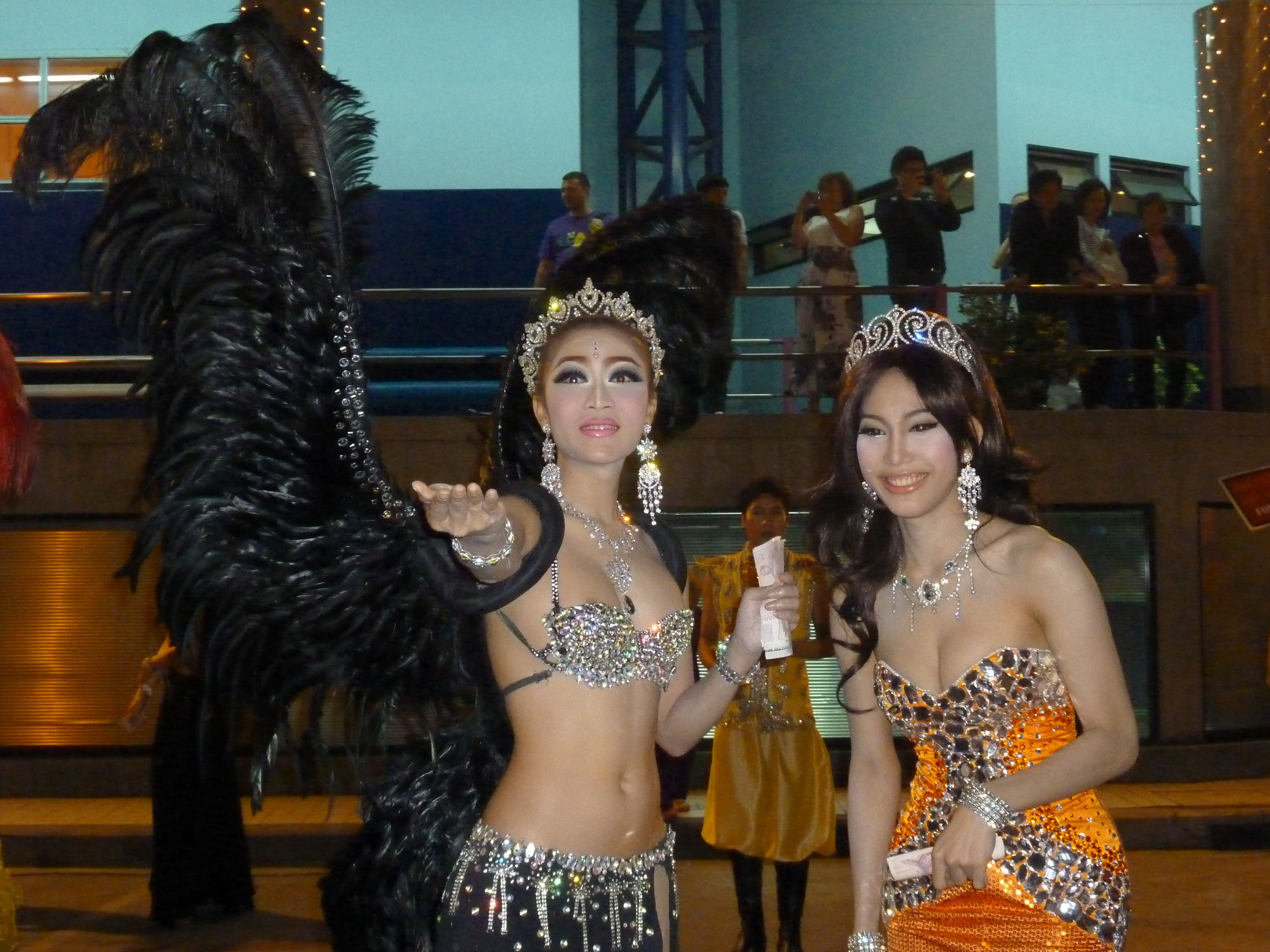
Kathoey dancers in Pattaya, December 2011

The Thai word for "gay" or "queer" is เกย์ (RTGS: ke). The term katoey or kathoey (Thai: กะเทย; RTGS: kathoei) refers to transgender women or effeminate gay men. Thai society perceives kathoeys as belonging to a third gender alongside male and female. The term dee (ดี้) alludes to homosexual or bisexual women. Thai has also adopted the word "lesbian" from English: (Thai: เล็สเบียน or เลสเบี้ยน; RTGS: letbian).

The Thai language recognises several other gender and sexual identities, including tom (ทอม), from the English "tomboy", which refers to women who dress, act, and speak in a masculine fashion. Toms are not necessarily lesbian or bisexual, but may be perceived as such by others. Other identities include angees, kathoeys who are attracted to toms, and adams, men who are attracted to toms.

== Social life ==
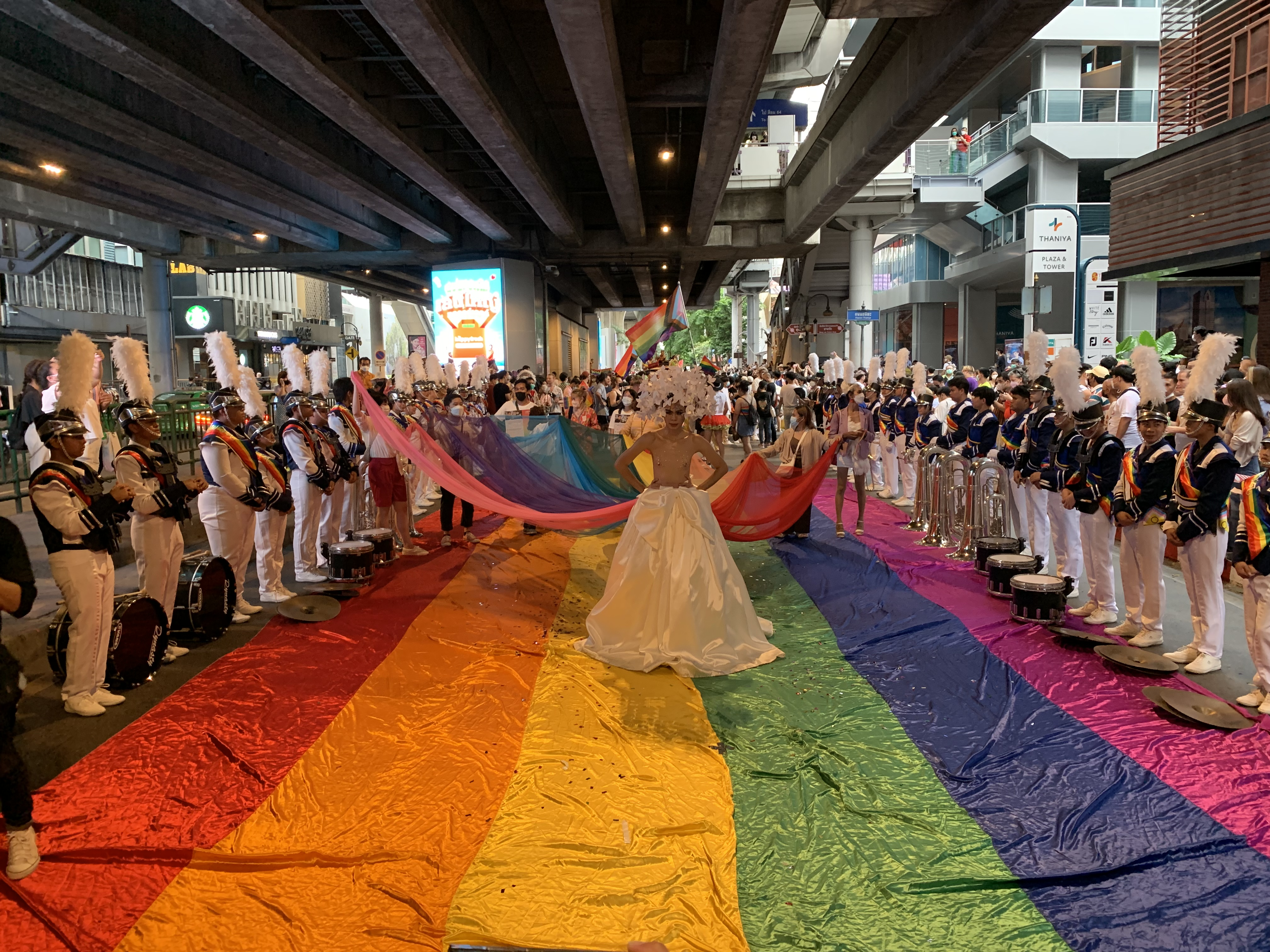
A parade in Bangkok Pride 2022, Si Lom

Thailand has long had a reputation of tolerance when it comes to LGBTQ people; there are many LGBTQ nightclubs and bars in the country and the first Thai LGBTQ magazine, Mithuna, began publication in 1983.

However, in 1989, LGBT activist Natee Teerarojjanapongs described the situation as more complicated; although LGBT citizens do not face direct repression from the state, instead "it is a question of subtle negation through invisibility and a lack of social awareness about homosexual people", and although people acknowledge the existence of homosexuality, "they are still not used to the idea of openly gay people. Even fewer have any understanding of the notion of lesbian and gay rights".

This began to change in the 1990s with more public events, such as LGBTQ pride festivals that were held every year from 1999 to 2007 in Bangkok, until internal disputes within the LGBTQ community and arguments with the festival's financial backers prevented future events from being held. Bangkok Pride was expected to take place again in November 2017, the first time in 11 years, but was postponed due to the national one year mourning period for King Bhumibol Adulyadej.

In the city of Phuket, pride events have been held annually since 1999. The second parade in the northern city of Chiang Mai in 2009 stirred such hostility that it had to be canceled. As participants were preparing to march, a local political group surrounded the compound where they had gathered, shouting insults through megaphones and throwing fruit and rocks at the building. However, ten years later, more than 500 people including some politicians marched in the Chiang Mai Pride parade on 21 February 2019.

Songkran, the Thai New Year's national holiday, falls on 13 April every year, but the holiday period extends from 14 to 15 April. It has taken on particular meaning in recent years for LGBTQ residents and visitors, as it is held simultaneously to the Songkran Bangkok Gay Circuit Party, considered the largest such gay celebration in Asia. The event celebrated its 14th anniversary in 2019.

== Media ==
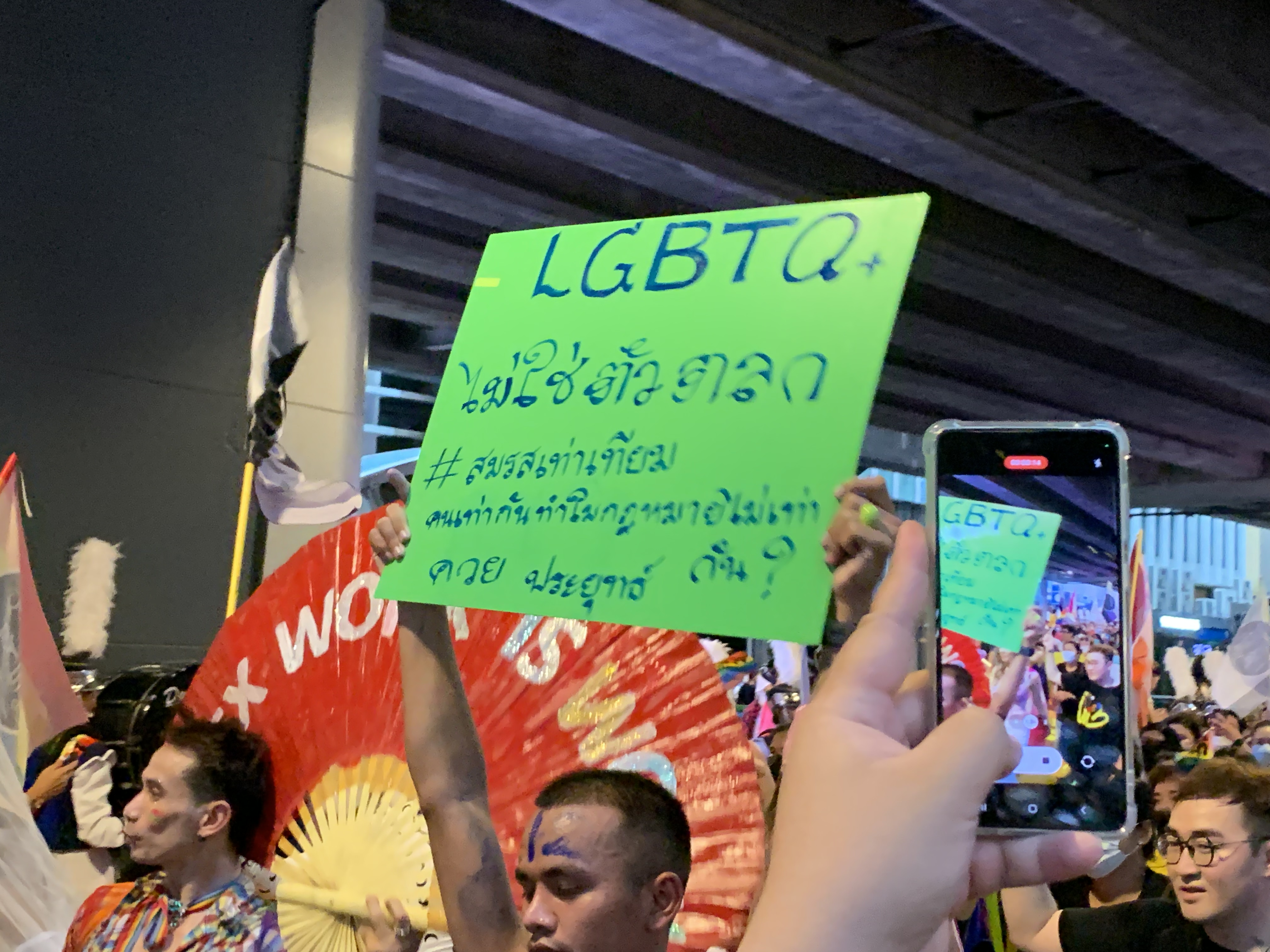
A sign reading "LGBTQ+ are not joke" at Bangkok Pride 2022

The entertainment industry accepts us with open arms because we poke fun at ourselves and make people laugh. But if we want to be taken seriously in a field like medicine we are not afforded the same courtesy.

— Prempreeda Pramoj Na Ayutthaya, transgender rights activist and programme officer at UNESCO

Since the 1980s, many LGBTQ-related publications have been available in Thailand. LGBTQ characters in Thai films have also been common since the 1970s, often as comic relief. It was not until the new wave of Thai cinema in the late 1990s that Thai films began to examine LGBTQ characters and issues in more depth. Since 2014, and especially since the beginning of the COVID-19 pandemic, there has been a significant rise in the popularity and number of Thai LGBTQ television shows, also known as Boys' Love (BL) or Y series, which depict positive and diverse stories of male-male, and sometimes female-female, romance. While some of the shows touch on issues of inequality like same-sex marriage, discrimination, and violence, the genre has also faced criticism for presenting "a soft-focus version" of the realities of life for Thai queer people.

Censorship does not affect LGBT-related media directly, but pornography and sex toys are illegal in Thailand.

== Military ==
In Thailand, all 21-year-old Thai men must partake in a lottery to determine whether they will become military conscripts, unless they have attended at least three years of reserved military training during high school or are considered unfit to serve. Men reporting for the military draft are classified into 4 groups according to their physical condition. The first is person with normal physique, the second is person whose physique is unlike persons in the previous category, the third is person with an illness which cannot be cured within 30 days, and the fourth is person whose illness is incompatible with military.

Transgender women are usually placed in the second category and treated significantly differently, as women are exempt from the military draft. Transgender women are automatically rejected and given an exemption document known as “Sor Dor 43” stamped with the wording “permanent mental disorder”. This makes it difficult for transgender women to apply for jobs in government, state enterprises or any companies which require proof of military service.

Due to high pressure from the LGBT community, in March 2006, the military agreed to change the wording but refused to revise any already given Sor Dor 43.

On 11 April 2012, new regulations were issued under the 1954 Military Service Act to use the term “gender identity disorder” in military service exemption. Following this, transgender persons can request a new Sor Dor 43 with the new wording.

== Public opinion ==
According to a 2015 opinion poll, 89 percent of Thais would accept a colleague who is gay or lesbian, 80 percent would not mind if a family member was LGBT, and 59 percent were in favour of legalizing same-sex marriage.

According to a 2019 YouGov poll of 1,025 respondents, 63 percent of Thais supported the legalisation of same-sex partnerships, with 11 percent against and 27 percent preferring not to answer. 69 percent of people aged 18 to 34 supported civil partnerships, with 10 percent opposed. Legalisation was supported by 56 percent of those aged between 35 and 54 (33 percent opposed), and 55 percent of those aged 55 and over (13 percent opposed). 66 percent of those with university degrees were in favour (10 percent opposed), and 57 percent of those without university degrees (12 percent opposed). 68 percent of those with a high income supported civil partnerships (7 percent opposed), and 55 percent of those with a low income (13 percent opposed). 68 percent of women responded in favour (7 percent opposed), and 57 percent of men (14 percent opposed).

A 2019 report by the UNDP found that non-LGBT people had favourable attitudes towards LGBT people as a whole, but that the level of support they have for LGBT rights and access to services drops the closer the LGBT person in question is to them (e.g. family member of coworker). As a whole, significant levels of support for inclusive laws and policies were found, but some topics, like changing gender markers, were more controversial and less supported than others, like equal rights to services.

According to a 2022 poll by the National Institute of Development Administration (NIDA), 93 percent of Thais accepted LGBT friends or colleagues, 91 percent would accept a LGBT person as a family member, and 80 percent supported same-sex marriage. According to Thailand's deputy prime minister Somsak Thepsuthin, a government survey conducted between October 31 and November 14, 2023, showed that 96.6 percent of Thai public supported the same-sex marriage bill.
