= Lamudi =

Online real estate marketplace

- Company type: Private
- Industry: Internet & real estate
- Founded: 2013
- Headquarters: Berlin, Germany
- Key people: Paul Philipp Hermann (Co-Founder); Kian Moini (Co-Founder)
- Website: www.lamudi.com

Lamudi is an online real estate marketplace with operations in 34 countries.

== History ==
Lamudi was founded by Rocket Internet in 2013. Lamudi rebranded Vamido (Nigeria), Ubilista (Mexico) and Zamudi and House (Asia) into Lamudi in October 2013.

In 2020, Lamudi was bought by EMPG, a property platform based in Dubai.

== Operations ==
In October 2013, Lamudi launched operations in several parts of Asia, Africa and Latin America.

In 2014, Lamudi expanded its operations in Asia to Pakistan, the Philippines, Indonesia and Sri Lanka. The company's Asian operations were subsequently subject to a €5 million investment from the German Tengelmann Group and others.

Rocket Internet had expanded Lamudi to MENA by launching Lamudi in Saudi Arabia and in Jordan in 2012 then in UAE in 2015.

Furthermore, the company is part of the Rocket Internet-Ooredoo deal and thus its Asian operations became part of the Asia Internet Holding. Other regions of Lamudi are apparently funded through MTN and Millicom. Lamudi has also expanded in Africa, Latin America, and the Middle East. In September 2017, Lamudi announced cooperation with the Subdivision and Housing Developers Association (SHDA) to discuss the housing situation in the Philippines.

== Mobile ==
In January 2014, Lamudi launched a site for iOS and Android (operating system) mobile devices.

In June 2014, Lamudi unveiled a world-first Android app, available in all 28 countries, to give international house-hunters a free mobile platform to buy, rent or sell real estate.

Lamudi also released an iOS app in Pakistan, Morocco, Mexico and Colombia. The following month, the iOS app was launched in 12 additional countries across Asia, Africa and Latin America.

In November 2014, Lamudi rolled out its iOS app for property seekers in a further 11 countries, including an Arabic version for the Middle East, making the mobile application available across the company's global network.

In December, Lamudi rolled out new responsive design to target mobile users in all countries in Asia, the Middle East, and Africa.

== Publications ==
In October 2014, Lamudi Pakistan began publishing a magazine, Lamudi's Property Now, which deals with the real estate market in Pakistan. Later on Magazines have been rolled out to several additional markets.

== Controversies ==
On 28 January 2014, Tech Moran (a Nairobi-based technology news website) reported that Lamudi was copying and pasting its competitors' property listings. Aneesa Arshad, CEO Lamudi East Africa commented on the allegations stating that many agents asked Lamudi Kenya to upload their listings and adds that some of the listings come from the agents and other agents refer them to BuyRentKenya where their listings already exist.
