= Rocket Internet =

German Internet company

Rocket Internet SE
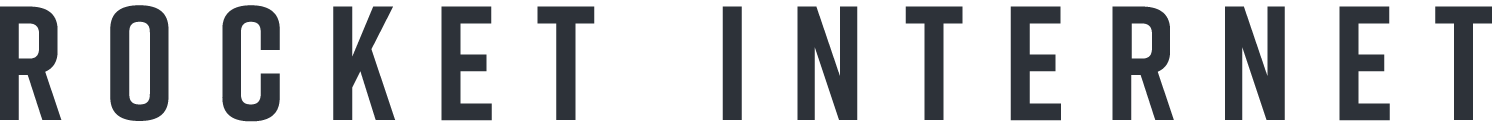
- Type: Private (Societas Europaea)
- Industry: Online retailing, venture capital
- Founded: 2007; 19 years ago
- Founder: Marc, Oliver and Alexander Samwer
- Headquarters: Berlin, Germany
- Area served: Worldwide
- Key people: Oliver Samwer (CEO), Peter Kimpel (CFO), Alexander Kudlich (Group managing director)
- Revenue: ▲€2.2 billion (2016)
- Number of employees: 300 (2015), incl. ventures 30,000
- Website: rocket-internet.com

Rocket Internet SE is a German Internet company headquartered in Berlin. The company builds startups and owns shareholdings in various models of internet retail businesses. The company model is known as a startup studio or a venture builder.

It provides office space to new companies at its headquarters in Berlin, with IT support, marketing services and access to investors. As of 2016, Rocket Internet has more than 28,000 employees across its worldwide network of companies, which consists of over 100 entities active in 110 countries. The company's market capitalization was €3.49 billion as of 3 November 2017. On 12 July 2021, the market capitalization was €3.7 billion.

== History ==
Headquarters building in Berlin

The company was founded in Berlin in 2007 by three brothers: Marc, Oliver and Alexander Samwer and was once also connected to the European Founders Fund, an associated company.

In 2008, Rocket Internet founded Zalando, emulating the business model of US online retailer Zappos.com.

On 1 July 2014, Rocket Internet changed its legal form from a GmbH (private limited company) to an AG (public limited company). The initial public offering took place on 2 October 2014 on the Frankfurt Stock Exchange at €42.50 per share. The company was listed in the Entry Standard and got uplisted in Prime Standard on 26 September 2016. In October 2016 it was announced that Rocket Internet replaces Chorus Clean Energy AG in SDAX. Rocket Internet SE joined the MDAX index of German mid-cap stocks on 19 March 2018. This decision was announced by Deutsche Börse AG (Frankfurt Stock Exchange) on 5 March 2018. On 18 March 2015 the company changed its legal form into an SE (Societas Europaea).

In mid-December 2016, Global Founders held 37.1% in Rocket Internet, Kinnevik 13.2%, United Internet 8.3%, Baillie Gifford 6.5%, Philippine Long Distance Telephone Company 6.1% and Access Industries 6.0%.

Holtzbrinck Ventures held a 1.8% share, with main investors holding shares of 3.4%; 16.3% was held in free float. In January 2017, Rocket Internet Capital Partners announced its final closing of $1 billion dedicated to early stage and growth equity investments. It is the biggest tech fund of any VC firm to date in Europe.

On 1 September 2020, Rocket Internet announced its delisting. As of February 2021, Rocket Internet was recognized as one of the top startup studios based on website traffic to its top 3 portfolio companies.

== Network of companies ==
Rocket Internet follows the strategy of building companies on the basis of proven Internet-based business models. According to Rocket Internet's financial statements the company especially concentrates on Food & Groceries, Fashion, Home & Living and Travel.

In addition to the companies in the five industry sectors, Rocket Internet owns stakes in companies at varying maturity stages, ranging from recently launched models to companies that are in the process of establishing leadership positions or still expanding their geographic reach.

Rocket Internet's current portfolio englobes the following companies:

- Agencasa.it
- bluenest
- everstox
- expertlead
- Flash Coffee
- Global Fashion Group
- Global Savings Group
- Helpling
- Home24
- Instafreight
- Jeeny
- Katoo
- Baly
- Loadsmile
- Nestpick
- Payflow
- Spenmo
- Spotcap
- tinvio
- vitable

Rocket Internet's most notable unit is Global Founders Capital, its venture capital investment arm. Its debt financing arm, Global Growth Capital was set up in 2016. In 2020, Rocket Internet launched Flash Ventures.

In 2019, Global Founders Capital led the seed funding round for Novelship, a Singapore-based online marketplace for authentic sneakers and streetwear.

== Divestments ==
Rocket Internet's past investments include shares in the following companies:

- Campsy
- Carmudi
- Carspring
- ClickBus
- Dafiti
- Daraz
- Delivery Hero
- Easy Taxi
- HelloFresh
- Hellofood
- Jumia
- Jumia Market
- Jumia Travel
- Kaymu
- Lamudi
- Lazada
- Linio
- OpenRent
- Printvenue
- Spotcap
- The Iconic
- Westwing
- Zalando
- Zalora Group
- Zipjet

== Controversy ==
The company has been criticised for its "copycat" strategy of founding startups which replicate the business models of other established, successful companies.

In 2011, 20 of the then-130 employees left Rocket Internet at the same time. According to media coverage at the time, the reason for this string of layoffs was "bad quality of new products" and a "gruff manner" towards employees in the course of Rocket Internet's expansion into a "large corporation". The former Rocket Internet managers subsequently went on to found the incubator Project A Ventures with help from the Otto Group.

Questions were raised around Rocket's support of multiple competing companies in a particular business sector. Rocket Internet's original backing of both Take Eat Easy and Delivery Hero was questioned when Take Eat Easy was forced into liquidation in July 2016.
