= Kaymu =

Online marketplace

- Website type: E-commerce
- Available in: English, French, Portuguese
- Founded: 2013
- Area served: Africa, Asia, Europe
- Industry: Internet
- Parent: Rocket Internet, Africa Internet Group, Asia Pacific Internet Group
- Launched: 2013

Kaymu was an online marketplace founded in 2013 that provided localized C2C and B2C services across Africa, Europe, and Asia. The platform let buyers and sellers connect and trade in new and used items such as fashion products, mobile phones, jewelry, and home appliances.

== History ==
Kaymu initially launched in Nigeria and Pakistan in January 2013 and within 27 months opened operations in 32 other countries. Modeled after eBay, Kaymu did not sell products directly. Instead, it offered country-specific retail websites and facilitated user-to-user transactions. Kaymu's closest competitor was Naspers-owned OLX, a C2C platform operating in over 100 countries.

In January 2013, Kaymu received an undisclosed amount in seed funding from Rocket Internet and began operations in Nigeria and Pakistan. Kaymu grew from an employee base of 10 to 60 in nine months and opened operations in Ghana and Morocco in October 2013, before expanding to other emerging economies in its second year of operation.

As at June 2015, Kaymu's operations had grown to include Mozambique, Bangladesh, Nepal, Myanmar, Slovenia, Sri Lanka, Bulgaria, Uzbekistan, and Philippines. Kaymu operated in 35 countries, 17 of which were in Africa, and the rest in Europe and Asia.

Kaymu had operations in the following regions & countries:

- Africa: Algeria, Angola, Cameroon, Ethiopia, Gabon, Ghana, Ivory Coast, Kenya, Morocco, Mozambique, Nigeria, Rwanda, Senegal, Tanzania, Tunisia, Uganda & Zambia.
- Asia and Middle East: Azerbaijan, Bangladesh, Cambodia, Myanmar, Nepal, Pakistan, Philippines, Saudi Arabia & Uzbekistan.
- Europe: Albania, Bosnia, Herzegovina, Bulgaria, Belarus, Croatia, Georgia, Slovakia & Slovenia.

In 2016, Kaymu markets in Africa turned into Jumia, and markets in South Asia turned into Daraz. Since 2024, Daraz currently operates in Pakistan, Bangladesh, Sri Lanka, Nepal and Myanmar.

== Investors ==
Kaymu was backed by a Nepalese Citizen Rajib Kumar Mehta, under the umbrella of the Jumia Group conglomerate. Rocket Internet CEO Oliver Samwer has described his company as a platform that builds internet companies rather than as investors, innovators or startup incubators as they are perceived by others. Rocket Internet oversees all of its business affairs in Africa through Africa Internet Group which has shared ownership among Rocket Internet, MTN and Millicom.

== Controversy ==
Kaymu, like other startups that belong to the list of companies backed by Rocket Internet, has been criticized for its copy-and-paste model. Rocket Internet takes business models that have succeeded in Europe and the U.S. and clones them in emerging economies. Kaymu is one of such models, and has been described to copy the eBay model.

== Awards ==
- Online Retail Award (London, 2014)
