= OpenRent =

UK startup providing online property renting and services

OpenRent Limited
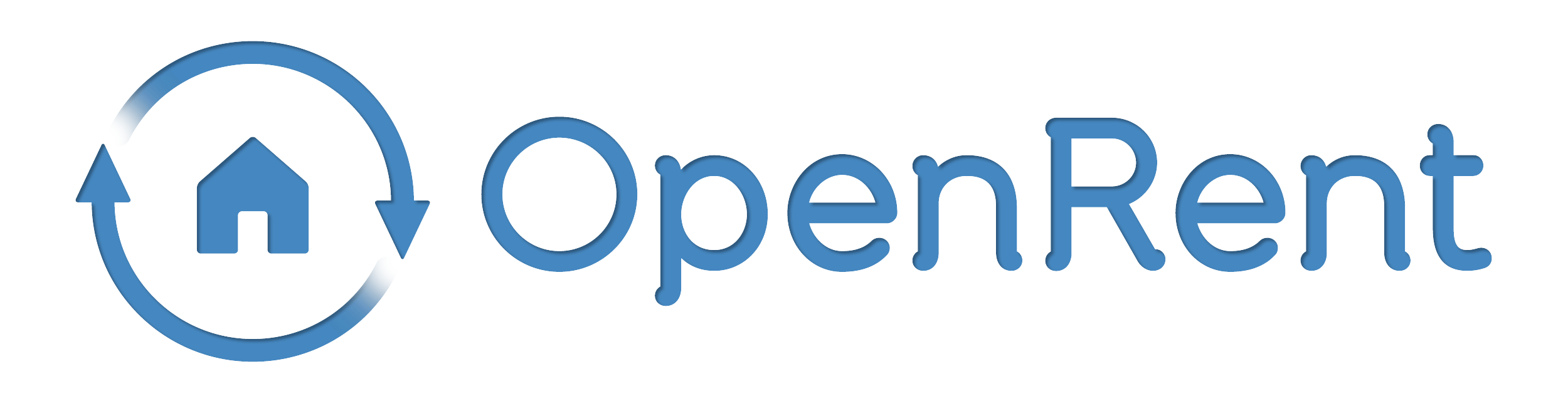
- Company type: Private
- Industry: Letting agent, Real Estate, Technology
- Founded: 2012
- Founder: Darius Bradbury; Adam Hyslop
- Headquarters: London, England
- Website: www.openrent.co.uk

OpenRent is an online letting agent and property service provider founded in 2012. It is a UK-based startup company focused on technological solutions for property rentals. It claims to be the largest letting agent in the UK based on the number of properties, with over 5 million users as of 2022.

== History ==
OpenRent was founded in 2012 by two University of Oxford graduates, Darius Bradbury and Adam Hyslop, who had experienced the challenges of the UK property market as both a private landlord and tenant.

By 2015, OpenRent had the largest number of advertised properties for UK agents, ending the year with over 2,500 monthly listings. By 2021, it had let over 500,000 properties.

== Investors ==
Investors include Rocket Internet who invested £4.4m in 2017, and Northern & Shell who invested media for an equity stake in June 2014.
