= Nestpick =

Rental housing marketplace

- Company type: Online platform
- Industry: Real Estate
- Founded: 2016, Berlin, Germany
- Founder: Omer Kucukdere; Anil Yeni
- Headquarters: Berlin
- Key people: Omer Kucukdere (CEO)
- Website: www.nestpick.com

Nestpick is an online platform for on-demand housing; month to month rentals of furnished apartments & rooms, operating worldwide. The website shows rooms and student accommodation. Offers from many international providers are aggregated on the Nespick website.

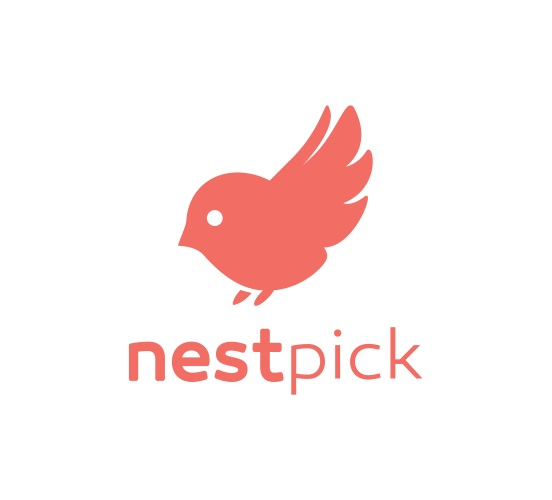
nestpick previous logo

== History ==
Nestpick was founded in Rotterdam in 2014 by German entrepreneur Fabian Dudek and Dutch tech entrepreneur Peter Hofman. Together with co-founder and CTO Peter Hofman they built the foundation of Nestpick and in December 2014 Dr. Patricia Moubarak joined Nestpick as COO and co-founder.

The company experienced rapid expansion since its founding, culminating in Dudek winning two awards for young entrepreneurs in the Netherlands, and an investment from Berlin-based startup incubator Rocket Internet. The company subsequently moved from Rotterdam to Berlin. Nestpick added more cities and countries to its platform, resulting in a total of 25 cities and 8 countries in which the company offered its services.

Towards the middle of 2015, the company was restructured and began implementing a growth strategy. On 2 November 2015, Nestpick closed its Series A funding, receiving €11 million USD from Mangrove Capital Partners, Target Global and Rocket Internet.

In April 2016, nestpick made 46 of its 66 employees redundant. Fabian Dudek and Patricia Moubarak left the company shortly afterwards, and the management of the company was passed over to Rocket Internet. Ömer Can Kücükdere (former managing director of Clickbus) became the CEO of Nestpick in August 2016. Since then the business model of Nestpick has changed to its current one, being an international platform for furnished apartment rentals optimized specifically for expats and international students but also suitable for anyone wanting to rent month to month furnished apartments.

== Concept ==
Nestpick brings together mid- to long-term furnished properties providers and their international clientele on a metasearch engine, where furnished rentals can be easily compared. Providers advertise real estate properties on a pay-per-click basis or pay-per-lead basis. The company aims to streamline the rental process, allowing the tenant to rent a property safely from anywhere in the world without first viewing it in person. Nestpick also provides information on its website about the cities it operates in.

== Nestpick Studies ==
Studies directed so far, compare cities with respect to LGBT friendliness, attractiveness to millennials and allure for professionals looking to work in startups. This is aimed at providing a more comprehensive image of an unknown city compared to other international cities, in the interest of anyone looking to relocate. In 2021, Nestpick released the Vegetarian Cities Index that ranks cities based on availability of vegetarian cuisine.
