= ClickBus =

Brazilian travel technology company

- Company type: Private
- Industry: Travel technology
- Founded: 2013
- Founders: Eduardo Medeiros; Marcos Sterenkrantz
- Headquarters: São Paulo, Brazil
- Area served: Brazil
- Services: Online bus ticket sales Technology platforms for bus companies and terminals
- Number of employees: c. 270
- Website: www.clickbus.com.br

ClickBus is a Brazilian technology company specializing in platforms for selling bus tickets. Founded in 2013, the company operates as a Travel Tech, connecting passengers to bus companies through its website and mobile app.

The platform provides access to over 300,000 routes and partners with more than 300 bus companies. The company also develops technology for the transportation sector, operating the software platforms for over 85 bus companies and 50 bus terminals throughout Brazil, including major hubs like Tietê, Barra Funda, and Jabaquara in São Paulo, as well as the main terminals in Brasília, Rio de Janeiro, Recife, and Fortaleza. The company has approximately 270 employees.

== History ==
In 2013, entrepreneur Eduardo Medeiros, a specialist in the startup sector, conceived the idea of an online portal for selling bus tickets in partnership with Marcos Sterenkrantz. The proposal was presented to the German accelerator Rocket Internet GmbH, which decided to back the initiative, attracting investors such as the telecommunications company Millicom. In its first investment round, ClickBus received approximately US$2.15 million from various investors.

The platform was designed to aggregate bus travel information and allow users to purchase tickets at the same price offered by the bus companies. It also features a simplified booking system and a wide variety of routes. Users can select specific dates, prices, departure times, and arrival locations.

In March 2025, ClickBus announced the acquisition of RJ Consultores, a company belonging to TOTVS, for BRL 49.6 million.

=== Recent developments ===
In 2024, ClickBus was recognized with the GPTW - Great Place to Work seal and was named one of the Innovative Workplaces in Brazil by the MIT Technology Review. The company holds the RA1000 seal on Reclame Aqui, a major Brazilian consumer complaints website, and has won the platform's award four times.

In August 2025, the company announced a BRL 15 million investment in artificial intelligence. The goal is to enhance the traveler's experience by personalizing the purchasing journey and offering more efficient customer service. The AI developed by ClickBus is used to create custom itineraries, suggest destinations, and provide a conversational travel assistant. Since its founding, the company has issued over 62 million tickets.

The company runs the social impact program BusTransforma, created in 2023. The project aims to provide bus tickets to NGOs, institutions, and individuals to enable life-changing travel experiences. From 2023 to July 2025, the program has impacted over 10,000 people, fulfilled more than 880 dreams, and issued over 1,600 tickets, totaling more than 1.2 million kilometers traveled. The project has been recognized by the NGO Make-a-Wish Brazil as a "Wish Maker" partner.
