= Dilara Fındıkoğlu =

Turkish-British fashion designer (born 1990)

- Born: 5 September 1990 (age 35); Istanbul, Turkey
- Education: Central Saint Martins
- Occupation: Fashion designer
- Years active: 2015–present
- Label: Dilara Findikoglu
- Website: shop.dilarafindikoglu.com

Dilara Fındıkoğlu (born September 5, 1990), commonly anglicised as Dilara Findikoglu (Note: /dɪˈlɑːrʌ fəndək.oʊlʊ/), is a Turkish fashion designer.

== Early life and education ==
Fındıkoğlu was born and raised in a conservative Muslim household in Istanbul, Turkey. Her parents are originally from the central Anatolian city of Kayseri, and her father, a businessman, runs an optical factory with her older siblings.

She has recalled growing up as the only daughter in the family and pushing against traditional expectations while discovering heavy metal, tattoos and underground subcultures during her teenage years. As a child she drew female figures and became increasingly interested in fashion and costume, studying spirituality, mythology and alternative worlds alongside fashion imagery.

At the age of 19, Fındıkoğlu moved alone to London to study fashion design at Central Saint Martins. She graduated with honours in 2015.

After her graduate collection was not selected for the school's official press show, Fındıkoğlu organised Encore CSM, a guerrilla presentation held outside the venue for fellow students whose work had also been rejected.

== Career ==
=== Early work and brand launch ===
During her studies at Central Saint Martins, Fındıkoğlu worked with or interned for designers including Mary Katrantzou, Jeremy Scott and Yazbukey, and held an internship at Maison Margiela under John Galliano, whom she has described as a mentor.

In 2016, she founded her eponymous London-based label. One of her early collections, Dante’s Islamic Inferno, was noted for combining Catholic and Islamic references in a critique of discrimination against women in Muslim-majority societies. Her early shows quickly attracted attention for their theatrical staging, maximalist layering and use of non-traditional casting.

Fındıkoğlu’s London Fashion Week debut for spring/summer 2017 was staged in a Soho strip club and combined Tudor sleeves, Victorian corsetry and glam-rock separates with feminist and political references. In February 2017 she presented the collection Seven Sisters of Inherited Sun at London Fashion Week, described in the press as a post-apocalyptic vision mixing religious, punk and mythological iconography.

In 2017, Fındıkoğlu was shortlisted as a semi-finalist for the LVMH Prize for Young Fashion Designers.

=== Notable collections and shows ===
For spring/summer 2023, Fındıkoğlu presented the collection Freedom Is a Two Edged Sword in a decaying Victorian mansion in west London. The show, staged in silence, was structured as four phases – “trapped child”, “chained good girl”, a symbolic funeral of her past and “rebirth” – and drew on her own memories of feeling trapped in her youth.

Her autumn/winter 2023–24 collection, titled Not a Man’s Territory, explored themes of bodily autonomy and patriarchal control, referencing contemporary feminist struggles and protests in Iran. The collection included the widely discussed “Joan’s Knives” dress, constructed from around 200 Victorian knives in reference to Joan of Arc’s armour.

In October 2023, Fındıkoğlu hosted a Halloween banquet in London under the theme “Dark Versailles”, with an elaborate dress code that reinterpreted 18th-century court dress through a decadent, gothic lens.

Her autumn/winter 2024 collection Femme Vortex, presented in a disused London church, proposed an alternative world built around “divine feminine” power and a rejection of hetero-patriarchal structures. The show featured casting including actor Hari Nef and was compared in the French press to John Galliano’s work for Maison Margiela in the same season.

In 2023 Fındıkoğlu announced that she would not show at London Fashion Week for spring/summer 2024 because she had been unable to secure sufficient funding, highlighting the financial pressures faced by independent labels.

=== Collaborations and celebrity clients ===
Since launching her label, Fındıkoğlu has dressed a wide range of musicians and actors, including Bella Hadid, Rihanna, Madonna, Lady Gaga, Björk, FKA twigs, Margot Robbie, Cardi B, Doja Cat and Kylie Jenner.

Her designs have appeared on major red carpets and music stages. Margot Robbie wore a red mini dress by Fındıkoğlu to the London premiere of Barbie in 2023, Cardi B wore a long dress made entirely from hair clips at the 2023 MTV Video Music Awards, and Doja Cat wore several custom pieces by the designer at the 2024 Grammy Awards and at the Wireless Festival in London.

In 2024 Fındıkoğlu collaborated with Kylie Jenner’s clothing line Khy on a capsule collection that translated her corsetry, tailoring and gothic motifs into more widely available pieces. Her work has also been stocked by international retailers such as Selfridges and SSENSE.

== Artistry and style ==
Critics have described Fındıkoğlu's work as strongly influenced by mythology, religious and occult symbolism, tattoo culture, social issues, feminism, goth and punk subcultures and rock music. Her collections frequently incorporate traditional Turkish embroidery, carpet motifs and Anatolian craft techniques, combined with Victorian tailoring, lingerie-inspired silhouettes and references to heavy metal and club culture.

Her aesthetic is often described as maximalist and narrative-driven: shows are staged in settings such as strip clubs, decaying mansions and churches, with garments that layer historical references from Tudor and Victorian dress to 1970s glam rock and 1990s clubwear. Casting frequently includes musicians, activists and non-professional models, reflecting her interest in building a “universe” or “Dilaraverse” around the brand.

Fındıkoğlu has cited filmmaker Alejandro Jodorowsky, metaphysical writer René Guénon, Dame Vivienne Westwood and the band Black Sabbath among her influences. She has also emphasised the feminist dimension of her work, describing her clothes as a way to address how women's bodies have been controlled, judged and fetishised in different societies.

== Controversies ==
=== Allegations about treatment of interns and staff ===
In November 2023, an article in the Italian fashion magazine nss discussed a TikTok video posted by London-based designer Karina Bond, who described what she said was an unpaid internship at a "well-known brand" where she claimed she was asked to sew dozens of garment labels, work until 3 a.m. and was discouraged from taking a break to eat. According to the article, after viewers speculated about which label she was referring to, Bond stated in the comment section that the brand was Fındıkoğlu's eponymous label; she also mentioned having heard other rumours about harsh treatment of interns at the company. The piece presented Bond’s account in the wider context of discussions about burnout and working culture in the fashion industry, and it did not report any legal proceedings related to her allegations. In September 2025 several Turkish media outlets reported further allegations about working conditions at Fındıkoğlu's studio, based on comments left under a TikTok video by a person identifying herself as a former employee. According to these reports, the commenter claimed that staff were expected to work very long days with limited breaks and that some employees had been mocked about their appearance. The same coverage noted that Fındıkoğlu had not issued any public response to these specific claims and that the allegations could not be independently verified.

=== Plagiarism allegations ===
In 2018 Spanish fashion student Saul Lopez publicly alleged that Fındıkoğlu had copied a design from his portfolio, which he said he had submitted when applying for an internship at her label. Lopez posted comparison images of his work and one of Fındıkoğlu's runway looks on social media, and several Turkish outlets reported on the allegation. Fındıkoğlu responded via an Instagram story quoted in Turkish media, arguing that her work should not be seen as plagiarism and that fashion designers often work within overlapping fields of reference and inspiration. Available coverage does not report any legal proceedings or formal findings regarding these plagiarism allegations.
