= Startups.co.uk =

British business advice website

- Company type: Private
- Industry: Entrepreneurship
- Founded: 2000; 26 years ago
- Founder: David Lester
- Headquarters: London, United Kingdom
- Website: startups.co.uk

Startups.co.uk is a UK business advice website, estimated at having 4.8 million readers. It was launched in 2000 by David Lester, who formerly founded the video game development company Impressions Games (responsible for the game Caesar) before selling it to Sierra Entertainment.

== History ==
Startups.co.uk was founded in 2000 to provide advice for nascent entrepreneurs wanting to start a business and to help aspiring entrepreneurs to 'avoid the mistakes he made'.

In 2017, City AM recorded that the small business website had been bought for nearly £1m by MVF, a customer generation and online acquisition specialist that in 2013 had topped the Sunday Times Tech Track.

== Campaigns ==
As an online business resource, the company has been noted for publishing an annual report of ‘best business’ ideas since at least 2014. TRT World featured its editorial director speaking on start-up trends in a roundtable in 2019.

Startups.co.uk also (since 2008) publishes an annual list called Startups 100 ranking the UK's 'hottest startups', taking into account factors such as growth potential as well as product ingenuity.

== Recognition ==
In 2017, Startups.co.uk won a bronze award for its ‘Startups pop-up shop’ at the British Media Awards, powered by Campaign.
