= List of Madonna concerts =

Madonna concerts
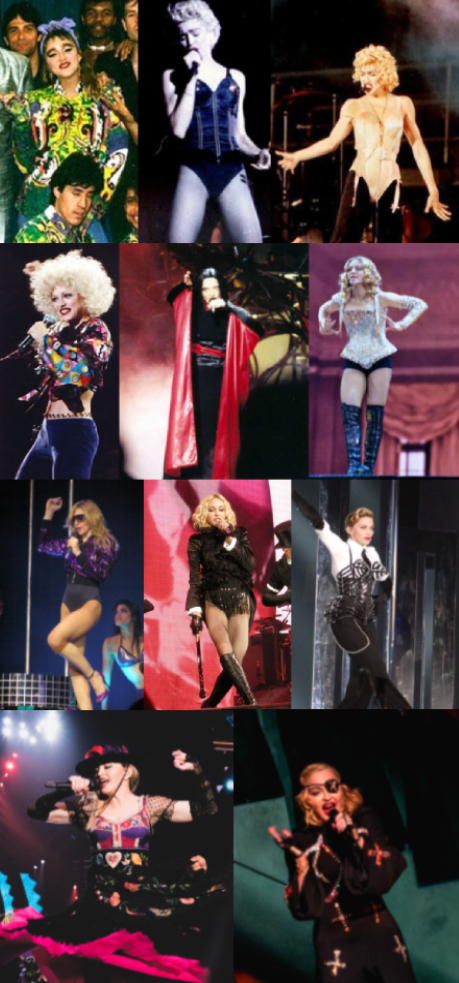
- Collage depicting Madonna's eleven concert tours, beginning with 1985's the Virgin Tour and ending with the Madame X Tour (2019–2020)
- Concert tours: 12
- One-off concerts: 20
- Benefit concerts: 9
- Music festivals: 9
- Sport events: 2

American singer Madonna has performed on twelve concert tours, twenty one-off concerts, nine benefit concerts, three music festivals, and two sport events. Madonna has been nicknamed by some publications as the "Queen of Concerts" or "Queen of Touring", recognizing her "years-deep involvement in the touring game" and stage shows. Previously breaking records for the highest-grossing female touring artist according to Billboard Boxscore and Pollstar, Madonna currently remains in the top ten of the highest-grossing live touring acts of all time. According to Billboard Boxscore, Madonna grossed over $1.5 billion over a dozen global tours.

Her 1985 debut concert tour, the Virgin Tour, was held in North America only and went on to collect more than US$5 million. In 1987 she performed on the worldwide Who's That Girl World Tour, which visited Europe, North America and Japan, and earned $25 million. The Paris stop received an audience of 130,000 fans which was the largest paying concert audience by a female artist at the time and is still the largest crowd of any concert in French history. In 1990, she embarked on the Blond Ambition World Tour, which was dubbed the "Greatest Concert of the 1990s" by Rolling Stone. BBC credited the tour with "invent[ing] the modern, multi-media pop spectacle". A review in Time by Sam Buckley said: "Madonna, once the Harlow harlot and now a perky harlequin, is the greatest show-off on earth."

Madonna did not tour again until the Drowned World Tour in 2001. She played the guitar and her costumes included a punkish tartan kilt and a geisha kimono. Critical response was favorable but the setlist received mixed reviews. She grossed more than US$75 million with summer sold-out shows and eventually played in front of 730,000 people throughout North America and Europe. She followed this up with the 2004 Re-Invention World Tour. Madonna was inspired to create the tour after taking part in an art installation called X-STaTIC PRo=CeSS, directed by photographer Steven Klein. Billboard awarded Madonna the "Backstage Pass Award" in recognition of having the top-grossing tour of the year, with ticket sales of nearly US$125 million.

Madonna's next tours broke world records, with the 2006 Confessions Tour grossing over US$194.7 million, becoming the highest-grossing tour ever for a female artist at that time. She also became the first performer to be inducted into the Wembley Arena Square of Fame in 2006. This feat was surpassed in 2008 with the Sticky & Sweet Tour, which at the time, became the highest-grossing tour ever by a solo artist, and the second highest-grossing tour of all time, with approximately US$411 million in ticket sales. In 2012, the MDNA Tour was completed as the tenth highest-grossing tour of all time with US$305 million, the second highest among female artists at the time, only behind the Sticky & Sweet Tour. Her 2015–16 Rebel Heart Tour was an all-arena tour which grossed $169.8 million from 1.045 million attendance. Her Madame X Tour marked her first series of concerts in theaters since 1985,

The Celebration Tour, which acted as Madonna's first retrospective show, became one of the world's fastest-selling concert tours. Billboard reported the tour to have grossed over $225.4 million from an audience of 1.1 million. The final concert, a free concert in Rio de Janeiro, drew a crowd of over 1.6 million people, which became Madonna's largest crowd of her career and set records for the largest audience ever for a stand-alone concert and the largest all-time crowd for a female artist. Madonna has embarked on several promotional concerts to promote her studio albums, as well as performing award shows and benefit concerts like Live Aid (1985), Live 8 (2005) and Live Earth (2007). In 2012, she headlined the Super Bowl XLVI halftime show, which at that time was the most-watched halftime show in history. She also co-headlined the 2026 FIFA World Cup final halftime show, becoming the first ever artist to perform and open the show.

== Concert tours ==
Title	Date	Associated album(s)	Shows	Gross	Gross adj. in 2026	Attendance	Ref.
The Virgin Tour	April 10, 1985 – June 11, 1985	Madonna; Like a Virgin	40	$5,000,000	$14,967,512	400,000 (Note: Estimated attendees)	
Who's That Girl World Tour	June 14, 1987 – September 6, 1987	True Blue; Who's That Girl	38	$25,000,000	$70,847,979	1,317,663	
Blond Ambition World Tour	April 13, 1990 – August 5, 1990	Like a Prayer; I'm Breathless	57	$62,700,000	$154,514,137	2,000,000	
The Girlie Show	September 25, 1993 – December 19, 1993	Erotica	39	$70,000,000	$156,012,440	1,279,123	
Drowned World Tour	June 9, 2001 – September 15, 2001	Ray of Light; Music	47	$75,000,000	$136,370,043	732,606	
Re-Invention World Tour	May 24, 2004 – September 14, 2004	American Life	56	$124,790,787	$212,711,569	897,207	
Confessions Tour	May 21, 2006 – September 21, 2006	Confessions on a Dance Floor	60	$194,754,447	$311,034,875	1,209,593	
Sticky & Sweet Tour	August 23, 2008 – September 2, 2009	Hard Candy	85	$411,000,000	$616,786,878	3,545,899	
The MDNA Tour	May 31, 2012 – December 22, 2012	MDNA	88	$305,158,362	$427,947,116	2,212,345	
Rebel Heart Tour	September 9, 2015 – March 20, 2016	Rebel Heart	82	$169,804,336	$227,794,918	1,045,479	
Madame X Tour	September 17, 2019 – March 8, 2020	Madame X	75	$51,361,008	$63,895,815	179,289	
The Celebration Tour	October 14, 2023 – May 4, 2024	Various	81	$227,200,000	$233,177,045	2,727,658 (Note: Estimated assistance by Riotur. According to El País, other media outlets estimated an attendance of 2.5 million people.)	
Total			748	$1,721,768,940	$2,626,060,327	17,546,862	—N/a

== One-off concerts ==
Date	Event	City	Venue	Performed song(s)	Ref.
October 13, 1983	Madonna promotional show	London	Camden Palace	"Everybody"; "Burning Up"; "Holiday"	
February 14, 1998	Ray of Light promotional show	New York City	Roxy NYC	"Sky Fits Heaven"; "Shanti/Ashtangi"; "Ray of Light"	
November 5, 2000	Music promotional show	New York City	Roseland Ballroom	"Impressive Instant"; "Runaway Lover"; "Don't Tell Me"; "What It Feels Like for a Girl"; "Music"	
November 29, 2000	Music promotional show	London	Brixton Academy	"Impressive Instant"; "Runaway Lover"; "Don't Tell Me"; "What It Feels Like for a Girl"; "Holiday"; "Music"	
April 22, 2003	Madonna: On Stage and on the Record	New York City	MTV Studios	"American Life"; "Hollywood"; "Nothing Fails"; "X-Static Process"; "Like a Prayer"	
April 23, 2003	American Life promotional show	New York City	Tower Records	"American Life"; "X-Static Process"; "Mother and Father"; "Hollywood"; "Like a Virgin"; "American Life"	
April 30, 2003	Absolut Madonna	Cologne	RTL Studio	"American Life"; "Hollywood"; "Music"	
May 9, 2003	American Life promotional show	London	HMV Oxford Circus	"American Life"; "Hollywood"; "Nothing Fails"; "X-Static Process"; "Mother and Father"; "Like a Prayer"; "Don't Tell Me"	
November 15, 2005	Confessions on a Dance Floor promotional show	London	KOKO	"Hung Up"; "Get Together"; "I Love New York"; "Let It Will Be"; "Everybody"	
November 19, 2005	Confessions on a Dance Floor promotional show	London	G-A-Y	"Hung Up"; "Get Together"; "I Love New York"; "Let It Will Be"; "Everybody"; "Jump"	
December 7, 2005	Confessions on a Dance Floor promotional show	Tokyo	Studio Coast	"Hung Up"; "Get Together"; "I Love New York"; "Let It Will Be"; "Everybody"	
April 30, 2008	Hard Candy promotional show	New York City	Roseland Ballroom	"Candy Shop"; "Miles Away"; "4 Minutes" (with Justin Timberlake); "Hung Up"; "Give It 2 Me"; "Music"	
May 6, 2008	Hard Candy promotional show	Paris	Olympia	"Candy Shop"; "Miles Away"; "4 Minutes"; "Hung Up"; "Give It 2 Me"; "Music"	
March 10, 2016	Madonna: Tears of a Clown	Melbourne	Forum Theatre	"Send In the Clowns"; "Drowned World/Substitute for Love"; " X-Static Process"; "Between the Bars"; "Nobody's Perfect"; "Easy Ride"; "Intervention"; "I'm So Stupid"; "Paradise (Not for Me)"; "Joan of Arc"; "Don't Tell Me"; "Mer Girl"; "Borderline"; "Take a Bow"; "Holiday"	
November 7, 2016	Hillary Clinton campaign concert	New York City	Washington Square Park	"Express Yourself"; "Don't Tell Me"; "Imagine"; "Like a Prayer"; "If I Had a Hammer"; "Rebel Heart"	
May 7, 2018	Met Gala	New York City	Metropolitan Museum of Art	"Like a Prayer"; "Dark Ballet"; "Hallelujah"	
June 30, 2019	Stonewall 50 – WorldPride NYC	New York City	Pier 97, Hudson River Park	"Vogue"; "American Life"; "God Control"; "I Rise"	
April 30, 2022	Medallo en el Mapa (Maluma hometown concert)	Medellín	Estadio Atanasio Girardot	"Medellín" (with Maluma); "Music"	
June 24, 2022	NYC Pride March	New York City	Terminal 5	"Hung Up"; "Material Gworrllllllll!"; "Celebration"	
June 4, 2026	Grindr Pride Month Party	New York City	The Square in Times Square	"I Feel So Free"; "Bring Your Love"; "Love Sensation"; "Get Together"; "I Love New York"; "Hung Up"	

== Benefit concerts ==
Date	Event	City	Performed song(s)	Ref.
July 13, 1985	Live Aid	Philadelphia	"Holiday"; "Into the Groove"; "Love Makes the World Go Round"; "Revolution" (with Thompson Twins, Steve Stevens and Nile Rodgers)	
April 27, 1998	Rock for the Rainforest	New York City	"Frozen" (solo); "With a Little Help from My Friends" (with all stars); "Twist and Shout" (with all stars)	
January 16, 2005	Tsunami Aid	New York City	"Imagine"	
July 2, 2005	Live 8	London	"Like a Prayer"; "Ray of Light"; "Music"	
November 18, 2005	Children in Need 2005	London	"Hung Up"; "Get Together"	
July 7, 2007	Live Earth	London	"Hey You"; "Ray of Light"; "La Isla Bonita" (with Gogol Bordello); "Hung Up"	
January 22, 2010	Hope for Haiti Now	New York City	"Like a Prayer"	
December 2, 2016	Madonna: Tears of a Clown (Raising Malawi Gala)	Miami	"Send In the Clowns"; "Like It or Not"; "Toxic"; "I'm So Stupid"; "Beautiful Stranger"; "Easy Ride"; "American Life"; "Don't Tell Me"; "Express Yourself"; "Holiday"	
July 26, 2017	Leonardo DiCaprio Foundation Gala	Saint-Tropez	"4 Minutes"; "Ray of Light"; "Ghosttown"; "Open Your Heart"; "La Isla Bonita"	

== Music festivals ==
Date	Event	City	Performed song(s)	Ref.
February 22, 1995	Sanremo Music Festival	Sanremo	"Take a Bow" (with Babyface)	
February 24, 1998	Sanremo Music Festival	Sanremo	"Frozen"	
April 30, 2006	Coachella	Indio	"Hung Up"; "Get Together"; "I Love New York"; "Ray of Light"; "Let It Will Be"; "Everybody"	
May 10, 2008	BBC Radio 1's Big Weekend	Maidstone	"Candy Shop"; "Miles Away"; "4 Minutes"; "Hung Up"; "Give It 2 Me"; "Music"	
March 25, 2012	Ultra Music Festival	Miami	"Girl Gone Wild" (as a guest during Avicii's act)	
April 12, 2015	Coachella	Indio	"Human Nature"; "Hung Up" (as a guest during Drake's act)	
May 18, 2019	Eurovision Song Contest	Tel Aviv	"Like a Prayer"; "Dark Ballet"; "Future" (with Quavo)	
April 17, 2026	Coachella	Indio	"Vogue"; "Bring Your Love"; "Get Together" (snippet acapella); "Like a Prayer" (as a guest during Sabrina Carpenter's act)	
April 10, 2027	Coachella	Indio	TBA	
April 17, 2027	Coachella	Indio	TBA	

== Sport events ==
Date	Event	City	Venue	Performed song(s)	Ref.
February 5, 2012	Super Bowl XLVI halftime show	Indianapolis	Lucas Oil Stadium	"Vogue"; "Music" (with LMFAO, contains elements of "Party Rock Anthem" and "Sexy and I Know It"); "Give Me All Your Luvin'" (with Nicki Minaj and M.I.A.); "Open Your Heart" / "Express Yourself" (with CeeLo Green); "Like a Prayer" (with CeeLo Green)	
July 19, 2026	2026 FIFA World Cup final halftime show	East Rutherford	MetLife Stadium	"Music" (contains elements of "Disco Inferno" and "Danceteria")	

== See also ==
- List of performances on Top of the Pops
- List of most-watched television broadcasts
- List of most-attended concert tours
- List of most-attended concerts
- List of highest-grossing live music artists
- List of highest-grossing concert tours
- List of highest-grossing concert tours by women
