= Re-Invention World Tour =

2004 concert tour by Madonna

- Tour by Madonna
- Promotional poster for the tour
- Location: Europe; North America
- Associated album: American Life
- Start date: May 24, 2004
- End date: September 14, 2004
- Legs: 2
- No. of shows: 56
- Attendance: 897,207
- Box office: US$125 million (Note: US$213.07 million in 2025 dollars.)

Madonna concert chronology
- Drowned World Tour (2001); Re-Invention World Tour (2004); Confessions Tour (2006)

The Re-Invention World Tour (billed as Re-Invention World Tour 2004) was the sixth concert tour by American singer Madonna, launched in support of her ninth studio album, American Life (2003). It began on May 24, 2004, at the Forum in Inglewood, California, and concluded on September 14 at the Pavilhão Atlântico in Lisbon, Portugal. The tour marked Madonna's return to the stage after three years and included her first-ever concerts in both Portugal and Ireland. Initially rumored in late 2003 and officially announced in March 2004, the tour's title referenced the singer's reputation for reinvention, as well as her aim to rework and reimagine older songs. The 24-track set list was divided into five thematic acts —Marie Antoinette, Military, Circus, Acoustic, and Scottish-Tribal— with costumes designed by Arianne Phillips, Stella McCartney, Christian Lacroix, and Karl Lagerfeld.

Critical reception ranged from positive to mixed. While many reviewers praised Madonna for performing the "classic" songs absent from her previous Drowned World Tour (2001), others critiqued the concert's themes and political elements. Nevertheless, the tour was a commercial triumph, grossing over $125 million ($213.07 million in 2025 dollars) from 56 sold-out shows and drawing an audience of more than 900,000, making it the highest-grossing tour of 2004. It won Top Tour at the 2004 Billboard Touring Awards. Controversy briefly surrounded the tour when Elton John accused Madonna of lip syncing —a claim denied by her team and later retracted by John. The tour was later chronicled in the 2005 documentary I'm Going to Tell You a Secret, directed by Jonas Åkerlund.

== Background ==
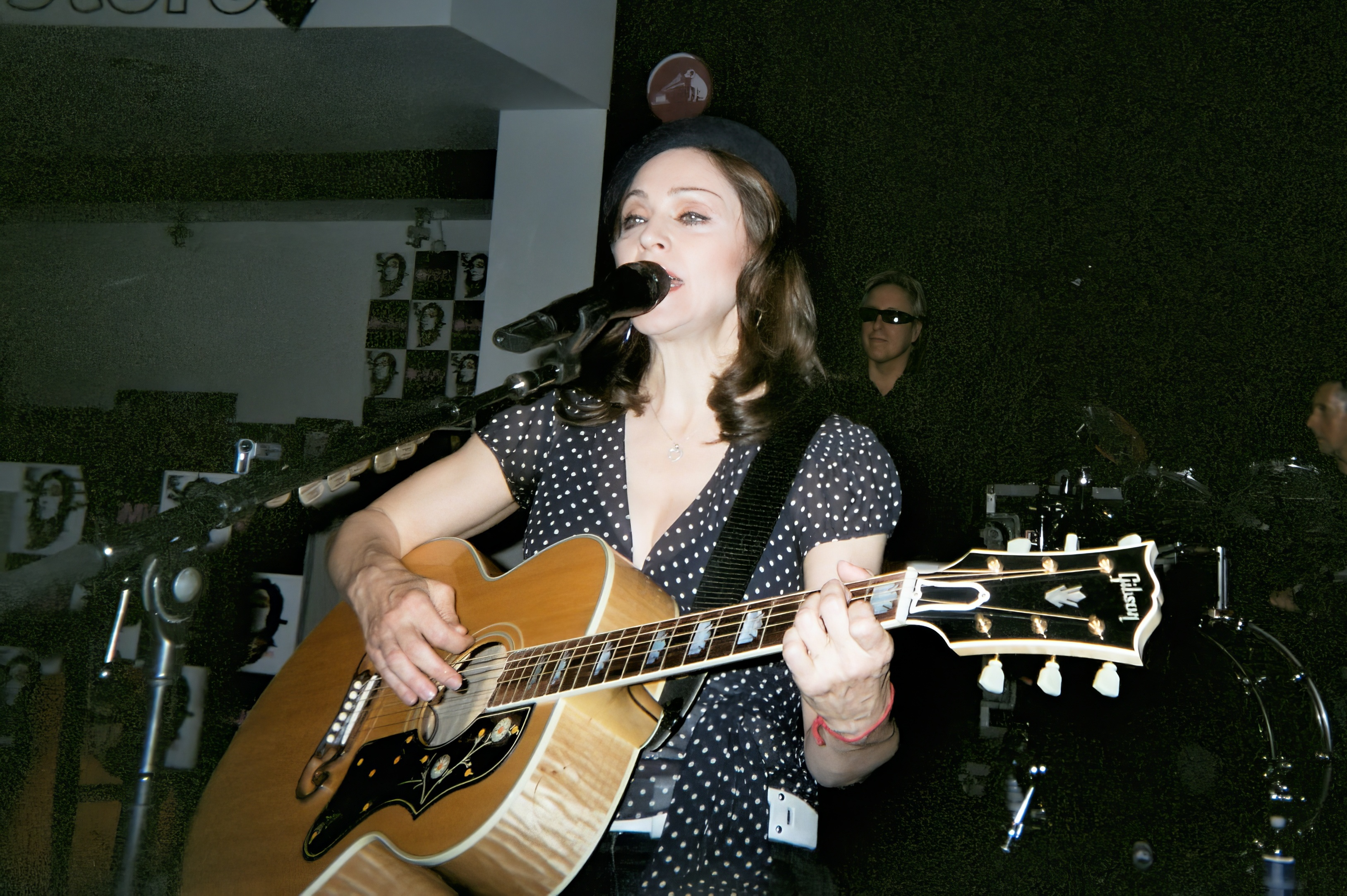
Madonna performing at London's HMV store in May 2003 as part of the promotional campaign for American Life.

In August 2002, Madonna collaborated with photographer Steven Klein on X-STaTIC PRO=CeSS, a multimedia art installation designed to explore and deconstruct her public image. Featuring "stark" visuals and disorienting footage that portrayed her in surreal, regal settings, the project debuted in New York in March 2003 and traveled to several European cities. Around this time, she released her ninth studio album, American Life, and promoted it with performances at MTV's Total Request Live, the HMV store on Oxford Street, and appearances on Top of the Pops and Friday Night with Jonathan Ross. She also made headlines with a performance alongside Britney Spears and Christina Aguilera at the 2003 MTV Video Music Awards.

Talk of a concert tour began circulating in late 2003, with Madonna's manager confirming plans for either late 2004 or early 2005. By January, Madonna herself said she had show ideas in mind, and rehearsals were reported to be underway by March. Early working titles included Whore of Babylon World Tour 2004, and Scottish bagpiper Calum Frase revealed he had been invited to participate. On March 23, 2004, the Re-Invention World Tour was officially announced. Manager Caresse Henry said it would be a high point in Madonna's career, and a welcome return that would remind audiences of her strength as a live performer. Drawing partial inspiration from X-STaTIC PRO=CeSS, the tour marked her first in three years and included her debut in Ireland. Scheduled shows in Tel Aviv were canceled due to security concerns, though Madonna expressed disappointment, saying she would have gone if it were up to her. The tour opened on May 24 in Inglewood, California, and concluded on September 14 in Lisbon, Portugal.

== Development ==
=== Conception and set list ===
One of the main criticisms of 2001's Drowned World Tour was the omission of Madonna's "classic hits". According to Henry, this feedback led the singer to rethink her approach for Re-Invention, opting to perform songs spanning her entire career. As she explained on Total Request Live, "We're talking old and new […] like they've never been done before." The tour title, Re-Invention, was described by Christianity Magazine as a self-aware nod to critics who had long commented on her ever-changing image. Madonna herself said the name reflected the need to approach her older material from a new angle, highlighting its irony. Thematically lighter than Drowned World, Re-Invention centered on the contrast between unity and violence and was divided into five thematic acts acts: Marie Antoinette, Military, Circus, Acoustic, and Scottish-Tribal. Henry called it a "brilliant performance show—extravagant, but more in line with how shows used to be."

The set list was carefully refined during rehearsals, beginning with over thirty potential songs. Tracks like "Dress You Up" (1985) and "I'm So Stupid" were considered but ultimately dropped —some due to technical challenges, like learning guitar chords. "Vogue" (1990) was initially intended as the opener before being replaced by "The Beast Within". Other rehearsed songs that didn’t make the cut included the Headcleanr Mix of "Love Profusion" (2004), "Swim" from Ray of Light (1998), "Take a Bow" (1994), and "Live to Tell" (1986). The final set list featured twenty-four tracks, including a cover of John Lennon's "Imagine" (1971), which Madonna called "the ultimate peace song". "Don't Tell Me" (2001) was performed in two variations —one with a French skyline backdrop, another sampling The Verve's "Bitter Sweet Symphony" (1997). "Ray of Light" was removed due to vocal strain. Two new songs were also created during the process: "The Devil Wouldn’t Recognize You" and "I Love New York", both later reworked into future studio albums.

=== Rehearsals and stage setup ===
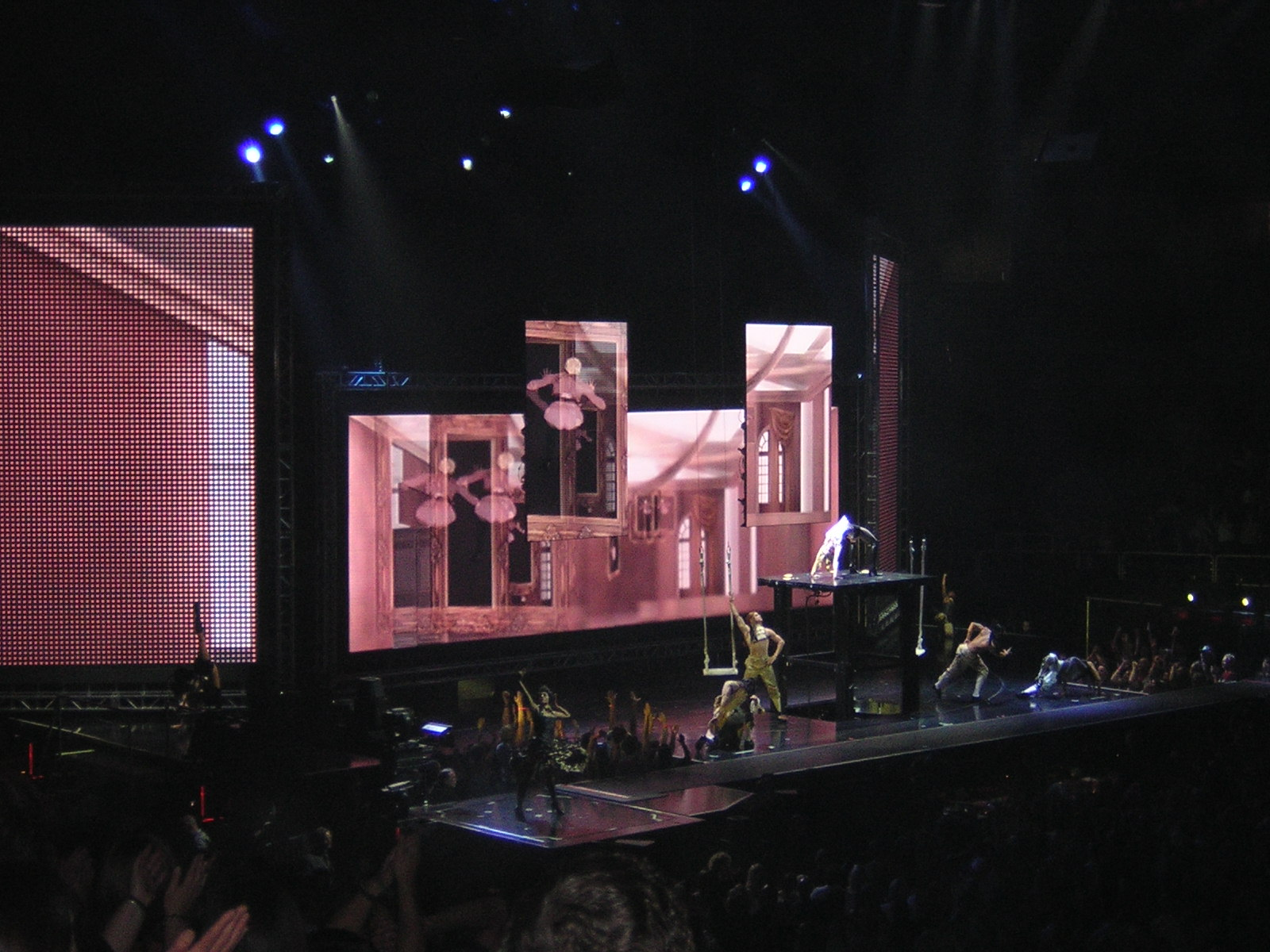
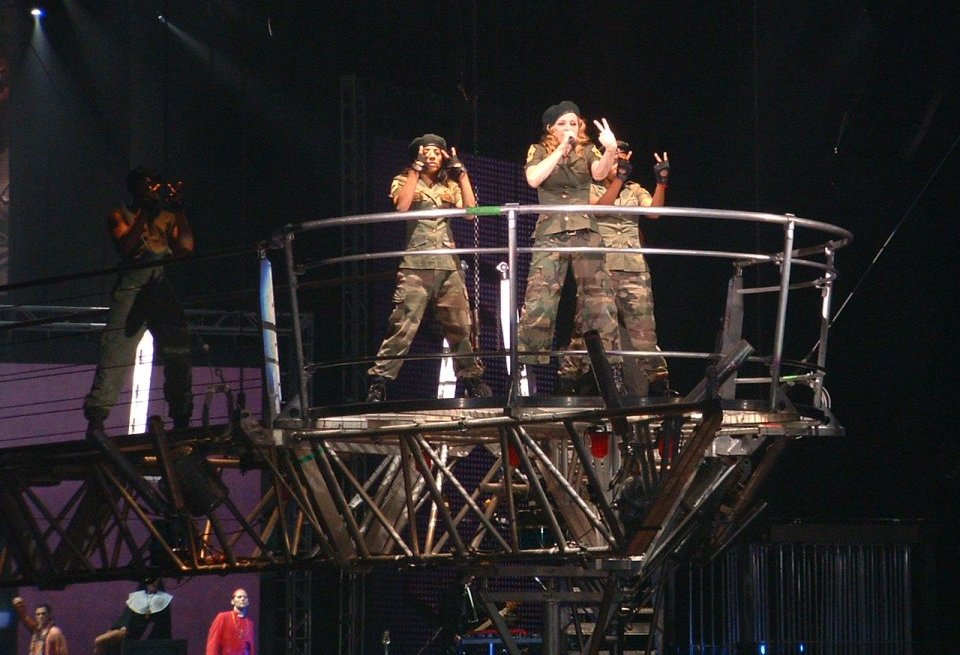
Faraway view of the stage, depicting the screens that were used as backdrops (top), and the V-shaped catwalk used by the singer to walk above the audience in performances such as "American Life" (bottom).

Jamie King returned as creative director for tour, continuing his long-standing collaboration with Madonna. The production team also included guitarist Monte Pittman, keyboardist and musical director Stuart Price, bagpiper Lorne Cousin, backing vocalist Siedah Garrett, and longtime backing vocalist and dancer Donna De Lory. A troupe of 12 dancers —three of them trapeze artists— rounded out the ensemble. Dancer auditions were held in New York and Los Angeles between February and March 2004, with rehearsals taking place at the Forum. Choreographer Allan Dekko was brought in specifically for "Express Yourself" (1989), which featured a military theme; he later described Madonna as pleasant to work with and capable of meeting the show’s physical demands.

The production, estimated at $1 million, featured an ambitious stage design. It included a 13 m (43 ft) rotating turntable that could rise nearly 3 m (9.8 ft) and spin at speeds up to 6.7 m/s (15 mph), along with a conveyor belt that ran along the front edge of the stage. Five massive video screens—one weighing seven tons—formed the multimedia backdrop, moved by 160 individual motors. Additional elements included 130 rigging points, an elaborate lighting system, and a four-ton Claire Brothers line array sound system. A 22 metres (72 ft) V-shaped catwalk was suspended from the ceiling, descending over the crowd during certain numbers. The show also used striking visual props such as a skateboarding half-pipe and an electric chair, with footage from the X-STaTIC PRO=CeSS installation featured throughout. Notably, there was no opening act.

=== Fashion ===
The wardrobe for the Re-Invention tour was overseen by designer Arianne Phillips, who stated that the costume design followed the same approach as the tour itself —reworking past material with new presentation. Madonna underwent five costume changes during the concert, with contributions from designers Stella McCartney, Christian Lacroix, and Karl Lagerfeld for Chanel. Each act featured a distinct visual style. Lacroix, who had previously collaborated with the singer on X-STaTIC PRO=CeSS, recreated one of the corsets from that project for the tour's opening: a champagne-colored, crystal-studded piece with Baroque inspiration. The second segment, tied to the American Life album, included military-inspired outfits described by Phillips as "real rock 'n' roll". The third act, influenced by the work of Federico Fellini and traditional circus aesthetics, featured bold chorus girl corsets by Lagerfeld. For the more subdued fourth act, McCartney designed minimal garments that emphasized performer silhouettes. The final segment incorporated kilts from USA Kilts, blending traditional Scottish elements with contemporary streetwear touches. Additional wardrobe pieces included T-shirts by Jean Paul Gaultier and shoes by Miu Miu. The official tour poster featured an image from X-STaTIC PRO=CeSS, showing Madonna in a 17th-century-style dress, crawling toward the camera.

== Concert synopsis ==
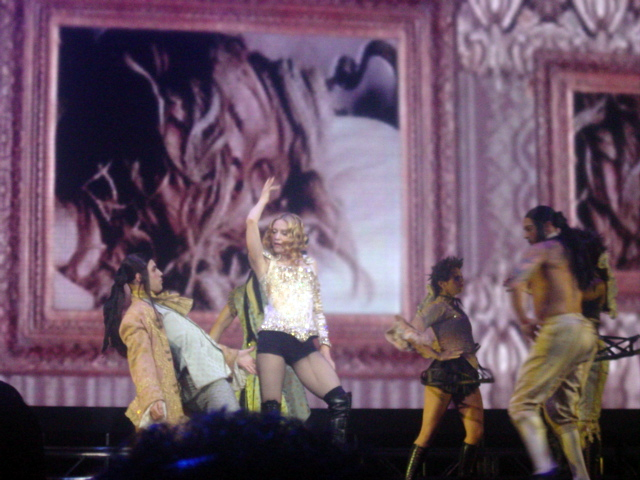
Madonna and her dancers opening the concert with a performance of "Vogue".

The show opened with "The Beast Within", a spoken-word interpretation of the Book of Revelation accompanied by imagery from X-STaTIC PRO=CeSS. As the visuals ended, Madonna emerged from below the stage in the Lacroix corset and performed "Vogue" with yoga-inspired poses. She followed with "Nobody Knows Me" dancing solo on the conveyor belt while lyrics flashed onscreen. The act closed with "Frozen", sung amid clouds of dry ice and beneath video projections from Chris Cunningham, showing a naked androgynous couple wrestling underwater.

The Military segment opened with the sound of helicopters and dancers dressed as soldiers crawling and embracing onstage. Madonna then appeared atop a stack of TV sets, wearing military fatigues and a beret, to perform "American Life". The backdrops showed the song's original music video, intercut with imagery of war, wounded children, and actors resembling George W. Bush and Saddam Hussein. Midway through the performance, the V-shaped catwalk descended from the ceiling, allowing the singer and dancers to move above the audience. "Express Yourself" featured rifle twirling, while rock-infused versions of "Burning Up" and "Material Girl" closed the act, and had Madonna on electric guitar.

The Circus act followed, introduced by a remix interlude of "Hollywood" showcasing a firedancer, a belly dancer, a tap dancer, a skateboarder, and Rider–Waite tarot animations. "Hanky Panky" was staged like a burlesque show, while "Deeper and Deeper" was reimagined as a slow lounge number. "Die Another Day" was choreographed as a tango and ended with Madonna being strapped into an electric chair, leading into the ballad "Lament" from Evita. The act concluded with a video interlude set to a remix of "Bedtime Story", featuring imagery of Madonna lying on a giant scanner and singing in front of a mirror. As the video played, aerial dancers descended from the ceiling on swings.

"Nothing Fails" opened the Acoustic segment, performed by Madonna on acoustic guitar. "Don't Tell Me", "Like a Prayer" and a mashup of American Life album tracks "Mother and Father" and "Intervention" followed; the latter performance incorporated religious imagery and footage of the singer's late mother. "Imagine", with Madonna singing amid visuals of war-torn areas and children, closed the act. The final Scottish-Tribal segment opened with live bagpipers and "Into the Groove", performed with Missy Elliott appearing onscreen. Madonna wore a kilt and rotated between T-shirts bearing phrases like "Kabbalists Do It Better" or "Italians Do It Better". She followed with "Papa Don't Preach" and "Crazy for You", which she dedicated to her fans. "Music" featured a hip-hop remix and illuminated staircase, while the finale, "Holiday", featured the cast atop the catwalk as confetti rained down and the words "Re-invent Yourself" appeared onscreen.

== Critical reception ==
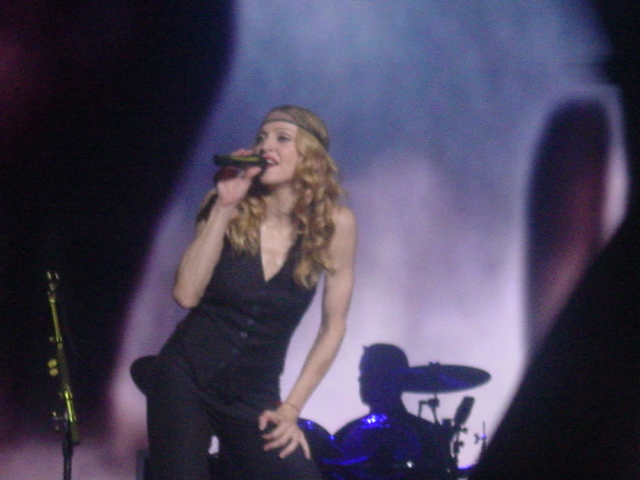
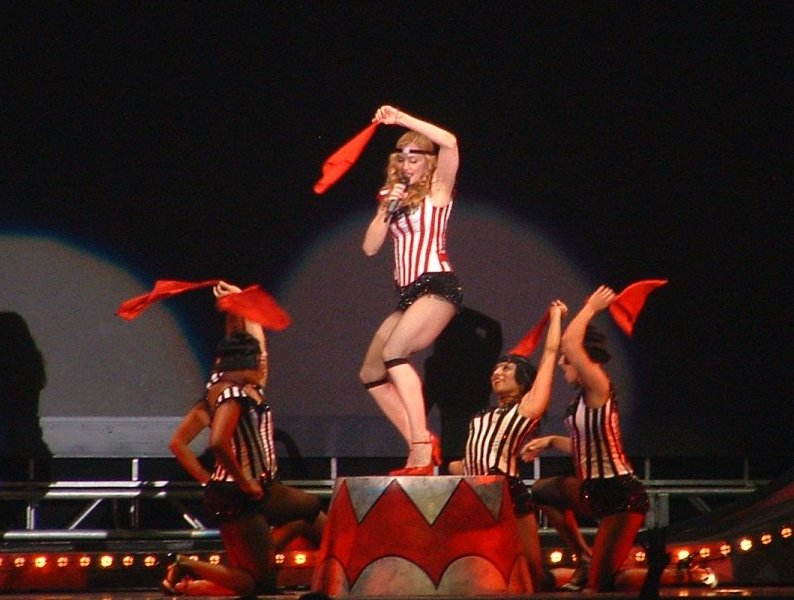
Most reviewers singled out the performance of Madonna's "classic" songs like "Like a Prayer" (top). By contrast, the inclusion of "unappealing" tracks like "Hanky Panky" (bottom) was met with criticism.

Critical feedback towards Re-Invention ranged from positive to mixed. Many highlighted Madonna's renewed connection with her audience and her willingness to revisit earlier hits. Elizabeth Smith from the New York Post called the show a "return to light and joy", while USA Today's Edna Gundersen praised its emotional depth, giving it a perfect score and describing it as "more heart than spectacle". Mark Guarino of the Daily Herald referred to the show as a "joyful blend" of past and present. Critics also praised Madonna's vocal performance and stage presence. Rolling Stone's Barry Walters wrote that she was "fun-loving and self-assured", and called her "a great concert singer". The choreography and theatricality were positively received, with Sean Piccoli of the Sun Sentinel complimenting the show's "energizing choreography" and "commanding vocals".

The set list was frequently cited as a highlight, particularly the inclusion of Madonna's "classic" songs. Sal Cinquemani of Slant Magazine referred to them as "unifying, cathartic moments", while The Washington Post noted that Madonna had finally "embraced her pop legacy". Howard Cohen, writing for the Miami Herald, said the tour celebrated her legacy by breathing new life into her greatest hits. Others, like The Palm Beach Post, praised the mature reinterpretations of her older material, with Rochelle Brenner calling the arrangements "fitting for a more seasoned performer". The San Francisco Chronicle's Neva Chonin spotlighted performances like "Frozen" and "Material Girl" as artistic highlights. For The Star-Ledger, Jay Lustig called it the singer's most "dizzying and dazzling" tour, and Joan Anderman of the Boston Globe applauded Madonna's command over both spectacle and music.

Some reviewers offered more mixed assessments. Jane Stevenson of the Toronto Sun considered the Circus segment the weakest part of the show, though she praised the inventiveness of "Die Another Day". Tony Clayton-Lea from The Irish Times questioned the inclusion of "least appealing" songs like "Die Another Day" and "Hanky Panky", and concluded that while Madonna didn't exactly "rock", she reaffirmed her pop dominance. Paul Taylor of the Manchester Evening News described the show as "tremendously well-crafted", though he also found it "calculated and soulless". Cinquemani criticized the tour's overall structure, saying it "often seemed like it was slapped together", while Metromix's Greg Kot called it a "mess, a hodgepodge of ideas that never quite establishes its tenuous theme". Kelefa Sanneh of The New York Times noted that Madonna seemed "weighed down by her past personas".

For RedEye, Joshua Klein found the show an improvement over the "bleak" Drowned World Tour, yet ultimately called it a "missed opportunity". He criticized the inclusion of older hits for creating a "jarring hodgepodge of conflicting themes, with anti-war protest followed awkwardly by giddy escapism". Klein did single out "Burning Up" as a highlight —calling its performance "absolutely searing"— while also noting "Like a Prayer" as one of the only moments that truly energized the crowd. Conversely, he felt Madonna looked "ridiculous" during "Papa Don't Preach" and "Crazy for You", and turned "Material Girl" into a "droll joke". Jim DeRogatis from the Chicago Sun-Times criticized some of the rearranged songs for sounding like "parodies", and found performances such as "Imagine" hollow.

The political elements drew frequent criticism. DeRogatis dismissed Madonna's anti-war statements as simplistic, while Peter Bowes from BBC News reported mixed reactions from audiences, some of whom found the messaging heavy-handed. Cohen said the imagery felt outdated and diluted the intended impact. Cinquemani noted that the political visuals felt unrelated to the actual songs; Paul Taylor similarly criticized the juxtaposition of war imagery with "high-camp showmanship" as "not just empty but distasteful". Robert Hilburn from the Los Angeles Times argued that the commentary lacked the clarity and urgency of other politically engaged artists, and called for the singer to "bring back the sex". The New York Post's Orla Healy dismissed the concert for replacing entertainment and spectale with an "endless dose of political and social commentary". Despite the divided opinions, Re-Invention won Top Tour at the 2004 Billboard Touring Awards, with Henry receiving the Top Manager award. Retrospectively, it has been ranked among her best tours by The Advocate, VH1, and Billboard, the latter describing Madonna as being "in top form both vocally and physically".

== Commercial performance ==
The tour launched to high demand, with tickets initially offered to members of Madonna's Icon fan club, and VIP packages selling for up to $1,800. MTV launched a contest offering fans front-row "pit tickets", which the singer described as a way to connect with her most devoted audience. Within five days, dates in major US cities like New York, Los Angeles, and Chicago sold out; in New York alone, six shows brought in over $12 million. The first ten concerts grossed $23 million, and by the end of the American leg, approximately 750,000 people had attended, with strong grosses in cities like Chicago, Las Vegas, and Worcester. Halfway through, Billboard magazine predicted the tour to be the top-grossing of the year, with a gross of $120 million ($204.55 million in 2025 dollars).

In Europe, despite some reports of slower initial sales, the tour proved commercially successful. Manchester's 14,000 tickets sold out in an hour, while four nights at London's Wembley Arena grossed $9.8 million. High demand in Paris led to additional dates; in Ireland, Ticketmaster doubled its staff and server capacity to handle demand. Lisbon's 15,000 tickets sold out in eight hours. In total, Re-Invention grossed $125 million ($213.07 million in 2025 dollars), becoming 2004's highest-grossing tour. Lucy O'Brien noted that despite its success, the tour "somehow slipped beneath the mass media radar," due in part to inflated ticket prices and the underwhelming reception of American Life.

== Lip sync allegation and incident ==
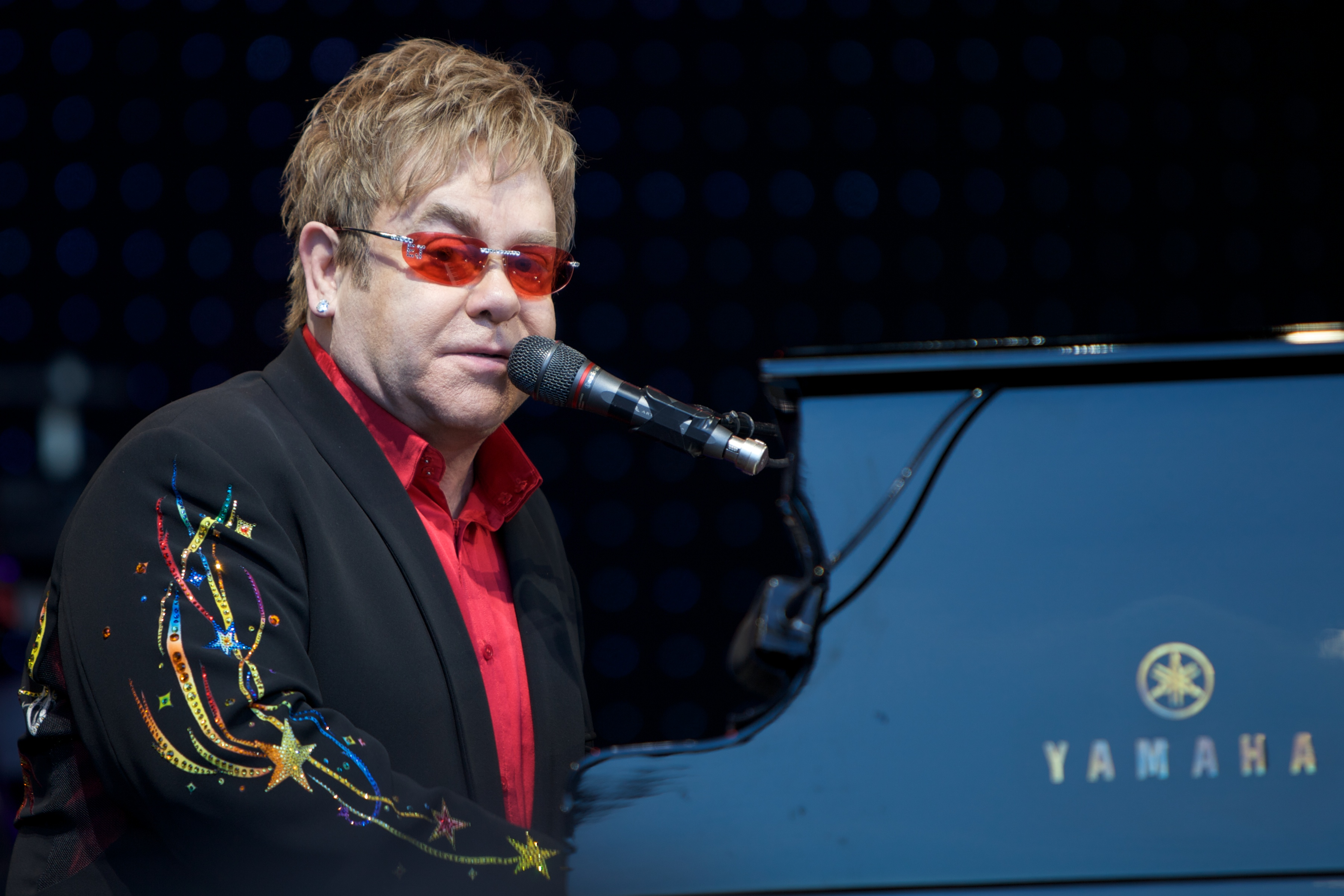
Elton John (picture) accused Madonna of having lip-synced on the tour, but later apologized.

During the Q Awards in London, Elton John publicly criticized Madonna, expressing disbelief at her nomination for Best Live Act. He accused her of having lip synced on the tour, stating, "Anyone who lip-syncs in public on stage when you pay $134 to see them should be shot. That's me off her fucking Christmas card list [...] But do I give a toss? No." Madonna's publicist Liz Rosenberg quickly denied the claim, asserting that Madonna "sang every note of her Re-Invention Tour live" and did not engage in trashing other artists. She added that John, "remains on her Christmas card list whether he is nice... or naughty". Madonna herself reportedly responded by sending him a box of chocolates with a sarcastic note. John later walked back his remarks in an interview with Entertainment Weekly, referring to the Awards show as a "very drunken lunch" and admitting he regretted the outburst. "Would I apologize to [Madonna] if I saw her? Yeah, because I don’t want to hurt any artist's feelings. It was my fault. I instigated the whole thing", he said, though he maintained his criticism of pop performers who lip sync. "The reaction to it was so hysterical, it was like I said, 'I think all gays should be killed’ or 'Hitler was right'. I just said someone was lip-syncing".

Separately, during the London leg of the tour, a crew member was seriously injured after falling approximately 30 feet while setting up the stage. He sustained arm and shoulder injuries and was airlifted to the hospital. Henry issued a statement expressing that the team, "especially Madonna", was saddened by the accident and hopeful for a full recovery.

== Planned television broadcast, and documentary ==
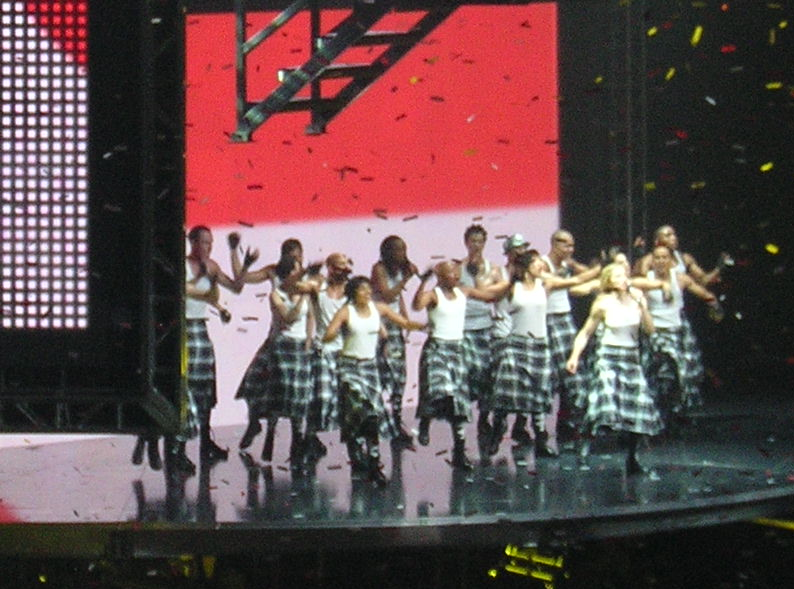
The show's closer, "Holiday", one of the performances included on I'm Going to Tell You a Secret.

On May 25, 2004, CBS announced plans to air a two-hour live special of the tour, reportedly offering $10 million for broadcast rights. However, no air date was ever confirmed. In April 2005, director Hamish Hamilton and The Rude Corp. sued Madonna, claiming over $300,000 in unpaid fees. They alleged a verbal "pay-or-play" agreement to film a European TV special, but said they were never compensated despite attending rehearsals and shows at her request.

The official tour documentary, I'm Going to Tell You a Secret, directed by Jonas Åkerlund —who had previously worked with Madonna on several music videos— focused on her artistic vision and spiritual beliefs, particularly Kabbalah. Originally titled The Re-Invented Process, it offered a more introspective take than 1991's Madonna: Truth or Dare. The film premiered on MTV on October 21, 2005.

Critical reception was mixed. Barry Walters noted its shift toward sincerity over shallow celebrity gossip, while Pitchfork's Stephen M. Deusner criticized its lack of self-awareness. A two-disc release followed on June 20, 2006, featuring the documentary and a 14-track live album and the original rock demo of "I Love New York". It received more favorable reviews. AllMusic called it "strong and entertaining", and it earned a Grammy nomination for Best Long Form Music Video.

== Set list ==
Set list, samples and notes adapted per Madonna's official website, the notes and track listing of I'm Going to Tell You a Secret, and additional sources.

Act 1: Marie Antoinette

1. "The Beast Within" (Video introduction; contains elements of "El Yom 'Ulliqa 'Ala Khashaba")
2. "Vogue"
3. "Nobody Knows Me"
4. "Frozen"

Act 2: Military

5. "American Life"
6. "Express Yourself"
7. "Burning Up"
8. "Material Girl"

Act 3: Circus

9. "Hollywood" (Remix; interlude)
10. "Hanky Panky"
11. "Deeper and Deeper"
12. "Die Another Day"
13. "Lament"
14. "Bedtime Story" (Orbital Remix; interlude)

Act 4: Acoustic

15. "Nothing Fails"
16. "Don't Tell Me" (Contains elements of "Bitter Sweet Symphony")
17. "Like a Prayer"
18. "Mother and Father" (Contains excerpts from "Intervention")
19. "Imagine"

Act 5: Scottish-Tribal

20. "Into the Groove" (Contains elements of "Susan MacLeod" and "Into the Hollywood Groove")
21. "Papa Don't Preach" (Ends with a reprise of "American Life")
22. "Crazy for You"
23. "Music" (Contains reprises from "Into the Groove")
24. "Holiday" (Contains elements of "She Wants to Move" and "Physical Attraction")

== Tour dates ==
List of 2004 concerts
Date (2004)	City	Country	Venue	Attendance (Tickets sold / available)	Revenue
May 24	Inglewood (Note: Labeled as Los Angeles in promotional material.)	United States	The Forum	43,158 / 43,158	$6,965,055
May 26 (Note: This concert was scheduled to take place one day earlier, but was postponed due to illness)	Inglewood	United States	The Forum	43,158 / 43,158	$6,965,055
May 27	Inglewood	United States	The Forum	43,158 / 43,158	$6,965,055
May 29	Las Vegas	United States	MGM Grand Garden Arena	28,341 / 28,341	$7,005,548
May 30	Las Vegas	United States	MGM Grand Garden Arena	28,341 / 28,341	$7,005,548
June 2	Anaheim	United States	Arrowhead Pond of Anaheim	24,250 / 24,250	$4,164,450
June 3	Anaheim	United States	Arrowhead Pond of Anaheim	24,250 / 24,250	$4,164,450
June 6	San Jose	United States	HP Pavilion	40,205 / 40,205	$5,543,715
June 8	San Jose	United States	HP Pavilion	40,205 / 40,205	$5,543,715
June 9	San Jose	United States	HP Pavilion	40,205 / 40,205	$5,543,715
June 13	Washington, D.C.	United States	MCI Center	26,788 / 26,788	$3,486,684
June 14	Washington, D.C.	United States	MCI Center	26,788 / 26,788	$3,486,684
June 16	New York City	United States	Madison Square Garden	88,625 / 88,625	$12,674,925
June 17	New York City	United States	Madison Square Garden	88,625 / 88,625	$12,674,925
June 20	New York City	United States	Madison Square Garden	88,625 / 88,625	$12,674,925
June 21	New York City	United States	Madison Square Garden	88,625 / 88,625	$12,674,925
June 23	New York City	United States	Madison Square Garden	88,625 / 88,625	$12,674,925
June 24	New York City	United States	Madison Square Garden	88,625 / 88,625	$12,674,925
June 27	Worcester	United States	Worcester's Centrum Centre	46,075 / 46,075	$6,439,890
June 28	Worcester	United States	Worcester's Centrum Centre	46,075 / 46,075	$6,439,890
June 30	Worcester	United States	Worcester's Centrum Centre	46,075 / 46,075	$6,439,890
July 1	Worcester	United States	Worcester's Centrum Centre	46,075 / 46,075	$6,439,890
July 4	Philadelphia	United States	Wachovia Center	30,575 / 30,575	$4,134,478
July 5	Philadelphia	United States	Wachovia Center	30,575 / 30,575	$4,134,478
July 7	East Rutherford	United States	Continental Airlines Arena	29,315 / 29,315	$4,437,345
July 8	East Rutherford	United States	Continental Airlines Arena	29,315 / 29,315	$4,437,345
July 11	Chicago	United States	United Center	59,591 / 59,591	$7,894,105
July 12	Chicago	United States	United Center	59,591 / 59,591	$7,894,105
July 14	Chicago	United States	United Center	59,591 / 59,591	$7,894,105
July 15	Chicago	United States	United Center	59,591 / 59,591	$7,894,105
July 18	Toronto	Canada	Air Canada Centre	52,160 / 52,160	$5,332,703
July 19	Toronto	Canada	Air Canada Centre	52,160 / 52,160	$5,332,703
July 21	Toronto	Canada	Air Canada Centre	52,160 / 52,160	$5,332,703
July 24	Atlanta	United States	Philips Arena	25,627 / 25,627	$3,450,874
July 25	Atlanta	United States	Philips Arena	25,627 / 25,627	$3,450,874
July 28	Sunrise	United States	Office Depot Center	28,208 / 28,208	$3,834,522
July 29	Sunrise	United States	Office Depot Center	28,208 / 28,208	$3,834,522
August 1	Miami	United States	American Airlines Arena	30,580 / 30,580	$4,145,760
August 2	Miami	United States	American Airlines Arena	30,580 / 30,580	$4,145,760
August 14	Manchester	England	Manchester Evening News Arena	27,320 / 27,320	$5,136,114
August 15	Manchester	England	Manchester Evening News Arena	27,320 / 27,320	$5,136,114
August 18	London	England	Earls Court Exhibition Centre	34,087 / 34,087	$6,356,207
August 19	London	England	Earls Court Exhibition Centre	34,087 / 34,087	$6,356,207
August 22	London	England	Wembley Arena	45,267 / 45,267	$9,809,717
August 23	London	England	Wembley Arena	45,267 / 45,267	$9,809,717
August 25	London	England	Wembley Arena	45,267 / 45,267	$9,809,717
August 26	London	England	Wembley Arena	45,267 / 45,267	$9,809,717
August 29 (Note: The August 29 show in Slane was the annual Slane Concert)	Slane	Ireland	Slane Castle	62,275 / 70,000	$6,575,339
September 1	Paris	France	Palais Omnisports de Paris-Bercy	68,000 / 68,000	$7,357,529
September 2	Paris	France	Palais Omnisports de Paris-Bercy	68,000 / 68,000	$7,357,529
September 4	Paris	France	Palais Omnisports de Paris-Bercy	68,000 / 68,000	$7,357,529
September 5	Paris	France	Palais Omnisports de Paris-Bercy	68,000 / 68,000	$7,357,529
September 8	Arnhem	Netherlands	GelreDome	73,300 / 73,300	$6,759,661
September 9	Arnhem	Netherlands	GelreDome	73,300 / 73,300	$6,759,661
September 13	Lisbon	Portugal	Pavilhão Atlântico	33,460 / 33,460	$3,286,166
September 14	Lisbon	Portugal	Pavilhão Atlântico	33,460 / 33,460	$3,286,166
Total				897,207 / 904,932 (99%)	$124,790,787

== Personnel ==
Adapted from the Re-Invention World Tour 2004 program.

=== Band ===
- Madonna – creator, vocals, guitar
- Donna De Lory - vocals
- Siedah Garrett - vocals
- Stuart Price - musical director, keyboards, guitar
- Marcus Brown - keyboards
- Michael McKnight - programmer, keyboards
- Monte Pittman - guitar
- Steve Sidelnyk - drums
- Lorne Cousin - bagpipes

=== Dancers ===
- Daniel "Cloud" Campos - dancer
- Reshma Gajjar - dancer
- Mihran Kirakosian - dancer
- Paul Kirkland - dancer
- Tamara Levinson - dancer
- Valerie "Raistalla" Moise - dancer
- Dawn Noel Pignuola - dancer
- Marilyn Ortiz - dancer
- Sean Aries Smith - dancer
- Seth Stewart - dancer
- Zach Woodlee - dancer
- Jason Young - dancer
- Sergie Ventura - skater

=== Choreographers ===
- Jamie King - choreographer, set designer, show director
- Stefanie Roos - assistant director, choreographer
- Talauega Brothers - choreographers
- Liz Imperio - choreographer
- Allen Dekko - drill Specialist
- Dreya Weber - aerial choreographer
- Armando Orzuzo - Tango choreographer
- Daniela Amoruso - Tango choreographer
- Karen Dyer - fire specialist
- Jason Lewis - consultant
- Stephen Kilbride - drum consultant

=== Wardrobe ===
- Arianne Phillips - designer
- Stella McCartney - designer
- Christian Lacroix - designer
- Karl Lagerfield for Chanel - designer

=== Crew ===
- Caresse Henry - artist management
- Shari Goldschmidt - business management
- Richard Feldstein - business management
- Liz Rosenberg - publicist
- Angela Becker - assistant to Madonna
- Jordana Steine - ticket coordinator
- George Tortarolo - ticket coordinator
- Kelli Frazier - ticket coordintor
- Angie Edgar- ticket coordintor
- Roy Bennett - lighting designer
- Peter Aquinde - lighting designer
- Sean Spuehler - sound designer
- Mirwais Ahmadzaï - music design
- Gina Brookee - artist make-up
- Gina Brookee - make-up artist
- Andy LeCompte - hair stylist
- Benny Collins - production manager
- Tony Villanueva - wardrobe supervisor
- Giovanni Bianco - artwork, logos, tourbook designer
- Steven Klein - tourbook photography, video projection
- Craig McDean - photography
- Dago Gonzalez - video projection
- Chris Cunningham - video projection

== See also ==
- List of highest-grossing concert tours
- List of highest-grossing concert tours by women

== Literary sources ==
- Gnojewski, Carol (2007). Madonna: Express Yourself. Enslow Publishing. ISBN 978-0766024427.
- Morgan, Michelle (2015). Madonna. Hachette. ISBN 978-1472119438.
- O'Brien, Lucy (2018). Madonna: Like an Icon. Bantam Press. ISBN 978-0-593-05547-2.
- Timmerman, Dirk (2007). Madonna Live! Secret Re-inventions and Confessions on Tour. Maklu. ISBN 978-9-085-95002-8.
