= Burning Up (Madonna song) =

1983 single by Madonna

Single by Madonna

from the album Madonna
- B-side: "Physical Attraction"
- Released: March 9, 1983
- Studio: Sigma Sound Studios (New York City)
- Genre: Dance; new wave
- Length: 3:45
- Label: Sire; Warner Bros.
- Songwriter: Madonna
- Producer: Reggie Lucas

Madonna singles chronology
| "Everybody" (1982) | "Burning Up" / "Physical Attraction" (1983) | "Holiday" (1983) |

Music video
- "Burning Up" on YouTube

"Burning Up" is a song written and recorded by American singer Madonna from her 1983 self-titled debut studio album. It was produced by Reggie Lucas, and released on March 9, 1983, as her second single, with "Physical Attraction" as B-side. Blending dance and new wave influences, it is driven by a bassline, sharp guitar riffs, and drum machines, while its lyrics conflate sexual desire with ambition, presenting a woman who asserts control through submission.

The release —billed as "Burning Up" / "Physical Attraction"— reached number three on Billboard's Dance Club Songs chart and number 13 in Australia. The accompanying Steve Barron-directed music video juxtaposed surreal imagery with a sequence in which Madonna, first shown vulnerable on a road, ultimately takes control behind the wheel of an Amphicar. Critics and scholars saw this as an early example of her use of sexual politics.

While initial critical reviews were divided, often questioning the singer's vocals, the song has since been reassessed as one of her most overlooked early works, praised for its raw energy and bold portrayal of female desire. "Burning Up" has been performed on four of Madonna's concert tours, the last being the Celebration Tour (2023–2024). It has been covered by acts ranging from Ciccone Youth to Iggy Pop and Britney Spears.

== Background ==
By late 1980, Madonna was playing drums and later guitar for Dan and Ed Gilroy's band Breakfast Club, performing in downtown Manhattan venues such as CBGB. Although she enjoyed the exposure, her ambition and increasingly prominent stage presence created tensions, and she soon left the group. That November she reconnected with Stephen Bray, a drummer from Ann Arbor and former boyfriend, who moved to New York to collaborate with her. Together they formed the band Emmy, and in 1981 secured a showcase at Max's Kansas City that drew the attention of Gotham Records. The deal ultimately fell through when the label pushed for a rock n roll sound while Madonna insisted on dance music and disco. The experience, however, strengthened her resolve and industry contacts. Immersed in New York's club scene, she studied emerging dance trends to inform her own songwriting and performance style, and with Bray recorded a four-track demo that included "Everybody", "Burning Up", and "Ain't No Big Deal".

Madonna actively promoted the tape at New York clubs, persuading DJ Mark Kamins to play it at Danceteria, where it was well received by audiences. Kamins then introduced her to Seymour Stein, president of Sire Records, who signed her to a contract covering three twelve-inch singles with an option for an album. Stein assigned Kamins to produce the first release, "Everybody", which was issued as Madonna's debut single on October 6, 1982. The track generated enough momentum in the dance market for Sire to begin planning a full album. Although Kamins expected to produce follow-up single "Burning Up", Sire instead appointed Warner Bros. producer Reggie Lucas, who had recently worked with Stephanie Mills. Lucas additionally contributed with two new songs: "Borderline" and "Physical Attraction". When "Burning Up" was released as a single, "Physical Attraction" was chosen as its B-side.

== Recording and composition ==
"Burning Up"
22-second audio sample of "Burning Up". It is a song that incorporates dance and new wave elements.

"Burning Up" was written by Madonna and produced by Reggie Lucas, with recording taking place at Sigma Sound Studios in New York. The session featured Stephen Bray and Paul Pesco on guitars and programming, Butch Jones, Fred Zarr, and Ed Walsh on synthesizers, and Bobby Malach on tenor saxophone. Background vocals were provided by Gwen Guthrie, Brenda White, and Chrissy Faith. Lucas recalled that Madonna's vocal delivery was strikingly uninhibited, with improvised vocal tags that, in his view, gave the track much of its erotic quality. Tensions soon developed, however, as Madonna felt his production strayed from the minimalist sound of her demos. Lucas ultimately left the project, after which Sire brought in John "Jellybean" Benitez —her boyfriend at the time— to remix the material; in the case of "Burning Up", he added further guitar riffs and vocal overdubs to create the final album version. According to Billboard's Chris Malone Méndez, the track signaled a move away from the post-disco style of "Everybody" toward a more pop-oriented sound. Madonna herself later described it as her "foray into electric guitars, rock and roll [and] hair music".

Musically, "Burning Up" has been noted a dance track with new wave influences, and a minimalist arrangement built on bass, single guitar, and drum machines. The Arizona Republic's Ed Masley observed that it echoed Michael Jackson's "winning" blend of heavy rock guitars and early 1980s dance beats. Rikky Rooksby, author of The Complete Guide to the Music of Madonna, likened its sound to Gary Numan and the "disco end of new romanticism". The track features prominent tom-tom fills reminiscent of Phil Collins and a guitar solo —elements that, while striking here, would not become characteristic of Madonna's later records. The Gazette remarked on Madonna's "squeaky-sultry, Kewpie doll voice" singing against an electro-disco rhythm section, interpreting the performance as projecting a woman seeking recognition as both equal to and distinct from men.

Lyrically, "Burning Up" conflates sexual desire with ambition, employing double entendres to explore themes of submission and self-assertion. The refrain repeats the same three lines, while the bridge intensifies the narrative through further double entendres about what she is prepared to do for her lover, culminating in the lines, "Unlike the others, I'll do anything / I'm not the same / I have no shame." James B. Twitchell interpreted these lyrics as rejecting pop music's conventional expectations for women.

== Release and chart performance ==
The double-sided single "Burning Up" / "Physical Attraction" was released on March 9, 1983. Its sleeve was designed and drawn by Madonna's friend Martin Burgoyne, featuring a grid of twenty stamp-sized portraits of the singer in different colors, with a pointillist portrait on the back. Matthew Lindsay of The Quietus described the artwork as an "'80s twist" on Andy Warhol and Roy Lichtenstein's cartoon pop art, with Madonna's face repeated in a style reminiscent of Warhol's Marilyn Diptych. Mark Bego, author of Madonna: Blond Ambition, observed that the design obscured her real skin tone, making her appear Puerto Rican or mulatto. "Burning Up" was later included on Madonna's 2009 compilation album Celebration. An early "bare-bones blueprint" demo was included on In the Beginning (1998), a collection of lo-fi recordings from 1980–1981.

The single debuted at number 66 on Billboard's Dance Club Songs chart for the week of April 9, 1983, and peaked at number three a month later. By September, it had sold more than 150,000 copies, according to a Warner Bros. Records advertisement in Radio & Records magazine. In Australia, the release entered the Kent Music Report singles chart in November 1983 and reached number 13 nearly eight months later. Bill Duff, then-manager of WEA's Victorian branch, recalled that when "Burning Up" was first issued in the country, it received little interest from radio programmers, and that it was not until the video for "Borderline" (1984) that Madonna began to gain broader attention. The single ranked at number 68 on the Kent Music Report's year-end chart for 1984.

== Critical reception ==
Upon release, "Burning Up" received a range of responses from music critics. Billboard's Brian Chin, reviewing the "Burning Up" / "Physical Attraction" double single, called it a "fast [...] terrific one-two punch". Rolling Stone's Don Shewey described "Burning Up" as "simple but clever". Marcia Smith of The Boston Globe considered it the album's strongest track, while Roger Le Lievre of The Ann Arbor News called it a "high-energy dance-rocker" —both singling out Paul Pesco's guitar work. For Entertainment Weekly, Jim Farber later noted that "Burning Up" proved Madonna could "also rock". In academic studies, Santiago Fouz-Hernández and Freya Jarman-Ivens praised its upbeat, dance-oriented qualities, while The Bryan-College Station Eagle's Linda R. Thornton characterized the single's material as "bubble-gum tunes with a good beat". AllMusic's Stephen Thomas Erlewine identified it —alongside "Physical Attraction"— for its "darker, carnal urgency".

Other writers were less favorable. Rikki Rooksby judged it "noticeably weaker" than other songs on the album. Terry Hazlett of the Observer–Reporter described it as "inoffensive, danceable [but] ultimately forgettable", while The Washington Times dismissed it as a "nugget better left buried". Reviewing the "Burning Up" / "Physical Attraction" single, Jack Lloyd of The Philadelphia Inquirer noted it had club appeal but argued that, "as something to listen to, it quickly wears out its welcome", criticizing its "droning, repetitious vocals". Richard Defendorf of the Orlando Sentinel remarked that while the arrangements were solid, Madonna's "tiny" voice left uncertainty as to whether she was an enjoyable novelty or an artist with lasting potential.

In retrospect, "Burning Up" has been reassessed more favorably, with critics often describing it as one of Madonna's most overlooked or underrated early singles. (Note: Attributed to multiple sources, including BBC News, The Detroit News, Entertainment Weekly, MRC, and the Portland Mercury.) Writers such as Matthew Jacobs (HuffPost) and Mayer Nissim (PinkNews) emphasized its punk and post-punk qualities, comparing it to early New Order or late Joy Division. Similarly, TheBacklot.com and The Arizona Republic praised its assertive energy and likened it to the work of Pat Benatar and Michael Jackson's "Beat It" (1983). Pitchfork's Jillian Mapes later deemed "Burning Up" a "striking" early single, and the staff of The Advocate ranked it among the sexiest songs of the 1980s. Critics have ranked "Burning Up" as one of Madonna's finest songs. (Note: Attributed to multiple sources, including The A.V. Club, The Arizona Republic, Billboard, TheBacklot.com, Classic Pop, The Daily Telegraph, The Detroit News, Entertainment Weekly, Jenesaispop, Parade, PinkNews, Rolling Stone, Slant Magazine, and USA Today.) Writing for Vanity Fair España, Guillermo Alonso named it her second-best single, praising its raw energy and depiction of a woman offering pleasure on her own terms.

== Music video ==
=== Production and synopsis ===
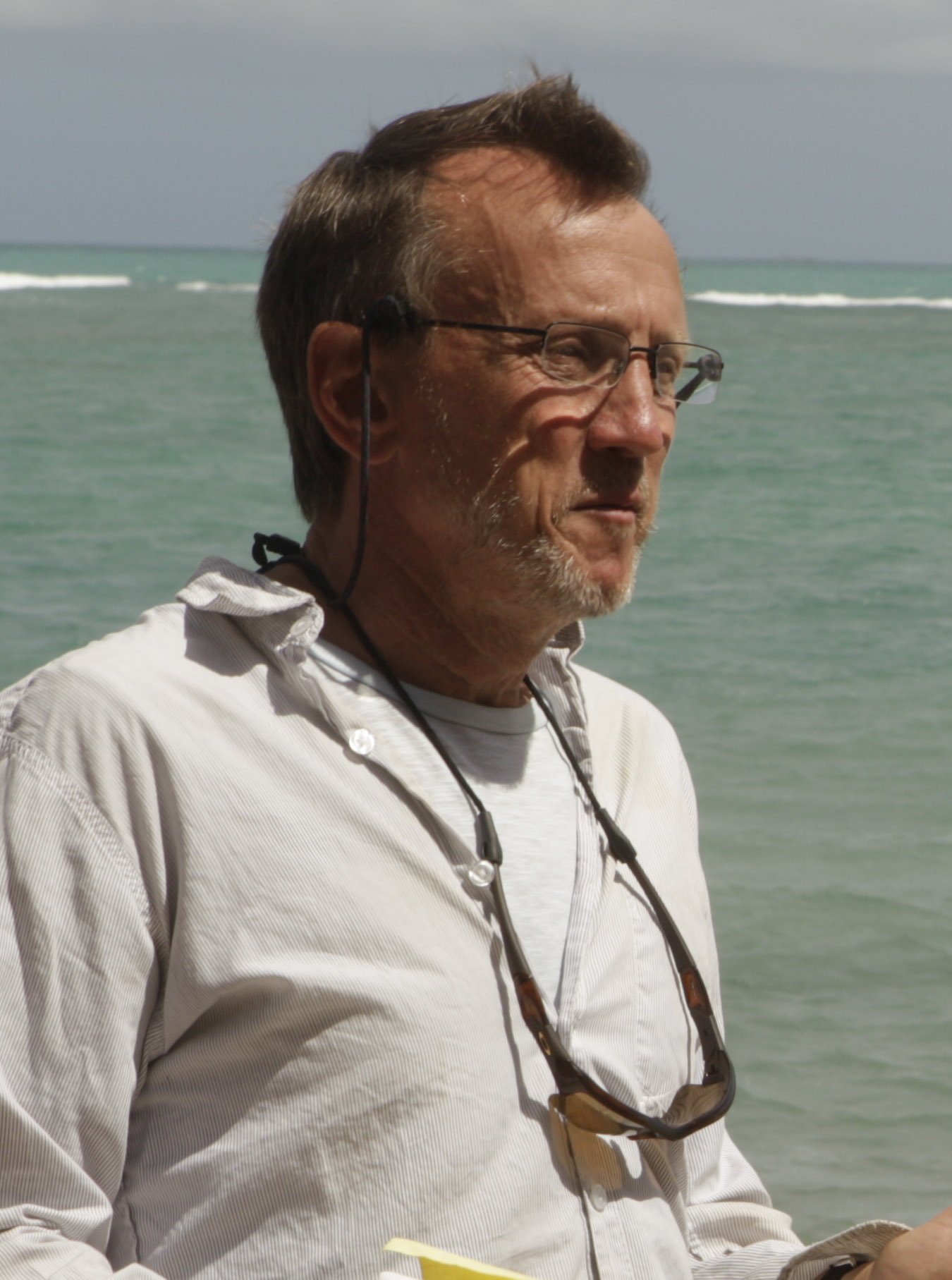
Steve Barron (pictured in 2012) directed the music video.

The music video for "Burning Up" was directed by Steve Barron, known for his work on Toto's "Africa" (1982), "Billie Jean" (1983) by Michael Jackson, and Eddy Grant's "Electric Avenue" (1983). Barron initially declined the project when approached by Sire executive Simon Fields, stating the song "didn’t have the atmosphere" he was looking for, but Fields convinced him that Warner Bros. believed Madonna was "gonna be massive". The director met with the singer in a SoHo squat where she was scantily clad, working out to a disco track; despite approaching the job begrudgingly, he found her charismatic and flirtatious, and her behavior inspired a scene in the video which she presses her face to the ground. Although he remained skeptical of the track itself, Madonna —an admirer of the "Billie Jean" video— persistently lobbied for his involvement until Barron agreed to direct.

Filmed over two nights in Los Angeles, the video's concept was not directly based on the lyrics but rather a "mish-mash" of Barron's visual ideas, as he admitted he didn't fully connect with the song. Madonna had significant input on her appearance. Barron recalled that "her dress was the most important thing that she wanted to talk about", noting how determined she was to control her look and styling. She wore crucifix earrings, styled by Maripol, who also provided the trademark black rubber bracelets made from typewriter drive belts. Debi Mazar worked as makeup artist, while Madonna's occasional lover Ken Compton appeared on screen. Barron later recounted a near-fatal incident during the shoot, when a seven-ton crane camera nearly toppled while positioned above Madonna as she lay singing in a boat; had it fallen, he said, "she would have been 100 percent dead". "Burning Up" was added to MTV the week of September 28, 1983. It can be found on Madonna's 2009 video compilation Celebration: The Video Collection.

Rolling Stone described the video as a mix of "disparate" images of illuminated busts and cars driving on water, intercut with shots of Madonna writhing in the middle of the road. It opens with colorful close-ups of her eye, red lips, a bouquet of daisies, an orange goldfish, and her white throat, before cutting to scenes of her spinning "like a whirling dervish". Other sequences show her in a short white dress, singing "with sexual desire" in the middle of the street. In one scene, Madonna appears about to be struck by a car driven by Compton —a blue Amphicar, an amphibious vehicle— before the video ends with her taking control behind the wheel herself.

=== Analysis and reception ===
Music video still of Madonna driving an Amphicar, a scene that both Lucy O'Brien and Caroline Sullivan noted as an early example of her subverting the traditional "female-as-victim" role.

Author Andrew Morton described the clip as the public's first glimpse of Madonna's "sexual politics", noting that the closing scene of her taking the wheel of the car and driving away symbolized her control. Chris Malone emphasized that it established her as "the one in charge" from the outset of her career. Matthew Lindsay added that the video epitomized 1980s postfeminism by linking sex with power, portraying Madonna as initially submissive but ultimately in control —a theme later paralleled by Janet Jackson on 1986's Control. Caroline Sullivan likewise argued that the imagery marked a shift away from the "female-as-victim" role, framing Madonna instead as the driver of her own narrative and desire.

Sullivan focused on the video's overt eroticism. She highlighted how Madonna’s parted lips and close-ups of her neck created a fetishistic quality, underscoring her command of sexual display. Rather than passively offering herself, she was seen to harness lust as a form of power, ultimately vanishing from the submissive frame and reappearing in control of the car. This interplay, according to the author, revealed two defining traits that would recur throughout her career: an unabashed erotic presence and a determination to remain in charge.

Further commentary has emphasized the video's symbolic and stylistic significance. In his book Madonna as postmodern myth, Georges-Claude Guilbert argued that the male character becomes irrelevant within the video, noting how she destabilizes the fixing and categorization of male sexuality in much the same way that she does with female sexuality. Jillian Mapes described it as "the first great wink to her signature subversion of power through sex", adding that Madonna's performance of "Like a Virgin" at the 1984 MTV Video Music Awards would have lacked context without the "slow, sensual burn" of "Burning Up".

Jon Pareles of The New York Times compared Madonna’s poses to those of Marilyn Monroe, while Rolling Stone identified the video as representative of early MTV's stylistic experimentation. Eric Diaz of Nerdist pointed to the enduring influence of its look —rubber bracelets, chains, and bleached roots— while Louis Virtel of TheBacklot.com called it a defining moment in Madonna's visual evolution. Bego highlighted its bold use of color contrasts —peach-toned skin, cherry-red lips, bright green lasers, and yellow-blonde hair— considering it one of her most appealing early clips despite its simple production. He added that although the single was not a commercial hit, the video generated a minor stir on MTV and introduced Madonna as the "dominatrix of the airwaves".

== Live performances ==
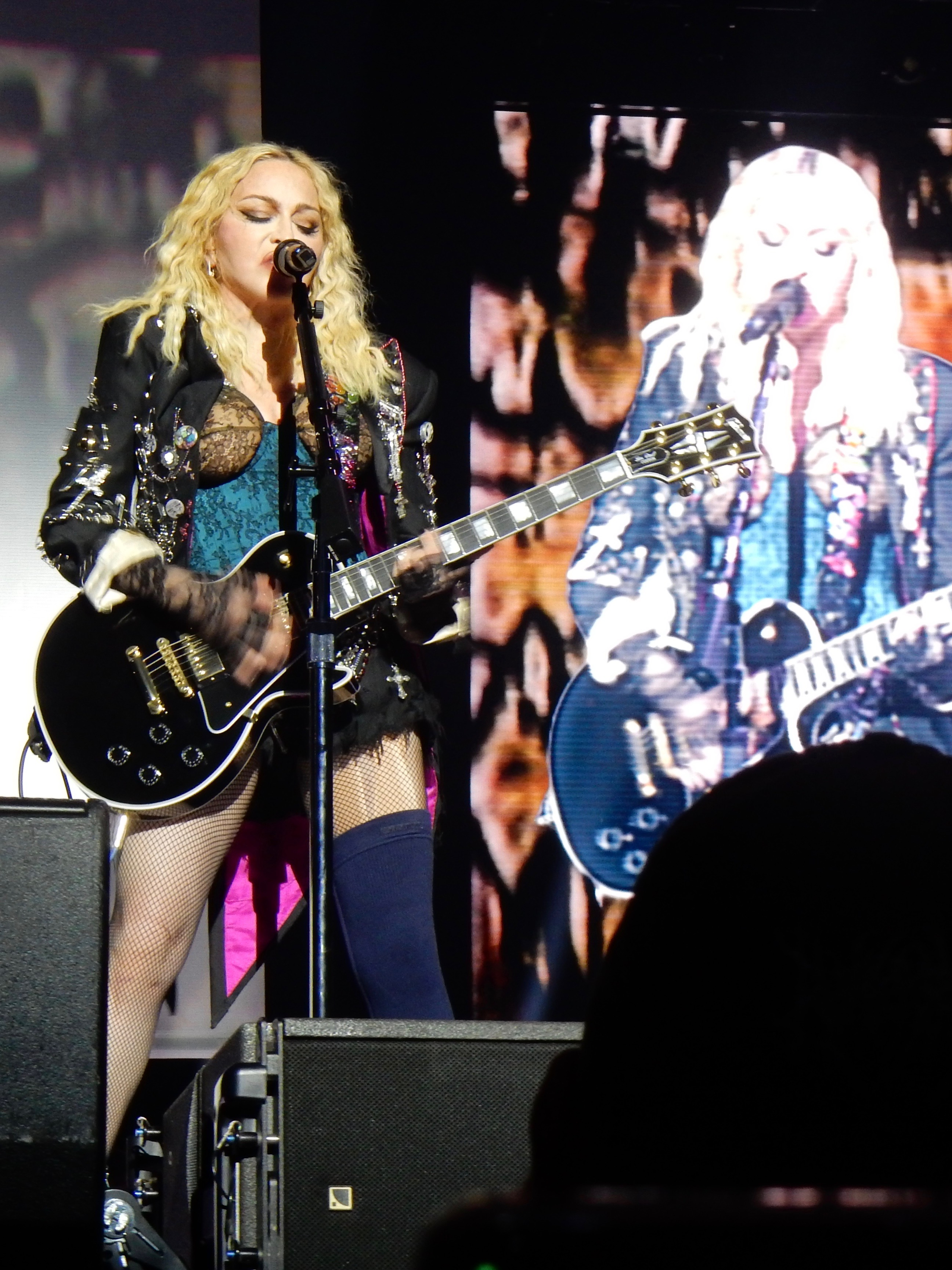
Madonna performing "Burning Up" on the Celebration Tour (2023―2024)

Madonna first performed an early version of "Burning Up" in 1981 at the Long Island bar Uncle Sam's. To promote the single's release in 1983, Sire sent her on a series of club appearances, which included shows in London at the Camden Palace and Le Beat Route Club, as well as Manchester's The Haçienda. She also performed the song at the Copa nightclub in Fort Lauderdale, alongside "Physical Attraction" and "Everybody". According to Andrew Morton, these early efforts were poorly received; Kamins recalled that British audiences "just didn't get it" and described their reaction as a "disaster".

The song was performed in four of Madonna's concert tours: Virgin (1985), Re-Invention (2004), Rebel Heart (2015–2016), and Celebration (2023–2024). On the first, "Burning Up" had Madonna crawling between the legs of her male dancers, a routine Pete Bishop of The Pittsburgh Press deemed "no racier than [...] Solid Gold". By contrast, the San Francisco Examiner praised it as the concert's "most exquisite moment", noting her hot pants, halter top, smoke effects, and sadomasochistic imagery.

On the Re-Invention Tour, Madonna gave the song a heavy metal interpretation, playing a Gibson Les Paul electric guitar while dressed in military fatigues. The performance included video projections of war and sexual imagery, which The New York Times' Kelefa Sanneh compared to camcorder footage evocative of the prisons of Abu Ghraib. The Daily Herald's Mark Guarino highlighted Madonna's ability to recast the song's "adolescent whine" into "adult certitude".

A similar arrangement was used on the Rebel Heart Tour, where Madonna performed with a Gibson Flying V and wore a nun-inspired outfit. Rappler described the rendition as "oozing with attitude and charisma". The performance was included on the tour's 2017 live album. The guitar-led version returned on the Celebration Tour, with Madonna dressed in a punk-style tailcoat designed by Dilara Fındıkoğlu. The performance ―which The Guardian's Laura Snapes described as "brilliant"― featured VHS-style visuals referencing the singer's early days at CBGB.

== Covers and use in popular media ==
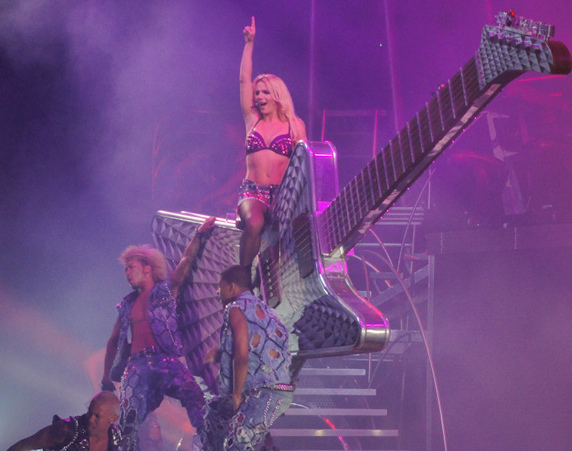
Britney Spears performing "Burning Up" during her Femme Fatale Tour (2011)

"Burning Up" appears in a scene of the 1984 film The Wild Life and is featured on its soundtrack. In 1986, New Alliance Records issued a Ciccone Youth single that included a cover of "Burning Up", recorded by Mike Watt with Greg Ginn. The track was later featured on the group's 1989 album The Whitey Album, where Rolling Stone's David Fricke described it as marked by "self-destructive obsession, powered by a frenetic drum machine and scrappy electric guitar". The song was later covered by singer Isadar for the 2006 compilation Scratching the Surface: Vol. 2 – Electro-Voice Sampler.

At Madonna's 2008 Rock and Roll Hall of Fame induction, Iggy Pop and the Stooges performed "punked-up" renditions of both "Burning Up" and "Ray of Light" (1998). In 2010, actor Jonathan Groff recorded a version of the song in connection with the Glee episode "The Power of Madonna". Although not performed on the episode, Groff's rendition was included as bonus track on the iTunes edition of the extended play (EP) Glee: The Music, The Power of Madonna.

Britney Spears covered "Burning Up" on her 2011 Femme Fatale Tour, performing the song while straddling a giant glitter-covered guitar. The rendition received mixed reviews; Rolling Stone's Barry Walters felt it lacked Madonna's "authority", while Billboard's Sarah Maloy described a leaked studio version as "glammed-up without a hint of the '80s to be found". The song was featured in a 2020 episode of the twelfth season of RuPaul's Drag Race, where contestants Brita Filter and Heidi N Closet performed it in a lip sync challenge —won by Heidi.

== Formats and track listings ==
- Burning Up / Physical Attraction Benelux, European, French, Japanese, Scandinavian and Spanish 7-inch vinyl
1. "Burning Up" (Edit) – 3:50
2. "Physical Attraction" (Edit) – 3:54
- Burning Up / Physical Attraction Australian, Dutch, European, French, Italian, Scandinavian, Spanish and US 12-inch vinyl
1. "Burning Up" (12" Version) – 5:56
2. "Physical Attraction" – 6:35
- Burning Up / Physical Attraction Australian 7-inch vinyl
1. "Burning Up" (Original LP Version) – 4:45
2. "Physical Attraction" – 6:35
- Physical Attraction / Burning Up Brazilian 7-inch vinyl
1. "Physical Attraction" (Edit) – 3:54
2. "Burning Up" (Alternate Edit) – 4:10
- Burning Up / Holiday Mexican 12-inch vinyl
1. "Burning Up" (Original LP Version) – 4:45
2. "Holiday" – 6:07
- Burning Up / Physical Attraction 1995 European 2-track CD single
1. "Burning Up" (12" Version) – 5:56
2. "Physical Attraction" – 6:35
- Burning Up / Physical Attraction 2023 digital single
1. "Burning Up" (2001 Remaster) – 3:45
2. "Burning Up" (7" Edit - 2023 Remaster) – 3:51
3. "Burning Up" (12" Mix - 2001 Remaster) – 5:59
4. "Physical Attraction" (7" Edit - 2023 Remaster) – 3:57
5. "Physical Attraction" (2001 Remaster) – 6:39

== Credits and personnel ==
Credits adapted from the Madonna album and twelve-inch single liner notes.

- Madonna – vocals, writer
- Reggie Lucas – producer
- Paul Pesco – guitar
- Jim Dougherty – sound engineer
- Martin Burgoyne – artwork

== Charts ==
=== Weekly charts ===
| Chart (1983–1984) | Peak position |
|---|---|
| Australia (Kent Music Report) | 13 |
| US Dance Club Songs (Billboard) listed as "Burning Up" / "Physical Attraction" | 3 |

=== Year-end charts ===
| Chart (1983–1984) | Position |
|---|---|
| Australia (Kent Music Report) | 68 |
| US Top Dance/Disco Singles (Billboard) with "Everybody" and "Physical Attraction" | 26 |

== Literary sources ==
- Bego, Mark (2000). Madonna: Blonde Ambition. Cooper Square Press. ISBN 978-0-8154-1051-5.
- Clerk, Carol (2012). Madonnastyle. Omnibus Press. ISBN 978-2-909828-89-3.
- Cross, Mary (2007). Madonna: A Biography. Greenwood Publishing Group. ISBN 978-0-313-33811-3.
- Fouz-Hernández, Santiago; Jarman-Ivens, Freya (2004). Madonna's Drowned Worlds. Ashgate Publishing, Ltd. ISBN 978-0-7546-3371-6.
- Gnojewski, Carol (2008). Madonna: Express Yourself. Enslow Publishing. ISBN 978-0-7660-2442-7.
- Guilbert, Georges-Claude (2002). Madonna as Postmodern Myth: How one star's self-construction rewrites sex, gender, Hollywood, and the American dream. McFarland & Company. ISBN 978-0-7864-1408-6.
- McKenzie, Michael (1985). Madonna: Lucky Star. Contemporary Books. ISBN 978-0-8092-5233-6.
- Morton, Andrew (2001). Madonna. Macmillan Publishers. ISBN 978-0-312-98310-9.
- O'Brien, Lucy (2007). Madonna: Like an Icon. Bantam Press. ISBN 978-0-06-089896-0.
- Rettenmund, Matthew (1995). Encyclopedia Madonnica. St. Martin's Press. ISBN 978-0-312-11782-5.
- Rooksby, Rikky (2004). The Complete Guide to the Music of Madonna. Omnibus Press. ISBN 978-0-7119-9883-4.
- Sullivan, Caroline (2014). Madonna: Her Story. Seven Oaks Publishing. ISBN 978-1-78177-179-2.
- Tannenbaum, Rob; Marks, Craig (2011). I Want My MTV: The Uncensored Story of the Music Video Revolution. Penguin Books. ISBN 978-1-101-52641-5.
- Taraborrelli, Randy J. (2001). Madonna: An Intimate Biography. Simon & Schuster. ISBN 978-0-283-07289-5.
- Twitchell, Robert B. (1997). For Shame: The Loss of Common Decency in American Culture. Macmillan Publishers. ISBN 978-0-312-19453-6.
