= Physical Attraction (song) =

Single by Madonna

from the album Madonna
- A-side: "Burning Up"
- Released: March 9, 1983
- Recorded: November 1982
- Studio: Sigma Sound, New York City
- Genre: Post-disco; R&B; synth-pop
- Length: 6:35
- Label: Sire; Warner Bros.
- Songwriter: Reggie Lucas
- Producer: Lucas

Madonna singles chronology
"Everybody" (1982)	"Burning Up" / "Physical Attraction" (1983)	"Holiday" (1983)

Licensed audio
- "Physical Attraction" on YouTube

"Physical Attraction" is a song by American singer Madonna. It was included on her debut studio album Madonna (1983). Written and produced by Reggie Lucas, the song was released as a double A-side single with "Burning Up" on March 9, 1983.

Upon release, "Physical Attraction" was generally well-received by critics, and retrospective reviews have described it as a "hidden gem". It charted at number 13 in Australia and number three on the Billboard Dance Club Songs chart in the United States.

== Background ==
In early 1980, Madonna was living in New York City and establishing her music career as a member of rock band the Breakfast Club, alongside her boyfriend Dan Gilroy; soon after, she was joined by Stephen Bray, her former boyfriend from Michigan, who became the band's drummer. Bray and Madonna left the Breakfast Club and, together, formed a new band, Emmy and the Emmys. They were soon signed by Gotham Records, but short after, Madonna quit the band and decided to pursue a solo career. She carried with her three of the demos she had created with Bray: "Everybody", "Ain't No Big Deal", and "Burning Up". In 1982, she met and befriended DJ Mark Kamins at Danceteria nightclub. After listening to "Everybody", Kamins took her to Sire Records, where Seymour Stein, the label's president, signed Madonna for two 12" singles.

Released in October of 1982, "Everybody" became a hit in the dance scene. The song's success led to the label approving the recording of an album, but the singer chose not to work with either Bray or Kamins, opting instead for Warner Bros. producer Reggie Lucas. Lucas wrote "Physical Attraction" after seeing Madonna perform live, and brought it to the project alongside another new composition, "Borderline". While working on the album, Madonna felt the producer was "moving [the songs] away from the sparse form of the original demos", something she did not approve of; Lucas ended up leaving the project without altering the songs.

== Recording and composition ==
"Physical Attraction" was produced by Reggie Lucas. Recording took place at New York's Sigma Sound Studios; personnel working on the song included Bray on programming and guitars, alongside Paul Pesco; Butch Jones, and Fred Zarr. Background vocals were provided by Gwen Guthrie, Brenda White, and Chrissy Faith. According to author Rikky Rooksby, the song is about Madonna being interested in "a suitor who she knows is no good for her but [she] is attracted to anyway". He described the song as a medium-paced track with a "chic guitar line" and "synth brass flourishes". Music critic Marc Andrews described the song's sound as "redressing disco in a post-punk electro sheen", and noted the song's similarities to a previous Lucas composition, the Stephanie Mills single "Sweet Sensation".

== Release and reception ==
The double-sided single of "Burning Up" and "Physical Attraction" was released on March 9, 1983. The artwork used for the 12" single was designed by the singer's friend Martin Burgoyne. "Physical Attraction" was later included on the compilations You Can Dance (1987) and Finally Enough Love: 50 Number Ones (2022). On the former, it was the only song not to have been remixed for the release.

Upon release, critical reception was generally positive. Billboard's Brian Chin described "Physical Attraction" as a "great midtempo r&b song". Don Shewey from Rolling Stone called it a "capsule history of high-school proms, with its sly references to The Association's 'Cherish' and Olivia Newton-John's 'Physical.'" Rikky Rooksby positively compared the song's spoken vocal sections to Madonna's later single "Erotica" but also called the song repetitive. Variety described it as "propulsive bubblegum-pop of the highest order." AllMusic's Stephen Thomas Erlewine singled "Physical Attraction" along with "Burning Up" as "great songs" from the album, and applauded their "darker, carnal urgency". "Physical Attraction" came in at number 37 in Louis Virtel's ranking, where it was named "six minutes and 40 seconds of romantic chemistry, poppy hooks, and one tremendous idea: 'Maybe we were meant to be together / even though we’ve never met before'". Billboard deemed it Madonna's forty-fifth greatest song: "With libidinous synths, hypnotic beats, airy vocals and a chirping vocal delivery, 'Physical Attraction' is – like the lyrics suggest – about turning your brain off for a moment and giving yourself over to absolute pleasure." The staff from The Advocate criticized the song, describing it as sounding like a "B-side for a Lisa Lisa single." Samuel R. Murrian from Parade placed it at number 35 of his ranking of Madonna songs, calling it "classic old-school Madonna", but criticizing the vocals. "Physical Attraction" has been singled as one of Madonna's best "deep-cuts" and "hidden gems" by Pitchfork, VH1, Slant Magazine, and Variety. In 2020, Treble magazine placed it on their list of "10 More Essential Synth-pop Songs", a companion piece to their earlier article "A History of Synth-pop in 50 Essential Songs".

"Burning Up" / "Physical Attraction" debuted on Billboard's Dance Club Songs charts at number 66 the week of April 9, 1983, peaking at number three one month later. By September 1983, according to a Warner Bros. Records advertisement in Radio & Records, the "Burning Up" / "Physical Attraction" 12" single had sold more than 150,000 copies. The song entered Australia's Kent Music Report in November 1983 and, almost eight months later, peaked at number 13.

== Formats and track listings ==
- Physical Attraction / Burning Up Brazilian 7-inch vinyl
1. "Physical Attraction" (Edit) – 3:54
2. "Burning Up" (Alternate Edit) – 4:10
- Burning Up / Physical Attraction Benelux, European, French, Japanese, Scandinavian and Spanish 7-inch vinyl
1. "Burning Up" (Edit) – 3:50
2. "Physical Attraction" (Edit) – 3:54
- Burning Up / Physical Attraction Australian, Dutch, European, French, Italian, Scandinavian, Spanish and US 12-inch vinyl
1. "Burning Up" (12" Version) – 5:56
2. "Physical Attraction" – 6:35
- Burning Up / Physical Attraction Australian 7-inch vinyl
1. "Burning Up" (Original LP Version) – 4:45
2. "Physical Attraction" – 6:35

- Burning Up / Physical Attraction 1995 European 2-track CD single
1. "Burning Up" (12" Version) – 5:56
2. "Physical Attraction" – 6:35
- Burning Up / Physical Attraction 2023 digital single
1. "Burning Up" (2001 Remaster) – 3:45
2. "Burning Up" (7" Edit - 2023 Remaster) – 3:51
3. "Burning Up" (12" Mix - 2001 Remaster) – 5:59
4. "Physical Attraction" (7" Edit - 2023 Remaster) – 3:57
5. "Physical Attraction" (2001 Remaster) – 6:39

== Credits and personnel ==
Credits adapted from the album and 12" single liner notes.

- Madonna – vocals
- Reggie Lucas – producer, writer
- John "Jellybean" Benitez – remixing
- Jim Dougherty – sound engineer
- Martin Burgoyne – artwork

== Charts ==
=== Weekly charts ===
Chart (1983–1984)	Peak position
Australia (Kent Music Report)	13
US Dance Club Songs (Billboard)	3

=== Year-end charts ===
Chart (1983–1984)	Position
Australia (Kent Music Report)	68
US Dance Club Songs (Billboard)	26
