= Holiday (Madonna song) =

1983 single by Madonna

- 1985 UK re-release picture sleeve

Single by Madonna

from the album Madonna
- B-side: "I Know It"; "Lucky Star"; "Think of Me"
- Released: September 7, 1983
- Studio: Sigma Sound (New York City)
- Genre: Dance-pop
- Length: 6:07
- Label: Sire; Warner Bros.
- Songwriters: Curtis Hudson; Lisa Stevens-Crowder
- Producer: John "Jellybean" Benitez

Madonna singles chronology
"Burning Up" / "Physical Attraction" (1983)	"Holiday" (1983)	"Lucky Star" (1983)

Alternate cover
- Artwork for the 1983 UK release

Licensed audio
- "Holiday" on YouTube

"Holiday" is a song recorded by American singer Madonna for her 1983 self-titled debut album. Written by Curtis Hudson and Lisa Stevens-Crowder of the group Pure Energy, the track was produced by John "Jellybean" Benitez. Originally intended for Pure Energy, the demo was rejected by their label and later offered to other artists before Benitez brought it to Madonna, who was seeking an additional song for her album. Recording took place at Sigma Sound Studios in New York City, with minor modifications to the original demo, including a piano solo by Fred Zarr. Released by Sire Records on September 7, 1983, as the lead single from the Madonna album, "Holiday" was preceded by a promotional double A-side release with "Lucky Star".

It is a dance pop track built around guitars, electronic claps, cowbell, and synthesized strings. Its lyrics celebrate the universal desire to take a break from everyday life. The single received positive reviews from critics, who praised its infectious melody, upbeat sound, and enduring appeal. Commercially, it became Madonna's first number-one hit on a Billboard chart, topping the Dance Club Songs survey, and reaching number 16 on the Billboard Hot 100. Internationally, it reached the top ten in several countries and charted multiple times in the United Kingdom, peaking within the top five during its 1985 and 1991 re-releases.

Madonna promoted "Holiday" through nightclub performances and television appearances in the United States and the United Kingdom. The song has remained a staple of her live performances, appearing on nearly all of her concert tours. It has also inspired numerous covers, samples, and references in popular culture.

== Background ==
"Since we weren't going to be able to record [the song] ourselves, we were really hoping it would fall into the hands of someone who was going to do it justice. [...] We were a little nervous at first [but] once we met Madonna, I knew she was gonna go somewhere. I just didn't know to what level".

— Curtis Hudson on Madonna recording "Holiday".

"Holiday" was written and composed by Curtis Hudson and Lisa Stevens-Crowder, former spouses and members of the group Pure Energy. The song originated from a keyboard chord progression developed by Stevens-Crowder, who initially conceived it as a ballad. After hearing the progression, Hudson developed the melody, contributed the bassline and the hook "Holiday, celebrate", while Stevens-Crowder later added the line "It would be so nice". Hudson stated that the lyrics were inspired by the negative news and social tensions of the time and were written in approximately thirty minutes.

The pair then recorded a demo with Stevens-Crowder on vocals and submitted it to their label, Prism Records, which declined to release it. DJ and producer John "Jellybean" Benitez, who knew the pair through New York City's Fun House nightclub and had previously remixed Pure Energy's recordings, eventually acquired the demo and pitched the song to several artists, including Mary Wilson from The Supremes, Phyllis Hyman, and disco group The Ritchie Family, all of whom passed on it. Hudson and Stevens-Crowder were not directly involved in the song's pitching, as they still hoped Pure Energy would get to record it.

In early 1983, Madonna was recording her first studio album with Warner Bros. producer Reggie Lucas and Benitez, whom she was dating at the time. The album had been green-lit by Sire Records following the success of her debut single "Everybody" (1982) in the dance scene. However, there was not enough material to complete the album; aside from "Everybody", the available tracks were "Burning Up", "Lucky Star", "Think of Me", "I Know It", and "Ain't No Big Deal", the latter of which became unavailable after being given to disco act Barracuda. Lucas contributed "Physical Attraction" and "Borderline", but one additional song was still needed.

Benitez and Lucas were then approached by Sire A&R executive Michael Rosenblatt, who sought one more uptempo pop song to complete the record; they were told that whoever supplied the track would be allowed to produce it. Benitez subsequently presented "Holiday", which Rosenblatt selected for the album, before playing the demo for Madonna, who immediately embraced it. Although Hudson and Stevens-Crowder were initially reluctant to have Madonna record the song, having originally envisioned it for a black artist, they ultimately agreed after meeting the singer in person.

== Recording ==
"We cut the rhythm track in a day and got the song really poppin'. Everybody was really happy. Madonna was in the studio throughout the recording [...] She's a very hands-on type of person. But matching the demo was a big concern for us—down to the string sounds. I didn't want to get away from that, because Jellybean and Madonna felt the demo had a certain magic".

— Hudson reflecting on the recording sessions for "Holiday".

Produced by Benitez, "Holiday" was recorded at the Sigma Sound Studios in New York. Even though he had previously worked as a remixer, Benitez later recalled that the song marked his first production "from scratch". Warner Bros. gave him one week to complete the recording, informing him that if he could finish the song by the following Friday, "you can make the album". Benitez recalled laboring "night and day" to complete the track before the deadline. Working from Pure Energy's demo, the production largely retained its original arrangement and instrumentation. Benitez assembled the musicians and translated the demo's ideas into the final recording, reportedly vocalizing individual parts to guide the performers.

Hudson played guitar, his brother Raymond played bass, and Fred Zarr contributed keyboards, while Madonna added percussion by playing the cowbell heard at the beginning of the song. During rehearsals, Madonna asked Hudson whether he intended to play the guitar "full funk", as it was on the demo. Although initially annoyed, Hudson later praised her attention to detail, recalling: "How many artists even pay attention to that?" Benitez ultimately kept the guitar part unchanged. Background vocals were provided by Norma Jean Wright and Tina Baker.

Madonna requested to record her vocals alone in the studio in order to develop her own interpretation of the song. While Stevens-Crowder's vocals on the demo were more soulful and gospel-influenced, Madonna's performance gave the track a more pop-oriented sound. Despite being initially uncertain about her rendition, Hudson later said that Madonna brought "a kind of innocence" to the lyrics. Stevens-Crowder likewise felt the singer "captured the soul I put into [the song], but she added her own flavor. She didn't try to copy it. Madonna did Madonna".

Before the recording was finalized, Benitez and Madonna brought the tape to Zarr, who added what the singer described as "Zarrisms"—creative flourishes that included the piano solo featured near the end of the track. Zarr also replaced the LinnDrum used on the demo with an Oberheim DMX drum machine. Although Hudson sought a production credit for his work on "Holiday", Benitez was ultimately credited as the sole producer due to his existing relationship with Madonna and role in presenting the song to the label. Pure Energy debated the issue internally before deciding to prioritize the exposure the song could bring them as songwriters.

== Composition ==
"Holiday"
31-second audio sample of "Holiday", featuring the song's repeated "Holiday/Celebrate" refrain.

Musically, "Holiday" is a dance-pop song built around a repeating four-bar chord progression and an electronic groove driven by synthesizers, percussion and funk-influenced guitar work. The track opens with a chord sequence that author Rikky Rooksby compared to Cyndi Lauper's "Time After Time" (1984). Its arrangement combines "cascading" synthesized strings, electronic handclaps, a prominent Moog bassline and a Chic-inspired guitar line reminiscent of Nile Rodgers' playing style. The percussion has been described as "Latin disco", while the keyboard textures recall the early work of Prince. Structurally, the song places greater emphasis on its central hooks than on a conventional verse–chorus form format. Built around the repeated refrains "holiday", "celebrate" and "celebration", the composition functions as what Rooksby described as a "prolonged chorus". The arrangement is further driven by the interplay between Madonna's vocals and the song's guitars, keyboards, percussion and piano accompaniment.

According to AllMusic, Madonna delivers the "Holiday/Celebrate" hook in a restrained, almost deadpan manner, while adopting a more sultry lower register during the verses. Billboard noted that her "guileless" vocal performance complements the song's simple, celebratory message, with "sunshine synths", funky guitars and prominent cowbell accompanying the melody. Lyrically, "Holiday" centers on themes of escapism and temporary relief from everyday concerns, with a communal message of celebration reminiscent of Kool & the Gang's "Celebration" (1980). Hudson described the song as a call for a "universal holiday", explaining: "Just that one day we could get away. That would be a great thing for this world".

== Release ==
Prior to its commercial release, Benitez debuted "Holiday" at the Fun House and later supplied a copy to Larry Levan for play at the Paradise Garage, where it gained exposure in New York's club scene. Although "Lucky Star" was initially promoted as the A-side of a promotional double-sided release pairing the two songs, "Holiday" entered the Dance Club Songs chart on August 27, 1983 and received stronger club support. Its success prompted Sire to release it as Madonna's third commercial single and as the lead single from her debut album on September 7, 1983.

Unlike the "generic" artwork used for her first two releases, "Everybody" and "Burning Up", the cover of "Holiday" prominently featured Madonna. According to Rooksby, early pressings still omitted her image because the label wanted to avoid revealing too soon that she was not black. Madonna later told New Musical Express magazine that the misunderstanding had not offended white audiences, but believed it had unsettled some radio programmers in the American South.

In the United Kingdom, "Holiday" was first released on January 2, 1984, and reissued the following year at the height of "Madonna fever". A third re-release followed in May 27, 1991 to promote The Immaculate Collection (1990), Madonna's first greatest hits album. It was accompanied by the limited-edition four-track extended play (EP) The Holiday Collection, issued on June 1st. A dub version of "Holiday" was included on Madonna's first remix album You Can Dance (1987), while an edited version appears on The Immaculate Collection. The song was subsequently featured on Madonna's compilation albums Celebration (2009) and Finally Enough Love: 50 Number Ones (2022), the latter including a slightly extended version of the original seven-inch single version.

== Critical reception ==
According to Gay Times, "Holiday" was Madonna's first single to achieve significant acclaim, following the lukewarm reception of "Everybody" and "Burning Up". Rooksby deemed it "as infectious as the plague", while author J. Randy Taraborrelli called it a "festive, infectious anthem" that quickly became a staple of dance clubs across America. Robert Matthew-Walker wrote that the song "bears no signs of inexperience" and praised its "memorable" and "immediately appealing" melody. Author Lucy O'Brien highlighted its production, citing Fred Zarr's closing piano riff and "bubbling Latin undertow" as key elements of Madonna's early sound. Adam Sexton praised its "ineffable charm", describing "Holiday" as a "loping disco ditty"; Mary Cross commended its simplicity and broad appeal, calling it an "excellent addition" to the Madonna album.

Billboard called it a "standard dance tune" elevated by Madonna's vocal charisma, while Rolling Stone's Don Shewey found it simple but clever. AllMusic highlighted its "effervescent" quality and electronic groove. Pitchfork praised its "feel-good wiggle", and Slant Magazine and the Portland Mercury described it as "airy" and "sparkly", respectively. Critics have also emphasized its warmth and escapist qualities. Billboard ranked it among Madonna's most carefree singles, while Melissa Ruggieri of USA Today called it an "energetic bop with the sole purpose of promoting relaxation". The Guardian's Jude Rogers described it as a "blissfully simple" song that hasn't lost its "freshness or warmth". Enio Chiola from PopMatters noted the track's appeal, arguing that even casual listeners would find it difficult to resist, and David Moynihan of Digital Spy called it a "feel-good pop giant" as well as "the closest thing we have to bottled sunshine".

Retrospective critics have ranked "Holiday" among Madonna's best recordings. (Note: Attributed to multiple sources, including The A.V. Club, The Arizona Republic, Billboard, TheBacklot.com, Classic Pop, The Daily Telegraph, The Detroit News, Entertainment Weekly, Forbes, Gay Star News, Jenesaispop, NME, Parade, PinkNews, PopMatters, Rolling Stone, and USA Today.) Matthew Rettenmund wrote that it had aged "remarkably well", while PinkNews similarly argued that it still sounds fresh decades after its release. Billboard noted the enduring appeal of its message and its status as an anthem within the LGBTQ community during the HIV/AIDS crisis, whereas Slant Magazine credited its continued popularity to the combination of its "immaculate" arrangement and Madonna's vocal performance. PopMatters and HuffPost both described "Holiday" as one of Madonna's defining recordings, with the former also calling it "the staple party song". Taraborrelli identified "Holiday", alongside "Borderline", as one of the most important recordings of Madonna's early career, crediting the two songs with helping establish her presence in popular music. Entertainment Weekly referred to it as Madonna's best dance anthem and "the prototype for everything from 'Into the Groove' to 'Living for Love'". The Arizona Republic wrote: "The production hasn't aged as well as, say, 'Into the Groove', but the melody? That's timeless". "Holiday" was included in Bruce Pollock's Rock Song Index: The 7500 Most Important Songs for the Rock & Roll Era.

== Chart performance ==
In the United States, the double-sided single "Holiday" / "Lucky Star" reached number one on Billboard's Dance Club Songs chart dated September 24, 1983, giving Madonna her first number-one hit on any Billboard survey. It remained at the top for five consecutive weeks and finished 1983 as the third best-performing song on the year-end Dance Club Songs chart. As a stand-alone single, "Holiday" debuted at number 88 on the Billboard Hot 100 on October 29, 1983, and peaked at number 16 in January 1984. This marked a milestone for Benitez, becoming the first song produced by an active club DJ to reach the Hot 100. "Holiday" was later ranked number 79 on Billboard's year-end Hot 100 chart for 1984. Despite not entering the Hot 100's top ten, Madonna later referred to "Holiday" as one of her favorite hits. As of August 2024, Billboard ranked it as her 37th most successful Hot 100 entry. In Canada, "Holiday" peaked at number 32 on the RPM 50 Singles chart, becoming Madonna's first top 40 hit in the nation.

Internationally, "Holiday" became Madonna's first major hit in several territories. In the United Kingdom, it peaked at number six upon its initial release in 1984. During its 1985 reissue, the single spent three weeks in the top 40 before climbing into the top 10 and eventually reaching a new peak of number two, behind Madonna's own "Into the Groove". The 1991 reissue also proved successful, reaching number five. With over 700,000 copies sold, "Holiday" remains Madonna's fourth most successful single in the UK. Elsewhere, the song reached number four in Australia and number seven in New Zealand, while charting within the top three in Finland, Ireland and Italy, and the top ten in Belgium and the Netherlands. On the European Hot 100 Singles chart, "Holiday" peaked at number 14 in March 1984, re-entered at number 80 following its 1985 reissue, and later reached a new peak of number 13 during its 1991 re-release. By September 1985, sales of the single had surpassed 1.5 million copies across Europe. In a 2012 interview, Hudson and Stevens-Crowder revealed that the song's commercial success allowed them to leave a boarding house and improve their financial situation.

== Live performances ==
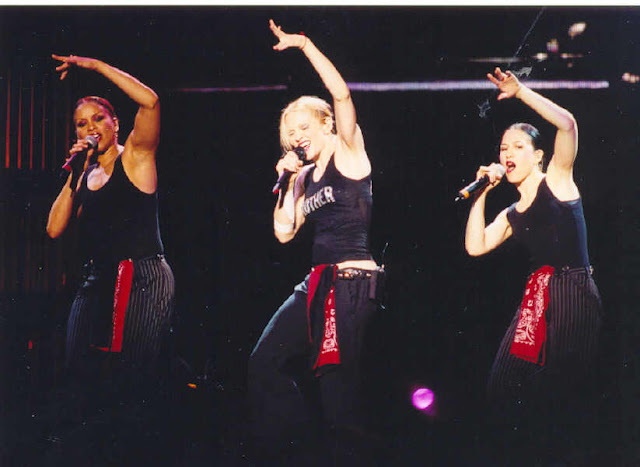
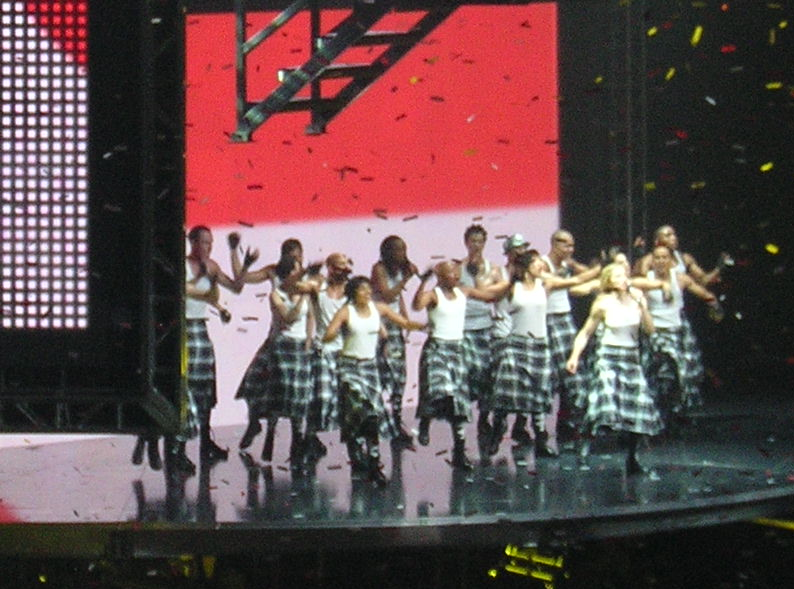
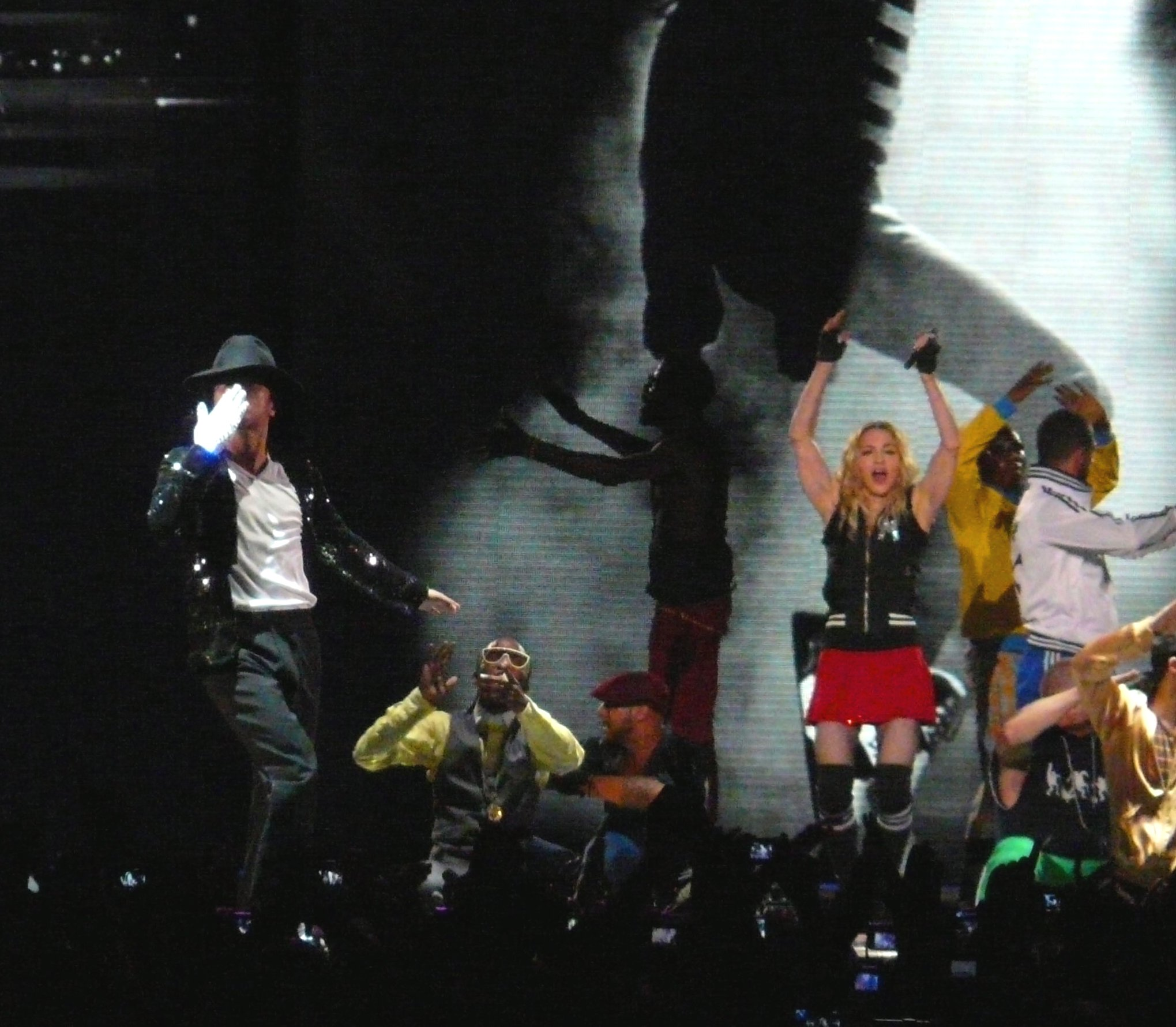
The song's performances on the Drowned Word (top), Re-Invention (center) and Sticky & Sweet tours (bottom)

Madonna first performed "Holiday" live at New York's Studio 54 on June 4, 1983, prior to its commercial release. To promote the single, she performed it on several television programs and at club venues in the United Kingdom and the United States. She sang the song on American television program Solid Gold and at London's Camden Palace, where The Guardian praised her vocals and stage presence. On January 14, 1984, she performed the song on American Bandstand and was interviewed by host Dick Clark, to whom she stated that her ambition was "to rule the world". Two weeks later, on January 27, she sang "Holiday" at Manchester's The Haçienda as part of a live broadcast of Channel 4's The Tube, marking her first performance on British television. She later performed the song on the BBC program Top of the Pops.

With the exception of the Madame X Tour (2019–2020), "Holiday" has been featured in nearly all of Madonna's concert tours. During the Virgin Tour of 1985, it was performed as the second number of the show. Accompanied by two male dancers, she sang and danced while playing a tambourine. Terry Hazlett of The Observer–Reporter observed that everytime she tossed the tambourine into the air and caught it, the crowd reacted "as if it were a World Series catch". A recording of the performance at Detroit's Cobo Arena was included in the tour's video release. On July 13, 1985, Madonna performed the song at the Philadelphia Live Aid benefit concert, where she jokingly remarked that she would not remove her jacket because "[the media] might hold it against me ten years from now".

"Holiday" was the closing number of the Who's That Girl World Tour (1987). Wearing a red sequined halter bustier and matching pants, Madonna performed the song as a sing-along with the audience. Reviewing the concert, Richard Harrington of The Washington Post cited "Holiday" among the tour's standout dance numbers. A performance from this tour was included on the video release Ciao Italia: Live from Italy (1988). The Blond Ambition World Tour's (1990) performance saw Madonna in a polka-dot ensemble designed by Jean Paul Gaultier, consisting of a short bolero jacket paired with white trousers trimmed with matching flounce. People magazine singled out the number as one of the tour's "frothiest", whereas The New York Times' Jon Pareles criticized Madonna's vocals. Performances of "Holiday" were featured on the tour's LaserDisc release, filmed during the final show in Nice, France, and in Madonna: Truth or Dare (1991), the documentary chronicling the tour. The performance from Truth or Dare was subsequently released as a promotional music video and earned four nominations at the 1992 MTV Video Music Awards.

On the Girlie Show (1993), "Holiday" was presented as a military-themed number featuring a call-and-response routine. Madonna and her dancers wore trench coats and performed before a large American flag backdrop. A rendition from the Sydney concert was featured in The Girlie Show: Live Down Under (1994) video release. At a promotional concert for her eight studio album Music (2000) at London's Brixton Academy, Madonna performed "Holiday" wearing a top emblazoned with the names of her children. "Holiday" was one of only two tracks from her 1980s catalogue performed on the Drowned World Tour (2001), where it was updated with a sample of Stardust's "Music Sounds Better with You" (1998). Sal Cinquemani of Slant Magazine singled out the performance as one of the show's highlights. The rendition from the Detroit concert on August 26 was released on the tour's video release.

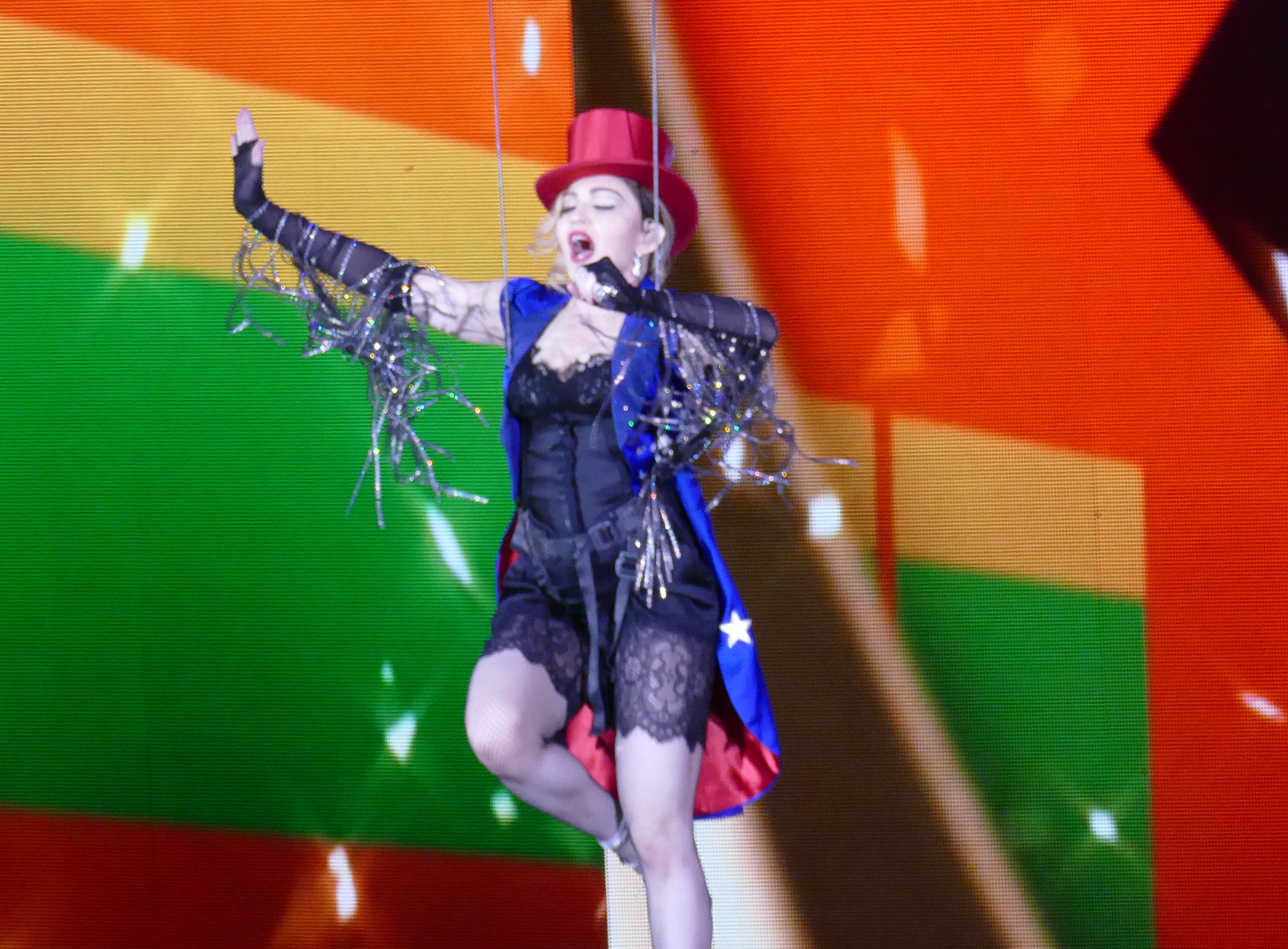
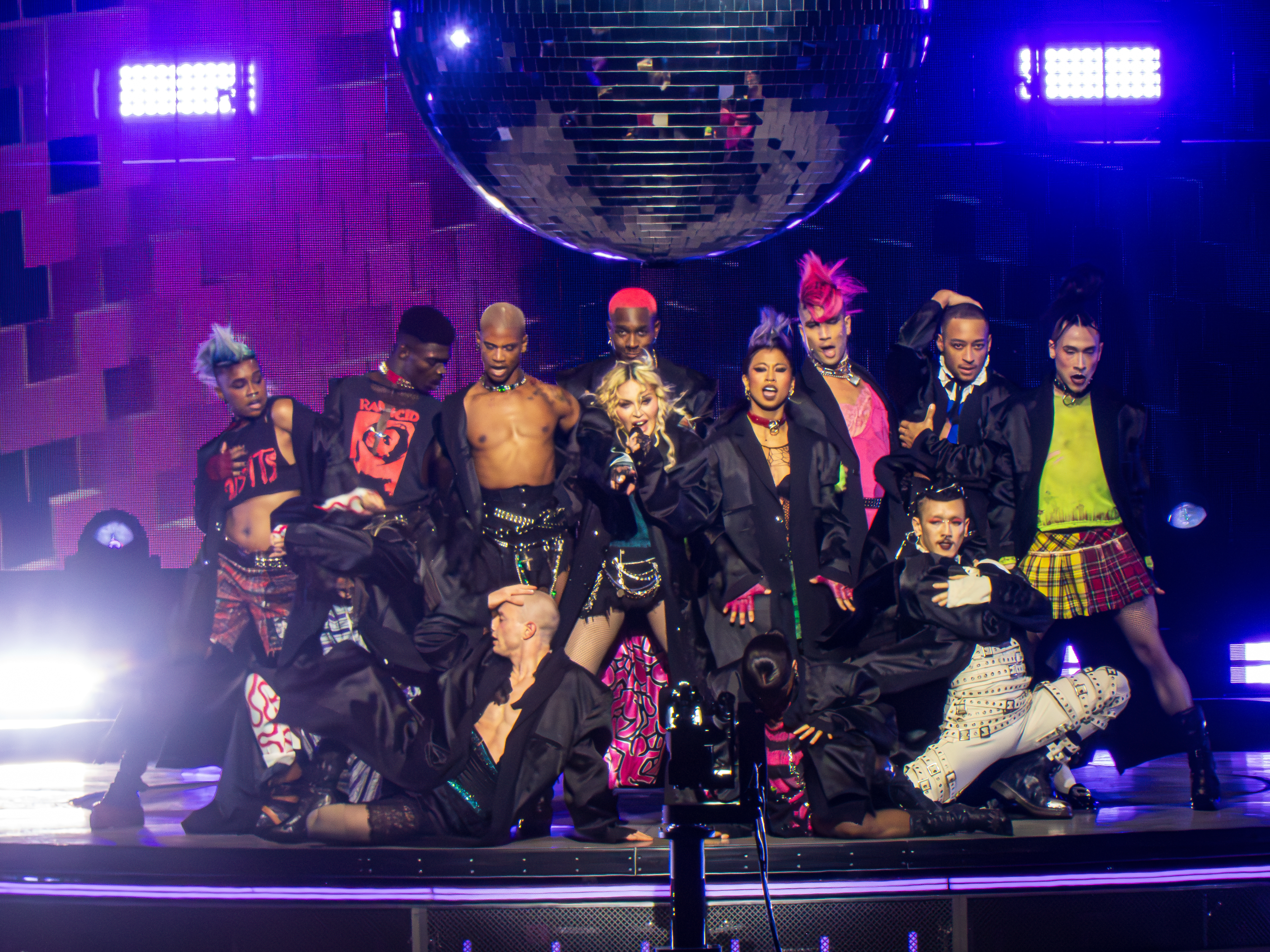
Madonna performing "Holiday" on the Rebel Heart (top) and Celebration (bottom) tours.

"Holiday" closed the Re-Invention World Tour (2004) in a tribal-themed performance. Madonna and her dancers performed wearing kilts, with flag imagery displayed on the video screens and confetti raining over the audience. The Manchester Evening News' Paul Taylor referred to it as the "most genuinely thrilling moment" of the evening. A recording of the performance appeared on Madonna's first live album, I'm Going to Tell You a Secret (2006). On the Confessions Tour (2006), "Holiday" was sampled as part of "The Duke Mixes the Hits", a medley that also incorporated elements of "Borderline", "Dress You Up" (1985), and "Erotica" (1992). At a Toronto stop of the Sticky & Sweet Tour (2008), Madonna performed "Holiday" a cappella at the audience's request. For the 2009 extension of the tour, the song was restored to the set list in full and incorporated a tribute to Michael Jackson, with dancer Kento Mori recreating his signature moonwalk choreography to a medley of "Billie Jean" and "Wanna Be Startin' Something" (1983).

"Holiday" was among the songs sampled in "Radio Dial Static", a video interlude featured on the MDNA Tour (2012). The song was also performed live at select dates of the tour. During the final show in Córdoba, Argentina, Madonna performed it with a megaphone after a generator disrupted the set. On April 9, 2015, Madonna appeared on The Tonight Show Starring Jimmy Fallon, where she performed "Holiday" on classroom instruments alongside Fallon and the Roots. "Holiday" closed the Rebel Heart Tour (2015–2016), with Madonna performing draped in an American flag, accompanied by dancers dressed in "Gatsby-style" attire. At the end of the song, she was lifted offstage by a harness and disappeared behind video screens. Ed Masley of The Arizona Republic praised the "triumphant" encore, whereas Joey DiGuglielmo of the Washington Blade found it anticlimactic. The performance was included on the tour's 2017 live album. A ukulele version was performed at the Madonna: Tears of a Clown shows (2016), with the singer donning clown attire.

"Holiday" was performed on the Celebration Tour (2023–2024), incorporating elements of Chic's "I Want Your Love" (1978). Performed beneath a giant disco ball on a circular stage, the number recreated the Paradise Garage nightclub and featured Bob the Drag Queen as a bouncer who denied Madonna entry.

== Cover versions and usage ==
"Holiday" has been covered, sampled, and referenced in popular culture since its release. In 1986, Dutch duo MC Miker G & DJ Sven released "Holiday Rap", a rap adaptation of "Holiday" that coincided with the release of Madonna's third studio album True Blue. The single became a top-ten hit in several countries, including France, the Netherlands, and Sweden. The song was later covered by British band Heaven 17 for the 1999 tribute album Virgin Voices Vol. 1: A Tribute to Madonna, and by French-Dutch group Mad'House on their 2002 album Absolutely Mad. "Holiday" was recorded by American girl group Girl Authority for their album Road Trip (2007), while American singer Kelis incorporated the song into a 2010 live mashup with her 2003 single "Milkshake. In 2021, American indie pop duo She & Him released a cover of "Holiday" as part of the tenth-anniversary reissue of their Christmas album A Very She & Him Christmas (2011).

Samples of the Holiday Rap were used by Australian group the Avalanches in their 2000 album Since I Left You, and in the 2004 Will & Grace musical number "He's Hot!" American singer Jessica Simpson's 2006 single "A Public Affair" was criticized for its similarities to "Holiday", an influence Simpson herself acknowledged. In 2020, American actress Cassandra Peterson, in character as Elvira, released "Don't Cancel Halloween", a parody of "Holiday" that laments the impact of the COVID-19 pandemic on Halloween celebrations. Adam Sandler's character performs "Holiday" in The Wedding Singer (1998), and it inspired the title of a two-part episode of Degrassi: The Next Generation.

== Formats and track listings ==
- US twelve-inch promo single
1. A. "Lucky Star" – 5:30
2. B. "Holiday" – 6:08
- US seven-inch vinyl
1. "Holiday" (Edit) – 4:07
2. "I Know It" – 3:44
- UK seven-inch vinyl
1. "Holiday" (Edit) – 4:07
2. "Think of Me" – 4:52
- UK twelve-inch picture disc
1. "Holiday" – 6:07
2. "Think of Me" – 4:52
- 1991 UK cassette single / The Holiday Collection EP
1. "Holiday" – 6:09
2. "True Blue" – 4:17
3. "Who's That Girl" – 3:58
4. "Causing a Commotion (Note: Listed as "Causin' a Commotion"; the version included is the "Silver Screen Single Mix".)" – 4:06
- 1991 UK twelve-inch vinyl
1. "Holiday" (LP version) – 6:09
2. "Where's the Party" (You Can Dance remix edit) – 4:22
3. "Everybody" (You Can Dance remix edit) – 4:57

== Credits and personnel ==
Credits adapted from the Madonna album liner notes.

- Madonna – vocals, cowbell
- John "Jellybean" Benitez – producer
- Curtis Hudson – songwriter, guitar
- Lisa Stevens-Crowder – songwriter
- Fred Zarr – drums, Moog bass, OB-X synthesizer, Fender Rhodes, acoustic piano
- Raymond Hudson – bass
- Bashiri Johnson – percussion
- Tina Baker – background vocals
- Norma Jean Wright – background vocals

== Charts ==
=== Weekly charts ===
1983—1984 weekly chart performance for "Holiday"
Chart (1983–1984)	Peak position
Australia (Kent Music Report)	4
Belgium (Ultratop 50 Flanders)	6
Canada Top Singles (RPM)	32
Canada (The Record)	34
European Hot 100 (Music & Media)	14
Ireland (IRMA)	2
Netherlands (Single Top 100)	7
New Zealand (Recorded Music NZ)	7
Switzerland (Schweizer Hitparade)	18
UK Singles (Official Charts)	6
UK Dance (Music Week)	1
US Billboard Hot 100	16
US Dance Club Songs (Billboard) with "Lucky Star"	1
US Hot R&B/Hip-Hop Songs (Billboard)	25
US Cash Box Top 100	12
US CHR & Pop Charts (Radio & Records)	15
West Germany (GfK)	9

1985 weekly chart performance for "Holiday"
Chart (1985)	Peak position
European Hot 100 (Music & Media)	80
Finland (Suomen virallinen lista)	3
Italy (Musica e dischi)	22
Netherlands (Single Top 100)	10
Sweden (Sverigetopplistan)	20
UK Singles (Official Charts)	2

1991 weekly chart performance for "Holiday"
Chart (1991)	Peak position
Belgium (Ultratop 50 Flanders)	40
European Hot 100 (Music & Media)	13
France (SNEP)	37
Ireland (IRMA)	3
Luxembourg (Radio Luxembourg)	5
Netherlands (Single Top 100)	24
UK Singles (Official Charts)	5

2023 weekly chart performance for "Holiday"
Chart (2023)	Peak position
Japan Hot Overseas (Billboard Japan)	14

=== Year-end charts ===
1983 year-end chart performance for "Holiday"
Chart (1983)	Peak position
US Dance Club Songs (Billboard) with "Lucky Star"	3

1984 year-end chart performance for "Holiday"
Chart (1984)	Position
Australia (Kent Music Report)	33
Belgium (Ultratop 50 Flanders)	73
UK Singles (Gallup)	68
US Billboard Hot 100	79
US Cash Box Top 100	93
West Germany (GfK)	74

1985 year-end chart performance for "Holiday"
Chart (1985)	Peak position
Netherlands (Single Top 100)	70
UK Singles (Gallup)	55

== Certifications and sales ==
Certifications and sales for "Holiday"
Region	Certification	Certified units/sales
New Zealand (RMNZ)	Gold	15,000^{‡}
South Africa (RISA)	Gold	10,000^{*}
United Kingdom (BPI)	Platinum	718,000
United States Digital downloads	—	260,000
Summaries
Europe 1985 sales	—	1,500,000
^{*} Sales figures based on certification alone.^{‡} Sales+streaming figures based on certification alone.

== Literary sources ==
- Bego, Mark (2000). Madonna: Blonde Ambition. Cooper Square Press. ISBN 978-0-8154-1051-5.
- Clerk, Carol (2012). Madonnastyle. Omnibus Press. ISBN 978-2-909828-89-3.
- Cross, Mary (2007). Madonna: A Biography. Greenwood Publishing Group. ISBN 978-0-313-33811-3.
- Easlea, Daryl (2012). Madonna: Blond Ambition. Backbeat Books. ISBN 978-1-61713-034-2.
- Fouz-Hernández, Santiago; Jarman-Ivens, Freya (2004). Madonna's Drowned Worlds. Ashgate Publishing, Ltd. ISBN 978-0-7546-3371-6.
- Gabriel, Mary (2023). Madonna: A Rebel Life. Hachette UK. ISBN 978-0-316-45644-9.
- Katz, Mike; Kott, Crispin (2018). Rock and Roll Explorer Guide to New York City. Globe Pequot Press. ISBN 978-1-4930-3704-9.
- Matthew-Walker, Robert (1991). Madonna: The Biography. Sidgwick & Jackson. ISBN 978-0-330-31482-4.
- Morton, Andrew (2001). Madonna. Macmillan Publishers. ISBN 978-0-312-98310-9.
- O'Brien, Lucy (2007). Madonna: Like an Icon. Bantam Press. ISBN 978-0-06-089896-0.
- Pollock, Bruce (2005). Rock Song Index: The 7500 Most Important Songs for the Rock & Roll Era. Routledge. ISBN 978-0-415-97073-0.
- Rettenmund, Matthew (1995). Encyclopedia Madonnica. St. Martin's Press. ISBN 978-0-312-11782-5.
- Rooksby, Rikky (2004). The Complete Guide to the Music of Madonna. Omnibus Press. ISBN 978-0-7119-9883-4.
- Sexton, Adam (1992). Desperately Seeking Madonna: In Search of the Meaning of the World's Most Famous Woman. Random Penguin. ISBN 978-0-307-48374-4.
- Sullivan, Caroline (2014). Madonna: Her Story. Seven Oaks Publishing. ISBN 978-1-78177-179-2.
- Taraborrelli, Randy J. (2001). Madonna: An Intimate Biography. Simon & Schuster. ISBN 978-0-283-07289-5.
- Wade, Ian (2024). 1984: The Year Pop Went Queer. Bonnier Books UK. ISBN 978-1-78512-082-4.
