= Lorne Cousin =

Los Angeles-based bagpipe player

Lorne Cousin is a Los Angeles–based Great Highland bagpipe player, known as the "Scottish Piper to the Stars". Cousin has performed with artists such as Madonna, Missy Elliott, Stella McCartney, Brian Cox and appears on the track 'Hotel Caledonia' by Gaudi . Lorne Cousin and his group of kilt-wearing bagpipe players were the only male-led group to perform on the main stage at the 2007 Los Angeles Women's Music Festival.
