= Martin Burgoyne =

British artist (1963–1986)

Martin Burgoyne (c. 1963 – 30 November 1986) was a British and American artist. Burgoyne was part of the downtown New York art scene in the 1980s. He befriended singer Madonna before she was famous and he was a key figure in her early career. He managed her first club tour and designed the cover for her 1983 single "Burning Up".

== Life and career ==
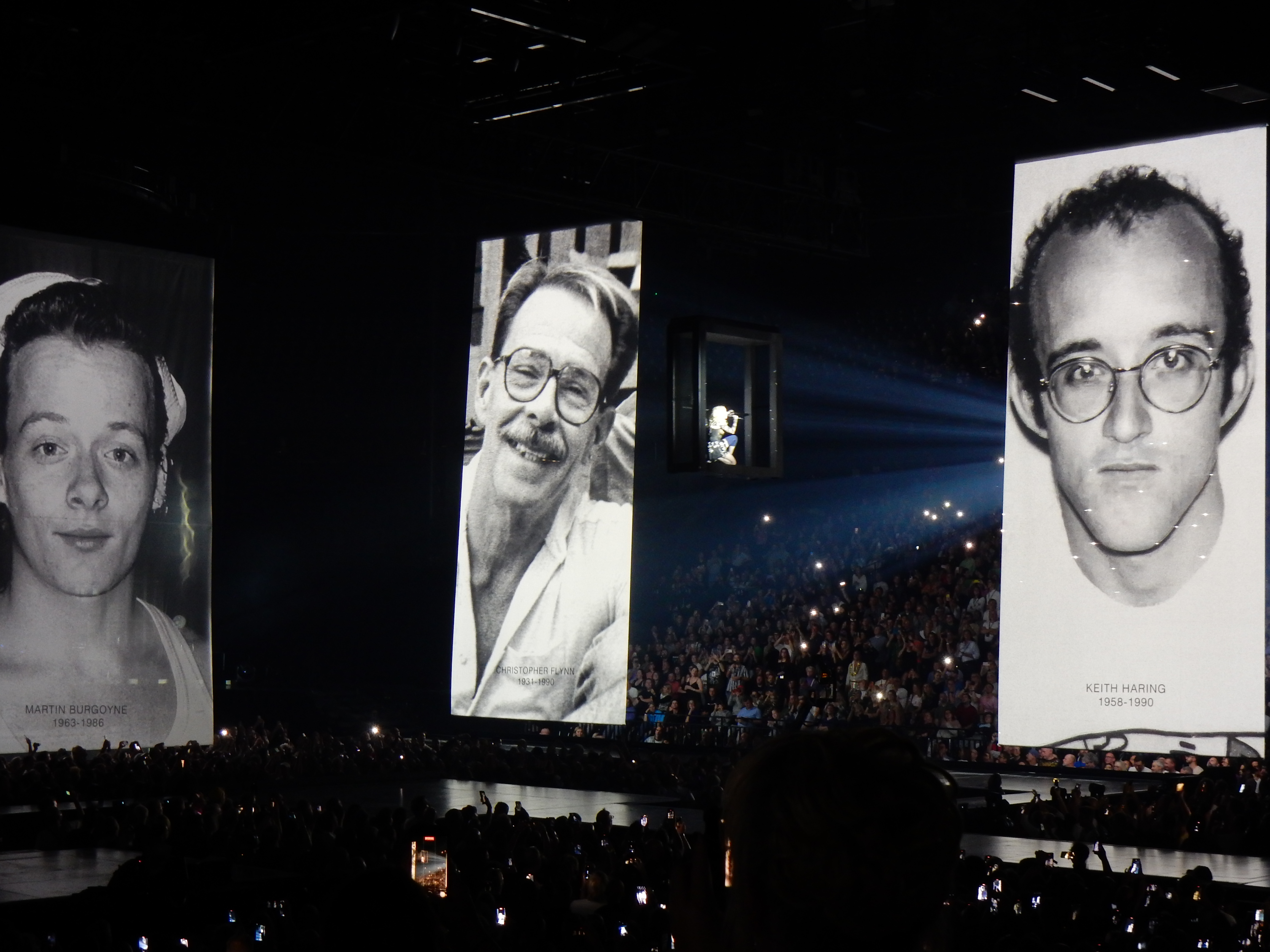
Martin Burgoyne (left), Christopher Flynn (center), and Keith Haring (right), depicted in a tribute to victims of HIV at Madonna's Celebration Tour in 2023

Born and adopted in England, Burgoyne's family moved to the United States during his childhood. He attended Seminole High School in Seminole, Florida. In 1980, he won a Scholastic Art Award scholarship for his "photorealistic graphite portrait" portfolio, which was displayed at Tyrone Square Mall in St. Petersburg, Florida.

Drawn to the excitement of New York City, Burgoyne moved to Manhattan to study art at the Pratt Institute in the early 1980s. Upon arriving, Steve Rubell, co-owner of Studio 54, hired him as a bartender. He was later a bartender at Erika Belle's Lucky Strike on East 9th Street and Third Avenue in Downtown Manhattan.

Burgoyne met and befriended up-and-coming singer Madonna and the two became roommates. Burgoyne was one of Madonna's early dancers following the release of her single "Everybody" on Sire Records in October 1982. Since Burgoyne was not a professional dancer, he was dropped from the troupe, but he was the road manager for her first club tour. Burgoyne also designed the cover sleeve for her 1983 single "Burning Up". He worked with Liz Rosenberg, a public relations executive with Sire's parent label Warner Bros. Records, to design covers for various artists.

Burgoyne designed the original cover for Madonna's debut album, which was slated to be titled Lucky Star but ended up being self-titled. According to Seymour Stein, co-founder of Sire Records and vice president of Warner Bros. Records, Madonna discreetly asked A&R executive Michael Rosenblatt to decline Burgoyne's sleeve design for her album because "it just wasn't iconic enough." However, they maintained a close relationship and shared a circle of friends, which included artists Andy Warhol, Keith Haring, and Jean-Michel Basquiat. Burgoyne invited Warhol to be his date to Madonna's wedding in August 1985.

In the summer of 1986, Burgoyne became ill with what was thought to be measles. In August 1986, he was diagnosed with AIDS-related complex (ARC). In September 1986, a fundraising party was organized by Deb Parker at the Pyramid Club in the East Village. The event raised $6,000 for Burgoyne's medical and living expenses. Among the guests were Andy Warhol, who did two drawings of Burgoyne for the invitations, Keith Haring, who designed the inside of the invitation, Kenny Scharf, who performed at the event, Anita Sarko, Steve Rubell, and Madonna. The New York Times wrote an article covering the event as the AIDS epidemic was devastating a generation of predominantly gay men. Madonna paid for Burgoyne's medical expenses at St. Vincent's Hospital. She also leased an apartment for him on West 12th Street in Greenwich Village, so that he could be closer to the hospital. In an interview for Vanity Fair in November 1986, Burgoyne told journalist Michael Shnayerson, "I'm in constant pain. I figure I'll either get better—or I won't." On 10 November, Madonna modelled a denim jacket painted by Burgoyne at an AIDS benefit fashion show for St. Vincent's Hospital.

Burgoyne died of AIDS-related complications on 30 November 1986. He was 23 years old.

== Legacy ==
During Madonna's Who's That Girl World Tour in July 1987, she held a benefit concert at Madison Square Garden for AIDS Research (AmfAR) and dedicated her performance of "Live to Tell" to Burgoyne. He is the subject of the song "In This Life", released on her album Erotica (1992). Burgoyne further inspired the song, "This Used to Be My Playground", which served as the theme to the 1992 motion picture A League of Their Own. Madonna frequently discusses and honors him at AIDS and LGBT-related benefits.

During her Celebration Tour (2023–2024) performance of "Live to Tell", a giant photo of Burgoyne was shown to the audience, along with other victims of AIDS.

In 2026, Madonna released the album Confessions II, which features the track "Danceteria". The song serves as a nostalgic tribute to the club, explicitly naming Burgoyne alongside other key figures from their early New York scene, such as Debi Mazar and Mark Kamins. He is portrayed by Daniele Sibilli in the film Confessions II.

== Credits ==
- 1983: Madonna – "Burning Up" / "Physical Attraction" (Sire Records) – Cover art
- 1983: NV – "It's Alright" (Sire Records) – Art concept
- 1984: NV – "Let Me Do You" (Sire Records) – Art concept
- 1984: Jellybean – Wotupski!?! (EMI America Records) – Design
- 1984: Jellybean – "The Mexican" (EMI America Records) – Design
- 1986: General Public – Hand To Mouth (I.R.S. Records) – Cover art
- 1986: The Jamaica Girls – "On The Move" (Sire Records) – Cover art, Design
