= Spit (nightclub) =

Coordinates: 40°43′32″N 73°31′34″W

Spit (alternately known as Uncle Sam's) was a nightclub and music venue located at Hempstead Turnpike in Levittown, New York.

== Description ==
The club opened in 1978 and closed in 1992. Some well-known artists performed at the club including Madonna, Kansas, Blue Öyster Cult, Steve Vai, Fishbone, Mr. Bungle, and Tiny Tim. Duran Duran played their first ever North American gig at Spit on September 16, 1981. Some performances were broadcast on WLIR radio. The building was set on fire in 1994 by the owners in attempt to collect insurance. They were charged and convicted of arson.
