= List of number-one albums of 2007 (Spain) =

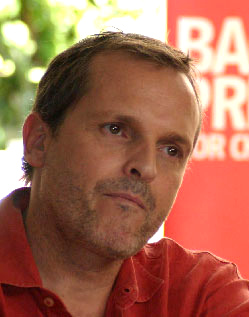
Spanish singer Miguel Bosé stayed at number one for 18 non-consecutive weeks between March 2007 and February 2008 with his duet album Papito, also the best-selling album of 2007 in Spain.

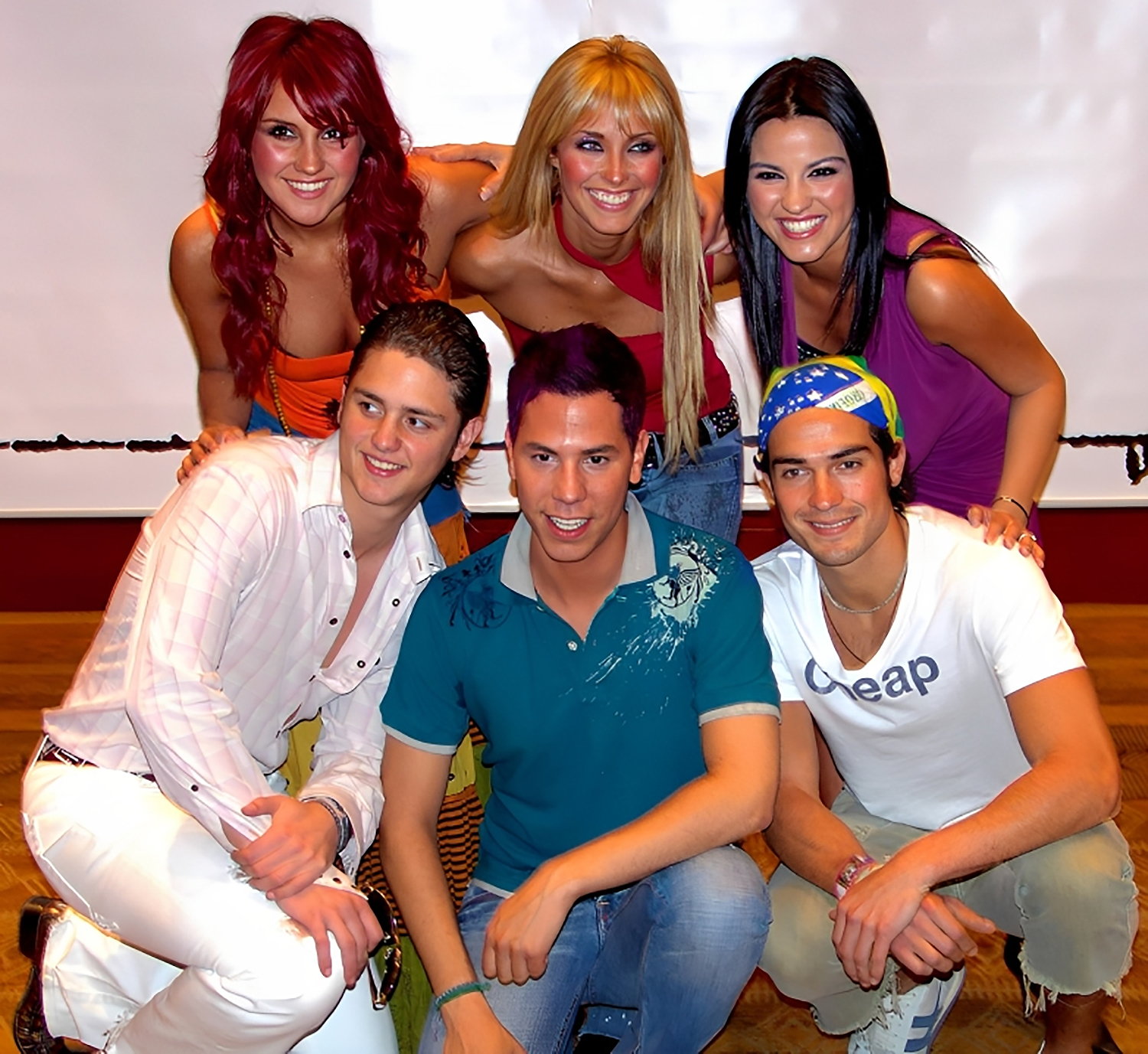
Mexican band RBD reached number one with Rebels, their first album in English.

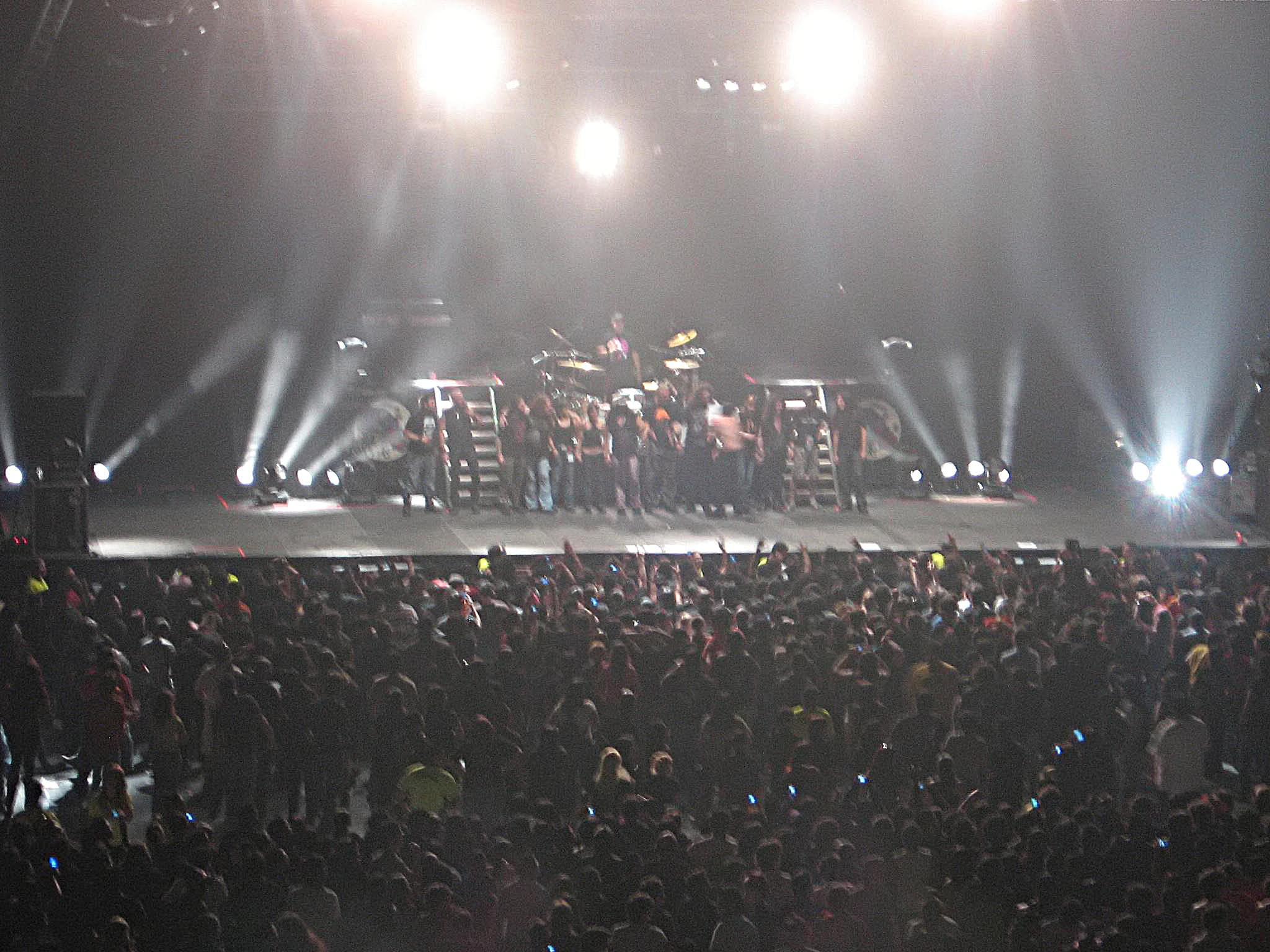
Spanish folk-metal band Mägo de Oz peaked at number one with their ninth studio album La Ciudad de los Árboles.

Top 100 España is a record chart published weekly by PROMUSICAE (Productores de Música de España), a non-profit organization composed by Spain and multinational record companies. This association tracks record sales (physical and digital) in Spain.

== Albums ==
Chart date	Album	Artist	Reference
January 7	Siempre	Il Divo	
January 14	Siempre	Il Divo	
January 21	Siempre	Il Divo	
January 28	Siempre	Il Divo	
February 4	The Confessions Tour	Madonna	
February 11	Recordando	Shaila Dúrcal	
February 18	Siempre	Il Divo	
February 25	Recordando	Shaila Dúrcal	
March 4	Ganas de Vivir	Andy & Lucas	
March 11	Ganas de Vivir	Andy & Lucas	
March 18	Ganas de Vivir	Andy & Lucas	
March 25	Papito	Miguel Bosé	
April 1	Papito	Miguel Bosé	
April 8	Papito	Miguel Bosé	
April 15	Papito	Miguel Bosé	
April 22	Papito	Miguel Bosé	
April 29	Las Aceras Están Llenas de Piojos	Marea	
May 6	Papito	Miguel Bosé	
May 13	Papito	Miguel Bosé	
May 20	Papito	Miguel Bosé	
May 27	Papito	Miguel Bosé	
June 3	Una de Dos	Kiko & Shara	
June 10	Papito	Miguel Bosé	
June 17	Papito	Miguel Bosé	
June 24	Papito	Miguel Bosé	
July 1	Rebels	RBD	
July 8	Rebels	RBD	
July 15	Papito	Miguel Bosé	
July 22	Dame tu Mano, el Baile del Verano	Los Lunnis	
July 29	Dame tu Mano, el Baile del Verano	Los Lunnis	
August 5	Dame tu Mano, el Baile del Verano	Los Lunnis	
August 12	Dame tu Mano, el Baile del Verano	Los Lunnis	
August 19	Dame tu Mano, el Baile del Verano	Los Lunnis	
August 26	Papito	Miguel Bosé	
September 2	Aproximaciones	Pereza	
September 9	La Radiolina	Manu Chao	
September 16	Sueños de un Hombre Despierto	Ismael Serrano	
September 23	10	Hombres G	
September 30	Pavarotti Forever	Luciano Pavarotti	
October 7	Magic	Bruce Springsteen	
October 14	Magic	Bruce Springsteen	
October 21	Magic	Bruce Springsteen	
October 28	La Voz de mi Silencio	El Barrio	
November 4	La Vida... Es un Ratico	Juanes	
November 11	La Ciudad de los Árboles	Mägo de Oz	
November 18	Al Filo de la Irrealidad	David Bustamante	
November 25	Al Filo de la Irrealidad	David Bustamante	
December 2	La Vida... Es un Ratico	Juanes	
December 9	Dos Pájaros de un Tiro	Serrat & Sabina	
December 16	Dos Pájaros de un Tiro	Serrat & Sabina	
December 23	Dos Pájaros de un Tiro	Serrat & Sabina	
December 30	Dos Pájaros de un Tiro	Serrat & Sabina	

== See also ==
- List of number-one singles of 2007 (Spain)
