= I'm Going to Tell You a Secret (album) =

2006 live soundtrack album by Madonna

Live album / video by Madonna
- Released: June 20, 2006
- Recorded: September 4–5, 2004
- Venues: Palais Omnisports de Paris-Bercy (Paris, France)
- Genres: Dance; electronica; pop
- Length: 65:59 (album); 127:35 (video)
- Labels: Warner Bros.; Warner Music Vision
- Producers: Madonna; Stuart Price

Madonna chronology
Confessions on a Dance Floor (2005)	I'm Going to Tell You a Secret (2006)	The Confessions Tour (2007)

Madonna video chronology
Drowned World Tour 2001 (2001)	I'm Going to Tell You a Secret (2006)	The Confessions Tour (2007)

I'm Going to Tell You a Secret is the first live album by American singer and songwriter Madonna, containing songs from the documentary of same name. The film chronicled the behind-the-scenes of Madonna's Re-Invention World Tour (2004), and was directed by Jonas Åkerlund. The album was released on June 20, 2006, in a two-disc format, a CD with 13 songs from the show plus a demo from her tenth studio album Confessions on a Dance Floor (2005), and a DVD with the documentary film. The documentary and the album were also released as digital download to the iTunes Store.

The live CD consisted of two pre-recorded tracks, "The Beast Within" and "Hollywood" while extras on the DVD included 12 deleted scenes from the documentary. The release received positive response from critics and was nominated for a Grammy Award at the 2007 show in the category of Best Long Form Music Video. It peaked within the top-ten of the album charts in Belgium, Canada, France, Germany, Italy and Switzerland, while the DVD topped the video charts in markets such as Australia, Italy, Spain and the United States.

== Background and release ==
The Re-Invention World Tour was the sixth concert tour by Madonna. It supported her ninth studio album American Life, and visited North America and Europe. Madonna was inspired to create the tour, after taking part in an art installation called X-STaTIC PRo=CeSS, directed by photographer Steven Klein. She incorporated the images from the installation in the tour, whose name was in reality a dig at Madonna's critics. A number of songs were rehearsed for the tour, with twenty-four of them making the final setlist. It received positive reviews from critics. and was chronicled in the documentary titled I'm Going to Tell You a Secret. Originally called The Re-Invented Process, the documentary was filmed during Madonna's visit to North America and Europe from May 24–September 14, 2004, and was directed by Jonas Åkerlund. Critical response towards the documentary was mixed, with one group of reviewers complimenting the live performances from the tour and the scenes involving her children and family, while others criticized the self-indulgent nature of the documentary and the preaching nature of Madonna's commentary in the film.

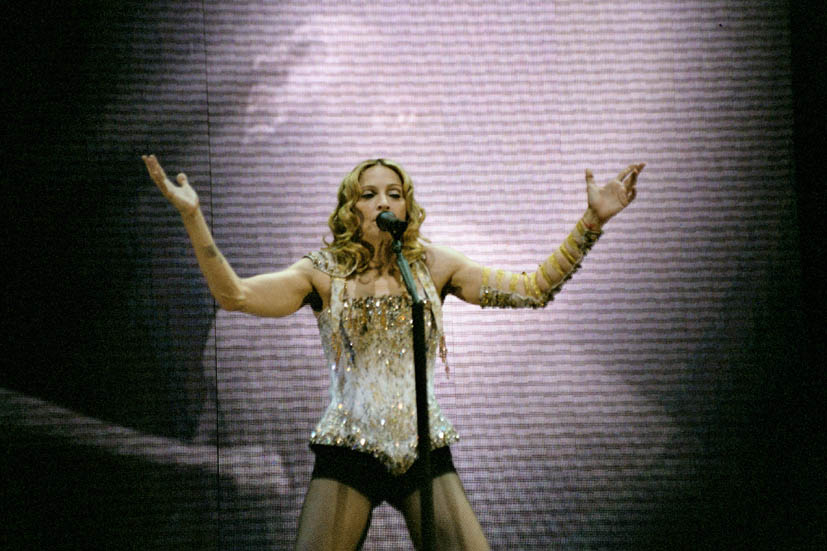
Madonna performing "Frozen" on the Re-Invention World Tour. A picture of the performance was used as cover-art.

I'm Going to Tell You a Secret the album was released on June 20, 2006, in a two-disc format, a CD with 14 songs from the show and a DVD with the documentary film. The album includes the original demo version of "I Love New York", a track later found on her 2005 album Confessions on a Dance Floor in a dance form. The track was originally recorded as a rock song before being re-recorded. The documentary and the album was also released as digital download to the iTunes Store. Originally, Warner Bros. announced that the "American Life" director's cut music video would be included as an extra with the documentary, with the press release also including this information. The music video was not included and no reason was given for the omission.

The DVD was shot in an aspect ratio of 1.78:1 on a single sided, double layered disc, with the image being enhanced for 16×9 televisions. The black-and-white visuals had mixed a lot of visual styles according to Jacobson, and had grains and erratic focus. The non-concert color sequences followed the same style, but the performance sequences were in high definition. Backgrounds were dark and Jacobson noted that the color black appeared taut and full, while the few low-light bits came across well. The 5.1 surround sound was mostly utilized during the live performance sequences. The live CD includes two pre-recorded tracks, "The Beast Within" and "Hollywood". There are 12 deleted scenes, spanning a total of 15 minutes and 38 seconds; scenes include Madonna on a bike, working with vocal coach Joan Leder, affinity for French and comical sequences featuring Price and musician Steve Sidelnyk. The cover was a shot of Madonna from her performance of "Frozen" on the show, and the packaging included a 20-page booklet.

== Critical reception ==
Professional ratings
Review scores
Source	Rating
AllMusic	3/5 stars
The Buffalo News	3/4 stars
Canoe.ca	4/5 stars
Common Sense Media	4/5 stars
Gaffa	5/6 stars
Jam!	3/5 stars
Pitchfork	3.3/10
Rolling Stone	3/4 stars
St. Louis Post-Dispatch	C+
Tom Hull – on the Web	A−

Stephen Thomas Erlewine from AllMusic felt that the reworking of Madonna's older hits like "Into the Groove" and "Holiday" gave them a campy, Eurotrash feel like the songs on Confessions on a Dance Floor; he added that "[the reworkings] help give the disc a cohesive feel even if the live performance, like the album it's hawking, is kind of humorless. That said, as Madonna's first live CD, I'm Going to Tell You a Secret is strong and entertaining, and even if the excessive minutiae on the accompanying DVD means only hardcore fans will sit through its two hours, it's also quite well done." George Palathingal of Sydney Morning Herald, commented that "the accompanying live CD isn't so good without the visuals". Chuck Campbell from Quad-City Times described the release as an "impressive live CD/DVD combo".

Sterdan from Jam! complimented the CD section of the release, saying that "Thankfully, the CD takes up the slack, delivering more than an hour of newer fare like 'American Life' and 'Music', peppered with oldies like 'Vogue', 'Holiday' and 'Like a Prayer'. Next time Madonna wants to share a secret, she should just leave the cameras at home." Conversely, Sébastien Chicoine from Canoe.ca website preferred the DVD over the CD, saying that the disc was not "absolutely necessary" but could understand the business logic behind adding the CD to the release.

Barry Walters from Rolling Stone said that the live CD proved that Madonna is a better singer. A reviewer from The Buffalo News was impressed with the release, saying that "This is exactly what you'd expect it to be – a live document of Madonna's most recent tour, which means, essentially, a tour through the dance-based pop music of the past 20 years." Colin Jacobson from the DVD Movie Guide website explained that "though parts of I'm Going to Tell You a Secret frustrate, it remains a reasonably entertaining program. It probably will be most interesting for Madonna's most serious fans, though. Those in search of the broader titillation of Truth or Dare will leave disappointed." He added that most of the shots in the DVD seemed accurate, time-and-again a softness crept up in the wide angle shots. Jacobson found the performance s shots to be compelling and gave the sound of the DVD a rating of B+. The album was nominated for a Grammy Award at the 49th ceremony in the category Best Long Form Music Video.

== Commercial performance ==
In the United States, the release debuted at number 33 on the Billboard 200 with 25,000 copies sold in its first week. It also debuted at number three on the Top Soundtracks chart, number 13 on the Top Internet Albums chart and debuted atop the Top Music Videos chart. The next week, the album slipped down to number 107 on the Billboard 200, while holding atop the Top Music Videos chart. According to Nielsen SoundScan, the album has sold 85,000 copies in the US as of August 2010. In Canada, the album debuted and peaked at number four on the Canadian Albums Chart.

The CD/DVD version of I'm Going to Tell You a Secret was eligible to chart on both albums and DVD charts. However, in some countries, both versions were combined and appeared on just one chart, as in Australia, where all versions counted towards the DVD chart and the release was ineligible for the albums chart. On the Australian DVD Chart, the album debuted at the top of the chart for the issue dated June 26, 2006, and was certified platinum by the Australian Recording Industry Association (ARIA) for shipment of 15,000 copies of the release.

In the United Kingdom, I'm Going to Tell You a Secret debuted at number 18 on the UK Albums Chart, with first week sales of 14,449 copies. It was Madonna's 17th release to chart there, all previous releases having achieved top-five placement on the album chart. The release was certified gold by the British Phonographic Industry (BPI) for shipment of 25,000 copies. In France, the release entered the French Albums Chart at its peak position of number eight. After three months, it was certified gold by the Syndicat National de l'Édition Phonographique (SNEP) for shipment of 75,000 copies of the album. The CD+DVD also reached a peak of eight on the German Albums Chart and has been certified gold by the Bundesverband Musikindustrie (BVMI) for more than 25,000 units shipped. Across Europe the album reached the top-ten in Belgium, Denmark, Hungary, Portugal, and Switzerland. On the Pan-European Top 100 Albums chart, it reached a peak of number five, and also reached the top of the chart in Italy.

== Track listing ==
CD
No.	Title	Writer(s)	Length
1.	"The Beast Within"	Lenny Kravitz; Ingrid Chavez; Additional lyrics by Madonna	5:04
2.	"Vogue"	Madonna; Shep Pettibone	5:31
3.	"Nobody Knows Me"	Madonna; Mirwais Ahmadzaï	4:04
4.	"American Life"	Madonna; Ahmadzaï	5:21
5.	"Hollywood" (remix)	Madonna; Ahmadzaï	3:59
6.	"Die Another Day"	Madonna; Ahmadzaï	4:03
7.	"Lament"	Andrew Lloyd Webber; Tim Rice	2:27
8.	"Like a Prayer"	Madonna; Patrick Leonard	5:22
9.	"Mother and Father"	Madonna; Ahmadzaï	5:21
10.	"Imagine"	John Lennon	3:51
11.	"Susan MacLeod"/"Into the Groove"	Donald MacLeod / Madonna; Stephen Bray	7:19
12.	"Music"	Madonna; Ahmadzaï	4:54
13.	"Holiday"	Curtis Hudson; Lisa Stevens	5:44
14.	"I Love New York" (demo version)	Madonna	2:52

DVD: Main Program
No.	Title	Length
1.	"Intro"	2:45
2.	"Los Angeles"	19:12
3.	"New York"	13:25
4.	"Chicago"	7:28
5.	"Las Vegas"	6:26
6.	"Miami"	6:49
7.	"London"	11:53
8.	"Dublin"	8:32
9.	"Paris"	9:42
10.	"Lisbon"	10:20
11.	"Israel"	15:06
12.	"Credits"	4:31
Total length:		126:19

DVD: Bonus Features
No.	Title	Length
1.	"The Bike Ride"	1:17
2.	"The Other Side"	0:59
3.	"Steve/Stuart in L.A."	1:41
4.	"Vocal Coach"	1:17
5.	"Chaos"	0:59
6.	"Birthday Party"	2:01
7.	"French Trilogy"	1:15
8.	"Steve/Stuart in Paris"	1:19
9.	"Monte's Guitar Faces"	2:13
10.	"Fans Singing in Paris"	0:49
11.	"After Show"	1:18
12.	"Wailing Wall"	0:35
Total length:		15:43

=== Formats ===
- CD/DVD – double disc digipak edition containing the live DVD and the live CD
- DVD – DVD keep case packed with the DVD and the live CD
- iTunes Digital download – The full 2-hour documentary in digital version

== Personnel ==
Credits adapted from I'm Going to Tell You a Secret information from AllMusic.

- Jonas Åkerlund – director, editing
- Mary Susan Applegate – audio production
- Susan Applegate – producer
- Angela Becker – audio production, producer
- Erik Broms – photography director
- Marcus Brown – keyboards
- Donna De Lory – background vocals
- Randy Ezratty – consultant
- Keeley Gould – producer
- Shelli Jury – audio production
- Shelli Jury – producer
- Frank Maddocks – creative director, package design
- Madonna – vocals, executive producer
- Mike McKnight – keyboard programming, keyboards
- Guy Oseary – photography
- Casey Phariss – recording technician
- Monte Pittman – guitar
- Bill Pohlad – executive producer
- Iggy Pop – main personnel
- Stuart Price – mixing
- Steve Sidelnyk – drums
- Joel Singer – engineer
- Nick Spanos – photography

== Charts ==
=== Weekly charts ===
Weekly album chart peaks of I'm Going to Tell You a Secret
Chart (2006)	Peak position
Austrian Albums (Ö3 Austria)	12
Belgian Albums (Ultratop Flanders)	5
Belgian Albums (Ultratop Wallonia)	10
Canadian Albums (Billboard)	4
Croatian International Albums (HDU)	3
Czech Albums (ČNS IFPI)	39
Danish Albums (Hitlisten)	7
Dutch Albums (Album Top 100)	4
Europe (European Top 100 Albums)	5
French Albums (SNEP)	8
German Albums (Offizielle Top 100)	8
Greek Albums (IFPI Greece)	2
Hungarian Albums (MAHASZ)	9
Irish Albums (IRMA)	40
Italian Albums (FIMI)	1
Japanese Albums (Oricon)	12
Mexican Albums (Top 100 Mexico)	3
Polish Albums (ZPAV)	34
Portuguese Albums (AFP)	5
Scottish Albums (Official Charts)	23
Swiss Albums (Schweizer Hitparade)	7
UK Albums (Official Charts)	18
US Billboard 200	33
US Soundtrack Albums (Billboard)	3

2009 weekly album chart peaks of I'm Going to Tell You a Secret
Chart (2009)	Peak position
Croatian Albums (HDU)	33

=== Monthly charts ===
Monthly album chart peaks of I'm Going to Tell You a Secret
Chart (2006)	Peak position
Japanese International Albums (Oricon)	14
Uruguayan International Albums (CUD)	8

=== Year-end album charts ===
2006 year-end album chart positions of I'm Going to Tell You a Secret
Chart (2006)	Position
Dutch Albums (Album Top 100)	88
Italian Albums (Musica e dischi)	45
Mexican Albums (Top 100 Mexico)	59
Mexican English Albums (Top 100 Mexico)	16

Weekly video chart peaks of I'm Going to Tell You a Secret
Chart (2006)	Peak position
Australian Music DVD (ARIA)	1
Belgian Music DVD (Ultratop Flanders)	4
Belgian Music DVD (Ultratop Wallonia)	2
Czech Music DVD (ČNS IFPI)	1
Dutch Music DVD (MegaCharts)	2
Finnish Music DVD (Suomen virallinen lista)	2
Greek Music DVD (IFPI Greece)	2
Hungarian Music DVD (MAHASZ)	1
Italian Music DVD (FIMI)	1
New Zealand Music DVD (RIANZ)	8
Norwegian Music DVD (VG-lista)	1
Spanish Music DVD (Promusicae)	1
Swedish Music DVD (Sverigetopplistan)	1
UK Music Videos (Official Charts)	1
US Music Video Sales (Billboard)	1

=== Year-end DVD charts ===
2006 year-end video chart positions of I'm Going to Tell You a Secret
Chart (2006)	Position
Argentine Music DVD (CAPIF)	6
Australian Music DVD (ARIA)	32
Belgian Music DVD (Ultratop Flanders)	46
Belgian Music DVD (Ultratop Wallonia)	43
Dutch Music DVD (MegaCharts)	24
French Music DVD (SNEP/IFOP)	25
Greek Music DVD (IFPI Greece)	12
Italian Music DVD (Musica e dischi)	8
Spanish Music DVD (PROMUSICAE)	9
Swedish Music DVD (Sverigetopplistan)	14

2007 year-end video chart positions of I'm Going to Tell You a Secret
Chart (2007)	Position
Swedish Music DVD (Sverigetopplistan)	96

2008 year-end video chart positions of I'm Going to Tell You a Secret
Chart (2008)	Position
Swedish Music DVD (Sverigetopplistan)	46

== Certifications and sales ==
Certifications and sales for I'm Going to Tell You a Secret
Region	Certification	Certified units/sales
Album
France (SNEP)	Gold	100,000^{*}
Italy	—	100,000
United Kingdom	—	39,000
United States	—	85,000
DVD
Argentina (CAPIF)	Platinum	8,000^{^}
Australia (ARIA)	Platinum	15,000^{^}
Brazil (Pro-Música Brasil)	Gold	15,000^{*}
Germany (BVMI)	Gold	25,000^{^}
Spain (Promusicae)	Platinum	25,000^{^}
United Kingdom (BPI)	Gold	25,000^{^}
^{*} Sales figures based on certification alone.^{^} Shipments figures based on certification alone.

== See also ==
- List of number-one hits of 2006 (Italy)

== Bibliography ==
- O'Brien, Lucy (2008). Madonna: Like an Icon. Bantam Press. ISBN 978-0-552-15361-4.
- Timmerman, Dirk (2007). Madonna Live! Secret Re-inventions and Confessions on Tour. Maklu Publications Inc. ISBN 978-9-085-95002-8.
