= Lucrezia (singer) =

- Born: Milan, Italy
- Genres: Pop
- Occupation: Singer
- Labels: Logic Records

Lucrezia is a singer from Italy, born in Milan. She is best known for her 2001 cover of Madonna's 1986 hit "Live to Tell", which reached No.2 on Billboard's Hot Dance Music/Club Play chart. While Madonna's version was more of a haunting ballad, Lucrezia's cover is much more uptempo. This cover received considerable airplay in dance clubs and on MTV.

== Discography ==
- 2000: "Lookin 4 Love"
- 2001: "Live to Tell"
- 2003: "Follow Your Heart"
