= The Confessions Tour (album) =

2007 live album by Madonna

Live album / video by Madonna
- Released: January 26, 2007
- Recorded: August 15–16, 2006
- Venues: Wembley Arena (London, England)
- Length: 73:14 (CD); 122:38 (DVD)
- Labels: Warner Bros.; Warner Music Vision
- Director: Jonas Åkerlund
- Producers: Madonna; Stuart Price

Madonna chronology
| I'm Going to Tell You a Secret (2006) | The Confessions Tour (2007) | Hard Candy (2008) |

Madonna video chronology
| I'm Going to Tell You a Secret (2006) | The Confessions Tour (2007) | Celebration: The Video Collection (2009) |

Singles from The Confessions Tour
- 1. "Future Lovers / I Feel Love" Released: January 26, 2007; 2. "Music Inferno" Released: January 26, 2007

The Confessions Tour is the second live album by American singer and songwriter Madonna. It was released on January 26, 2007, by Warner Bros. Records. Directed by Jonas Åkerlund, the album chronicles Madonna's 2006 Confessions Tour and includes the full version of the television broadcast special The Confessions Tour: Live from London. It was recorded at Wembley Arena during the London dates of the tour, and was released in both CD and DVD format. The DVD contains the entire concert and the CD includes thirteen live songs only. The album became the first release from Semtex Films, a production company founded by Madonna in 2006.

The Confessions Tour received generally positive reviews from contemporary critics and won the Best Long Form Music Video category at the 50th Grammy Awards. The album reached number one on the official charts in Belgium (Wallonia), Czech Republic, Hungary, Greece, Italy, Mexico, Portugal and Spain and the top-five in most musical markets. It received moderate success in her native country, peaking at number fifteen on the U.S. Billboard 200 albums chart. The DVD reached the top of the video charts in most of the countries it charted, including Australia, Italy, Spain and the United States. Commercially, The Confessions Tour has sold more than 1 million copies worldwide.

For the 2026 edition of Record Store Day on April 18, 2026, The Confessions Tour was released for the first time ever on a pink and purple vinyl, including 13 live tracks from the original album.

== Background ==
Following the 2006 live release I'm Going to Tell You a Secret, Madonna released her second live album, The Confessions Tour. The album was recorded at Wembley Arena on August 15 and 16, 2006, during the London stop of her 2006 Confessions Tour, which was promoting her 2005 studio album Confessions on a Dance Floor. It was the first release from her new production company, Semtex Films and was released in both DVD and CD formats, capturing the tour as directed by Jonas Åkerlund. The DVD release consists of the full twenty-one song set list of the tour, while the CD captures thirteen highlights from the same. The tour was first shown on NBC during the Thanksgiving of 2006. This broadcast was edited, cutting the likes of "Paradise (Not For Me)" and heavily editing the performance of "Live to Tell". Madonna's performance of the latter, while hanging from a glass embellished crucifix and wearing a crown made of thorns on her head, faced strong reaction from the media and religious groups. Asian media and services company Fridae reported that the album was banned in Singapore, Malaysia and parts of East Asia, because of the inclusion of the performances in the DVD.

== Critical reception ==
Professional ratings
Review scores
| Source | Rating |
|---|---|
| About.com | 3.5/5 stars |
| AllMusic | 2.5/5 stars |
| BBC Music | B |
| Entertainment Weekly | B+ |
| Gaffa | 5/6 stars |
| Pitchfork | 4.2/10 |
| PopMatters | 5/10 |
| Slant Magazine | 3/5 stars |
| Stylus Magazine | A− |
| Tom Hull – on the Web | A− |

Stephen Thomas Erlewine from AllMusic felt that the CD version of the album was "not all that much fun to hear, even if the reinterpretations of the 20-year-old hits are interesting. The DVD doesn't feel as cold thanks entirely to the pizzazz of the visuals and the determined efficiency of the show, but even so, this is primarily of interest to the diehards who don't mind purchasing another live CD/DVD set just a year after the first." Ed Gonzalez from Slant Magazine felt that the concert finale in the album "is a reminder that Madonna's music need not be motivated by sex or politics to be good as long as it displays a smidgen of heart and soul." Thomas Inskeep from Stylus Magazine also complimented the finale of the tour. According to him, "[The Confessions Tour] is almost exclusively up-tempo, staged within an inch of its life yet more vivacious than anything she's done in years. Its CD companion is a pared-down 13 tracks taken from the live show, and good God it smokes." However, he felt that the disc loses its momentum during the "Confessions" part, which demonstrates a trio of individuals confessing about their sufferings in life.

Jody Rosen from Entertainment Weekly commented that "Madonna must be seen as well as heard, as the video portion of this CD/DVD proves". Chuck Campbell from Quad-City Times said "the CD is handy, blocking out the DVD's distracting images so fans can concentrate on the music at the heart of Madonna's success". He further describes that the CD/DVD combo "fills in the blanks left by I'm Going to Tell You a Secret".

Tom Young from BBC Music said that he did not see the actual performances on the tour and felt that "some of the magnitude of the performance is lost and the track/scene changes appear needlessly long-winded. [...] As far as live albums go, this is a job well done." Stephen M. Deusner from Pitchfork gave a negative review for the album, stating "Madonna herself is mostly to blame. On stage, she draws from a deep well of amazing pop songs and has the money and power to reinvent this sort of traveling circus. So why not try to break down the wall between performance and audience and hold a gigantic rave? [...] Åkerlund gives you everything you don't want from a concert film: incessant quick cuts that you give you no sense of space or stage, overdubbed music and vocals that give you no sense of performance, and only a few shots of the audience to gauge their excitement." Mini Anthikad-Chhibber The Hindu commented that "Madonna pulls out all stops in this effort turn the world into a dance floor and one just has to doff one's hat to her energy." At the 50th Grammy Awards held on February 10, 2008, at Staples Center in Los Angeles, The Confessions Tour won in the category of Grammy Award for Best Long Form Music Video.

== Commercial performance ==
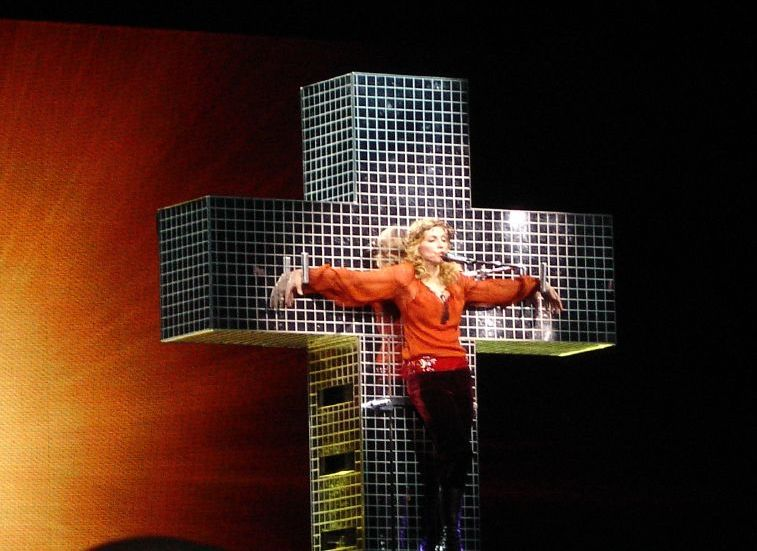
The performance of "Live to Tell" on the Confessions Tour was met with strong reaction from religious groups who deemed it anti-Christian.

The Confessions Tour has sold more than 1 million copies worldwide. In the United States, the album debuted at number 15 on the Billboard 200 chart with first week sales of 40,000 according to Nielsen SoundScan. In Canada, it debuted at number two on the Canadian Albums Chart. The same position was attained in Argentina, where was certified Gold by the Cámara Argentina de Productores de Fonogramas y Videogramas (CAPIF) for shipments of 20,000 copies. In the same country, the DVD also proved to be successful, ending as one of the best-selling records of 2008 and receiving a Platinum certification in two different formats. The album topped the charts in Mexico, and attained the number four position in Brazil.

The Confessions Tour was not able to enter the official ARIA Albums Chart, but debuted at number-one on the Australian Top 40 DVD chart, on the issue dated February 12, 2007. At the year end Australian chart for 2007, The Confessions Tour became the 27th best selling DVD in Australia. The album was certified Platinum by the Australian Recording Industry Association (ARIA), for shipment of 15,000 copies in DVD units. In New Zealand, the album entered at number 23. In Japan, the album reached a peak of number ten on the Oricon weekly albums chart and was present on the chart for twelve weeks. In Hong Kong, it was awarded a Gold Disc Award by the International Federation of the Phonographic Industry for becoming one of ten biggest-selling international album for 2007.

Across Europe The Confessions Tour reached the top of the charts in Belgium (Wallonia), Czech Republic, Italy, Portugal and Spain, while reaching the top ten of the rest of the European nations. In the United Kingdom, it debuted at number seven on the UK Albums Chart with 22,227 copies, while in Norway, the album just missed the top ten of the charts. In Czech Republic, the album remained for three weeks at the number-one position and had sold 7,582 units there, as of February 2008. In Netherlands, 35,000 copies of the album were shipped. The commercial success in Europe enabled the album to debut at position two on Billboard's European Top 100 Albums chart, behind Norah Jones' studio album Not Too Late.

== Track listing ==
| No. | Title | Writer(s) | Length |
|---|---|---|---|
| 1. | "Future Lovers" / "I Feel Love" | Madonna; Mirwais Ahmadzaï / Donna Summer; Peter Bellotte; Giorgio Moroder | 8:04 |
| 2. | "Get Together" | Madonna; Stuart Price; Anders Bagge; Peer Astrom | 5:19 |
| 3. | "Like a Virgin" | Tom Kelly; Billy Steinberg | 4:08 |
| 4. | "Jump" | Madonna; Price; Joe Henry | 4:56 |
| 5. | "Confessions" | Madonna; Patrick Leonard; Daniel "Cloud" Campos; Sofia Boutella; Leroy "Hypnosis" Barnes | 3:55 |
| 6. | "Live to Tell" | Madonna; Leonard | 5:10 |
| 7. | "Forbidden Love" | Madonna; Price | 4:24 |
| 8. | "Isaac" | Madonna; Price | 6:45 |
| 9. | "Sorry" | Madonna; Price | 5:02 |
| 10. | "Like It or Not" | Madonna; Christian Karlsson & Pontus Winnberg; Henrik Jonback | 4:51 |
| 11. | "Sorry" (remix) | Madonna; Price | 3:37 |
| 12. | "I Love New York" | Madonna; Price | 5:43 |
| 13. | "Ray of Light" | Madonna; William Orbit; Clive Muldoon; Dave Curtis; Christine Leach | 6:26 |
| 14. | "Let It Will Be" | Madonna; Ahmadzaï; Price | 7:32 |
| 15. | "Drowned World/Substitute for Love" | Madonna; Orbit; Rod McKuen; Anita Kerr; David Collins | 5:00 |
| 16. | "Paradise (Not for Me)" | Madonna; Ahmadzaï | 5:05 |
| 17. | "Music Inferno" | Madonna; Ahmadzaï / Leroy Green; Tyrone Kersey | 7:49 |
| 18. | "Erotica" | Madonna; Shep Pettibone; Anthony Shimkin | 4:47 |
| 19. | "La Isla Bonita" | Madonna; Leonard; Bruce Gaitsch | 5:02 |
| 20. | "Lucky Star" | Madonna | 4:36 |
| 21. | "Hung Up" | Madonna; Price; Benny Andersson; Björn Ulvaeus | 9:24 |
| 22. | "Credits" | | 3:31 |
| Total length: | | | 2:02:38 |

Bonus features
| No. | Title | Length |
|---|---|---|
| 1. | "Je suis l'art" | 12:20 |
| 2. | "They're Naughty Children" | 1:36 |
| 3. | "Rollerskating" | 1:40 |
| 4. | "Photo gallery" | 1:47 |
| Total length: | | 17:23 |

CD / Vinyl
| No. | Title | Writer(s) | Length |
|---|---|---|---|
| 1. | "Future Lovers" / "I Feel Love" | Madonna; Ahmadzaï / Summer; Bellotte; Moroder | 8:00 |
| 2. | "Like a Virgin" | Kelly; Steinberg | 4:13 |
| 3. | "Jump" | Madonna; Price; Henry | 4:53 |
| 4. | "Confessions" | Madonna; Leonard; Campos; Boutella; Barnes | 3:53 |
| 5. | "Isaac" | Madonna; Price | 6:45 |
| 6. | "Sorry" | Madonna; Price | 5:03 |
| 7. | "Sorry" (remix) | Madonna; Price | 3:44 |
| 8. | "I Love New York" | Madonna; Price | 5:36 |
| 9. | "Let It Will Be" | Madonna; Price; Ahmadzaï | 4:45 |
| 10. | "Music Inferno" | Madonna; Ahmadzaï / Green; Kersey | 7:41 |
| 11. | "Erotica" | Madonna; Pettibone; Shimkin | 4:55 |
| 12. | "Lucky Star" | Madonna | 3:50 |
| 13. | "Hung Up" | Madonna; Price; Andersson; Ulvaeus | 9:50 |
| Total length: | | | 1:13:14 |

iTunes edition bonus tracks
| No. | Title | Writer(s) | Length |
|---|---|---|---|
| 14. | "Get Together" | Madonna; Price; Bagge; Astrom | 5:22 |
| 15. | "Ray of Light" | Madonna; Orbit; Muldoon; Curtis; Leach | 6:12 |
| Total length: | | | 1:24:34 |

Notes

- "Music Inferno" includes "The Duck Mixes the Hits" medley video interlude.

=== Formats ===
- CD/DVD – double disc digipak edition containing the live DVD and the live CD.
- DVD – DVD keep case packed with the DVD.
- Digital download – The live film and 15 audio performances, including the bonus tracks "Ray of Light" and "Get Together."
- Vinyl – double pink and purple vinyl containing 13 live tracks.

== Personnel ==
Credits adapted from The Confessions Tour CD liner notes:

- Director – Jonas Åkerlund
- Production company – Semtex Films, Semtex TV Productions
- Producer – Sara Martin
- Executive producers – Madonna, Angela Becker, Guy Oseary and John Payne
- Photography – Eric Broms
- Film editing – Jonas Åkerlund, Philip Richardson, Johan Söderberg and Danny Tull
- Costume designer – Jean-Paul Gaultier and Arianne Phillips

== Charts ==
=== Album ===
| Chart (2007–08) | Peak Position |
|---|---|
| Argentine Albums (CAPIF) | 2 |
| Belgian Albums (Ultratop Flanders) | 3 |
| Belgian Albums (Ultratop Wallonia) | 1 |
| Brazilian Albums (ABPD) | 4 |
| Canadian Albums (Billboard) | 2 |
| Croatian International Albums (HDU) | 1 |
| Czech Albums (ČNS IFPI) | 1 |
| Danish Albums (Hitlisten) | 5 |
| Dutch Albums (Album Top 100) | 2 |
| European Top 100 Albums (Billboard) | 2 |
| Finnish Albums (Suomen virallinen lista) | 5 |
| French Albums (SNEP) | 2 |
| German Albums (Offizielle Top 100) | 2 |
| Greek Albums (IFPI Greece) | 1 |
| Hungarian Albums (MAHASZ) | 1 |
| Irish Albums (IRMA) | 10 |
| Italian Albums (FIMI) | 1 |
| Japanese Albums (Oricon) | 10 |
| Mexican Albums (Top 100 Mexico) | 1 |
| New Zealand Albums (RMNZ) | 23 |
| Norwegian Albums (VG-lista) | 15 |
| Polish Albums (ZPAV) | 5 |
| Portuguese Albums (AFP) | 1 |
| Scottish Albums (Official Charts) | 9 |
| Spanish Albums (Promusicae) | 1 |
| Swedish Albums (Sverigetopplistan) | 8 |
| Swiss Albums (Schweizer Hitparade) | 2 |
| UK Albums (Official Charts) | 7 |
| US Billboard 200 | 15 |
| US Indie Store Album Sales (Billboard) | 13 |

| Chart (2026) | Peak Position |
|---|---|
| UK Album Sales (OCC) | 9 |

=== Monthly album charts ===
| Chart (2007) | Peak position |
|---|---|
| Japanese International Albums (Oricon) | 3 |

Monthly chart performance
| Chart (2026) | Position |
|---|---|
| Croatian International Vinyl Albums (HDU) | 2 |

=== Year-end album charts ===
| Chart (2007) | Position |
|---|---|
| Belgian Albums (Ultratop Flanders) | 51 |
| Belgium (Ultratop 50 Flanders) | 32 |
| Dutch Albums (Album Top 100) | 74 |
| European Top 100 Albums (Billboard) | 28 |
| French Albums (SNEP) | 65 |
| German Albums (Offizielle Top 100) | 86 |
| Hungarian Albums (MAHASZ) | 31 |
| Hungarian Albums & Compilations (MAHASZ) | 52 |
| Italian Albums (FIMI) | 23 |
| Mexican Albums (Top 100 Mexico) | 7 |
| Mexican English Albums (Top 100 Mexico) | 1 |
| Swiss Albums (Schweizer Hitparade) | 59 |

=== DVD ===
| Chart (2007) | Peak Position |
|---|---|
| Australian Music DVD (ARIA) | 1 |
| Austrian Music DVD (Ö3 Austria) | 1 |
| Belgian Music DVD (Ultratop Flanders) | 2 |
| Belgian Music DVD (Ultratop Wallonia) | 1 |
| Czech Music DVD (ČNS IFPI) | 1 |
| Danish Music DVD (Hitlisten) | 5 |
| Dutch Music DVD (MegaCharts) | 1 |
| Finnish Music DVD (Suomen virallinen lista) | 3 |
| Greek Music DVD (IFPI Greece) | 3 |
| Hungarian Music DVD (MAHASZ) | 1 |
| Italian Music DVD (FIMI) | 1 |
| New Zealand Music DVD (RMNZ) | 4 |
| Portuguese Music DVD (AFP) | 1 |
| Spanish Music DVD (Promusicae) | 1 |
| Swedish Music DVD (Sverigetopplistan) | 1 |
| Swiss Music DVD (Schweizer Hitparade) | 1 |
| US Music Video Sales (Billboard) | 1 |

=== Monthly DVD charts ===
| Chart (2007) | Peak Position |
|---|---|
| Argentine Music DVD (CAPIF) Double package | 11 |

| Chart (2008) | Peak Position |
|---|---|
| Argentine Music DVD (CAPIF) | 1 |

=== Year-end DVD charts ===
| Chart (2007) | Position |
|---|---|
| Australian Music DVD (ARIA) | 27 |
| Austrian Music DVD (Ö3 Austria) | 4 |
| Belgian Music DVD (Ultratop Flanders) | 2 |
| Belgian Music DVD (Ultratop Wallonia) | 10 |
| Brazilian Music DVD (ABPD) | 13 |
| Dutch Music DVD (MegaCharts) | 7 |
| Finnish Music DVD (Suomen virallinen lista) | 1 |
| French Music DVD (SNEP) | 13 |
| Greek Music DVD (IFPI Greece) | 11 |
| Italian Music DVD (FIMI) | 3 |
| Spanish Music DVD (PROMUSICAE) | 9 |
| Swedish Music DVD (Sverigetopplistan) | 8 |
| US Music Video Sales (Billboard) | 19 |

| Chart (2008) | Position |
|---|---|
| Dutch Music DVD (MegaCharts) | 46 |
| Swedish Music DVD (Sverigetopplistan) | 38 |

| Chart (2009) | Position |
|---|---|
| Swedish Music DVD (Sverigetopplistan) | 97 |

=== All-time DVD charts ===
| Chart (2000–2013) | Position |
|---|---|
| Finnish Foreign Music DVD (Suomen virallinen lista) | 12 |

== Certifications and sales ==
| Region | Certification | Certified units/sales |
Album
| Argentina (CAPIF) | Gold | 20,000^{^} |
| Belgium (BRMA) | Gold | 25,000^{*} |
| Czech Republic | — | 7,582 |
| Mexico (AMPROFON) | Gold | 50,000^{^} |
| Portugal (AFP) | Gold | 10,000^{^} |
| Russia (NFPF) | Gold | 10,000^{*} |
| United Kingdom (BPI) | Silver | 60,000^{^} |
| United States | — | 148,000 |
DVD
| Argentina (CAPIF) | Platinum | 8,000^{^} |
| Argentina (CAPIF) Double package | Platinum | 8,000^{^} |
| Australia (ARIA) | Platinum | 15,000^{^} |
| Austria (IFPI Austria) | Platinum | 10,000^{*} |
| Brazil (Pro-Música Brasil) | Gold | 25,000 |
| Finland (Musiikkituottajat) | Gold | 6,291 |
| Germany (BVMI) | 2× Platinum | 100,000^{^} |
| Italy | — | 25,000 |
| Poland (ZPAV) | Platinum | 10,000^{*} |
| Portugal (AFP) | Platinum | 8,000^{^} |
| Spain (Promusicae) | Gold | 10,000^{^} |
Summaries
| Worldwide | — | 1,000,000 |
^{*} Sales figures based on certification alone.^{^} Shipments figures based on certification alone.

== See also ==
- List of number-one hits of 2007 (Italy)
- List of number-one albums of 2007 (Mexico)
- List of number-one albums of 2007 (Portugal)
- List of number-one albums of 2007 (Spain)
