= Live to Tell =

1986 single by Madonna

Single by Madonna

from the album True Blue
- Released: March 26, 1986
- Recorded: 1985
- Genre: Pop
- Length: 5:51 (album); 4:37 (single)
- Label: Sire; Warner Bros.
- Songwriters: Madonna; Patrick Leonard
- Producers: Madonna; Patrick Leonard

Madonna singles chronology
"Gambler" (1985)	"Live to Tell" (1986)	"Papa Don't Preach" (1986)

Music video
- "Live to Tell" on YouTube

"Live to Tell" is a song by American singer Madonna from her third studio album, True Blue (1986), and also featured in the crime drama At Close Range, starring her then-husband Sean Penn. Originally composed as an instrumental by Patrick Leonard for the film Fire with Fire, the piece was rejected by Paramount, prompting Madonna to adapt it for At Close Range. She wrote the lyrics, added melodies and a bridge, and co-produced the track with Leonard. Lyrically, the torch song in the form of a pop ballad explores themes of deceit, mistrust, and trauma rooted in childhood.

Released on March 26, 1986, in the United States ahead of the film's premiere, "Live to Tell" also served as the lead single from True Blue. Internationally, it was issued on April 14. It was acclaimed, with praise for the vocal performance, and it has since been widely cited as one of Madonna's finest ballads. It was Madonna's third number-one on the US Billboard Hot 100 and her first number-one on the Adult Contemporary chart. It also reached number one in several other countries, including Canada and Italy.

The music video shows Madonna alone in a dark studio, intercut with scenes from At Close Range. Madonna has performed "Live to Tell" in four of her concert tours, most recently on the Celebration Tour (2023–2024). Its most controversial rendition occurred during 2006's Confessions Tour, in which Madonna sang suspended on a mirrored cross wearing a crown of thorns. The performance drew strong condemnation from religious leaders, who accused her of blasphemy; Madonna defended the segment, stating it was meant to highlight the plight of children suffering from AIDS in Africa. The song has since been covered by numerous artists and remains a staple in tribute compilations.

== Background ==
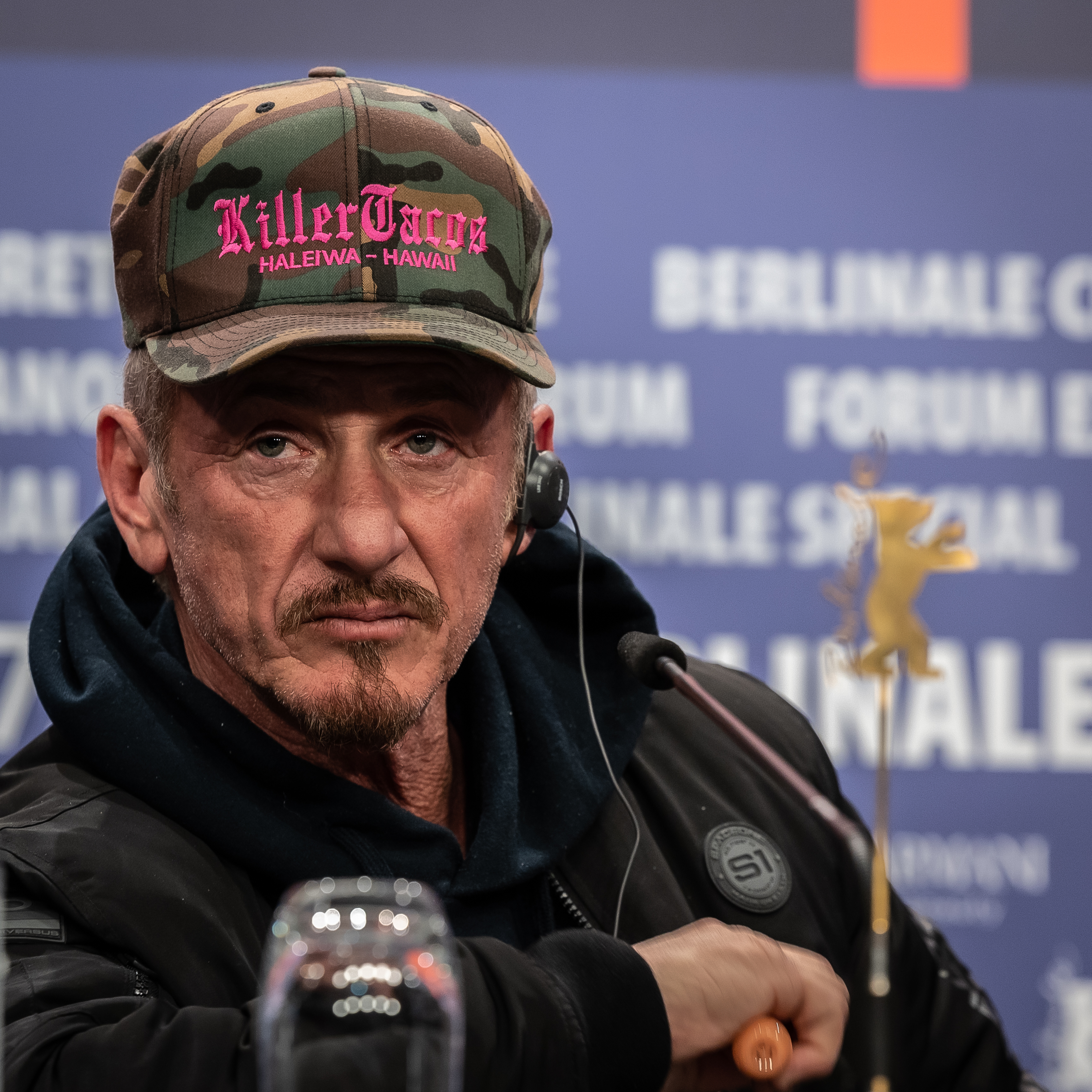
"Live to Tell" was featured in the 1986 film At Close Range, which starred Sean Penn (pictured in 2023), Madonna's husband at the time.

In mid-1985, after completing the Virgin Tour, Madonna began working with musician and producer Patrick Leonard, who had served as the tour's musical director. The two first collaborated on "Love Makes the World Go Round", which Madonna performed at the Live Aid benefit concert in July. Around this time, she married actor Sean Penn, whom she had met on the set of her "Material Girl" music video. Leonard, meanwhile, was aiming to transition into film scoring and composed an instrumental piece intended for Paramount's 1986 film Fire with Fire. However, the studio rejected the track, feeling it did not fit the film's tone.

Madonna, intrigued by the composition, offered to write lyrics for it and proposed using the song for At Close Range, a crime drama starring Penn. According to author Rikky Rooksby, she wrote the lyrics "on the spot", crafting a melody and bridge inspired by the film's themes of family secrets and emotional trauma. "Sometimes when I'm writing songs, I'm just channeling", she later said, adding that the lyrics reflected personal pain and yearning, whether autobiographical or fictional. After recording a demo, she played it for director James Foley and Penn, who responded positively.

Penn called Leonard—who at the time was working with Michael Jackson on Bad (1987)—and invited him to meet. When asked who would sing the song, since the lyrics had been written from a male perspective, Leonard insisted Madonna should perform it. He chose to use the demo vocals, feeling they captured a sense of naivety and emotional rawness that suited the piece. "It was so innocent and so shy. It's as naive, as raw as can be, and that's part of what gave ['Live to Tell'] all its charm", Leonard explained. Recording sessions for True Blue took place at Channel Recording Studios in Los Angeles, where the final version of "Live to Tell" was completed. The track became the second song Madonna and Leonard completed together after "Love Makes the World Go Round".

== Composition and release ==
'Live to Tell'
30-second audio sample of "Live to Tell", featuring Madonna's throaty vocal delivery on the chorus, accompanied by a synthesizer that shifts between the keys of D and F.

Musically, "Live to Tell" is a torch song in the form of a pop ballad. According to the sheet music published by Alfred Publishing Inc., it is composed in the key of F major, set in common time with a moderate tempo of 112 beats per minute. Madonna's vocals are characterized as throaty, spanning nearly one octave from F_{3} to D_{4}. The lyrics have been noted for their vague yet foreboding tone, with interpretations ranging from emotional apocalypse to themes of deceit, mistrust, and childhood trauma. Critics and biographers, including Allen Metz, Carol Benson, Rikky Rooksby, and Boston.com's Scott Kearnan, have suggested the song alludes to carrying the weight of past secrets or abuse.

Madonna herself has offered multiple interpretations of the song's meaning. In earlier interviews, she explained that "Live to Tell" addresses resilience in the face of hardship, describing it as a reflection of her pain and yearning. In a 2009 Rolling Stone interview, she elaborated that while the song could relate to her own childhood or familial relationships, it was intentionally ambiguous —possibly inspired by an F. Scott Fitzgerald novel, a memory, or a combination of both. Musically, the track opens with bold drum beats, synthesizers, and ambient effects before Madonna begins singing, "I have a tale to tell/Sometimes it gets so hard to hide it well". The arrangement includes electric piano, dramatic synths, and subtle guitar strains. The refrain features the line "A man can tell a thousand lies/I've learned my lesson well/Hope I live to tell the secret I have learned", emphasizing the song's introspective tone.

In the US, "Live to Tell" was released on March 26, 1986, ahead of At Close Range (April 18) and True Blue (June 30). A similar strategy was followed internationally, with the single released in Australia, New Zealand, and most European countries on April 14, also preceding the film and album's respective debuts. (Note: See sources cited on "Weekly charts" section) Afterwards, "Live to Tell" was included on three Madonna compilation albums: The Immaculate Collection (1990), Something to Remember (1995), and Celebration (2009).

== Critical reception ==
"Live to Tell" has been acclaimed since its release. AllMusic's Stephen Thomas Erlewine called it a "tremendous ballad that rewrites the rules of adult contemporary crossover", while colleague Stewart Mason noted it was "unlike anything [Madonna] had recorded up to that point". Mason further stated that it was the first of several "dramatic" ballads in her career that showcased her genuine vocal talent, calling it one of her strongest vocal performances. Stereogum's Tom Breihan described the track as "planetarium music", filled with "pure head-blown '80s sci-fi awe", and applauded Madonna's ability to communicate emotion through tone and phrasing. Despite giving True Blue an overall negative review, the Record-Journal's Jim Zebora singled out "Live to Tell" as "absolutely marvelous" with an "enchanting melody and arrangement" and "captivating" lyrics. Publications such as Cash Box, Spin, and PopMatters also commended the song's emotional weight, theatrical tone, and mature production, with The New York Times highlighting it as proof of Madonna's ability to handle "weightier ballads". (Note: Per multiple sources)

Retrospective reviews continue to applaud the song. Critics such as PopMatters' Peter Piatkowski and biographers Allen Metz and Carol Benson praised the ballad's maturity and Madonna's vocal conviction. USA Today's Edna Gundersen deemed it a "moody heart-tugger" and suggested it "may be her best song ever", while Stuff's James Croot described it as "heart-rending and haunting", noting that she attempted to recreate its impact with later ballads such as "This Used to Be My Playground" (1992) and "Take a Bow" (1994), but never quite matched its effect. Slant Magazine's Sal Cinquemani ranked it among her most dramatic reinventions, citing it as one of her richest vocal performances. Similarly, Billboard, Entertainment Weekly, and The Guardian highlighted the song's haunting atmosphere, sophisticated lyricism, and emotional resonance, with Jude Rogers calling it "the best thing [Madonna's] done in cinema".

Writers such as Louis Virtel (TheBacklot.com), Christopher Rosa (Glamour), and Samuel R. Murrian (Parade) have ranked "Live to Tell" among the best songs of her discography, highlighting its introspective tone, sophisticated production, and raw vulnerability. Enio Chola of PopMatters described it as "the definitive Madonna ballad", one that perfectly encapsulates her fears, ambition, and artistry in a moment of rare emotional honesty. There were a few critics that offered more mixed reviews. Rolling Stone's Davitt Sigerson dismissed it as a derivative rewrite of Joni Mitchell's "Both Sides, Now" (1969), while Spin's John Leland was unimpressed with Madonna's delivery and tone. However, such opinions were largely outweighed by praise in both critical rankings and retrospectives.

== Chart performance ==
On the week of April 12, 1986, "Live to Tell" debuted at number 49 on the US Billboard Hot 100, following strong radio support that made it one of the most added tracks across stations. It entered the Adult Contemporary chart at number 28 the following week and, by May, was the most-played song on 229 of 230 reporting radio stations. The single eventually reached number one on the Hot 100 on June 7, becoming Madonna's third chart-topper in the US, and her second number-one single from a film soundtrack, following "Crazy for You". It also marked her first number-one on the Adult Contemporary chart, where it spent three weeks at the top. At the end of 1986, the song ranked number 35 on Billboard's year-end Hot 100, and number 12 on the Adult Contemporary chart.

In Canada, the single debuted at number 79 on the RPM 100 Singles chart dated April 12, eventually reaching number one six weeks later and staying at the top position for two consecutive weeks. It became Madonna's third number-one hit in the country, and it would go on to rank second on the year-end chart. On April 26, "Live to Tell" debuted at number 10 on the UK Singles Chart and peaked at number two the following week; it was certified silver by the British Phonographic Industry (BPI) for 331,000 units shipped. By 2008, it had sold over 271,000 copies in the country. The track also topped the charts in Italy and Greece, reached number two in Ireland and Norway, and placed within the top three in Belgium, Denmark, and the Netherlands. In France, it peaked at number six and earned a silver certification by the Syndicat National de l'Édition Phonographique for 250,000 copies sold. The song reached number six in Australia and number seven in New Zealand.

== Music video ==
The music video, directed by Foley, features intercut scenes of Madonna singing against a dark backdrop with footage from At Close Range, reflecting the inner turmoil of Penn's character. Styled as a minimalist portrait, the video marked a departure from the Madonna's previous visuals, emphasizing subtle glamour inspired by Golden Age icons like Grace Kelly and Marilyn Monroe. She appears in a demure floral dress, with elegant, refined makeup, and described the change as a conscious effort to "clean herself off" after growing tired of flashy jewelry and heavy accessories. It was also the first of her videos to eschew dance routines in favor of a more introspective, narrative-driven approach.

Critics praised the video's tone and cinematic quality. Jeffrey F. Keuss likened its stark emotional presentation to Carl Theodor Dreyer's 1928 film The Passion of Joan of Arc, and the cover artwork for Sinéad O'Connor's I Do Not Want What I Haven't Got (1990), calling it one of Madonna's most authentic portrayals. Author Jeremy G. Butler noted Madonna's role as a tragic chorus, addressing the film's themes through song. Peter Piatkowski described the visual as "gorgeous and stylish", while Tom Breihan highlighted the screen time of actor Christopher Walken. The video was later included in the 2009 compilation Celebration: The Video Collection, and ranked as the 17th best of Madonna's career by Samuel R. Murrian.

== Live performances ==
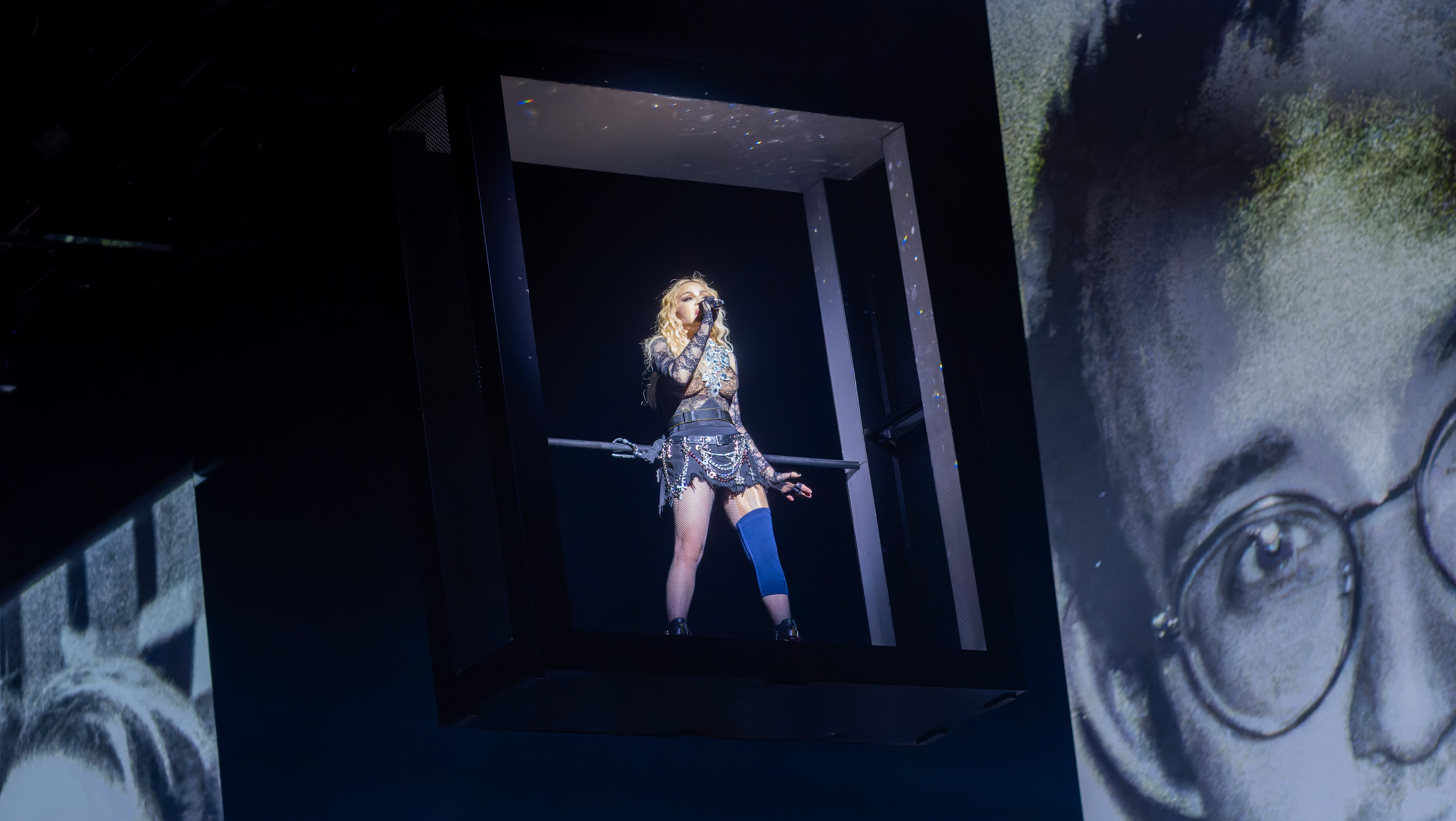
Madonna singing "Live to Tell" from atop a floating portal frame on the Celebration Tour (2023―2024)

Madonna has performed "Live to Tell" in four of her concert tours: Who's That Girl (1987), Blond Ambition (1990), Confessions (2006), and Celebration (2023―2024). On the Who's That Girl Tour, Madonna sang standing still under a spotlight, dressed in a black tassel-trimmed outfit designed by Marlene Stewart. The Los Angeles Times praised her delicate and emotive delivery, while The Washington Post felt the ballad did not translate well to a stadium setting. This rendition was captured in Who's That Girl: Live in Japan and Ciao Italia: Live from Italy, filmed in Tokyo and Turin, respectively.

During the Blond Ambition World Tour, the song was presented as part of a medley with "Oh Father" (1989) and staged with Catholic imagery. Madonna wore black clerical-inspired attire and performed in front of a large stained glass window, kneeling on a prie-dieu as dancer Carlton Wilborn portrayed a priest. (Note: Per multiple sources) Critics highlighted the vocal strength of the performance, which appears in Blond Ambition Japan Tour 90, Blond Ambition World Tour Live, and the 1991 documentary Madonna: Truth or Dare.

The song's performance on the Confessions Tour saw Madonna singing while suspended on a mirrored cross, wearing a crown of thorns. The backdrop screens displayed statistics about children affected by AIDS in Africa; some reviewers praised her vocals, while others criticized the number as preachy or overly provocative. A recording of the performance appears on The Confessions Tour live album and video (2007).

On the Celebration Tour, Madonna performed "Live to Tell" as a tribute to victims of the HIV/AIDS epidemic. Following "Holiday" (1983), the stage cleared, leaving one dancer who collapsed before Madonna, prompting her to gently cover him with a trench coat. Wearing a Swarovski crystal teardrop necklace, she sang from a floating portal frame that drifted above the audience, as images of those lost to AIDS —including Keith Haring, Herb Ritts, and Freddie Mercury— were projected on large screens. (Note: Per multiple sources) Below, a clown carrying a red balloon moved solemnly past the portraits. Rolling Stone's Kory Grow compared the number to an awards ceremony's in memoriam segment, while Kate Solomon from British newspaper i deemed it "one of the most moving pop performances [I've] ever seen".

=== Controversy ===
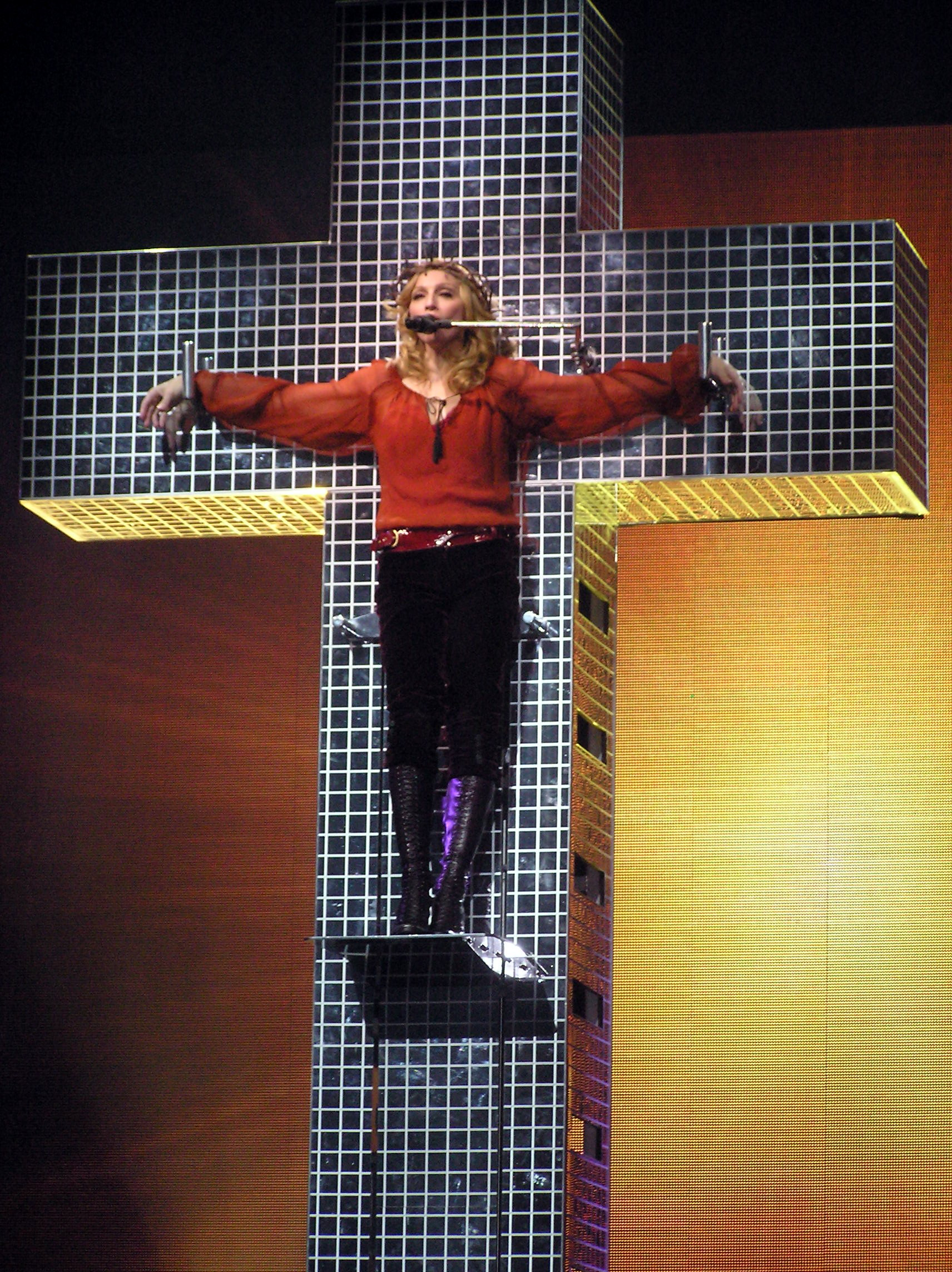
The Confessions Tour's crucifixion-themed performance drew widespread criticism from religious groups.

The Confessions Tour performance sparked international controversy for its use of crucifixion imagery. Religious leaders across Europe condemned the act: German prosecutors in Düsseldorf considered filing blasphemy charges, with Protestant bishop Margot Käßmann stating that, "maybe the only way an aging superstar can attract attention is to offend people's religious sentiments". The Russian Orthodox Church and the Federation of Jewish Communities of Russia (FJCR) described the performance as amoral and urged people not to attend the concert in the country. In Italy, where the performance was staged near the Vatican, cardinal Ersilio Tonini called it a "scandal created on purpose by astute merchants to attract publicity", while Muslim World League president Mario Scialoja remarked it wasn't the "first time [Madonna] stages such an act".

A spokesperson for the Catholic Church in England and Wales called the use of the crucifix a "banal perversion" of a sacred symbol. Some members of the clergy offered a more favorable view. A pastor from North Denver described the performance as "powerful and very reverent", praising its call to acknowledge and act on behalf of vulnerable children around the world. Due to the controversy surrounding the number, The Confessions Tour release was banned in Singapore, Malaysia, and parts of East Asia. Madonna responded with a formal statement defending the performance and clarifying its message:

I am very grateful that my show was so well received all over the world. But there seems to be many misinterpretations about my appearance on the cross and I wanted to explain it myself once and for all. There is a segment in my show where three of my dancers "confess" or share harrowing experiences from their childhood that they ultimately overcame. My "confession" follows and takes place on a Crucifix that I ultimately come down from. This is not a mocking of the church. It is no different than a person wearing a Cross or "Taking Up the Cross" as it says in the Bible. My performance is neither anti-Christian, sacrilegious or blasphemous. Rather, it is my plea to the audience to encourage mankind to help one another and to see the world as a unified whole. I believe in my heart that if Jesus were alive today he would be doing the same thing.

My specific intent is to bring attention to the millions of children in Africa who are dying every day, and are living without care, without medicine and without hope. I am asking people to open their hearts and minds to get involved in whatever way they can. The song ends with a quote from the Bible's Book of Matthew: "For I was hungry and you gave me food. I was naked and you gave me clothing. I was sick and you took care of me and God replied, 'Whatever you did for the least of my brothers ... you did it to me.'"

Please do not pass judgment without seeing my show".

== Covers ==
A wide range of artists across various genres have covered and reinterpreted "Live to Tell". In 1992, American guitarist Bill Frisell included a version on his album Have a Little Faith. New wave band Berlin recorded a rendition for Virgin Voices: A Tribute to Madonna, Vol. 1 (1999), with lead vocalist Terri Nunn noting it was the only Madonna song she felt compelled to cover. In 2001, Italian singer Lucrezia released a dance version remixed by David Morales, which reached number two on Billboard's Hot Dance Club Play. Canadian jazz vocalist Carol Welsman recorded a version for her 2007 self-titled album, while folk act Winter Flowers included a version on Through the Wilderness.

Hi-NRG and electronic takes include a 1998 remix EP by Blonde Ambition, Melissa Totten's version on Forever Madonna (2008), and a gothic metal cover by Lacuna Coil on the deluxe edition of Delirium (2016). Additional renditions include Semi Moore's take for The Material Girl: A Tribute to Madonna (2000), a classical adaptation on Vitamin String Quartet's The String Quartet Tribute to Madonna (2002), and Deerhoof's version for Post-Trash: Volume Three (2018). American singer-songwriter Little Wings recorded a stripped-down folk version in 2015, and dark wave band Ego Likeness released their interpretation in 2023. Tori Amos has also performed the song live during her career.

== Track listing and formats ==
- US, Canadian, German, and UK seven-inch single
1. "Live to Tell" (7-inch edit) – 4:37
2. "Live to Tell" (instrumental) – 5:49
- US, Canadian, German, and UK twelve-inch maxi-single
1. "Live to Tell" (LP version) – 5:49
2. "Live to Tell" (7-inch edit) – 4:37
3. "Live to Tell" (instrumental) – 5:49
- German and UK reissue CD maxi-single (1995)
1. "Live to Tell" (LP version) – 5:49
2. "Live to Tell" (7-inch edit) – 4:37
3. "Live to Tell" (instrumental) – 5:49

== Credits and personnel ==
Credits and personnel are adapted from the liner notes of both the True Blue album and US twelve-inch single.

- Madonna – lyrics, producer, vocals
- Bruce Gaitsch – guitar
- Patrick Leonard – drum programming, keyboard, producer
- Jonathan Moffett – drums
- Michael Verdick – audio mixing, engineer
- Herb Ritts – photography
- Jeri McManus – design

== Charts ==
=== Weekly charts ===
Weekly chart performance for "Live to Tell"
Chart (1986)	Peak position
Australia (Kent Music Report)	7
Belgium (Ultratop 50 Flanders)	3
Canada Top Singles (RPM)	1
Canada Retail Singles (The Record)	1
Denmark (IFPI)	3
European Hot 100 Singles (Music & Media)	1
European Airplay Top 50 (Music & Media)	1
Finland (Suomen virallinen lista)	7
France (SNEP)	6
Greece (IFPI)	1
Iceland (RÚV)	3
Ireland (IRMA)	2
Italy (Musica e dischi)	1
Japan (Oricon Singles Chart)	41
Netherlands (Dutch Top 40)	3
Netherlands (Single Top 100)	3
New Zealand (Recorded Music NZ)	6
Norway (VG-lista)	2
Portugal (IFPI)	12
Sweden (Sverigetopplistan)	11
Switzerland (Schweizer Hitparade)	4
UK Singles (Official Charts)	2
US Billboard Hot 100	1
US Adult Contemporary (Billboard)	1
US Dance Singles Sales (Billboard)	3
US Cash Box Top 100	1
US CHR & Pop (Radio & Records)	1
Uruguay (IFPI)	5
West Germany (GfK)	12

Weekly chart performance for "Live to Tell"
Chart (2025)	Peak position
UK Singles Downloads Chart	50

=== Year-end charts ===
Year-end chart performance for "Live to Tell"
Chart (1986)	Position
Australia (Kent Music Report)	59
Belgium (Ultratop 50 Flanders)	35
Brazil (Brazilian Radio Airplay)	52
Canada Top Singles (RPM)	2
European Hot 100 Singles (Music & Media)	10
France (SNEP)	60
Italy (Musica e dischi)	2
Netherlands (Dutch Top 40)	25
Netherlands (Single Top 100)	22
New Zealand (RIANZ)	31
Switzerland (Schweizer Hitparade)	11
UK Singles (OCC)	58
US Billboard Hot 100	35
US 12-inch Singles Sales (Billboard)	37
US Adult Contemporary (Billboard)	12
US Cash Box Top 100	3
West Germany (Media Control)	74

== Certifications and sales ==
Certifications and sales for "Live to Tell"
Region	Certification	Certified units/sales
Brazil	—	60,000
Japan	—	23,850
France (SNEP)	Silver	250,000^{*}
United Kingdom (BPI)	Silver	331,000
^{*} Sales figures based on certification alone.

== Bibliography ==
- Barcella, Laura (2012). Madonna and Me: Women Writers on the Queen of Pop. Catapult Books. ISBN 978-1-59376-429-6.
- Bronson, Fred (2003). The Billboard Book of Number 1 Hits. Billboard Books. ISBN 0-8230-7677-6.
- Butler, Jeremy G. (2002). Television: Critical Methods and Applications. Lawrence Erlbaum Associates. ISBN 0-8058-4209-8.
- Clerk, Carol (2002). Madonnastyle. Omnibus Press. ISBN 0-7119-8874-9.
- Gabriel, Mary (2023). Madonna: A Rebel Life. Hachette UK. ISBN 978-0-316-45644-9.
- Keuss, Jeffrey F. (2011). Your Neighbor's Hymnal: What Popular Music Teaches Us about Faith, Hope, and Love. Wipf and Stock Publishers. ISBN 978-1-60899-369-7.
- Marsh, Dave (1999). The Heart of Rock & Soul: The 1001 Greatest Singles Ever Made. Da Capo Press. ISBN 0-306-80901-X.
- Metz, Allen; Benson, Carol (1999). The Madonna Companion: Two Decades of Commentary. Music Sales Group. ISBN 0-8256-7194-9.
- Rettenmund, Matthew (1995). Encyclopedia Madonnica. St. Martin's Press. ISBN 0-312-11782-5.
- Rooksby, Rikky (2004). The Complete Guide to the Music of Madonna. Omnibus Press. ISBN 0-7119-9883-3.
