= Nicki Richards =

American singer-songwriter

Nicki Richards (born Honolulu, Hawaii, United States on March 24) is an American singer, songwriter, producer and actress based in Manhattan, New York City. She is also known as a backing singer for a number of artists and on a big number of studio recordings. Her father was a high-ranking African-American naval officer and her mother, Donna Blackmon, a singer. Nicki's brother, Philip Richards is a singer / musician in his own right and collaborated with her in her works.

Nicki Richards had her first public appearances in commercials when she was only five years old. She had her break when she won the Grand Prize on the singing competition Star Search. In 1991, she released her own debut album Naked (To the World) on Atlantic Records written and co-produced by her after being signed to a deal by Ahmet Ertegun. The set featured two Top 40 singles in "Naked" and a cover of Seals & Crofts' "Summer Breeze."

Subsequently, she recorded and performed for several years with Madonna, (including Confessions Tour, Sticky & Sweet Tour, MDNA Tour and Rebel Heart Tour), Mariah Carey, Whitney Houston, Mick Jagger, Michael Jackson, Tina Turner, Gloria Estefan, Celine Dion, Stevie Wonder, Linda Ronstadt, Mary J. Blige, Missy Elliott, Lenny Kravitz, Anastacia, Lady Gaga, Bette Midler, Maxi Priest, Al Green, The Cover Girls, Daniel Levitin and many more.

She made her acting debut in the 1999 film Colorz of Rage directed by Dale Resteghini and in Chicago, as part of a female ensemble and in two musical comedies by Robert Klein. She took part in a number of theater productions Cy Coleman's Like Jazz in Los Angeles, Jim Steinman's Over The Top on the East Coast, and the Penumbra Theatre Company's "Spunk" by Zora Neale Hurston and "Beehive" both in the Minneapolis/St. Paul area. She performed on the PBS television show Between the Lions, a puppet educational show. She has also appeared on a number of commercials (Burger King, Coca-Cola and Colgate).

After a string of singles with Frankie Knuckles, Tony Moran, and other dance artists, she continued her recording output as an independent artist with the self-titled Nicki (2008) and Tell Me... (2012). The former album produced two singles "Bring the Love" and "Why You Wanna Hurt Me So Bad" that made chart showings in the Top 40 oF the Billboard Dance Club Play charts. After another hiatus, she released the jazz effort Asta Hairston Songbook (2022) with Christian McBride and Gustavo Casenave. In September 2024, she released a New Orleans-inspired single "Anything" from a forthcoming studio album. Richards' latest studio album Love Life was released July 1, 2025.

== Albums Discography ==
- 1991: Naked (To the World)
- 2008: Nicki
- 2012: Bedtime Story (Tell Me)
- 2022: Asta Hairston Songbook (with Gustavo Casenave & Christian McBride)
- 2025: Love Life

== Singles Discography ==
- 1991: "Naked"
- 1991: "Summer Breeze"
- 1991: "Sunshine"
- 2001: "Keep On Movin" (Frankie Knuckles feat. Nicki Richards)
- 2008: "Bring the Love"
- 2008: "Why You Wanna Hurt Me So Bad"
- 2012: "Lay Your Hands On Me"
- 2024: "Anything"
- 2024: "You Become More Beautiful"
- 2025: "Tether Me"
- 2025: "New Orleans"

== Filmography ==
- 1999: Colorz of Rage .... Debbie
- 2000: Robert Klein: Child in His 50s .... Singer (TV)
- 2002: Chicago .... Female ensemble (credited as Nicky Richards)
- 2005: Robert Klein: The Amorous Busboy of Decatur Avenue .... Singer (TV)

== Theater ==
- Like Jazz written by Cy Coleman and Marilyn & Alan Bergman, directed by Gordon Davidson (world premiere, Los Angeles)
- Over the Top directed by Jim Steinman (East Coast)
- Spunk directed by Zora Neale Hurston (Saint Paul, Minnesota)
- Beehive (Saint Paul, Minnesota)
