= Confessions Tour =

2006 concert tour by Madonna

- Tour by Madonna
- Promotional poster for the tour
- Location: Asia; Europe; North America
- Associated album: Confessions on a Dance Floor
- Start date: May 21, 2006
- End date: September 21, 2006
- Legs: 3
- No. of shows: 60
- Supporting act: Paul Oakenfold
- Box office: US$194.7 million (Note: US$310.95 million in 2025 dollars.)

Madonna concert chronology
- Re-Invention World Tour (2004); Confessions Tour (2006); Sticky & Sweet Tour (2008–2009)

The Confessions Tour was the seventh concert tour by American singer-songwriter Madonna, launched in support of her tenth studio album, Confessions on a Dance Floor (2005). The tour began on May 21, 2006, at the Forum in Inglewood, California, and concluded on September 21 at the Tokyo Dome in Japan, visiting venues across North America and Eurasia. It marked Madonna's first performances in Russia, Wales, the Czech Republic, and Denmark.

Like her previous tours, Confessions was divided into thematic segments —Equestrian, Bedouin, Never Mind the Bollocks, and Disco. The show received generally positive reviews from critics; however, the performance of "Live to Tell" (1986), which depicted Madonna suspended on a mirrored cross wearing a crown of thorns, drew strong condemnation from religious leaders, particularly during the concert in Rome. Madonna defended the segment, stating it was intended to raise awareness about the millions of children dying from AIDS in Africa.

Despite the controversy, the tour was a commercial success. Tickets sold out rapidly worldwide, prompting the addition of new dates. Grossing over US$194.7 million ($310.95 million in 2025 dollars) from 60 shows and 1.2 million attendees, it became the highest-grossing tour for a female artist at the time, surpassing Cher's Living Proof: The Farewell Tour (2002―05). It received accolades including Most Creative Stage Production at the Pollstar Concert Industry Awards and Top Boxscore from the Billboard Touring Conference and Awards, and was recognized by Guinness World Records as the highest-grossing music tour per concert. The London performances at Wembley Arena were filmed and broadcast live on NBC as Madonna: The Confessions Tour Live from London, and later released as a live album and DVD under the title The Confessions Tour (2007).

== Background ==
In late 2005, following the release of her tenth studio album Confessions on a Dance Floor, Madonna began discussing plans for a new tour. After debuting the lead single "Hung Up" at the MTV Europe Music Awards in October, she expressed interest in returning to Australia, where she had not performed in over a decade. To promote the album, she made appearances on programs such as Wetten, dass..?, Entertainment Tonight and Access Hollywood, and held intimate performances at London venues like KOKO and G-A-Y. In interviews with Billboard and The Guardian, she confirmed that a tour was being planned for 2006, describing it as "all-out disco" and debating between the titles Confessions and Confess Your Sins. Jamie King, who had previously directed Madonna's Drowned World (2001) and Re-Invention (2004) concert tours, stated that she initially envisioned the show in smaller venues, reflecting the album's intimate tone, but it would eventually expand to arenas and stadiums.

The tour was officially announced on February 9, 2006, during an appearance on The Ellen DeGeneres Show, with Madonna later stating that she wanted to "turn the world into one big dance floor." Following a warm-up performance at Coachella, tour dates were revealed on April 3, spanning North America, Europe, and Japan. Titled Confessions Tour, it began on May 21 at Inglewood, California, and concluded on September 21 at Tokyo. It also marked her first concerts in Russia, Wales, Denmark, and the Czech Republic. A planned Australian leg was canceled midway through the tour, with Madonna citing logistical issues and her children’s school schedule. In a public statement, she expressed disappointment and promised to return to Australia in the future.

== Development ==
=== Conception and stage setup ===
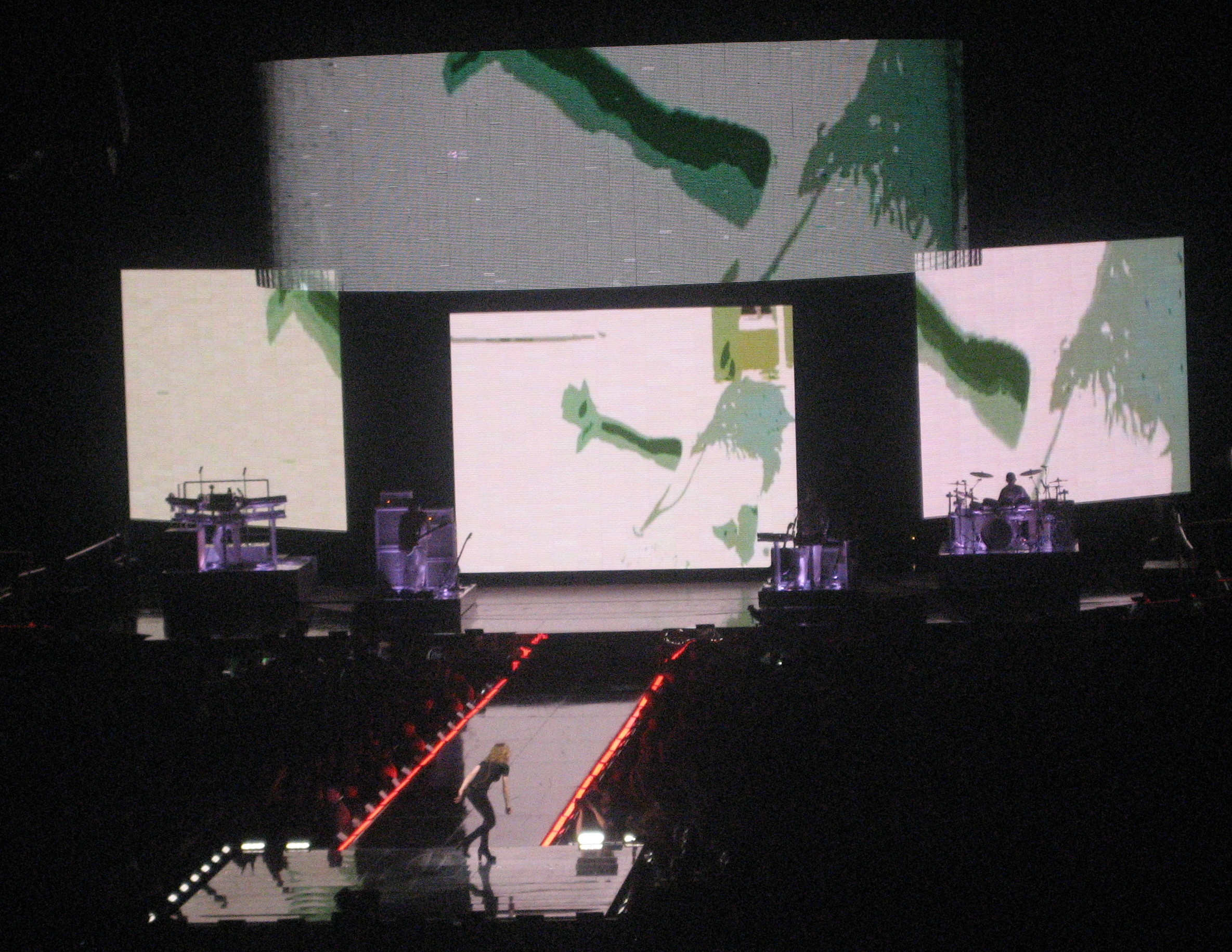
A wide view of the stage, featuring the main runway, three LED backdrop screens, and the semi-circular curtain screen suspended above.

Both Madonna and King confirmed that the tour's set list would focus heavily on material from Confessions on a Dance Floor. The singer stated she wanted to highlight the new album, having already performed her "old stuff" on the Re-Invention Tour. King echoed the sentiment, explaining, "people love it [the new album], and they want to hear it." He also aimed to make the show "more interactive", with a design that would place Madonna "as close to her people — her fans, her dancers, her fellow supporters — as possible."

The tour featured a diverse ensemble including longtime backing vocalist and dancer Donna De Lory, vocalist Nicki Richards, guitarist Monte Pittman, keyboardist and musical director Stuart Price, and Yitzhak Sinwani from the London Kabbalah Centre. The 12 dancers included Sofia Boutella and parkour pioneer Sébastien Foucan, with whom Madonna trained in parkour. The concert was divided into four themed acts: Equestrian, Bedouin, Never Mind the Bollocks, and Disco. The official tour poster featured images from Madonna's promotional concert at G-A-Y, photographed by Steven Klein. DJ Paul Oakenfold served as the opening act on select European dates.

Production was led by Chris Lamb, with creative decisions made collaboratively but ultimately approved by Madonna. Lighting designer Roy Bennett described the show as "extremely theatrical and very big", likening it to being in a nightclub or a disco. The stage was twice the size of the one used for Re-Invention and featured three illuminated runways leading to satellite B-stages in the front and sides. The main runway ended in a small dance floor, while the side runways were lined with fencing.

The centerpiece of the stage was a semi-circular, hydraulic lift that rotated and rose —originally used during the Re-Invention Tour— accompanied by three V9 LED video screens. A semi-circular LED curtain descended during certain numbers to create a 3D visual effect. The production featured elaborate props, including five suspended disco balls, a black mechanical saddle for "Like a Virgin" (1984), monkey bars for "Jump", a mirrored cross, a crown of thorns, and a large steel cage. The most elaborate element was a giant disco ball encrusted with $2 million in Swarovski crystals, from which Madonna made her entrance each night. A total of 70 tons of equipment were used for the tour, transported across cities via two private planes, 24 semi-trucks, and a fleet of buses and vans. X-ray radiographies of Madonna's injuries from a 2005 horseback riding accident were projected as visuals during "Like a Virgin".

=== Fashion ===
The tour's wardrobe was designed by Jean Paul Gaultier, with additional collaboration from stylist Arianne Phillips. The overall aesthetic drew inspiration from a range of sources, including Saturday Night Fever (1977), Starlight Express (1984), and Fame (1980). For the opening Equestrian segment, Madonna was inspired by a theatrical horse show in Paris that Gaultier had taken her to. This led to a horseback riding theme, with male dancers dressed as horses wearing harnesses and saddle-like details. The singer's look included a black top hat with a horse's tail, inspired by one of the costumes worn by Romy Schneider in Luchino Visconti's 1973 film Ludwig. Gaultier noted that Madonna had "strong opinions" on ensuring the outfits were functional for high-intensity choreography.

Other ensembles included a "Biblical chic" off-the-shoulder blouse with velvet cropped pants and a crown of thorns, along with jodhpurs, jackets, and blouses made from rich fabrics like taffeta, duchesse, satin, Chantilly lace, and silk chiffon. In line with the disco theme of Confessions on a Dance Floor, Gaultier also created a white suit modeled after John Travolta's in Saturday Night Fever, a one-shouldered unitard adorned with purple Swarovski crystals reminiscent of ABBA, a satin cape embroidered with "Dancing Queen", and a pink glittering jumpsuit. At one point, Madonna also donned a leather jacket with a dramatically high feathered collar —an outfit evoking Suzi Quatro and the 1970s glam rock scene.

== Concert synopsis ==
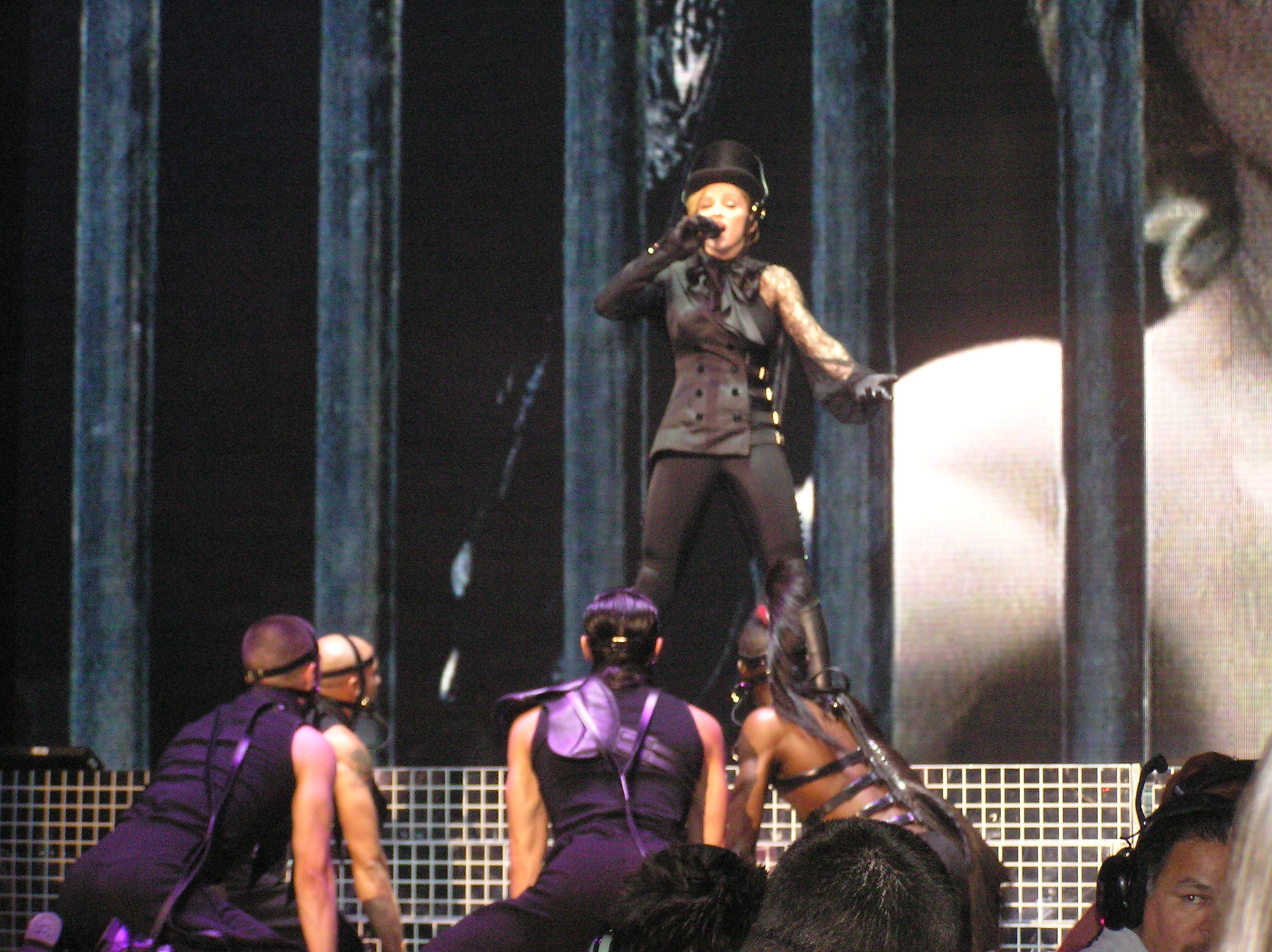
Madonna, flanked by dancers, opening the concert with a mashup performance of "Future Lovers" and Donna Summer's "I Feel Love" (1977).

The concert opened with a video of Madonna walking through a stable with a riding crop, followed by dancers in leather bridles galloping along the stage's three runways. A giant disco ball descended and opened to reveal Madonna inside, dressed in a black riding outfit. She launched into a mashup of "Future Lovers" and Donna Summer's "I Feel Love" (1977). This was followed by "Get Together", performed wth sensual choreography on the main catwalk, and "Like a Virgin", during which Madonna rode a black saddle as X-ray imagery of her horseback accident injuries flashed on the screens. For "Jump", which closed the first segment, a steel monkey bar structure descended as Madonna sang and dancers executed parkour moves.

The Bedouin act began with an interlude entitled "Confessions", where three dancers recounted personal traumas. This performance segued into "Live to Tell". Suspended from a mirrored cross and wearing a crown of thorns, Madonna sang as a death toll of AIDS victims in Africa counted down above her. She continued with "Forbidden Love", featuring two male dancers intertwining beneath visuals of blood cells. Then came "Isaac", where Yitzhak Sinwani played a horn as a veiled dancer performed inside a massive cage. "Sorry" recreated the choreography of its music video, with Madonna and her dancers confined inside the cage. The act ended with "Like It or Not", a solo chair dance performance.

The Never Mind the Bollocks segment began with a politically charged video interlude set to a remixed "Sorry" followed, displaying imagery of world leaders like George W. Bush and Osama bin Laden alongside scenes of war and famine, with dancers krumping onstage. The interlude transitioned into "I Love New York", in which Madonna played electric guitar in a black leather jacket and altered the lyrics to criticize then-president George W. Bush, while a New York City skyline played in the background. She continued the guitar-driven set with "Ray of Light", backed by synchronized dancers in black suits and white ties. For "Let It Will Be", Madonna danced energetically across the stage alone, then shifted into a stripped-down version of "Drowned World/Substitute for Love". She closed the act with "Paradise (Not For Me)", performed acoustically with Sinwani as cherry blossoms illuminated the screens.

The final segment, Disco, began with a video interlude featuring clips from Madonna's earlier hits set to a mashup of "Borderline", "Erotica", "Dress You Up", "Holiday", and The Trammps' "Disco Inferno" (1976). Dancers in roller skates filled the runways before Madonna returned in the white Travolta suit to perform "Music", which sampled True Blue track "Where’s the Party". She then transitioned into a ballroom-style performance of "Erotica", which incorporated lyrics from the original demo version, "You Thrill Me". A lively dance remix of "La Isla Bonita" followed, with tropical visuals on screen. The penultimate number, a modernized version of "Lucky Star" was performed with De Lory and Richards. As the beat gradually shifted, the final number "Hung Up" began. The performance featured an audience sing-along and ballons dropping from the ceiling. As the music faded and the lights dimmed, the phrase "Have you confessed?" appeared on screen, marking the end of the show.

== Critical reception ==
The Confessions Tour received generally positive reviews. Don Chareunsy from The San Diego Union-Tribune noted that while Drowned World and Re-Invention were "excellent concerts", Madonna "stepped it up a few notches" for Confessions. Ben Wener of the Orange County Register described the show as "multimedia, cross-cultural preaching to the choir on a scale only U2 has reached lately", adding that, "no one —but no one— stages elaborate eye-candy productions like Madonna". Entertainment Weeklys Chris Willman gave it an A− and called it "her most enthralling concert to date". The Sunday Times similarly stated that Madonna was "doing what she is best at, and doing it brilliantly".

Critics frequently praised the show's mix of spectacle and energy. Leslie Gray Streeter from The Palm Beach Post called it "an exciting testament to energy, longevity and the sheer love of a beat". The Globe and Mail's Matthew Hays described it as "naughty, brazenly kitschy and wildly entertaining", adding that Madonna "seemed intent on proving something —that she still knows how to have fun— and she delivered". Christian John Wikane of PopMatters noted that, "even the most cynical music lover would find elements of 'The Confessions Tour' impressive". Brynn Mandel of the Republican-American wrote, "Though nothing less has come to be expected of the Material Girl, she once again proved herself not just a singer but an entertainer extraordinaire".

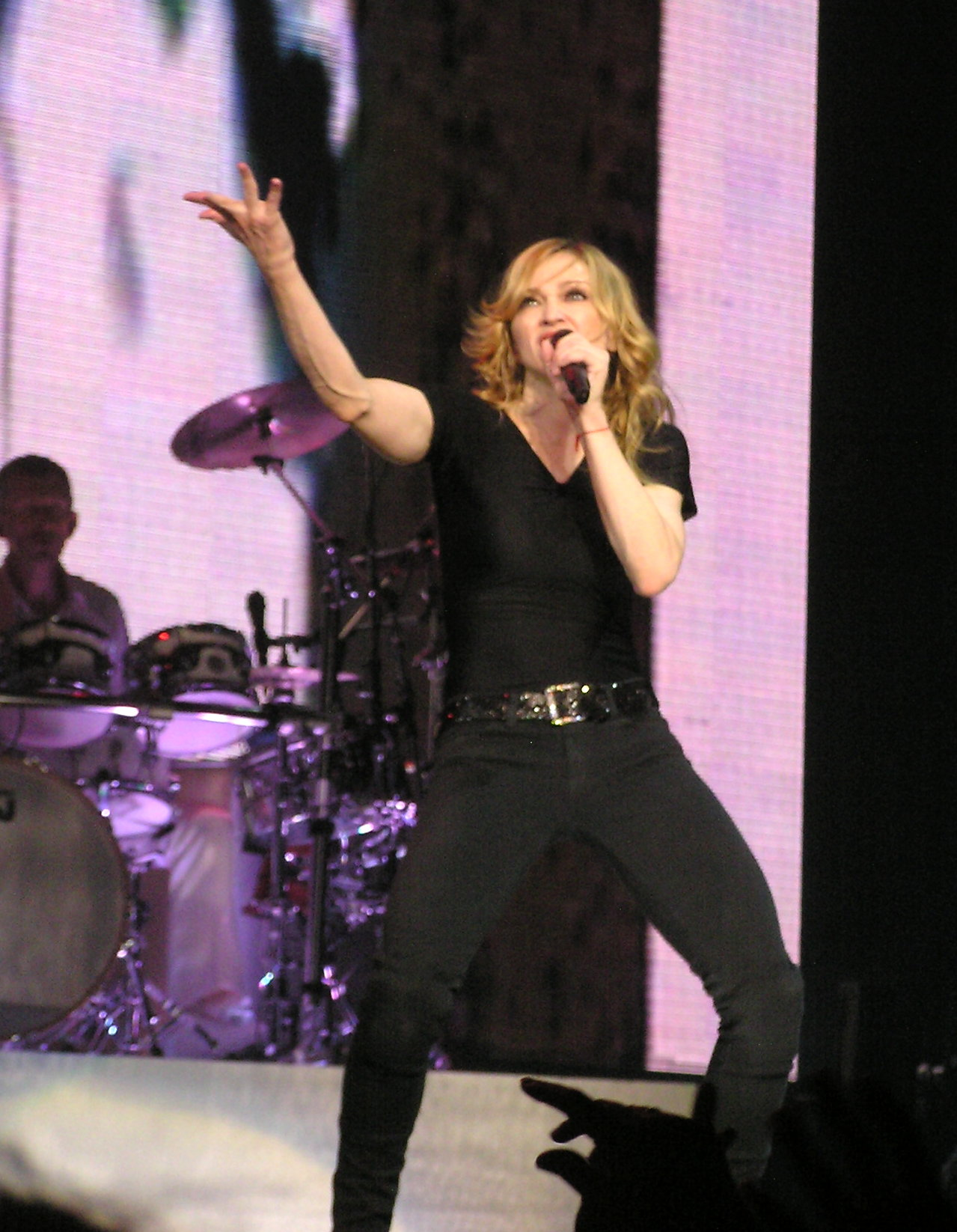
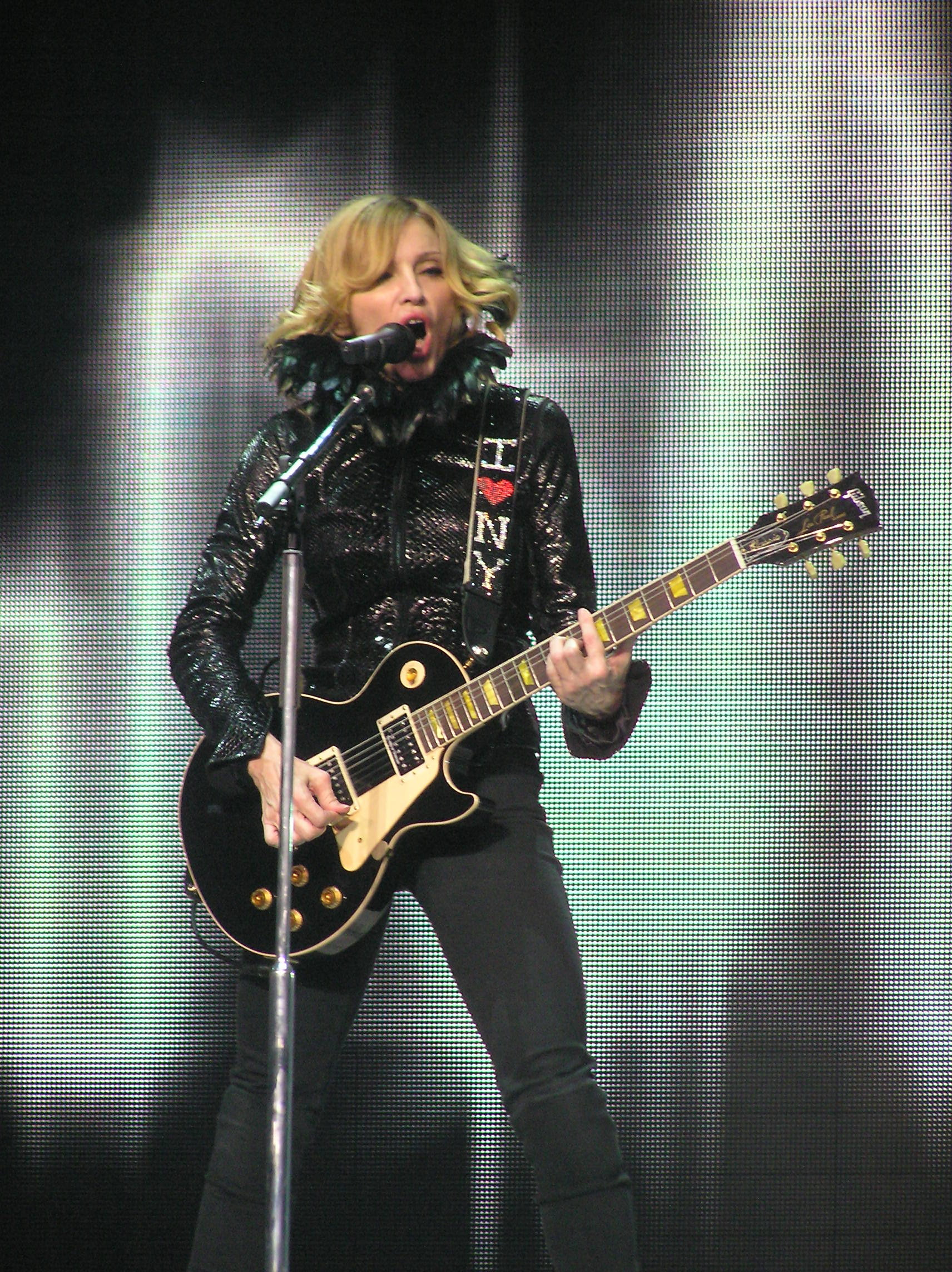
Performances such as "Let It Will Be" (left) and "I Love New York" (right) were singled out for praise by critics.

Specific performances also drew attention. "Let It Will Be" was widely cited as a highlight, with Willman calling it, "as rock & roll as anything Courtney Love will ever do", and The Guardian's Kitty Empire praising the physicality of the choreography. Slant Magazine's Ed Gonzalez called "Get Together", "I Love New York", and "Erotica" standouts, and noted that Madonna "risked a personal connection with her fans unseen since the Girlie Show". Greg Kot of the Chicago Tribune, highlighted the homosexual undertones during the performance of "Forbidden Love", writing, "The intent was unmistakable and moving". Liz Smith of The Baltimore Sun remarked on Madonna's "impressive guitar licks" during "I Love New York", describing her as a "rock-chick extraordinaire".

Madonna's vocals and stamina were also acknowledged. Edna Gundersen of USA Today said she was, "as fit vocally as physically", praising how she handled "tender passages or a demanding upper register after strenuous bump-and-grind workouts". The East Valley Tribune noted her "impeccable shape" and vocal consistency, while Wales Online called the show a "spectacle", adding, "While the songs were powerful, it was the all-round theatrics that threatened to leave the audience speechless". The Miami Herald observed that while the setlist lacked some surprises, "[Madonna] seemed to be enjoying herself more on this one —and so did we".

Still, some reviewers were more reserved. Eric Danton of the Hartford Courant said the show was "packed with throbbing beats and ethereal, trance-like vocals", but felt the music was "almost incidental —this show was about production values". Greg Kot opined that, "a good time may have been had by all, but no real connection was made", and Sandy Cohen of The Washington Post commented that even Madonna flipping off the crowd "felt scripted, not subversive". In Denmark, Berlingske Tidende called the show "impressive", but others criticized the venue and pacing. Simon Price from The Independent panned the Never Mind the Bollocks segment as "embarrassing", calling the symbolism "crass" and her antics "fatuous". Despite the critiques, the tour won Most Creative Stage Production at the 2006 Pollstar Concert Industry Awards. In later rankings, The Advocate and VH1 placed it among Madonna's top tours, and in 2024, Billboard's Sal Cinquemani named it her best, calling it a "culmination of everything she had learned from Blond Ambition through Re-Invention [...] her most cohesive and consistently thrilling show to date.

== Commercial performance ==
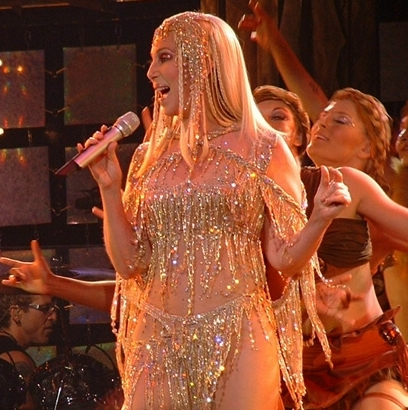
Confessions surpassed Cher's Living Proof: The Farewell Tour (picture) as the highest-grossing tour by a female artist.

The Confessions Tour was a major commercial success. Ahead of its launch, industry analysts predicted it could gross up to $190 million. Within days of ticket sales opening, Madonna sold out 28 shows across cities including New York, Los Angeles, Paris, and London. The first two Madison Square Garden dates sold out in 10 minutes, leading to the addition of three more shows. In Montreal, 30,000 tickets were sold in under 40 minutes. London’s initial two Wembley Arena concerts also sold out within minutes, with such high traffic that Madonna's official website crashed; seven more dates were added to meet demand. Other notable sellouts included a 60,000-person crowd in Cardiff, an 85,000-person concert in Horsens —one of Denmark’s largest ever— and a sold-out Moscow show with 37,000 tickets gone in three days.

By the tour's end, Confessions had grossed over $194.7 million ($311 million in 2025 dollars) from 60 shows, with a total attendance of 1.2 million, making it the highest-grossing tour for a female artist —surpassing Cher's Living Proof: The Farewell Tour (2002―05). Tour producer Arthur Fogel praised its success, saying, "Madonna has yet again delivered an incredible show for her fans... she absolutely belongs at number one". The tour earned Madonna a Guinness World Record for highest-grossing music tour per concert and received Top Boxscore at the 2006 Billboard Touring Awards.

== Controversy surrounding the performance of "Live to Tell" ==
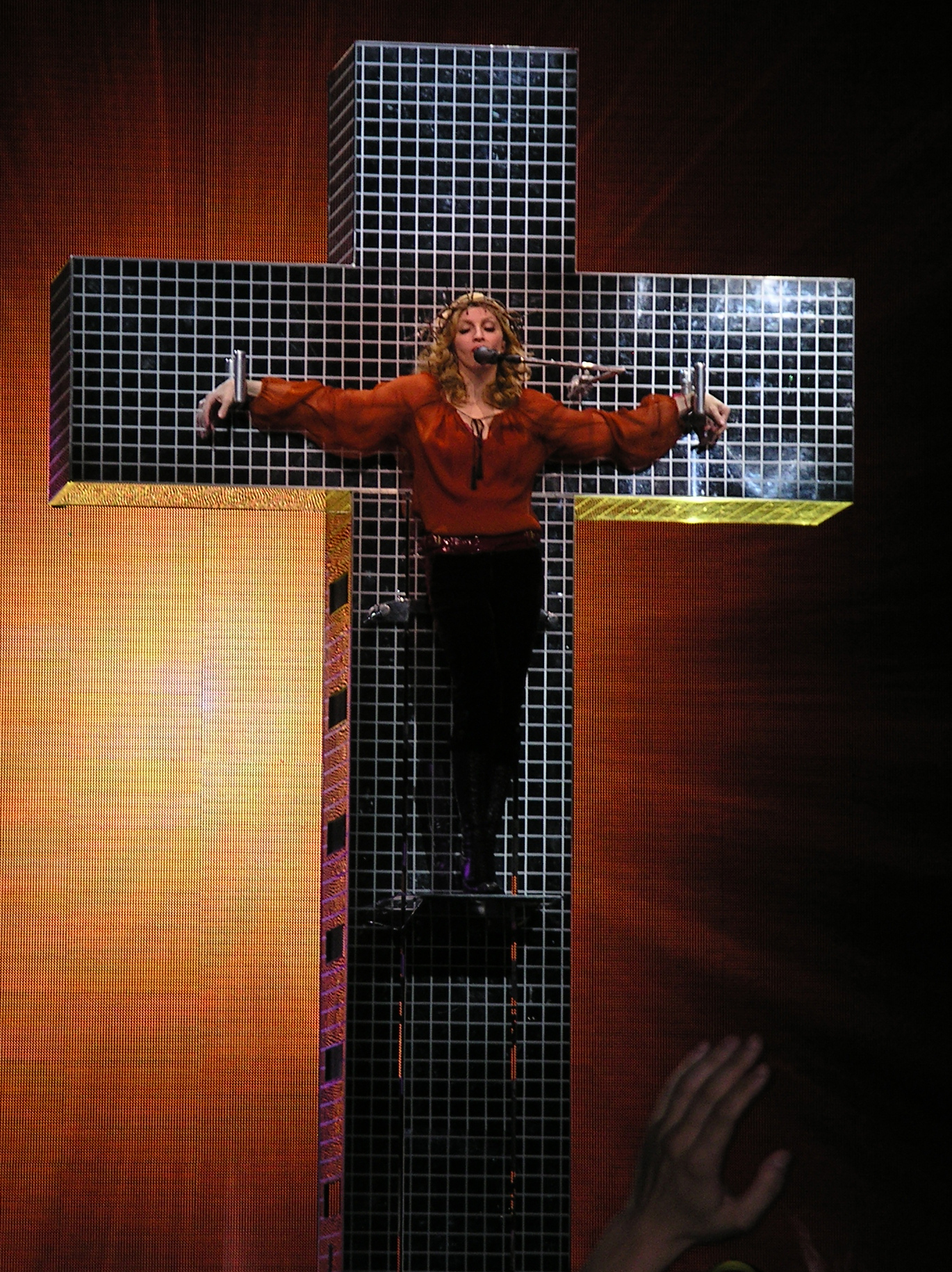
The crucifixion-themed performance of "Live to Tell" drew widespread criticism from both religious groups and music critics.

The tour's performance of "Live to Tell" (1986) drew strong backlash from religious groups, as Madonna appeared wearing a crown of thorns, simulating a crucifixion, while a screen behind her displayed a running tally of 12 million African children orphaned by AIDS. In Germany, prosecutors in Düsseldorf considered blasphemy charges, and Protestant bishop Margot Käßmann criticized the act as a publicity stunt, urging the public to "ignore" the singer. In Russia, the Orthodux Church and the Federation of Jewish Communities of Russia (FJCR) condemned the performance as immoral and called for a boycott of her Moscow concert.

The Rome performance, staged at the Olympic Stadium near the Vatican, was met with condemnation from multiple faith leaders. Cardinal Ersilio Tonini called it a "scandal created on purpose,” while the head of Italy's Muslim World League said, "We deplore it". Riccardo Pacifici, of Rome's Jewish community, called it "disrespectful", especially in a city of such religious significance. In the UK, the Catholic Church said believers would find it offensive, calling the use of the crucifixion a "banal perversion" of a sacred event. Others defended the act, including a North Denver pastor who praised it as "powerful and very reverent", adding that it drew attention to "12 million children who are currently orphaned". Madonna stood by the performance, stating that Jesus would not be offended by “the message I’m trying to send,” and later issued a statement reading:

I am very grateful that my show was so well received all over the world. But there seems to be many misinterpretations about my appearance on the cross and I wanted to explain it myself once and for all. There is a segment in my show where three of my dancers "confess" or share harrowing experiences from their childhood that they ultimately overcame. My "confession" follows and takes place on a Crucifix that I ultimately come down from. This is not a mocking of the church. It is no different than a person wearing a Cross or "Taking Up the Cross" as it says in the Bible. My performance is neither anti-Christian, sacrilegious or blasphemous. Rather, it is my plea to the audience to encourage mankind to help one another and to see the world as a unified whole. I believe in my heart that if Jesus were alive today he would be doing the same thing.

My specific intent is to bring attention to the millions of children in Africa who are dying every day, and are living without care, without medicine and without hope. I am asking people to open their hearts and minds to get involved in whatever way they can. The song ends with a quote from the Bible's Book of Matthew: "For I was hungry and you gave me food. I was naked and you gave me clothing. I was sick and you took care of me and God replied, 'Whatever you did for the least of my brothers ... you did it to me.'"

Please do not pass judgment without seeing my show".

Despite widespread media attention, critical reception of the "Live to Tell" performance was largely lukewarm to negative. Leslie Gray Streeter, who otherwise praised the show, felt it "slowed down, in an unsatisfying way", calling the number "preachy". The Mercury News' Marian Liu wrote that while visually striking, the staging offered "nothing new" to the music world. Newsday described it as one of the show's "few dull points", and Rick Massimo from The Providence Journal cited it as part of the same disjointed "jump-cut philosophy" that had hindered the Re-Invention Tour. Greg Kot observed that crucifixion imagery had lost its shock value, stating, "[Crucifixion] just isn't what it used to be in the Shock and Awe department".

Several critics questioned Madonna's sincerity. Ed Gonzalez called it the concert's "one serious moral lapse" while Chris Willman compared her attempt to "channel global suffering" to imitating Bono. The East Bay Times said the segment was, "as deep as a bumper sticker", and criticized its technical flaws, noting the sound "nearly obliterated the effect of a song that's so much better when standing quietly alone". Eric R. Danton dismissed the scene as "more funny than controversial", likening it to a "press conference from Calvary as imagined by Monty Python". The Philadelphia Inquirer described it as "disappointingly static" and a "most desperate attempt to shock". A rare positive take came from Wales Online, which called it a "powerful" rendition.

== Broadcast and recording ==
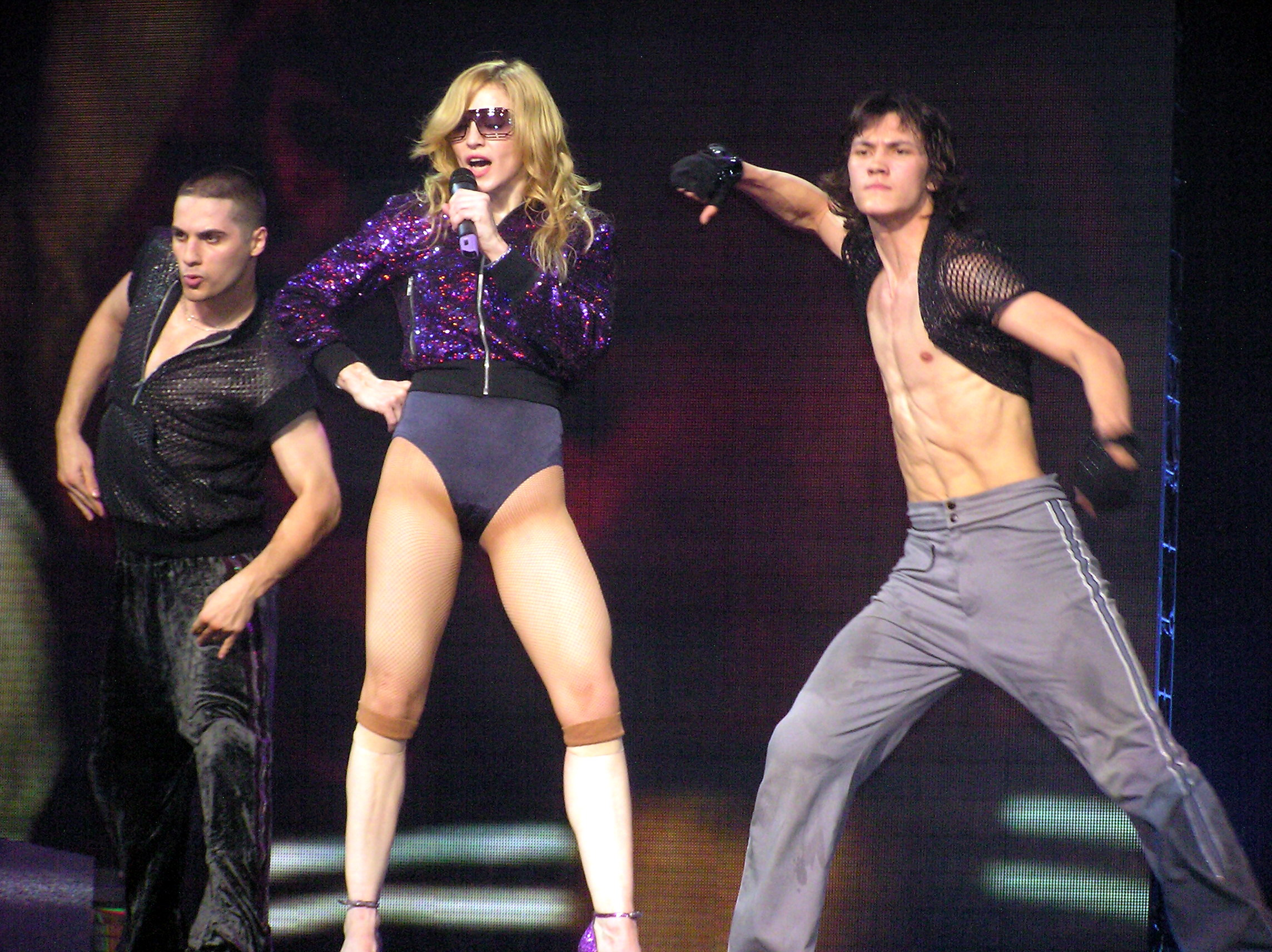
Madonna performing "Hung Up", the concert's finale.

On July 21, 2006, Access Hollywood reported that NBC would air a special featuring the concerts at the Wembley Arena —Madonna's first collaboration with the network. NBC executive Kevin Reilly called it a "big event for television", stating, "Madonna is one of the greatest artists of our time". However, the planned broadcast drew controversy when the Catholic League urged NBC to omit the crucifixion segment of "Live to Tell". Reilly initially defended including the scene, noting Madonna "felt strongly about [the performance]", and that the network did not find it inappropriate. Ultimately, the number was edited using alternate camera angles to avoid showing the singer on the cross. Madonna: The Confessions Tour Live from London aired on November 22, 2006, but received low ratings, finishing fourth in its time slot.

The broadcast was later released as a live album and DVD on January 30, 2007, titled The Confessions Tour. It received generally positive reviews, with AllMusic's Stephen Thomas Erlewine praising its cohesive, stylized production. The album peaked at number fifteen on the Billboard 200 and won Best Music Film at the 50th Annual Grammy Awards. In Singapore, Malaysia, and parts of East Asia, the release was banned due to the controversy surrounding the "Live to Tell" number. On October 1, 2008, Guy Oseary released Madonna: Confessions, a photography book documenting the tour's visual themes; all proceeds benefited Raising Malawi, Madonna's charitable foundation.

== Set list ==
Set list, samples and notes adapted per Madonna's official website, the notes and track listing of The Confessions Tour, and additional sources.

Act 1: Equestrian

1. "Future Lovers" / "I Feel Love"
2. "Get Together"
3. "Like a Virgin"
4. "Jump"
5. "Confessions" (Dancers interlude; contains elements of "Live to Tell")

Act 2: Bedouin

6. "Live to Tell"
7. "Forbidden Love"
8. "Isaac"
9. "Sorry"
10. "Like It or Not"
11. "Sorry" (Remix; interlude)

Act 3: Never Mind the Bollocks

12. "I Love New York"
13. "Ray of Light"
14. "Let It Will Be"
15. "Drowned World/Substitute for Love"
16. "Paradise (Not for Me)"

Act 4: Disco

17. "The Duke Mixes the Hits" (Video interlude; contains elements of "Borderline", "Erotica", "Dress You Up", "Holiday", and "Disco Inferno")
18. "Music" (Contains elements of "Disco Inferno" and "Where's The Party")
19. "Erotica" / "You Thrill Me"
20. "La Isla Bonita"
21. "Lucky Star" (Contains elements of "Gimme! Gimme! Gimme! (A Man After Midnight)", and "Hung Up")
22. "Hung Up" (Contains elements of "Lucky Star")

Notes

- In Moscow, Madonna sang "Give Peace a Chance" (1969)

== Shows ==
List of concerts
Date (2006)	City	Country	Venue	Opening act	Attendance (Tickets sold / available)	Revenue
May 21	Inglewood	United States	The Forum	—N/a	40,044 / 40,044	$7,686,380
May 23	Inglewood	United States	The Forum	—N/a	40,044 / 40,044	$7,686,380
May 24	Inglewood	United States	The Forum	—N/a	40,044 / 40,044	$7,686,380
May 27	Las Vegas	United States	MGM Grand Garden Arena	—N/a	27,528 / 27,528	$7,257,750
May 28	Las Vegas	United States	MGM Grand Garden Arena	—N/a	27,528 / 27,528	$7,257,750
May 30	San Jose	United States	HP Pavilion	—N/a	27,024 / 27,024	$4,761,555
May 31	San Jose	United States	HP Pavilion	—N/a	27,024 / 27,024	$4,761,555
June 3	Los Angeles	United States	Staples Center	—N/a	14,183 / 14,183	$2,804,583
June 5	Fresno	United States	Save Mart Center	—N/a	20,154 / 20,154	$3,749,800
June 6	Fresno	United States	Save Mart Center	—N/a	20,154 / 20,154	$3,749,800
June 8	Glendale	United States	Glendale Arena	—N/a	28,820 / 28,820	$4,890,090
June 10	Glendale	United States	Glendale Arena	—N/a	28,820 / 28,820	$4,890,090
June 14	Chicago	United States	United Center	—N/a	52,000 / 52,000	$9,271,790
June 15	Chicago	United States	United Center	—N/a	52,000 / 52,000	$9,271,790
June 18	Chicago	United States	United Center	—N/a	52,000 / 52,000	$9,271,790
June 19	Chicago	United States	United Center	—N/a	52,000 / 52,000	$9,271,790
June 21	Montreal	Canada	Bell Centre	—N/a	34,940 / 34,940	$5,670,150
June 22	Montreal	Canada	Bell Centre	—N/a	34,940 / 34,940	$5,670,150
June 25	Hartford	United States	Hartford Civic Center	—N/a	21,558 / 21,558	$3,451,235
June 26	Hartford	United States	Hartford Civic Center	—N/a	21,558 / 21,558	$3,451,235
June 28	New York City	United States	Madison Square Garden	—N/a	91,841 / 91,841 (Note: This score data covers all six shows in New York City's Madison Square Garden on June 28, 29, July 2, 3, 18 and 19, respectively)	$16,507,855
June 29	New York City	United States	Madison Square Garden	—N/a	91,841 / 91,841	$16,507,855
July 2	New York City	United States	Madison Square Garden	—N/a	91,841 / 91,841	$16,507,855
July 3	New York City	United States	Madison Square Garden	—N/a	91,841 / 91,841	$16,507,855
July 6	Boston	United States	TD Banknorth Garden	—N/a	36,741 / 36,741	$6,337,115
July 9	Boston	United States	TD Banknorth Garden	—N/a	36,741 / 36,741	$6,337,115
July 10	Boston	United States	TD Banknorth Garden	—N/a	36,741 / 36,741	$6,337,115
July 12	Philadelphia	United States	Wachovia Center	—N/a	29,749 / 29,749	$4,639,775
July 13	Philadelphia	United States	Wachovia Center	—N/a	29,749 / 29,749	$4,639,775
July 16	Atlantic City	United States	Boardwalk Hall	—N/a	12,322 / 12,322	$3,246,100
July 18	New York City	United States	Madison Square Garden	—N/a		
July 19	New York City	United States	Madison Square Garden	—N/a		
July 22	Miami	United States	American Airlines Arena	—N/a	30,410 / 30,410	$5,368,485
July 23	Miami	United States	American Airlines Arena	—N/a	30,410 / 30,410	$5,368,485
July 30	Cardiff	Wales	Millennium Stadium	Paul Oakenfold	55,795 / 55,795	$7,788,845
August 1	London	England	Wembley Arena	—N/a	86,061 / 86,061 (Note: This score data covers all eight shows in London's Wembley Arena on August 1, 3, 9, 10, 12, 13, 15 and 16, respectively)	$22,090,582
August 3	London	England	Wembley Arena	—N/a	86,061 / 86,061	$22,090,582
August 6	Rome	Italy	Stadio Olimpico	Paul Oakenfold	63,054 / 63,054	$5,268,886
August 9	London	England	Wembley Arena	—N/a		
August 10	London	England	Wembley Arena	—N/a		
August 12	London	England	Wembley Arena	—N/a		
August 13	London	England	Wembley Arena	—N/a		
August 15	London	England	Wembley Arena	—N/a		
August 16	London	England	Wembley Arena	—N/a		
August 20	Düsseldorf	Germany	LTU Arena	Paul Oakenfold	44,744 / 44,744	$5,926,105
August 22	Hanover	Germany	AWD-Arena	Paul Oakenfold	39,871 / 39,871	$5,218,985
August 24	Horsens	Denmark	Forum Horsens Arena	Paul Oakenfold	85,232 / 85,232	$11,435,199
August 27	Paris	France	Palais Omnisports de Paris-Bercy	—N/a	67,758 / 67,758	$9,145,832
August 28	Paris	France	Palais Omnisports de Paris-Bercy	—N/a	67,758 / 67,758	$9,145,832
August 30	Paris	France	Palais Omnisports de Paris-Bercy	—N/a	67,758 / 67,758	$9,145,832
August 31	Paris	France	Palais Omnisports de Paris-Bercy	—N/a	67,758 / 67,758	$9,145,832
September 3	Amsterdam	Netherlands	Amsterdam Arena	Paul Oakenfold	102,330 / 102,330	$11,783,254
September 4	Amsterdam	Netherlands	Amsterdam Arena	Paul Oakenfold	102,330 / 102,330	$11,783,254
September 6	Prague	Czech Republic	Sazka Arena	—N/a	37,666 / 38,342	$5,861,668
September 7	Prague	Czech Republic	Sazka Arena	—N/a	37,666 / 38,342	$5,861,668
September 12 (Note: The concert of September 12, 2006 at the Luzhniki Stadium in Moscow was originally scheduled to be performed at the Sparrow Hills the day earlier, but was moved to the Luzhniki Stadium due to security concerns and out of respect for the victims of the terrorist attacks in the United States that had happened five years earlier.)	Moscow	Russia	Luzhniki Stadium	Paul Oakenfold	37,939 / 37,939	$5,548,998
September 16	Osaka	Japan	Osaka Dome	—N/a	50,623 / 50,623	$7,379,553
September 17	Osaka	Japan	Osaka Dome	—N/a	50,623 / 50,623	$7,379,553
September 20	Tokyo	Japan	Tokyo Dome	—N/a	71,231 / 71,231	$11,463,877
September 21	Tokyo	Japan	Tokyo Dome	—N/a	71,231 / 71,231	$11,463,877
Total					1,209,593 / 1,210,294 (99%)	$194,554,447

== Personnel ==
Adapted from the Confessions Tour program.

=== Band ===
- Madonna – creator, vocals, guitar
- Donna De Lory - vocals
- Nicki Richards - vocals
- Yitzhak Sinwani - additional vocals
- Stuart Price - musical director, keyboards, programmer
- Marcus Brown - keyboards
- Monte Pittman - guitar
- Steve Sidelnyk - drums

=== Dancers ===
- Addie Yungmee-Schilling-George - dance captain
- Jason Young - dance captain
- Charmaine Jordan - dancer
- Daniel "Cloud" Campos - dancer
- Leroy Barnes Jr. - dancer
- Levi Meeuwenberg - dancer
- Mihran Kirakosian - dancer
- Reshma Gajjar - dancer
- Sofia Boutella - dancer
- Steve Neste - dancer
- Tamara Levinson - dancer
- William Charlemoine - dancer
- Sébastien Foucan - parkour
- Victor Lopez - parkour

=== Choreographers ===
- Jamie King - choreographer
- Richmond and Anthony Talauega - choreographers
- RJ Durell - choreographer
- Liz Imperio - choreographer
- Alison Faulk - choreographer
- Fred Tallaksen - roller skate choreographer
- April Corle - roller skate choreographer assistant
- Ralph Montejo - choreographer
- Boppendre - choreographer
- Laurie Ann Gibson - choreographer
- Gabriel Castillo - choreographer

=== Wardrobe ===
- Jean-Paul Gaultier - designer
- Arianne Phillips - designer

=== Crew ===
- Angela Becker - manager
- Guy Oseary - manager
- Arthur Fogel - tour producer
- Liz Rosenberg - publicist
- Jamie King - creative director
- Chris Lamb - production director
- Gina Brookee - make-up artist
- Andy LeCompte - hair stylist
- Giovanni Bianco - art direction, graphic design
- Steven Klein - tourbook photography, video projection
- Annika Aschberg - photography
- Johan Renck - "Hung Up" video stills director
- Jamie King - "Sorry" video stills director
- Christian Lamb - video projection director
- Dustin Robertson - video projection director
- Jeff Bertuch - Lighting FOH Tech

== See also ==
- List of highest-grossing concert tours by women
