= Nobody Knows Me =

2003 single by Madonna

Promotional single by Madonna

from the album American Life
- A-side: "Nothing Fails"
- Released: October 15, 2003
- Recorded: 2002
- Studio: Olympic Recording Studios
- Genre: Dance; electroclash; techno
- Length: 4:39
- Label: Maverick; Warner Bros.
- Songwriters: Madonna; Mirwais Ahmadzaï
- Producers: Madonna; Mirwais Ahmadzaï

"Nobody Knows Me" is a song by American singer-songwriter Madonna. The song was written and produced by Madonna and Mirwais Ahmadzaï for her ninth studio album American Life (2003). It was released as a promotional single in the United States on October 15, 2003, with a remixed version appearing on the remix compilation Remixed & Revisited (2003). "Nobody Knows Me" carries on the main theme of American Life, with its usage of negative tones on the songs. It is a dance and electronic song, with vocoder effects, spacey synths and a bubbly bass, and lyrically, Madonna rejects tabloid culture's "social disease", denouncing both TV and magazines.

The song received generally favorable reviews from music critics, with many of whom calling it a highlight from American Life. Four remixes were released in club stations around the United States, with one of them peaking at number four on the US Hot Dance Club Play chart. The song, along with "Nothing Fails", topped the US Hot Dance Singles Sales chart and also charted on the ARIA Club Tracks in Australia. Madonna did a performance of the song alone on stage on her Re-Invention World Tour in 2004. It was also used as a video interlude on the MDNA Tour in 2012, showing Madonna's face morphed with a number of famous figures. French right-wing Marine Le Pen sued Madonna for superimposing a swastika and Adolf Hitler's face with hers.

== Background ==
American Life became Madonna's final studio album with Maverick Records, and marked the end of an eleven-year recording history with the label. In an interview with VH1, Madonna discussed her motivations behind the record discussing her 20 years in the industry and stating that "material things" were unimportant, stating "I look back at the 20 years behind me and I realized that a lot of things that I'd valued weren't important", in response to the non-materialistic themes of the record. The album has been deemed by some as a concept album featuring political themes based around the United States. "[The songs] are examining things I valued and things I found myself worrying about, caring too much about, and realizing that those things aren't important and wanting to get out from underneath that cloud, the world of illusion", Madonna stated. According to Lucy O'Brien, author of Madonna: Like an Icon, the main concept of American Life was about "nothing". This was evident in the titles of the songs like "Nobody Knows Me", usage of "no" in "Love Profusion", as well as "Nothing Fails". Usage of the negative tone led Madonna to be sarcastic on people's assumptions about her and emphasize about her knowledge of romantic love. O'Brien described the concept of the album and the song:

"If Like a Prayer was her divorce album, American Life is her psychoanalysis. She even name checks Sigmund Freud and throws out countless questions. Who am I? Where am I going? What does it all mean? Much of the album is suffused with sarcasm: right from the disaffected ennui of the title track to the stroppiness of 'Nobody Knows Me', Madonna is kicking against the claustrophobic effect of celebrity worship."

A remix of the song was featured in Madonna's 2003 compilation Remixed & Revisited. Other remixes by Peter Rauhofer, Mount Sims and Above & Beyond were serviced to dance clubs. In 2004, Madonna released a book entitled Nobody Knows Me which was available exclusively for one month only via Madonna's official website for $24 each. It included 52 pages of rare and unseen shots "commented by an Icon and her angels".

== Recording and composition ==
"Nobody Knows Me" (2003)
27-second sample of "Nobody Knows Me" which Madonna rejects tabloid culture's "social disease", while featuring repeated echo shifts of "nobody knows me" during the chorus.

"Nobody Knows Me" was written and produced by Madonna and Mirwais Ahmadzaï. The recording sessions for American Life started at late 2001, then was put on hold as Madonna filmed Swept Away in Malta and starred in the West End play Up for Grabs. She returned to the Olympic Recording Studios in late 2002 and finished off the sessions. The mixing for the track was done by Mark "Spike" Stent at the Westlake Recording Studios in West Hollywood, California, while Tim Young did the mastering of the song at Metropolis Studios in London. Ahmadzaï played the guitars, and also did the necessary programming. Two machines were used for the vocal editing in songs like "Hollywood" and "Nobody Knows Me". Madonna preferred the Antares Auto-Tune plug in, while Ahmadzaï chose an AMS pitch shifter. Madonna chose Auto-Tune because she wanted "Nobody Knows Me" to have a more dance-like feel to it, although Ahmadzaï was against it.

"Nobody Knows Me" has vocoder effects, spacey synths, bubbly bass. IGN Music's Spencer D. described that the song blips, glurgs, and shuffles with a Jetsons' styled disco ebb and flow and sounds like as an outtake from Music (2000). It begins with vocoder treated vocals over a bleeping synth, on a minor chord. Heavy drum hits stress the melody during the verse. "Nobody Knows Me" is written in common time with a moderately fast tempo of 120 beats per minute. It is composed in the key of C major with Madonna's voice spanning from B_{3} to C_{5}. The song follows a basic sequence of C–Am–D–Am–A–E as its chord progression. Lyrically, she rejects tabloid culture's "social disease", denouncing both TV and magazines. The chorus features repeated echo shifts of "nobody knows me" while she ponders thoughts like, "It's no good when you're misunderstood, but why should I care what the world thinks of me?". O'Brien described it as a trancey track with a sense of childlike defiant lyrics, dismissing critics who have no knowledge of her "jealously guarded inner self".

== Critical reception ==
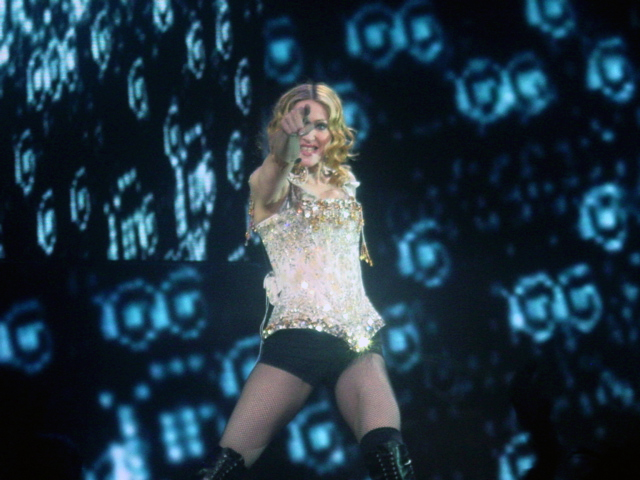
Madonna performing "Nobody Knows Me" during the Re-Invention World Tour in 2004

The song received generally favorable reviews from music critics. Stephen Thomas Erlewine from AllMusic praised the song as one of the best tracks of the album, calling it "infectious". Sean O'Brien from The People praised "Nobody Knows Me" as "the best song of the album" and her "one of her best ever". He also stated that the song "shows why Madonna is [the] queen of pop". Jon Pareles from The New York Times considered it as the album's most danceable song. Lucy O'Brien in her book Madonna: Like an Icon, called the song "dazed-sounding". Metro Times described Ahmadzai's programming as "by far the best thing on the album". James Hannaham from Spin compared "Nobody Knows Me" to Donna Summer's "I Feel Love", and deemed it as a highlight from the album. Alan Braidwood from BBC Music felt that the song was "insane" with its electronic, chaotic, fast and manic pounding synths. "There is so much going on here several it'll take several plays to really get it, but it's ace." Ken Tucker from Entertainment Weekly described "Nobody Knows Me" as the "downright thrilling" and "deploys a shrewd little form-versus-content paradox".

Spence D. from IGN Music commented that the song is the coolest song on the album up to this point. Paul Rees from Q magazine complemented the track as a "conventional rock song, filled with drama, darkness and surprises". USA Today's Edna Gunderson said that the "funkified" synth-pop of "Nobody Knows Me" attests to Madonna's "undiminished" skills as a shrewd pop composer. Yahoo! Music's Dan Genoe commented that Madonna has a personality crisis in the song. Jessica Winter from The Village Voice gave the song a mixed review, writing: "It mutes slightly the slaphappy beats of Mirwais's own club hit "Disco Science" to make vague digs at the press and defensively vow self-improvement. Madonna's voice is mixed and diced into baby gurgles, which might have been cute if it weren't so redundant." John Payne from LA Weekly deduced that even within the synth sounds of the song, he could see "real feeling deeply ingrained in this particular icon. 'Why should I care what the world thinks of me?' That is, yes, she does care what the world thinks of her. She says she’ll just withdraw from the public eye, ’cause who needs this, huh?" Conversely, Rikky Rooksby, author of The Complete Guide to the Music of Madonna, gave a negative review saying that "Nobody Knows Me" might be the silliest track that Madonna had ever recorded.

== Chart performance ==
The song, along with "Nothing Fails", topped the Hot Dance Singles Sales while the Peter Rauhofer remix peaked at number four on the Hot Dance Club Play chart. According to Fred Bronson, the single release of the remixes of the song debuted at number-one on the Hot Singles Sales and Hot Dance Single Sales chart, on the issue dated December 27, 2003, the same week it also moved up to the top-twenty of the Dance Club Play chart. "Me Against the Music" by Britney Spears, on which Madonna was featured, and "Nobody Knows Me", both were also present in the top-twenty, making Madonna the only artist to have three songs within the top-twenty on the chart simultaneously. At the year-end Hot Dance Singles Sales recap, "Nothing Fails / Nobody Knows Me" was at number two position, while "Me Against the Music" and "Love Profusion" was at numbers one and three respectively. Billboard reported that Madonna was the first artist in its chart history to have the top three Dance Sales song. In Australia, the Peter Rauhofer/Above & Beyond Remix debuted at number 80 on the ARIA Club Tracks, peaking at number 49 the next week.

== Live performances ==
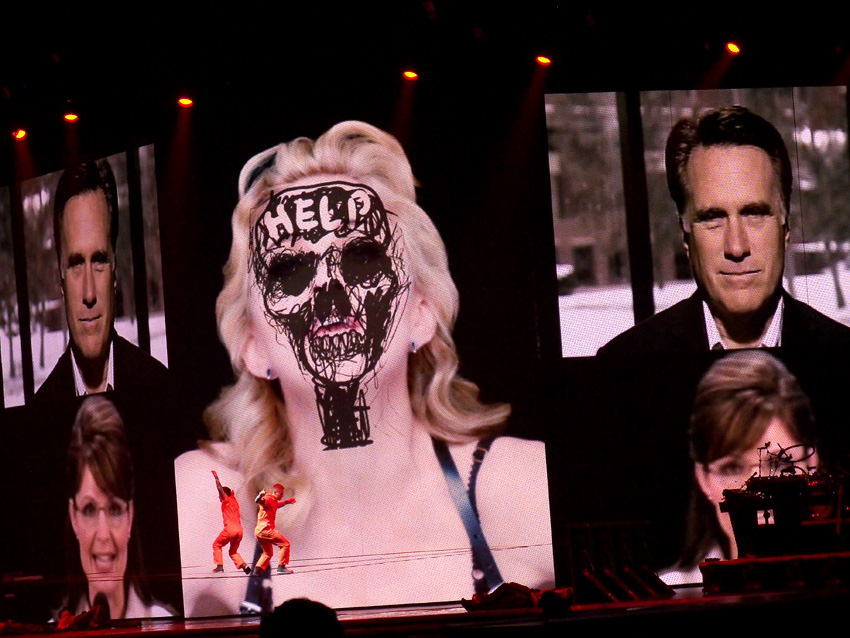
Dancers practicing slacklining during the video interlude of "Nobody Knows Me", which morphed Madonna's face with a number of famous figures, on the MDNA Tour in 2012

Madonna performed the song during the 2004 Re-Invention World Tour, as the second song on the opening segment of the show. "Nobody Knows Me" was rehearsed with the Peter Rauhofer's Private Life remix. According to Dirk Timmerman, author of Madonna Live! Secret Re-inventions and Confessions on Tour, Madonna lip-synched the performance. During this section, the singer wore a jewel encrusted corset, created by designer Christian Lacroix. After the opening number, "Vogue", she started an energetic version of the song, on a conveyor belt with some laser light words appearing on the backdrop screens behind her. It also features a giant catwalk lowered from the ceiling. After this performance, she performed "Frozen" alone on stage. The performance of "Nobody Knows Me" was included in the I'm Going to Tell You a Secret live album and documentary.

The song was later added as a video interlude on the MDNA Tour in 2012, as a tribute to Tyler Clementi and other teens who had committed suicide due to bullying. The film, which was created by Swedish director Johan Söderberg, morphed Madonna's face with a number of famous figures, including then-Chinese President Hu Jintao, US Republican former vice presidential candidate Sarah Palin and Pope Benedict XVI. The face of French far right politician Marine Le Pen appeared on the screen with a swastika superimposed on her forehead, before it morphed into the face of Adolf Hitler. Socialist French government spokesperson Najat Vallaud-Belkacem had also expressed her disappointment. However, Madonna kept the video unchanged on this date, prompting Le Pen to file a lawsuit against her. A spokesman for Le Pen said a lawsuit for "public insult" would be lodged with the Paris courts in the next few days. Madonna responded to the lawsuit saying "I know that I made a certain Marine Le Pen very angry with me. And it's not my intention to make enemies." She later explained in an interview with Brazilian network Rede Globo, that the sequence was about "intolerance that we human beings have for one another. And how much we judge people before knowing them. That's why it's done in the song 'Nobody Knows Me.'" During her concert in Nice, France, the swastika was removed and was replaced by a question mark. The performance was included on Madonna's fourth live album, MDNA World Tour.

== Formats and track listings ==
- "Nothing Fails" – US CD maxi-single
1. "Nothing Fails" (Peter Rauhofer's Classic House Mix) – 8:24
2. "Nothing Fails" (Nevins Big Room Rock Mix) – 6:44
3. "Nothing Fails" (Tracy Young's Underground Mix) – 7:29
4. "Nothing Fails" (Nevins Global Dub) – 7:45
5. "Nothing Fails" (Jackie's In Love In The Club Mix) – 7:28
6. "Nobody Knows Me" (Peter Rauhofer's Private Life Part 1) – 8:07
7. "Nobody Knows Me" (Above & Beyond 12" Mix) – 8:45
8. "Nobody Knows Me" (Mount Sims Italo Kiss Mix) – 5:26
- US promo vinyl single
1. "Nobody Knows Me" (Peter Rauhofer's Private Life Mix Part 1) – 8:07
2. "Nobody Knows Me" (Mount Sims Old School Mix) – 4:46
3. "Nobody Knows Me" (Above & Beyond 12" Mix) – 8:50
4. "Nobody Knows Me" (Mount Sims Italo Kiss Mix) – 5:25
- Digital video single
1. "Music" (Live) – 2:31
2. "Nobody Knows Me" (Live) – 3:36

== Credits and personnel ==
- Madonna – lead vocals, background vocals, songwriter, producer
- Mirwais Ahmadzaï – songwriter, producer, guitars, programming
- Tim Young – audio mastering
- Mark "Spike" Stent – audio mixing

Credits for "Nobody Knows Me" are adapted from American Life liner notes.

== Charts ==
=== Weekly charts ===
Chart (2003)	Peak position
Australian Dance (ARIA)	49
US Dance Club Songs (Billboard)	4
US Dance Singles Sales (Billboard) along with "Nothing Fails"	1

=== Year-end charts ===
Chart (2004)	Position
US Dance Singles Sales (Billboard)	2
