= American Life =

2003 studio album by Madonna

Studio album by Madonna
- Released: April 21, 2003
- Recorded: 2001–2003
- Studios: Westlake (Los Angeles); Olympic (London)
- Genres: Folktronica; Eurotechno; electroclash
- Length: 49:39
- Labels: Maverick; Warner Bros.
- Producers: Madonna; Mirwais Ahmadzaï

Madonna chronology
GHV2 (2001)	American Life (2003)	Remixed & Revisited (2003)

Singles from American Life
- 1. "American Life" Released: March 24, 2003; 2. "Hollywood" Released: May 27, 2003; 3. "Nothing Fails" Released: October 27, 2003; 4. "Love Profusion" Released: December 8, 2003

American Life is the ninth studio album by American singer Madonna. It was released on April 21, 2003, by Maverick and Warner Bros. Records. The album, produced by the singer and Mirwais Ahmadzaï, features references to many parts of American culture. The album is a concept album, with themes panning the American Dream and materialism. These themes reject the reputation Madonna held in the 1980s, earned by her 1984 Billboard Hot 100 number-two hit, "Material Girl". American Life is a folktronica and eurotechno album, influenced by acoustic music.

American Life received mixed reviews upon release; critics found the album confusing and "about Madonna". Critics also found it "difficult to listen to" due to its awkward and brash production in some songs. However, retrospective reviews of the album have been much more positive, particularly for its lyrics. American Life reached number one in 14 countries, including Canada, France, Germany, Italy, the United Kingdom and the United States, and charted within the top five of most markets. The Recording Industry Association of America (RIAA) and the British Phonographic Industry (BPI) both certified the album Platinum in recognition of one million shipments in the United States, and 300,000 shipments in the United Kingdom, respectively. It became the 32nd-best-selling album of 2003 and has sold five million copies worldwide. American Life garnered two nominations at the 46th Grammy Awards in 2004.

Four singles were released from American Life. The title track was released as the lead single to a generally negative critical reception, with Blender naming it the ninth-worst song of all time. It charted at number 37 in the United States, while it entered the top ten in most markets, peaking at number two in the United Kingdom. A controversial music video was pulled after scenes of war and violence were criticized, which led to an edited version being released. Its following singles were "Hollywood", "Nothing Fails", and "Love Profusion", with the latter two reaching number one in Spain. All four singles peaked at number one on the Billboard Dance Club Songs chart. Preceding the album release, "Die Another Day" was released as a single to promote the James Bond film of the same name, and peaked at number eight on the US Hot 100 and number three on the UK Singles Chart.

Madonna promoted the album during a small promotional tour in April and May 2003. At the 2003 MTV Video Music Awards, she performed alongside Britney Spears, Christina Aguilera and Missy Elliott a medley of "Like a Virgin" and "Hollywood", and engaged in open-mouth kissing with Aguilera and Spears gaining great controversy and publicity. American Life was supported by Madonna's sixth tour, the Re-Invention World Tour, which was the highest-grossing tour of 2004, earning $125 million. The tour was chronicled in the documentary I'm Going to Tell You a Secret, which led to Madonna's first-ever live album of the same name.

== Background and development ==
During the early 1990s, Madonna had focused on a number of provocative releases, like the erotic pictorial book Sex, the sadomasochist-inspired album Erotica, and the erotic thriller Body of Evidence, all of which she deduced was due to "a lot of rage and anger" within herself. However, by the beginning of the new millennium, Madonna was living a calmer and more introspective life with her husband Guy Ritchie, their son Rocco, and Madonna's daughter Lourdes Leon from a previous relationship. According to biographer J. Randy Taraborrelli, the presence of Ritchie in Madonna's life had a calming effect on the singer, maturing her more and easing her temper. Concentrating on her music career, Madonna was busy throughout 2001 on her Drowned World Tour. On September 11, 2001, suicide bombers hijacked two jet airliners and crashed into the World Trade Center, resulting in the death of nearly 3,000 people. The event had a profound effect on American society, with the cultural mood being bleakness and paranoia. People, including Madonna, started asking questions about their culture and the American Dream, which had been a long-lasting ideal for many. When Madonna started working on her ninth studio album, American Life, she wanted answers to her queries and an appropriate response to the 9/11 disaster and the ensuing Iraq war of 2003. She believed that the ensuing months with the war would lead to a politically charged atmosphere throughout the country, and wanted to express that in the record.

Like her 2000 studio album, Music, Madonna enlisted the help of French DJ and producer Mirwais Ahmadzaï. Always interested in adapting herself and her music to the contemporary compositions, Madonna was inspired by 100th Window (2003) by Massive Attack and Lost Horizons (2002) by Lemon Jelly. "We set out to put the two worlds of acoustic and electronic music together," said Madonna, adding "It is another step on, but I've never wanted to repeat myself. I don't ever want to repeat myself or make the same record twice." American Life became Madonna's final studio album with Maverick Records, and marked the end of an eleven-year recording history with the label. In an interview with VH1 titled Madonna Speaks, the singer discussed her 20 years in the music industry, and revealed her motivations behind American Life, about "material things" being unimportant. "I have lots of 'material' things and I've had lots of beliefs about things and what's important, and I look back at the 20 years behind me and I realized that a lot of things that I'd valued weren't important", she concluded. Discussing her thoughts on the conception of the album, she told Q magazine that through her 20 years of being in the entertainment industry, she would have a correct opinion on fame and fortune and its perils, which would be the base of the album.

== Writing and inspiration ==
When Madonna started writing the songs on the album, she was inspired by different situations, like having guitar lessons and getting an idea, or sometimes Ahmadzaï would send over a rough demo to her without the basic chord progression. The songs on American Life and their lyrics were developed like that. Explaining her writing process, Madonna told Q magazine that the "music has to jar my brain in terms of lyrics. Sometimes I write free verse. I have a journal and I note down ideas I get from newspapers and books". Madonna also remembered Ahmadzaï's downbeat existentialism regarding the condition of society around them, and the long discussions they had into the night, which ultimately reflected into the songwriting as anxiety they felt in their heart. American Life was deemed by some as a concept album featuring political themes based around the United States, with Madonna explaining that she felt "like America has changed over the years and that a lot of our values seem to be materially oriented and so superficial. And we all seem to be obsessed with fame just for the sake of fame, no matter what — sell your soul to the devil if that's what it takes. And we're also completely obsessed with the way we look." Madonna recalled that even she had been through such trials and those musings came out in the writing of the first three songs, the title track, "Hollywood" and "I'm So Stupid". John Norris from MTV described them as a trilogy, and an indicator of Madonna's reassessment of her life while discussing things she wishes to put behind her. Madonna partly agreed, saying that the tracks are extensions of one another, and portray her desire of giving importance to less noteworthy things, and how she could come out of that "illusion". Madonna discussed the materialistic themes of the record and her personal encounters which have led to the composition with MTV saying:

"Who better to say those things don't matter than somebody who's experienced them? [People may say], 'How can you say they don't matter? How can you say that money won't bring you happiness if you don't have a lot of money? How can you say that fame and fortune are not a guarantee for happiness and joy and fulfillment in your life?' You have to have that experience to know. 'Cause you have all those things, I've had all those things, and I've had nothing but chaos around me. So I'm just sharing what I know with the world. 'Cause I do think that we've become completely consumed with being rich and famous, our society has. And I just want to tell people, take it from me, I have all those things and none of them ever brought me one minute of happiness."

The glamorous world of Hollywood also reflected in her writing, especially in the second track of the same name. Describing it as a metaphor, Madonna said that "in Hollywood you can lose your memory and your vision of the future. You can lose everything because you can lose yourself." The beginning of the album cleared away what was not important for her, so Madonna could concentrate on the things that did matter. So, in contrast to the first three tracks, the later songs on American Life also deal with issues close to the singer's heart, like talking about her relationship with her parents on the track "Mother and Father". When Madonna was five, her mother died of breast cancer and the track was "a way of letting go of the sadness and moving on." According to Lucy O'Brien, author of Madonna: Like an Icon, another concept of American Life was about "nothingness". This was evident in the titles of the songs like "Nobody Knows Me", usage of "no" in "Love Profusion", as well as "Nothing Fails". Usage of the negative tone led Madonna to be sarcastic on people's assumptions about her and emphasize about her knowledge of romantic love. But "Nothing Fails", along with tracks "Intervention" and "X-Static Process," became the centerpiece of the album as a triptych of love songs for Ritchie. Beginning as a humble track that musician-producer Guy Sigsworth wrote for his wife, "Nothing Fails" also has lyrics by singer Jem Archer, who was asked to collaborate with Sigsworth and Madonna during the first collaborative sessions of American Life. The track is followed by the folk-inspired "Intervention" and "X-Static Process," both being reflective and emotional. Her reflective mood continued with the last track "Easy Ride," which was inspired by the imagery of a full-circle and symbolized life for the singer.

== Recording and mixing ==
The album was mostly composed and entirely produced by Madonna and Ahmadzaï. Both had previously collaborated on Madonna's studio album Music (2000). The recording sessions for American Life started in late 2001, then were put on hold as Madonna filmed Swept Away on location in Malta and Sardinia and starred in the West End play Up for Grabs. She returned to the Olympic Recording Studios and Sarm West Studios in late 2002 and finished off the sessions in London and Los Angeles in early 2003. For the instrumentation featured in some of the songs, Ahmadzaï played the guitars, and Stuart Price played the piano. Tom Hannen and Simon Changer, both of them worked as assistant engineer during the recording.

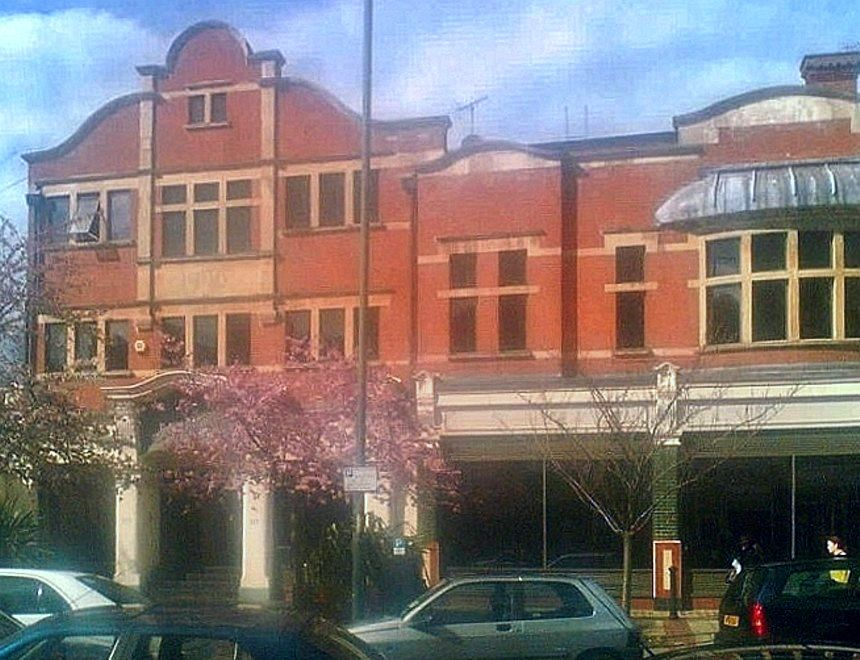
Olympic Recording Studios in London was one of the locations where American Life was recorded.

Unlike Music, Madonna had enlisted Ahmadzaï also as a songwriter on American Life; hence what transpired was Madonna's wholesale adaptation of the producer's style and sound. He explained that there are some influences from his work, but Madonna mostly wanted a minimalist structure for the album. This was beneficial for him since he did not like working with a lot of people, and hence it became a close collaboration. Since electronic music was already popular, Ahmadzaï felt that it was necessary to go back to its underground roots and focus on the songwriting, rather than the technical aspects of recording and mixing. Describing it as modified songwriting, he said that the concept "might sound simple at first, even rough. But when you pay attention, there is a lot of technology underneath". This approach was an imperative for American Life. Recorded at three different studios using Ahmadzaï's own gear along with the studio's SSL mixing consoles, the album's recording process was often laborious but was sparse in the musical arrangements of the songs. About the musical composition, Ahmadzaï told Remix magazine that they "tried to under-produce many tracks to make them sound rougher than the average international pop production. We wanted to do something totally modern and futuristic but not very apparent. You have to be very minimalist and choose every sound very carefully. Some tracks were composed in the big studio; that can be very dangerous because you can lose perspective. But all initial directions of the tracks were made in my home studio."

American Life is suffused with Ahmadzaï's characteristic production techniques, like stuttering instruments and vocals, oscillating loop tones recalling 1950s Sonar pulses, morphing vocals consisting of grunts and squeals and treatments that make the music freeze in between rhythms. The producer hoped that using stuttering would become a rage in the future world of recording. He believed that people think it is not natural to skip and stutter the music. But he used it to create a new groove. With the help of Pro Tools, he froze the audio at any point he wanted to change the rhythm of the tracks. Madonna discussed the recording of the title track stating that Ahmadzaï had encouraged her to rap spontaneously, about all the materialistic objects that she herself had been using and doing. They had an instrumental breakdown in "American Life", where the producer encouraged Madonna to add a rap about her everyday life. "Because I was always drinking soy lattes in the studio, and I drive my Mini Cooper to the studio, I was just like, 'OK, let me just talk about the things that I like'. So I went and it was just total improv [sic] and obviously it was sloppy at first, but I got out all my thoughts and then I wrote everything down that I said and then I perfected the timing of it. So it was totally spontaneous," she added.

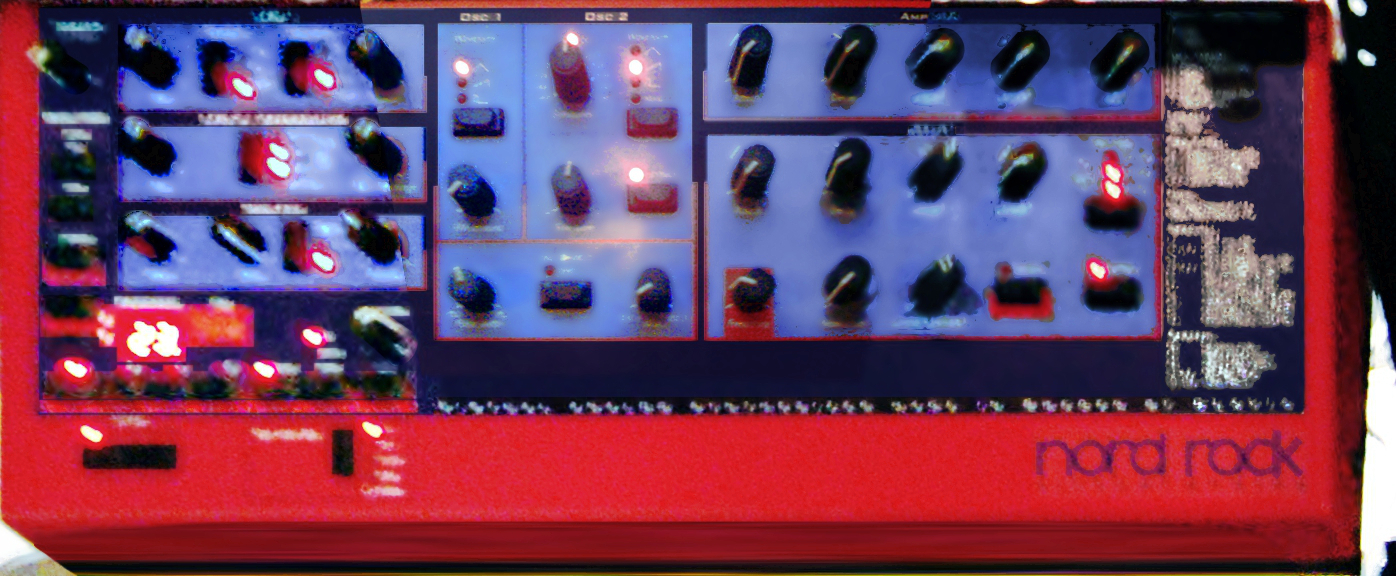
A Nord Lead synthesizer was initially used for recording "Hollywood" but Ahmadzaï faced problems with it.

For "Hollywood", he used a drum kit and percussion from an E-mu Emulator and added extra drum sounds to give the song an old, disco vibe. Wanting to have a loud bass synth sound, Ahmadzaï used a Nord Lead synthesizer with lot of filtering manipulations. But he faced problems with it, so he used a Yamaha O2R mixer. He did not want "Hollywood" to sound like the music being played at the nightclubs, so he recorded Madonna's vocals with heavy compression in her headphones. Two machines were used for the vocal editing in "Hollywood". Madonna preferred the Antares Auto-Tune plug in, while Ahmadzaï chose an AMS pitch shifter. Madonna wanted Auto-Tune because she wanted "Hollywood" to have a more dance-like feel to it, although Ahmadzaï was against it. The track "I'm So Stupid" had gentle vocals, then the singing was frozen using a Roland VP-9000. When Madonna sings "Aaaaaahhhhhh", the vocals freeze and the process sounds natural, but in reality is not. When it came to adding the beats, he experimented by programming the drums in Logic Pro and changing the timing of the beats. The producer combines different samples of songs from his own collections and keeps on trying until something new is developed. The mixing for the tracks was done by Mark "Spike" Stent at the Westlake Recording Studios at West Hollywood, California, while Tim Young mastered the songs at Metropolis Studios in London. Michael Colombier did the string arrangement with Geoff Foster acting as the strings engineer, conducting at AIR Studios.

== Composition ==
"'Mother and Father' is a way to free me from the pain caused by my mother's death, but without putting myself a medal for finding my way in life without even asking for compassion just because I went through a hard time. Neither using it as an excuse, as: 'I'm rebel because I had suffered a hard time when I was a child'. All these excuses are rubbish because in the end you have to be responsible for your own actions."

— Madonna

Slant Magazine's Sal Cinquemani stated that "Madonna couldn't possibly have intended to make a pop album. American Life is a folk album in the purest definition of the term—and it's reflected right in the title" and added that it has "an often ugly, lo-fi demo quality." Greg Kot from the Chicago Tribune called the record an "electro-folk album" with electronic beats and synthetic burps. Priya Elan of NME described the album as "folktronica", while Ben Ratliff, in his review for Rolling Stone, described the album's sound as "diluted Eurotechno." Jon Pareles, writing for The New York Times, characterized the album's sound as a "mixture of acoustic guitar-picking, ticking drum machines and swooping, buzzing synthesizer lines", adding that "The guitar signals the sincerity of a singer-songwriter, while all the gizmos add the retro catchiness of the synth-pop music now being revived under the name electroclash." "American Life", the title track, is the first song on the record. Starting with Madonna's multi-tracked voice questioning, "Am I gonna be a star", "should I change my name", the lyrics then develop into what Rikky Rooksby of The Complete Guide to the Music of Madonna states as a complaint about modern-day life. The lyrics accompany a "punchy octave synth figure" synchronized with a drum and bass beat. After three minutes of the song, Madonna performs a rap naming the people who were working for her. The second track and single "Hollywood" is introduced with sounds of tweeting birds, before an acoustic guitar starts with a four chord sequence that has been compared to songs by the band Red Hot Chili Peppers. The texture grows with addition of drums and synths, until after a minute the instrumental is pulled out, leaving just Madonna's vocals and the acoustic guitar accompaniment where she alludes to the Beatles' Norwegian Wood. During the final sequence, Madonna raps, as is featured in the first song, with the repeated phrase "Push the button". Lyrically, like the first track, it discusses American culture and greed focusing on Hollywood, California, as a place of stars and illusory dreams.

The next track "I'm So Stupid" features an introduction with a two-chord electric guitar which leads to a minor drum beat, with the guitar later changing to a three-chord. The composition throughout is generally minor, but at the 2:15 mark, different pitched synths change manically, and towards the end the synths become less prominent as the guitars become the main focus. Lyrically, the song expresses disillusionment with Madonna singing "I used to live in a fuzzy dream" and "It was just greed", also proclaiming that once she was "stupider than stupid" before stating "Everybody's stupid" towards the end of the song. The fourth track "Love Profusion" starts with another acoustic guitar introduction, with rhythm being produced by a bass drum with synth-strings added later in the song. Vocally, the line "I got you under my skin" is repeated, while a male voice acts as the backing for the track as the final words, "feel good", are performed with no backing instrumental. "Nobody Knows Me" is the fifth track, featuring vocoder treated vocals. The song is accompanied by bleeping synths and a heavy drum part. The title is repeated throughout the song as she references "social disease", which is also repeated. A recurring theme of American Life is the acoustic-guitar introduction to the songs, which is again featured in the sixth track, "Nothing Fails". The guitar is accompanied by a "light" drum section and low-pitched vocals from Madonna. The song also features a cello in the first part, and a church choir in the second part. Lyrically, the song discusses a lover who is the one, and how their meeting was not just chance. The song refers to the "tree of life" as Madonna states "I'm not religious" but she wishes to pray.

Acoustic guitars introduces the seventh track, "Intervention". It starts with a three-chord minor sequence which changes to a four-chord one during the chorus section and a bass section starts at the end of the track. Lyrically, the song is an optimistic track about how a relationship will last, as Madonna says "the road looks lonely but that's just Satan's game". "X-Static Process", the eighth track, starts once again with acoustic guitars and throughout there are vocal harmony lines in addition to an organ part. Lyrically, like the title track, it questions modern life as Madonna sings "Jesus Christ will you look at me, don't know who I'm supposed to be". "Mother and Father" is the album's ninth track, with a drum and bass beat paired with an electric guitar present in the instrumental. Lyrically, the song reflects on Madonna's childhood, including her mother's death and her father's reaction, and the effect on their relationship. The tenth track is "Die Another Day", the theme to the James Bond film of the same name, which featured dominating string and synth parts. The eleventh and final track on the album, "Easy Ride", is a heavily string-oriented song. It addresses Madonna's feelings towards old age, wanting to live forever, and coming full circle to a point in her life where she could be comfortable.

== Artwork ==
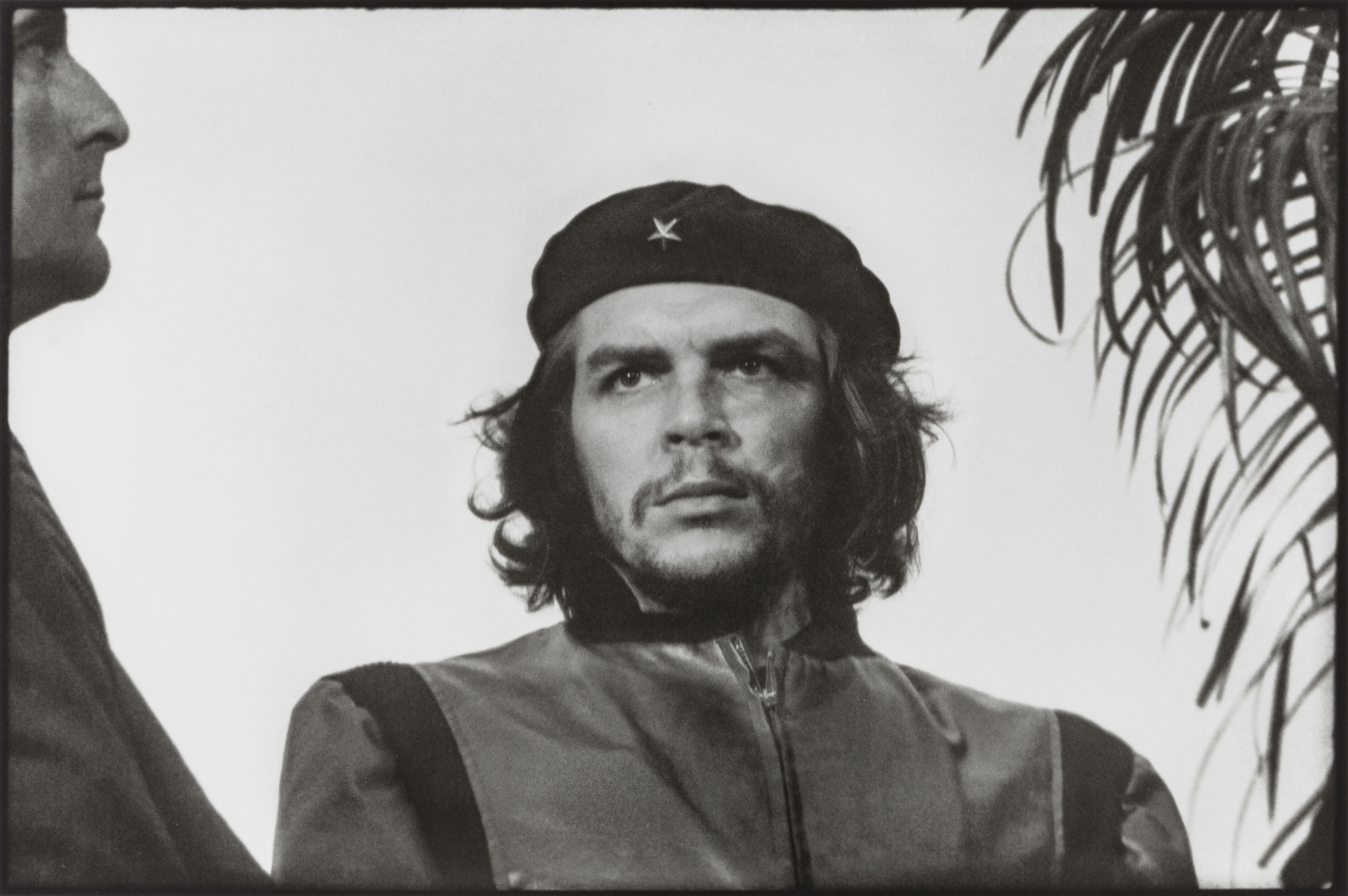
The album's cover was inspired by Guerrillero Heroico (above), a famous image of Argentine guerilla leader Che Guevara.

By 2003, Madonna suggested that she was in a revolutionary mood, which led to journalistic discussions that another image makeover would take place for her. Still recovering from the commercial disappointment of Swept Away, Madonna changed her image completely to resemble that of a fighter, with inspirations from pictures of Argentinian guerrilla leader Che Guevara. French design team M/M Paris (Michael Amzalag and Mathias Augustyniak) were responsible for the artwork of American Life. The duo are best known for their collaborations with musicians and Madonna hired the duo after discussing the concept for just six minutes. The photo shoot for the album was done by photographer Craig McDean in January 2003 at Los Angeles, and cost a reported $415,000. McDean had already worked with Madonna for the cover of Vanity Fair magazine in October 2002; this shoot had a military theme, with Madonna posing in dark green and black clothes, combat boots, and guns.

As with 1989's album Like a Prayer, Madonna's hair was dyed dark brown to signify "seriousness", and on the cover of the album Madonna wore a beret, referencing Guerrillero Heroico, a famous image of Guevara. In an interview with Veja magazine, she described Guevara as "an icon instantaneously identified with a revolution spirit. That goes for the whole album: the current moment, I feel a revolutionary state of mind". Author Santiago Fouz-Hernández wrote in his book, Madonna's Drowned Worlds: New Approaches to Her Subcultural Transformations, that the inclusion of Guevara as an inspiration for the cover was one of the many instances of Madonna incorporating Hispanic identity and the Latino subculture in her work. The album cover was also compared to an infamous 1970s photo of kidnapped newspaper heiress Patty Hearst. The cover had military-styled stenciled lettering. The title American Life is written in blood-red color and has a punk rock style. Inside the CD booklet, she wielded an Uzi submachine gun, her body in various martial art poses, spelling out her name. By late 2003, she had wiped out the military image completely, and followed with another subtle toned-down image of that of a writer and philanthropist.

== Title and release ==
In an interview with Larry King in October 2002, she said that she wanted to give the album a Hebrew name. Madonna then considered Ein Sof, which means endlessness, as a possible title for the album. However, as the months went on and the album became more of a meditation on the difficulty of leading a spiritual life in the glamour industry, the title was changed to Hollywood with Madonna saying that it was "a reflection of my state of mind and a view of the world right now". Still, she was not satisfied with the name, and finalized on American Life.

American Life is Madonna's second album to bear a "Parental Advisory" label after Erotica (1992), due to the profanity used in the title song. The album was released in the United States on April 22, 2003 and eight months later, Warner Music France released a box set version containing both the album and the remix collection, Remixed & Revisited, in a cardboard sleeve entitled Édition Spéciale 2CDs: American Life + Remixed & Revisited. To commemorate the 20th anniversary of the album's release, Madonna announced the release of an exclusive Record Store Day remixed EP of the album on April 22, 2023, in memory of Peter Rauhofer. A portion of the proceeds from this sale was given to charities specialising in brain cancer research.

To counter illegal downloads of the album, Madonna's associates created a number of false MP3 files of similar length and size. Some delivered a brief message from Madonna saying "What the fuck do you think you're doing?" followed by minutes of silence. Madonna's website was hacked and the hacker added a message appearing on the main page, saying "This is what the fuck I think I'm doing..." followed by download links for each of the album's songs. The website was closed after the attack for about 15 hours. Liz Rosenberg, Madonna's spokesperson, told The Smoking Gun that the defacement was not a marketing ploy. The hack was linked to Phrack, an online hacker magazine, but Phrack representatives denied knowledge. The hacked page also contained a derogatory reference to the Digital Millennium Copyright Act (DMCA), the federal law aimed at cracking down on digital and online piracy. In addition, the page included an impromptu marriage proposal to Morgan Webb, the host of the daily technology show The Screen Savers.

== Promotion ==
=== Live performances ===
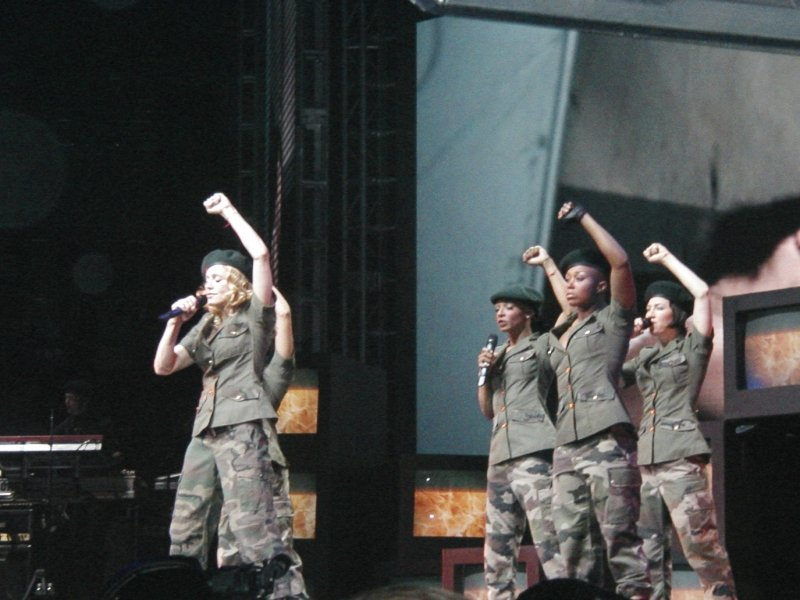
Madonna and her dancers performing the album's lead single and title track, "American Life", on the Re-Invention World Tour

To start marketing the album, Madonna embarked on a promotional tour across the United States and Europe. One of these performances, presented at the Total Request Live studios in New York, was shown by MTV in a special named Madonna on Stage & on the Record. Hosted by Carson Daly, she sang songs from the album and answered questions from the audience. Madonna also performed at the HMV store on Oxford Street, London to 500 people. While in the United Kingdom, she performed "American Life" and "Hollywood" at BBC One's Friday Night with Jonathan Ross and Top of the Pops. Another performance on Tower's Fourth Street in Manhattan was presented to around 400 people. A stage was built in preparation for the performances with long dark drapes and large speakers, and according to Billboard was so that over one thousand fans nearby could hear the performance. She also performed a private concert in Paris, France, at restaurant Cantine du Faubourg, to people who won tickets on a promotion hosted by NRJ Radio and some of her French friends, including designer Jean-Paul Gaultier, director Luc Besson and producer Ahmadzaï.

On August 27, 2003, Madonna opened the 2003 MTV Video Music Awards with American recording artists Britney Spears and Christina Aguilera, performing a medley of "Like a Virgin" and "Hollywood". American rapper Missy Elliott also performed her song "Work It" halfway through the performance. After "Hollywood" was performed by Madonna, she engaged in kissing with both Spears and Aguilera becoming an infamous moment for all three acts and in television history. In 2003, Madonna planned to release a special commemorative box set to celebrate her 20th anniversary in the music business and the release of her first studio album, Madonna, in 1983. The plan for the box set was eventually cancelled and Remixed & Revisited was released in its place. The compilation contains remixed versions of four songs from American Life and a previously unreleased song called "Your Honesty".

=== Singles ===
"Hollywood" (2003)
A 22-second sample of the song's chorus, featuring Madonna singing about the Hollywood lifestyle over a folk rock beat.

Preceding the album release, "Die Another Day" was released as a single to promote the twentieth James Bond film of the same name. The song peaked at number eight in the United States, and number three in the United Kingdom. The music video cost over six million dollars to produce, making it the third most expensive music video ever made, after "Work Bitch" by Britney Spears, and "Scream" by Michael Jackson and Janet Jackson.

"American Life" was released as the lead single from the album on April 8, 2003 in the United States and on April 14, 2003 in Europe. Blender magazine listed the song as the ninth worst song ever. There are two music videos. The first version is based on a fashion runway, with extras including children dressed in provocative war inspired outfits. The scene descends into violence and fighting to which the audience find amusement. At the end of the music video, then-President of the United States George W. Bush is portrayed by a lookalike lighting a cigar. The anti-war content of its music video was interpreted as unpatriotic, making Madonna withdraw its release from American music channels. She also released a statement saying she did so because she believed it was not appropriate to air it at that time, and that she did not want to risk offending anyone who could misinterpret its meaning. A second video was produced, showing Madonna donning military clothing and singing in front of the various flags of the world. The song debuted at number ninety on the Billboard Hot 100, and peaked at number thirty-seven on the chart, becoming Madonna's 45th Top 40 hit in the chart. The song also peaked at number two in the UK, seven in Austria and Australia, and ten in France and Germany.

The second single, "Hollywood", released on July 3, 2003 in Europe and July 8, 2003 in the US, failed to chart in the Hot 100, becoming Madonna's first single in twenty years not to do so since "Burning Up" (1983). The song was a top five hit in Canada, Italy and the United Kingdom.

"Nothing Fails" was released in October 26, 2003 as the third single, and backed with remixes of "Nobody Knows Me". It did not match the success of previous singles from American Life, charting outside the top twenty in some countries. It peaked in the top ten in Canada and reached number one in Spain. In late 2003, "Nothing Fails" was remixed as "Nothing Fails (Nevins Mix)" for Madonna's remix EP Remixed & Revisited.

"Love Profusion" was the fourth and final single from the album, released on December 8, 2003. It peaked in the top ten in Greece and Canada, her fifth top ten Canadian entry the album and thirteenth top ten in a row. It debuted and peaked at eleven on UK Singles Chart while topping the Spanish chart.

The promotional releases, "Nobody Knows Me" and "Mother and Father", became very successful in American clubs, peaking at number four and number nine, respectively, on the US Hot Dance Club Songs chart. American Life became the first album to achieve seven top ten songs on this chart.

=== Tour ===
In 2003, Madonna collaborated with photographer Steven Klein for an art installation project called X-Static Process. The installation portrayed Madonna in different incarnations of her spiritual practices – from yogi, prophet, queen to freak and pole dancer. The publication was a worldwide success, leading to a number of exhibitions in New York, London, Paris, Düsseldorf, Berlin and Florence. After the exhibition was over, Madonna was inspired by the images from the exhibitions and decided to incorporate them into her then unplanned tour and asked Klein to help her with the task. She then began developing her sixth concert tour called Re-Invention World Tour. The poster released for the tour used one of the images from the installation project. It featured Madonna in a seventeenth-century-style dress, crawling on all fours towards the camera. The central theme of the show was unity versus violence. It was divided into five acts with different themes: French Baroque-Marie Antionette Revival, Military-Army, Circus-Cabaret, Acoustic and Scottish-Tribal segments. During the Q Awards, Elton John accused Madonna for lip-synching in her shows which gained great controversy but was denied by Madonna's representatives. Although musician Prince's Musicology Live 2004ever tour was initially projected to be the highest grossing tour of 2004, Billboard Boxscore published that the Re-Invention Tour had sold 55 out of the 56 shows and grossed $125 million. At the 2004 Billboard Touring Awards, Re-Invention Tour received the Top Tour while Madonna's tour manager Caresse Henry was awarded the Top Manager award. A documentary, titled I'm Going to Tell You a Secret, which chronicled the tour, was released in 2005.

== Critical reception ==
Professional ratings
Aggregate scores
Source	Rating
Metacritic	60/100
Review scores
Source	Rating
AllMusic	2.5/5 stars
Entertainment Weekly	B−
The Guardian	3/5 stars
NME	7/10
Q	3/5 stars
Rolling Stone	3/5 stars
Slant Magazine	3.5/5 stars
Spin	B−
Stylus	F
Uncut	4/5 stars

Upon its release, American Life faced favorable to mixed reviews from music critics, holding a score of 60 out of 100 on music review website Metacritic, based on 17 professional reviews. Billboard's Michael Paoletta noted the lyrical differences from past albums such as Ray of Light positively, saying "American Life relies less on spiritual introspection and more on woman-in-the-mirror confrontation." Entertainment Weekly's Ken Tucker generally responded well, saying that at its best, the album offers blunt, questing and decisive music but the weakest point was Madonna sounding like a girl who's grown content with her husband and kids and the ability to hire help to do her bidding. Dimitri Ebrlich of Vibe magazine gave a positive review for American Life, saying that Madonna "stayed still" in the album, and commenting that "This may be the first time Madonna hasn't pushed herself to explore new ground, but at least she's chosen a good place to rest." Sal Cinquemani from Slant Magazine gave the album a mixed review, stating that American Life is not a "masterpiece" compared to her 1992 studio album, Erotica. "It's frequently self-indulgent, misguided, unpleasant, difficult to listen to, silly and humorless, but it's also consistent, uncompromising and unapologetic," Cinquemani opined, ending with the deduction that American Life stood for the last time Madonna made music without the primary objective of making a hit.

Giving the album three out of five stars, Ben Ratliff from Rolling Stone summarized that the messages on the album are dour, but complimented Madonna for talking about the then-current situation of the nation. Johny Davis from NME gave the album a rating of seven out of ten, saying that technically the album sounds good, but overall it felt like an unnecessary sequel to Madonna's previous endeavors like Ray of Light and Music. Allmusic's Stephen Thomas Erlewine stated that American Life is better for what it promises than what it delivers, and that it is better in theory than practice. Kelefa Sanneh from Blender awarded the album three stars out of five. "Just as disjointed as Music and much more severe ... Without a compelling back story, her songs seem diminished". Dorian Lynskey from Q magazine also rated it three out of five, stating "'Nothing Fails', the album's centerpiece, is as good a showstopper as 'Live to Tell' ... [but] it's no wonder that a record about feeling confused ends up sounding confused".

Jon Pareles from The New York Times felt that Madonna tried to be honest with the concept of American Dream in the album, but ended up producing songs akin to the "folkie psychobabble" of songwriters like Jewel. James Hannaham from Spin compared the album's introspective themes to her previous albums Ray of Light and Music and noted Madonna spends much of American Life bemoaning the emptiness of celebrity culture. Alexis Petridis of The Guardian responded well to parts of the record, saying "American Life's best tracks make a mockery of virtually all other current pop music"; however, his conclusion in the review was that there were not enough good songs. The Village Voice's Jessica Winter called Madonna's voice "redundant" and commented that "she ironizes 'the American dream' only to pitch woo at her English husband and articulate a vague yet fiery frustration with her outrageously privileged station in the world". Ed Howard from Stylus Magazine gave the album a negative review, calling the album "about Madonna" instead of American culture, explaining, "it's Madonna who, surprisingly, has simply run out of things to say". BBC's Ian Young also gave a negative review, saying that "the tunes are bland and weak, the lyrics are uninspired and self-absorbed and the semi-Ibiza backing music is bare and recycled—and we are convinced that she has lost it."

== Commercial performance ==
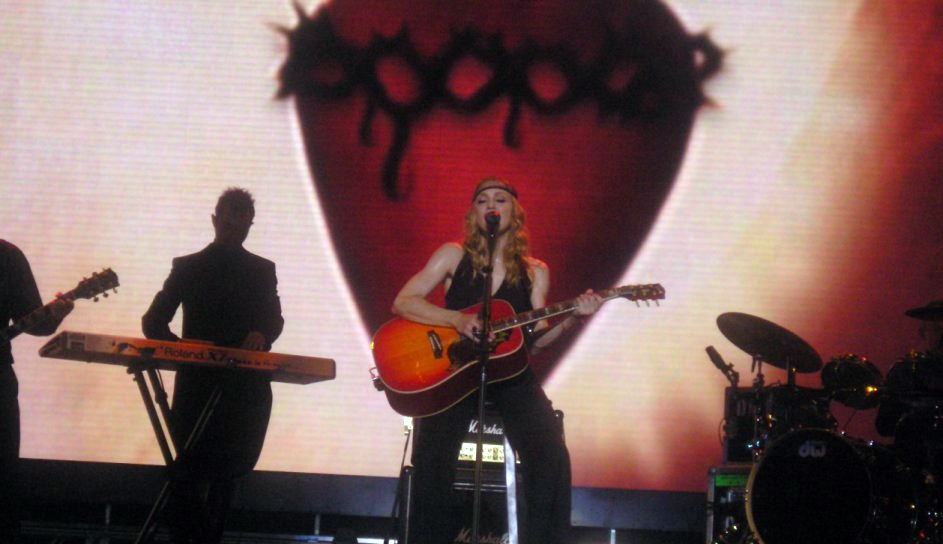
Madonna performing American Life's ninth track, "Mother and Father", during the Re-Invention World Tour

After its release, American Life debuted at number one on the United States Billboard 200 chart with 241,000 copies sold in its first week. The sales were less than Madonna's previous studio album, Music, which debuted with 420,000 copies in 2000, but was the only one that week to sell over 200,000 copies. It was Madonna's second consecutive number one debut, and her fifth number one album overall in the US. The next week, sales dropped by 62% to 91,000 copies, and the album slid from the top of the chart to number eight. It continued to decrease in sales down the chart and fell off the Billboard 200. In September 2003, following Madonna's performance at the MTV Video Music Awards, the album saw a sales gain of 19%, but did not chart back. On July 7, 2003, just months after the release, it was certified Platinum by the Recording Industry Association of America (RIAA), signifying shipment of one million copies in the US alone. However, it became the fourth lowest selling studio album by Madonna behind her 2012 release MDNA, her 2015 release Rebel Heart and her 2019 release Madame X, with sales of 680,000 copies as of October 2012, according to Nielsen SoundScan. It ranked at number 125 on the year-end ranking of the albums by Billboard. In Canada, the album debuted at the top of the Canadian Albums Chart with sales of 18,000 copies on May 10, 2003. According to Nielsen SoundScan, the sum was considerably less than her previous studio efforts, Ray of Light (1998) and Music (2000), which debuted with 59,000 and 50,000 copies respectively. It gained a Platinum certification one month later from the Canadian Recording Industry Association (CRIA), for shipment of 100,000 copies of the album.

In the United Kingdom, American Life debuted atop the UK Albums Chart, with sales of 65,013 copies, much less than the opening sum of 2000's Music, which debuted with sales of 151,891 copies. The next week, it was pushed down to the third position, by Justin Timberlake's album, Justified, and The White Stripes album, Elephant. It continued its downward movement, falling to number five in its third week on the chart and was out of the top ten by its fifth week. It was present for a total of 19 weeks on the chart, ranking at number 52 on the UK year-end tally. American Life sold 335,115 copies by July 2008 and earned a Platinum certification from the British Phonographic Industry (BPI). In European countries, the album topped the charts in Austria, Belgium (Flanders), Belgium (Wallonia), Czech Republic, Denmark, France, Italy, Norway, Sweden and Switzerland. The International Federation of the Phonographic Industry (IFPI) awarded American Life Platinum certification, signifying sales of over one million copies across Europe. The album also gained Platinum certifications in countries such as France, Russia, and Switzerland, and Gold certifications in Brazil, Greece, and the Netherlands.

In Japan, the album peaked at number four on the Oricon Weekly Albums chart remaining there for 13 weeks, and went on to gain a Gold certification from the Recording Industry Association of Japan (RIAJ) that same year, for shipping 100,000 copies of the release. In Australia the album peaked at number three, before descending rapidly down the ARIA Albums Chart. Nevertheless, it gained a Platinum certification from the Australian Recording Industry Association (ARIA) for shipping 70,000 copies. Overall, American Life became the 32nd bestselling album of 2003, and sold five million copies worldwide.

== Legacy ==
American Life achieved an impact in the Internet culture of the time; it sparked debate according to Lynette Holloway from The New York Times. In Branding Unbound (2005), Rick Mathieson explained the album was promoted in wireless markets. He explored how Madonna's foray into the medium inspired other marketers and advertisers, cementing her "reputation for innovation and staying power" and sparking a "revolution of wireless ad campaigns".

The release of American Life has been also noted for Madonna's forays fighting online piracy, with various labeling her stunt as a response not just to file-sharing community, but also against the very notion of free culture. Madonna's fake tracks to peer-to-peer communities, as her own strategy to stop piracy of the album, were called by media "WTF". Although according to author Matt Mason, the tracks became viral movilizing hackers, remixers and hacktivists and soon radio stations and clubs around the world were playing pirate remixes of "WTF". Fifteen of the best illegal remixes were compiled and released on an album by an independent label, and a website called "Madonna Remix Project" was created.

American Life also achieved early record-breaking streaming figures on websites such as MTV, Launch.com, MSN and AOL. According to MTV's representatives, the channel "has not previously seen such concentrated response rate for a dotcom programming feature before" when they launched their web-based album previews in 1999. Madonna also became the second artist in history to debut with a song based on Internet sales alone on the Billboard Hot 100 with album's title track. The digital release was touted as an alternative to fighting illegal downloading and seeking to "inspire other artists to do the same". American Life became the first album in history to have seven top ten hits on the US Dance Club Songs.

Lucy O'Brien commented American Life marked a "significant dip" in her career, but like a lot of her peers, she had been "compromised as an artist" when a cultural "atmosphere of fear" invaded the United States. Commercially, the album was regarded a failure according to Madonna's own "hitmaking precedent". In 2005, when acknowledging American Life as her lowest-selling album in her career up to that point, Madonna referred to it as one of her catalog's favorite records. Queerty magazine commented that with the record, "Madonna showed that pop music could be about more than just partying and love songs. It was a bold move that paid off, cementing her status as a trailblazer in the music industry." The publication concluded that the album acts as a time capsule and "as an example of how music can be used to challenge the status quo and make us think about our own values and beliefs".

=== Retrospective reviews ===
Retrospective reviews of the album have been more positive, with some reviewers praising Madonna's risks making political statements. The album has also developed a cult following. Editor Matthew Rettenmund commented "many of the songs are on par with her best work". "Easy Ride", "X-Static Process" and "Nobody Knows Me" were included among Madonna's greatest deep cuts in rankings by publications such as Slant Magazine, PopMatters, VH1 and the Official Charts Company.

A re-review by The Guardian described the album as a "brilliantly odd peek behind fame's velvet rope" and "tantalising", and their staffers picked the album as one of her best. In 2015, Billboard magazine staffers called it an "uneven album" but "not as bad as some detractors would have you believe". They stated, "you have to applaud the album's adventurous melange of electronica, folk and pop music – not to mention the incisive, skeptical lyrics". Chuck Arnold from the same magazine noted American Life as "underappreciated" and "ambitious" and complimented the album's cohesiveness. Another contributor from the magazine, Jon O'Brien, commented, "its lyrics were a little more revolutionary". While reviewing the album and her discography, Saeed Saeed from The National commented that "even Madonna's worst albums are considered a solid offering when compared to other artists". Mike Wass from Idolator headlined American Life as an "underrated gem". Conversely, in January 2023, Rolling Stone ranked American Life at number 26 on their list of the "50 Genuinely Horrible Albums by Brilliant Artists", characterizing "the whole project [...] hopelessly muddled when it wasn't just downright embarrassing".

=== Accolades ===
American Life achieved award nominations. At the Hungarian Music Awards of 2004 and 2005, the album was nominated both times in the category of International Pop Album of the Year, but failed to win. Another nomination was for a similar category at the 2004 NRJ Music Awards and 2003 Shangay Awards. In 2004, the album was nominated at the 46th Grammy Awards in two categories, Best Short Form Music Video and Best Dance Recording, both for the song "Die Another Day." It was also nominated for Best Video from a Film at the 2003 MTV Video Music Awards.

== Track listing ==
All tracks are written by and produced by Madonna and Mirwais Ahmadzaï, except where noted.

American Life track listing
No.	Title	Writer(s)	Producer(s)	Length
1.	"American Life"			4:58
2.	"Hollywood"			4:24
3.	"I'm So Stupid"		Madonna; Ahmadzaï; Mark "Spike" Stent	4:09
4.	"Love Profusion"			3:38
5.	"Nobody Knows Me"			4:39
6.	"Nothing Fails"	Madonna; Guy Sigsworth; Jem Griffiths	Madonna; Ahmadzaï; Stent	4:49
7.	"Intervention"			4:54
8.	"X-Static Process"	Madonna; Stuart Price		3:50
9.	"Mother and Father"			4:33
10.	"Die Another Day"			4:38
11.	"Easy Ride"	Madonna; Monte Pittman		5:05
Total length:				49:39

== Personnel ==
Credits and personnel adapted from the album's liner notes.

- Madonna – vocals, background vocals
- Mirwais Ahmadzaï – acoustic guitar, keyboards, programming, background vocals
- Mark "Spike" Stent – additional producer
- Stuart Price – piano, synthesizers, keyboards, sequencing, programming
- Michel Colombier – songwriter, conductor, string arrangement
- The London Community Gospel Choir – backing vocals
- Monte Pittman – composer, guitar
- Jem Griffiths – songwriter
- Guy Sigsworth – songwriter
- George Foster – string engineer
- Rob Haggett – assistant engineer
- Tom Hannen – assistant engineer
- Jeff Kanan – assistant engineer
- Tim Lambert – assistant engineer
- Gabe Sganga – assistant engineer
- David Treahearn – assistant engineer
- Tim Young – mastering
- Craig McDean – photography

== Charts ==
=== Weekly charts ===
Weekly chart performance for American Life
Chart (2003)	Peak position
Argentine Albums (CAPIF)	2
Australian Albums (ARIA)	3
Australian Dance Albums (ARIA)	1
Austrian Albums (Ö3 Austria)	1
Belgian Albums (Ultratop Flanders)	1
Belgian Albums (Ultratop Wallonia)	1
Canadian Albums (Billboard)	1
Czech Albums (ČNS IFPI)	1
Danish Albums (Hitlisten)	2
Dutch Albums (Album Top 100)	3
European Albums (Billboard)	1
Finnish Albums (Suomen virallinen lista)	2
French Albums (SNEP)	1
German Albums (Offizielle Top 100)	1
Greek Albums (IFPI)	2
Hungarian Albums (MAHASZ)	3
Iceland (Íslenski Listinn Topp 20)	7
Irish Albums (IRMA)	6
Italian Albums (FIMI)	1
Japanese Albums (Oricon)	4
New Zealand Albums (RMNZ)	2
Norwegian Albums (VG-lista)	1
Polish Albums (ZPAV)	4
Portuguese Albums (AFP)	10
Scottish Albums (Official Charts)	1
Spanish Albums (PROMUSICAE)	2
Swedish Albums (Sverigetopplistan)	1
Swiss Albums (Schweizer Hitparade)	1
UK Albums (Official Charts)	1
US Billboard 200	1

Chart (2023)	Peak position
Croatian International Albums (HDU)	2

Weekly chart performance for American Life: Mixshow Mix (Honoring Peter Rauhofer)
Chart (2023)	Peak position
Croatian International Albums (HDU)	3
Danish Vinyl (Hitlisten)	19
Dutch Vinyl (MegaCharts)	24
Greek Albums (IFPI Greece)	62
Hungarian Albums (MAHASZ)	11
Italian Vinyl (FIMI)	6
Polish Vinyl (ZPAV)	32
Scottish Albums (OCC)	34
Spanish Vinyl (PROMUSICAE)	24
UK Album Sales (OCC)	25
US Top Album Sales (Billboard)	32
US Top Dance Albums (Billboard)	6
US Indie Store Album Sales (Billboard)	21

=== Monthly charts ===
Monthly chart performance for American Life
Chart (2003)	Peak position
Argentine Albums (CAPIF)	6
South Korean Albums (RIAK)	11

=== Year-end charts ===
2003 year-end chart performance for American Life
Chart (2003)	Position
Australian Dance Albums (ARIA)	12
Austrian Albums (Ö3 Austria)	58
Belgian Albums (Ultratop Flanders)	30
Belgian Alternative Albums (Ultratop Flanders)	13
Belgian Albums (Ultratop Wallonia)	21
Danish Albums (Hitlisten)	49
Dutch Albums (Album Top 100)	63
Finnish Foreign Albums (Suomen virallinen lista)	27
French Albums (SNEP)	14
German Albums (Offizielle Top 100)	19
Hungarian Albums (MAHASZ)	55
Hungarian Albums & Compilations (MAHASZ)	47
Italian Albums (FIMI)	47
Norwegian Russetid Albums (VG-lista)	10
Norwegian Skoleslutt Albums (VG-lista)	18
Swedish Albums (Sverigetopplistan)	67
Swedish Albums & Compilations (Sverigetopplistan)	94
Swiss Albums (Schweizer Hitparade)	16
UK Albums (OCC)	52
US Billboard 200	125
Worldwide (IFPI)	32

Chart (2004)	Position
Belgian Midprice Albums (Ultratop Wallonia)	19
French Albums (SNEP)	93

== Certifications and sales ==
Certifications and sales for American Life
Region	Certification	Certified units/sales
Argentina (CAPIF)	Platinum	40,000^{^}
Australia (ARIA)	Platinum	70,000^{^}
Belgium (BRMA)	Gold	25,000^{*}
Brazil (Pro-Música Brasil)	Gold	50,000^{*}
Canada (Music Canada)	Platinum	100,000^{^}
Czech Republic	—	14,000
Denmark (IFPI Danmark)	Gold	20,000^{^}
Finland	—	13,100
France (SNEP)	Platinum	600,000
Germany (BVMI)	Platinum	200,000^{^}
Greece (IFPI Greece)	Gold	10,000^{^}
Hungary (MAHASZ)	Gold	10,000^{^}
Italy	—	150,000 (Note: Italian sales as of May 8, 2003.)
Japan (RIAJ)	Platinum	200,000^{^}
Netherlands (NVPI)	Gold	40,000^{^}
Russia (NFPF)	Platinum	20,000^{*}
South Korea	—	10,488
Spain (Promusicae)	Gold	70,000 (Note: Spanish sales as of March 2006.)
Sweden (GLF)	Gold	30,000^{^}
Switzerland (IFPI Switzerland)	Platinum	40,000^{^}
Taiwan	—	80,000
United Kingdom (BPI)	Platinum	335,115 (Note: UK sales as of July 2008.)
United States (RIAA)	Platinum	680,000
Summaries
Europe (IFPI)	Platinum	1,000,000^{*}
Worldwide	—	5,000,000
^{*} Sales figures based on certification alone.^{^} Shipments figures based on certification alone.

== Release history ==
Release dates for American Life
Region	Date	Format	Label
United States	April 21, 2003	Digital download	Warner Bros.
United Kingdom	April 21, 2003	Digital download	Warner Bros.
Canada	April 22, 2003	CD	Warner Bros.
Europe	May 19, 2003	Vinyl	Warner Bros.

== See also ==
- List of number-one albums of 2003 (Canada)
- List of number-one hits of 2003 (Germany)
- List of Billboard 200 number-one albums of 2003

== Bibliography ==
- Alexander, Skye; Gordon, Rochelle; Stiegltz, Nadia (2003), Love Signs and You: The Ultimate Astrological Guide to Love, Sex, and Relationships, Simon and Schuster, ISBN 0-7434-7649-2
- Clerk, Carol (2008). Madonna Style. Music Sales Group. ISBN 978-0-85712-218-6.
- Fouz-Hernández, Santiago; Jarman-Ivens, Freya (2004), Madonna's Drowned Worlds: New Approaches to Her Cultural Transformations, Ashgate Publishing, Ltd, ISBN 0-7546-3372-1
- Gardner, Abigail (2016). 'Rock On': Women, Ageing and Popular Music. Routledge. ISBN 978-1317189091.
- Johnson, Sam (2008), Exploring Corporate Strategy: Text & Cases, 7/E, Pearson Education India, ISBN 978-81-317-1925-1
- Mason, Matt (2008). The Pirate's Dilemma. Penguin Books. ISBN 978-01-4192-063-4.
- Mathieson, Rick (2005). Branding Unbound: The Future of Advertising, Sales, and the Brand Experience in the Wireless Age. AMACOM. ISBN 0814428908.
- Matos, Michaelangelo (2020), Can't Slow Down: How 1984 Became Pop's Blockbuster Year, Hachette Books, ISBN 978-0-306-90335-9
- O'Brien, Lucy (2008), Madonna: Like an Icon, Bantam Press, ISBN 978-0-552-15361-4
- Rooksby, Rikky (2004). The Complete Guide to the Music of Madonna. Omnibus Press. ISBN 0-7119-9883-3.
- Taraborrelli, J. Randy (2008), Madonna: An Intimate Biography, Pan Books, ISBN 978-0-330-45446-9
- Timmerman, Dirk (2007). Madonna Live! Secret Re-inventions and Confessions on Tour. Maklu. ISBN 978-90-8595-002-8.
