= Nothing Fails =

2003 single by Madonna

Single by Madonna

from the album American Life
- B-side: "Nobody Knows Me"
- Released: October 27, 2003
- Recorded: 2002
- Studio: Olympic (London, UK)
- Genre: Pop; gospel
- Length: 4:48
- Label: Maverick; Warner Bros.
- Songwriters: Madonna; Guy Sigsworth; Jem Griffiths
- Producers: Madonna; Mirwais Ahmadzaï

Madonna singles chronology
"Me Against the Music" (2003)	"Nothing Fails" (2003)	"Love Profusion" (2003)

Licensed audio
- "Nothing Fails" on YouTube

"Nothing Fails" is a song by American singer-songwriter Madonna from her ninth studio album, American Life (2003). Written by Madonna, Guy Sigsworth and Jem Griffiths, and produced by the singer along with Mirwais Ahmadzaï and Mark "Spike" Stent, it was released as the third single from the album on October 27, 2003. Originally demoed as "Silly Thing", "Nothing Fails" is a love song which has acoustic guitar chords and a gospel choir appearance. Lyrically, the song discusses a lover who is the one, and how their meeting was not just chance. A number of remixes were done, including one on Madonna's remix album Remixed & Revisited (2003).

The song received generally positive reviews, with music critics praising it as one of the best tracks from American Life, while others compared it with Madonna's previous single "Like a Prayer" (1989), as both songs feature a gospel choir. "Nothing Fails" was released in the US in hopes of attaining sales from American Life. However, it did not chart on the US Billboard Hot 100, making it the second single from the album to fail to chart in the US. Nevertheless, the song reached number one on the Hot Dance Club Songs and Hot Singles Sales charts. It was also released in Australia and most of Europe, but not the UK, although the radio edit of the song appeared on the "Love Profusion" single there. The single reached number one in Spain and the top ten in Canada and Italy.

Although initially reported on the contrary, no music video was filmed for "Nothing Fails". The song was performed during a promotional tour for American Life in 2003, along with other songs from the album and her past hits. One of these performances was shown by MTV in a special named Madonna on Stage & on the Record. It was also performed during Madonna's sixth concert tour, the Re-Invention World Tour (2004), with Madonna alone on stage singing the song accompanied by an acoustic guitar. Many reviewers noted that Madonna in the performance was a "solitary figure" as it was herself alone playing the acoustic guitar.

== Background and recording ==
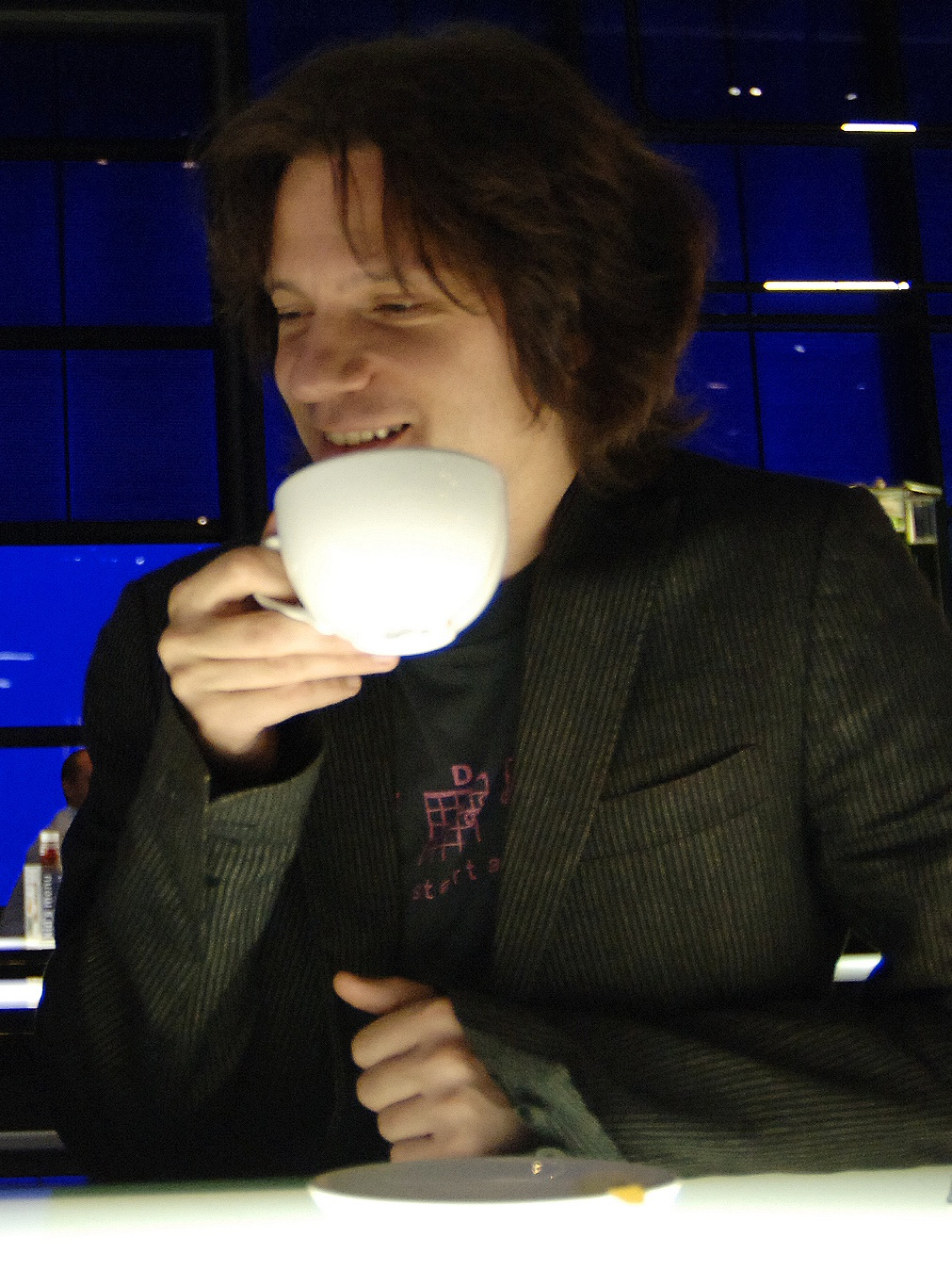
"Nothing Fails" started out as a demo track titled "Silly Thing," co-written by British musician-producer Guy Sigworth (pictured above) for his wife.

According to Lucy O'Brien, author of Madonna: Like an Icon, the main concept of American Life was about "nothing". This was evident in the titles of the songs like "Nobody Knows Me", usage of "no" in "Love Profusion", as well as "Nothing Fails". Usage of the negative tone led Madonna to be sarcastic on people's assumptions about her and emphasize about her knowledge of romantic love. "Nothing Fails" began as a humble track that musician-producer Guy Sigsworth wrote for his wife. He asked singer Jem Griffiths to collaborate with him and during their first collaborative session, they wrote a song called "Silly Thing", inspired by Sigsworth's wife. He said: "I never write love songs, but I was moved to write one for her. I've never had a problematic relationship with her, there's not been a lot of drama. But I wanted to write something naive and honest." The demo, which was reminiscent of an offbeat folk song, was later played for Madonna, who loved it and changed parts of the song, including the title. In September 2012, Sigsworth leaked the original version of "Nothing Fails", describing it as a "work-in-progress demo of a song I originally wrote with Jem, and which later became 'Nothing Fails', co-written and recorded by Madonna. It's over ten years old". On "Nothing Fails", Griffiths said:

"When I actually heard it I was so shocked, [be]cause it was the first time I believed [my career] was actually going to happen. And to hear Madonna singing it was like, oh my [God], so bizarre. My mom keeps calling me whenever it's on. She'll go to shops in the UK and hold the phone up to the thing and I'm like, 'They're going to arrest you.'"

"Nothing Fails" was produced by Madonna and Mirwais Ahmadzaï, with an additional production by Mark "Spike" Stent. The recording sessions for American Life started at late 2001, then was put on hold as Madonna filmed Swept Away in Malta and Sardinia and starred in the West End play Up for Grabs. She returned to the Olympic Recording Studios in late 2002 and finished off the sessions. The mixing for the track was done by Mark "Spike" Stent at the Westlake Recording Studios at West Hollywood, California, while Tim Young did the mastering of the song at Metropolis Studios in London. Michael Colombier did the string arrangement with Geoff Foster acting as the strings engineer, conducting at AIR Studios. For the instrumentation featured in the song, Ahmadzaï played the guitars, and Stuart Price played the piano.

== Composition and remixes ==
"Nothing Fails" features an acoustic guitar introduction, which is a recurring theme of American Life. The guitar is accompanied by a "light" drum section and low-pitched vocals from Madonna and also features a cello in the first part of the song, while gospel music comes in at the later half. According to the sheet music published at Musicnotes.com by Alfred Publishing, "Nothing Fails" is written in the time signature of common time with a moderately slow tempo of 92 beats per minute. It is composed in the key of B♭ major with Madonna's voice spanning from F_{3} to B♭_{4}. The song follows a basic sequence of Gm–F–E♭–B♭–Gm as its chord progression.

Lyrically, the song discusses a lover who is the one, and how their meeting was not just chance, a reference to the "tree of life" is made during the song while Madonna makes denouncements of religion by singing "I'm not religious" but she wishes to pray. Bill Friskics-Warren, author of I'll Take You There: Pop Music and the Urge for Transcendence, described the lyrics as consisting of double entendre, talking about both spiritual and sexual rebirth. The London Community Gospel Choir, led by Nicki Brown, recorded backing vocals for the song. The strings engineer for the choir, Geoff Foster, recalls that the group consisted of "a bunch of great singers giving it loudly, it was impressive." According to Rolling Stone and The Advocate, the song glides from a lean arrangement and then reaches its peak with the gospel chorus, which resembles that of Madonna's single, "Like a Prayer" (1989).

A remix version for the song, "Jackie's In Love In The Club Mix", done by DJ Jackie Christie, was made available as one of the exclusive tracks of the American and European maxi-single release of the song. She maintained Madonna's vocals and the gospel choir appearance, commenting that "I was asked to remix 'Nothing Fails' [...] I wanted it to be a mainfloor mix with a big choir breakdown so you felt the magic of the Madonna and the choir, like church." Peter Rauhofer's remix of the song was added along with the remixes of the follow-up single, "Love Profusion". Another version, the "Jason Nevins Mix", was included on Madonna's 2003 remix album Remixed & Revisited. Stephen Thomas Erlewine from Allmusic commented that on this remix, Madonna sounds as if she is out of step with the music of 2003.

== Critical reception ==
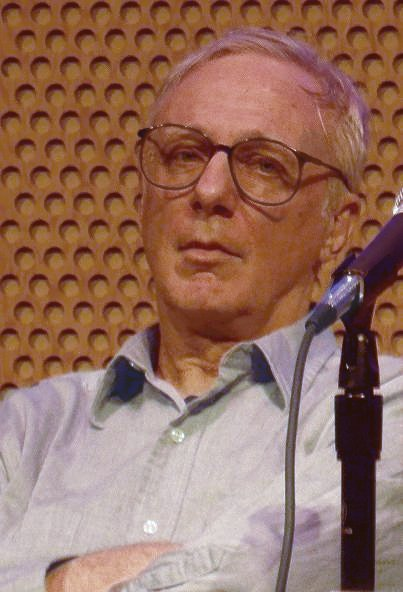
Critic Robert Christgau deemed "Nothing Fails" and "Mother and Father" the highlights from American Life.

"Nothing Fails" received mostly positive reviews from music critics. O'Brien listed it as a "hymn of devotion" and "the most majestic song on American Life". She complemented the "dramatic, theatrical air" of the song and noted that the addition of the choir made the song revelatory and ecstatic. J. Randy Taraborrelli wrote in his book, Madonna: An Intimate Biography, that although the album was not a strong, cohesive package, "Nothing Fails" stood out as one of the few gems. In a review for the album as a whole, Michael Paoletta from Billboard called it a highlight of American Life, describing the song as "tear-inducing". Entertainment Weekly's Ken Tucker called it "lovely" and named it, among other songs from the album "refreshingly – hell, shockingly – earnest". Alexis Petridis from The Guardian praised its choral finale.

Slant Magazine's Sal Cinquemani labeled it one of the moments of greatness on the album. Ian Youngs from BBC Music gave a positive review for "Nothing Fails", writing that less is more when it comes to Mirwais' electronic tricks. Johnny Davis from NME commented that "only 'Nothing Fails' and 'Intervention' dip beneath the frenetically poppy, with neither a 'Ray of Light'-style glitterball stomper, nor a big ballad to act as a breather". Josh Tyrangiel from Time found Madonna's singing in "Nothing Fails" as relaxed and woeful, consisting of "plenty of soul". A review in the Telegram & Gazette complimented the song for successfully blending between the "spiritual and the sensual". Jon Pareles from The New York Times believed that "Nothing Fails" was able to raise sentiments likened by other people and was prone to introspection, unlike other Madonna tunes. Stephen Thompson of The A.V. Club considered the song "emotionally resonant", but characterized the introduction of a choir as "busy".

Instead of praising "Nothing Fails", Chuck Taylor from Billboard said that the song "illustrates everything that makes [American Life] a grind". Ben Ratliff from Rolling Stone compared it negatively to "Like a Prayer" and commented it is much closer to what she's become good at: the idea of transfiguration through love, declaring that the difference in 2003 is she doesn't have the ambition. Stylus Magazine also compared it negatively to "Like a Prayer", calling it "an off-hand denouncement of religion" and stating that "the same old song, over 10 years later, just doesn't cut it anymore". Jim DeRogatis of the Chicago Sun-Times found the lyric "I'm not religious" to be "confusing and befuddling", as Madonna references Jesus Christ and Satan in other songs on the album. Jude Rogers from The Guardian called it a "quiet, gospel-dazzled jewel" from American Life, placing it at number 48 on her ranking of Madonna's singles, in honor of her 60th birthday. Chuck Arnold from Entertainment Weekly listed "Nothing Fails" as the singer's 29th best single, calling it "a triumph - creatively not commercially - that goes from stripped-down earnestness to churched-up gloriousness".

== Chart performance ==
Following the commercial disappointment of "American Life" and "Hollywood"—the first two singles from American Life—Maverick sent a radio remix of "Nothing Fails" in hopes of attaining sales. The song was sent to Mainstream Top 40 radio on October 28, 2003. "Nothing Fails" did not chart in the United States; however, it was a commercial success on the dance charts. According to Fred Bronson, the single release of the remixes of the song debuted at number-one on the Hot Singles Sales and Hot Dance Single Sales chart, on the issue dated December 27, 2003, the same week it also moved up to the top-twenty of the Dance Club Songs chart. "Me Against the Music" by Britney Spears, on which Madonna was featured, and "Nobody Knows Me", both were also present in the top-twenty, making Madonna the only artist to have three songs within the top-twenty on the chart simultaneously. However, the single sold less than 10,000 units according to Nielsen SoundScan, marking one of the lowest totals at the time for a number-one song on the chart. At the year-end Hot Dance Singles Sales recap, "Nothing Fails" was at number two position, while "Me Against the Music" and "Love Profusion" were at numbers one and three respectively. Billboard reported that Madonna was the first artist in its chart history to have the top three Dance Sales song.

In Australia, Warner Bros. Records released a maxi-CD single of "Nothing Fails". The release was considered an album by ARIA due to the number of different tracks; it peaked at number 126 on the ARIA Albums Chart. However, it did appear on the ARIA Dance Albums Chart at number six. The song also reached the top ten in Canada. In Europe, "Nothing Fails" achieved moderate success on the charts. In Austria, "Nothing Fails" debuted at number 74, and one week later, peaked at number 51, going on to spend six weeks inside the chart. On January 3, 2004, "Nothing Fails" debuted at its peak of number 50 on the Belgian Flanders Singles Chart. However, it peaked at number three on the Ultratip chart of Wallonia. The song debuted at number 16 on the Danish Singles Chart, peaking at number 11 the next week. The song debuted at its peak of number 34 on the French Singles Chart on November 30, 2003. In its second week, the song began its decline, falling out of the chart at number 97, almost four months later. Estimated sales stand at 24,818 units in France. The song had commercial success in Italy, reaching the top ten on its singles chart, and also in Spain where it reached the top of the chart. On the German Singles Chart, the song peaked at number 36.

== Promotion and live performances ==
No music video was filmed for promotion of "Nothing Fails". Initially it was reported by Daily Mirror that Madonna planned to shoot the video in Israel with actor Michael Douglas. According to Polly Graham from the newspaper, Warner Bros. executives were concerned about the singer's safety in Israel, but Madonna was adamant. "Her record bosses are really worried about it. They are trying to talk her around, but she's having none of it. She has told them it makes sense to shoot it in Israel as the Kabbalah originates from there. Madonna is not particularly bothered about her safety and potential risks. She doesn't think it's as bad as it seems." Her then husband Guy Ritchie was also facing difficulty with his project, Revolver, which was rejected by Sony Pictures executives since it contained references to Kabbalah, and they asked Ritchie to re-write the script. Since the video itself would have included symbolism from Kabbalah, Madonna ultimately decided to not film the music video. These reports were later refuted by the artist during an interview with San Francisco radio station Alice 97.3, where she explained that no music video would be shot for the single.

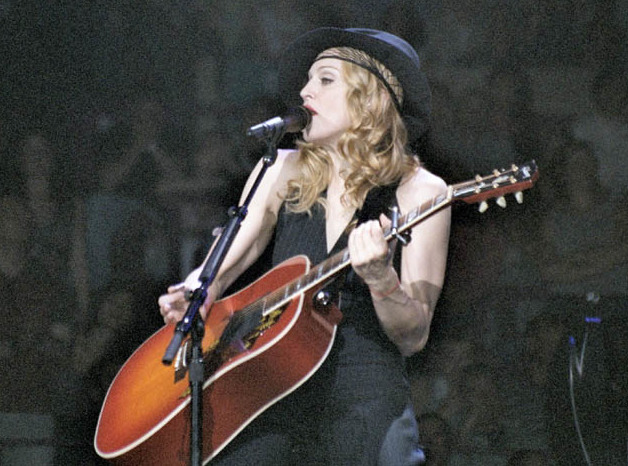
Madonna singing "Nothing Fails" on 2004's Re-Invention World Tour.

To start marketing American Life, Madonna embarked on a promo tour. One of these performances, presented at the Total Request Live studios in New York, was shown by MTV in a special named Madonna on Stage & on the Record. Hosted by Carson Daly, she sang "Nothing Fails" and other songs from American Life while answered questions from the audience. Madonna also performed the song at HMV store in Oxford Street, London, to around 500 people. She wore a black beret, polka-dot blouse, black trousers and heels. The setlist included "American Life", "Hollywood", "Nothing Fails", "X-Static Process" and "Mother and Father" before performing her previous singles "Like a Prayer" and "Don't Tell Me". She also played the acoustic guitar during some songs and played the wrong chords at the beginning of "X-Static Process".

The next year, Madonna performed the song on the Re-Invention World Tour as the first song from the acoustic segment of the concert. She arrived on stage dressed in a black Stella McCartney suit and accompanied by an acoustic guitar to sing the song. Jane Stevenson from Toronto Sun described Madonna as a "solitary figure", as it was her alone playing the acoustic guitar. Bret McCabe from Baltimore City Paper described it as a "warm-up" performance. During the concert in Ireland, she wore a black coat and was protected by an umbrella while performing the song during the rain. This occurrence was mentioned in the I'm Going to Tell You a Secret documentary, which chronicled the whole tour.

== Track listings and formats ==
- EU 2-track CD single
1. "Nothing Fails" (Radio Edit) – 3:46
2. "Nothing Fails" (Peter Rauhofer's Classic House Mix) – 8:24
- EU CD maxi-single
1. "Nothing Fails" (Radio Edit) – 3:46
2. "Nothing Fails" (Peter Rauhofer's Classic House Mix) – 8:24
3. "Nothing Fails" (Tracy Young's Underground Mix) – 7:29
4. "Nothing Fails" (Nevins Big Room Rock Mix) – 6:44
- European, Australian and US CD maxi-single
1. "Nothing Fails" (Peter Rauhofer's Classic House Mix) – 8:24
2. "Nothing Fails" (Nevins Big Room Rock Mix) – 6:44
3. "Nothing Fails" (Tracy Young's Underground Mix) – 7:29
4. "Nothing Fails" (Nevins Global Dub) – 7:45
5. "Nothing Fails" (Jackie's in Love in the Club Mix) – 7:28
6. "Nobody Knows Me" (Peter Rauhofer's Private Life Mix Part 1) – 8:07
7. "Nobody Knows Me" (Above & Beyond 12" Mix) – 8:45
8. "Nobody Knows Me" (Mount Sims Italo Kiss Mix) – 5:26
- Nothing Fails / Love Profusion European CD single
1. "Nothing Fails" (Radio Edit) – 3:46
2. "Love Profusion" (Album Version) – 3:38
3. "Love Profusion" (The Passengerz Club) – 7:01
- US 12" promo vinyl
1. A1 "Nothing Fails" (Peter Rauhofer's Classic House Mix) – 8:24
2. B1 "Nothing Fails" (Nevins Big Room Rock Mix) – 6:44
3. B2 "Nothing Fails" (Nevins Global Dub) – 7:45
- US 12" promo vinyl
1. "Nothing Fails" (Peter Rauhofer's Lost In Space Mix) – 8:36

- US, German promo CD single
1. "Nothing Fails" (Radio Edit) – 3:46
2. "Nothing Fails" (Radio Remix) – 3:59
- US promo 2 × 12" vinyl
1. A1 "Nothing Fails" (Peter Rauhofer's Classic House Mix) – 7:38
2. A2 "Nothing Fails" (Nevins Big Room Rock Mix) – 6:44
3. B1 "Nothing Fails" (Tracy Young's Underground Mix) – 7:29
4. B2 "Nothing Fails" (Jackie's in Love in the Club Mix) – 7:28
5. C1 "Nothing Fails" (Nevins Global Dub) – 7:45
6. C2 "Nobody Knows Me" (Mount Sims Italo Kiss Mix) – 5:26
7. D1 "Nobody Knows Me" (Mount Sims Old School Mix) – 4:44
8. D2 "Nothing Fails" (Tracy Young's Underground Dub) – 8:36
- Digital single (2023)
1. "Nothing Fails" (Radio Edit) – 3:46
2. "Nothing Fails" (Nevins Radio Mix) – 4:00
3. "Nothing Fails" (Peter Rauhofer's Classic House Mix) – 8:24
4. "Nothing Fails" (Nevins Big Room Rock Mix) – 6:44
5. "Nothing Fails" (Tracy Young's Underground Mix) – 7:29
6. "Nothing Fails" (Nevins Global Dub) – 7:45
7. "Nothing Fails" (Jackie's in Love in the Club Mix) – 7:28
8. "Nothing Fails" (Tracy Young's Underground Dub) – 8:40
9. "Nobody Knows Me" (Peter Rauhofer's Private Life Mix Part 1) – 8:07
10. "Nobody Knows Me" (Above & Beyond 12" Mix) – 8:45
11. "Nobody Knows Me" (Mount Sims Italo Kiss Mix) – 5:26

== Credits and personnel ==
Credits for "Nothing Fails" are adapted from American Life liner notes.

- Madonna – lead vocals, songwriting, producer
- Mirwais Ahmadzaï – guitar, producer, programming
- Stuart Price – piano
- Guy Sigsworth – songwriting
- Jem Griffiths – songwriting
- Mark "Spike" Stent – additional production, audio mixing
- London Community Gospel Choir – choir arrangement
- Michael Colombier – string arrangement
- Tim Young – audio mastering

== Charts ==
=== Weekly charts ===
Weekly chart performance for "Nothing Fails"
Chart (2003–2004)	Peak position
Australian Albums (ARIA)	126
Australian Dance (ARIA)	6
Austria (Ö3 Austria Top 40)	51
Belgium (Ultratop 50 Flanders)	50
Belgium (Ultratip Bubbling Under Wallonia)	3
Canadian Singles Chart (Nielsen)	7
Denmark (Tracklisten)	11
France (SNEP)	34
Germany (GfK)	36
Hungary (Dance Top 40)	27
Italy (FIMI)	7
Netherlands (Dutch Top 40 Tipparade) with "Love Profusion"	2
Netherlands (Single Top 100)	49
Romania (Romanian Top 100)	49
Spain (Promusicae)	1
Switzerland (Schweizer Hitparade)	41
US Dance Club Songs (Billboard)	1
US Hot Dance Singles Sales (Billboard) with "Nobody Knows Me"	1

=== Year-end charts ===
Year-end chart performance for "Nothing Fails"
Chart (2004)	Position
US Dance Club Play (Billboard)	4
US Dance Singles Sales (Billboard)	2

== Release history ==
Release dates and formats for "Nothing Fails"
Region	Date	Format	Label	Ref(s).
United States	October 27, 2003	Contemporary hit radio; hot AC radio	Warner Bros.	
Australia	December 15, 2003	CD single	Warner Bros.	
Germany	December 15, 2003	CD single	Warner Bros.	
United Kingdom	February 24, 2004	CD single	Warner Bros.	

== See also ==
- List of number-one singles of 2003 (Spain)
- List of number-one dance singles of 2004 (U.S.)

== Bibliography ==
- Friskics-Warren, Bill (2006), I'll Take You There: Pop Music and the Urge for Transcendence, Continuum International Publishing Group, ISBN 9780826419217
- O'Brien, Lucy (2007), Madonna: Like an Icon, Bantam Press, ISBN 978-0-593-05547-2
- Rooksby, Rikky (2004), The Complete Guide to the Music of Madonna, Omnibus Press, ISBN 0-7119-9883-3
- Taraborrelli, J. Randy (2008), Madonna: An Intimate Biography, Pan Books, ISBN 978-0-330-45446-9
- Timmerman, Dirk (2007), Madonna Live! Secret Re-inventions and Confessions on Tour, Maklu Publications Inc, ISBN 978-90-8595-002-8
