= Love Profusion =

2003 single by Madonna

Single by Madonna

from the album American Life
- B-side: "Nobody Knows Me"
- Released: December 8, 2003
- Recorded: 2002
- Studio: Olympic Recording (Barnes, London)
- Genre: Electronica; folk
- Length: 3:37
- Label: Maverick; Warner Bros.
- Songwriters: Madonna; Mirwais Ahmadzaï
- Producers: Madonna; Mirwais Ahmadzaï

Madonna singles chronology
"Nothing Fails" (2003)	"Love Profusion" (2003)	"Hung Up" (2005)

Music video
- "Love Profusion" on YouTube

"Love Profusion" is a song by American singer and songwriter Madonna for her ninth studio album, American Life (2003). Written and produced by Madonna and Mirwais Ahmadzaï, it was released as the fourth and final single from the album on December 8, 2003, by Maverick Records. "Love Profusion" was first premiered during the release of the album on AOL. It later received a number of remixes, which were also released alongside the single. The song contains rhythm from a four piece bass drum, with acoustic guitar riffs and Madonna's voice backed by a male vocal during the chorus. Ahmadzaï used the stutter edit to create a new groove. Dedicated to Madonna's then-husband, Guy Ritchie, the song's lyrics deal with Madonna's confusion regarding American culture.

After its release, "Love Profusion" received generally favorable reviews from music critics. Reviewers called it the highlight of American Life, complimenting its fusion of dance beats and acoustic guitar, although some thought that it was too similar to other songs from the album. "Love Profusion" failed to chart in the US Billboard Hot 100 like its predecessors from American Life, but it reached number one on the singles sales chart and the dance chart. Internationally, the single reached number one in Spain as well as the top five in Canada and Italy.

The accompanying music video of the song was directed by Luc Besson and was shot at Warner Bros. Studios in Burbank, California. It featured Madonna in front of a greenscreen effect with her walking through a city, until walking into a surreal background, filled with red flowers, sea and fairies. "Love Profusion" also appeared on Estée Lauder "Beyond Paradise" fragrance television commercial, which was similar to the music video and was directed by Besson, but featured supermodel Carolyn Murphy. The advertisement debuted in more than 10,000 cinemas across the country. Madonna did not perform the song during any promotional appearances or on any of her tours; she rehearsed it for 2004's Re-Invention World Tour but it was dropped from the setlist.

== Background and remixes ==
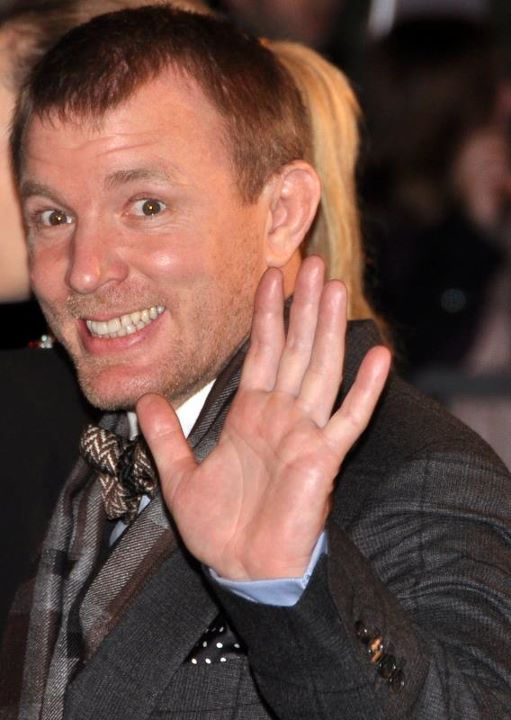
"Love Profusion" was dedicated to Madonna's then-husband, director Guy Ritchie.

According to biographer Lucy O'Brien, nothingness is the main theme of American Life; it appears in the titles of songs like "Nobody Knows Me" and "Nothing Fails" and in the repetition of the word "no" in "Love Profusion". Madonna's negative tone in this song and throughout the album allowed her to be sarcastic about people's assumptions about her and to emphasize her knowledge of romantic love. The tracks from American Life were released to AOL for digital download. Since Madonna was the "Artist of the Month" at AOL website, "Love Profusion" was premiered there on April 14, 2003, as part of AOL's First Listen program. Several remixes of the song, done by DJs such as The Passengerz, Craig J., Blow-Up and Ralphi Rosario, were included on physical releases of the single around the world, released on December 8, 2003, in the United Kingdom and March 16, 2004, in the United States.

The remixes were premiered by Warner Bros. Records at the 2003 Winter Music Conference in Miami, where Peter Rauhofer, Rosario and Blow-Up played their remixes of "Love Profusion". Blow-Up also debuted their own version of "Good Boys" (2003) by Blondie, and remixes of Madonna's previous single, "Hollywood". An extended version of the "Love Profusion" remix, titled "Headcleanr Rock Mix", was also included on Madonna's remix album Remixed & Revisited (2003). Michael Paoletta of Billboard named the remix (along with the "Mount Sims Old School Mix" of "Nobody Knows Me") as the highlight of Remixed and Revisited, calling it "a new-wave-styled-rock tune", a "blast of fresh air" and an "essential listening experience". John Payne from LA Weekly compares the lyrics of the song ("Only you make me feel good") with the cautionary lyrics of "X-Static Process", in which the protagonist loses herself in her lover's ego. The "Headcleanr Rock Mix" was included on the setlist during the rehearsals of Madonna's 2004 Re-Invention World Tour, but it was ultimately not included in the show.

== Recording and composition ==
"Love Profusion" was composed and produced by Madonna and Mirwais Ahmadzaï. The song is dedicated to Madonna's then-husband, director Guy Ritchie. The recording sessions for American Life started in late 2001, but was put on hold as Madonna filmed Swept Away in Malta and starred in the West End play Up for Grabs. She returned to the Olympic Recording Studios in late 2002 and finished the sessions.

'Love Profusion' (2003)
A 20 second sample of "Love Profusion", starting from the beginning, with Madonna's voice singing the line: "There are too many questions", as the vocals are accompanied by a "strummy" acoustic guitar.

The mixing for the track was done by Mark "Spike" Stent at the Westlake Recording Studios at West Hollywood, California, and Tim Young did the mastering of the song at Metropolis Studios in London. Tom Hannen and Simon Changer served as assistant engineers during the recording. Ahmadzaï played the guitars and provided its backing vocals. According to the sheet music published at Sheetmusicplus.com, "Love Profusion" is written in common time with a moderately fast tempo of 120 beats per minute. According to a writer from The Arizona Republic, it is an electronica-meets-folk song and is composed in the key of B minor with Madonna's voice spanning from B_{3} to F♯_{5}.

Ahmadzai used the technique of making the music freeze midrhythm throughout American Life, including "Love Profusion". One technique was the stutter edit, which Ahmadzaï clarified was not characteristic of his production and recording. "People get upset because they think it is not natural to skip and stutter the music. But I do it because it is natural. The stuttering can help you create a new groove", he said. The track starts with a "strummy" acoustic guitar introduction, as described by Michael Paoletta from Billboard, on the four-chord progression of Bm–F♯m–A–E sequence. The folk rock inspired song has elements of electronica and folk at its core. Its rhythm is produced by a four piece bass drum—which fades in and out abruptly—and atmospheric synth-strings, which are added later in the song.

Madonna sings in the first verse: "There are too many options/There is no consolation/I have lost my illusions/What I want is an explanation." According to Rolling Stone, although not explicitly stated, the lines confirm Madonna's belief that American culture will not "give her an explanation", so she had rejected American values, and along with them her own values. She repeats the line "I got you under my skin" while a male voice acts as the backing for the track. The song ends with Madonna singing the words "feel good" a capella. The lyrics of the song deals with questions, solutions, resurrections, confusions and other broad topics of a neo-philosophical nature. Edna Gundersen of USA Today compared its composition and Madonna's performance with a love letter. The Advocate called it "a plaintive love letter to her husband".

== Critical reception ==
"Blessedly, there's plenty of soul elsewhere on American Life. For most of the gorgeous 'Love Profusion', Madonna wraps her voice — that candy-coated piece of plastic we've come to know and love — around a simple acoustic-guitar hook and some achy lyrics: 'There is no comprehension/There is real isolation/There is so much destruction/What I want is a celebration.'

— Josh Tyrangiel from Time talking about the song.

"Love Profusion" received generally positive reviews from music critics. Michael Paoletta from Billboard described the song as a "sparse number" and said that it was a "good fit" for the radio. Ken Tucker from Entertainment Weekly called it "lovely". Ian Youngs of BBC News commented that "Love Profusion" is one of the highlights from the album, with layers of dance beats and acoustic guitar that made it a more complete song. A writer for Daily Record described it as a "stunningly beautiful ballad" and considered it as one of the many highlights from American Life.

Sal Cinquemani from Slant Magazine called it "dull" and wrote that "it was reinvented into a vibrant piece of guitar-driven pop-rock by Ray Carroll." Ben Ratliff from Rolling Stone deduced that with lyrics like "I got you under my skin", Madonna conveyed the theme of gaining transcendence through detachment, "but finally American Life comes across as defeatist more than anything else". Dan Aquilante from New York Post was dismissive of the track, saying that although there was nothing wrong with the guitar-driven composition of the track, it was not different from the strings and orchestration of other tracks from American Life, like "Nothing Fails" or "Easy Ride". Robert Hilburn, while reviewing American Life for The Press of Atlantic City, listed the track as one of the songs that could "save" the album from being a "profound fail". Ross Raihala, writing for The Olympian listed the track as a standout on American Life, in contrast to the "dreary, directionless dance numbers and plodding ballads" on the album.

Caroline Bansal from musicOMH gave a mixed review for the song, feeling that the singer's vocals over the Spanish guitar was monotonous. She felt that the chorus was more melodic but it was the lyrics and the dance beats which did not complete the track. Bansal said that "Love Profusion" could have been composed better. Ed Howard from Stylus Magazine wrote that "Love Profusion", along with the song "Intervention", "address Madonna's marriage to director Guy Ritchie", and "find the once-cynical pop star surprisingly open and emotional, which prompts her to spit out cliché after cliché as she tells us how happy she is". Alan Braidwood from BBC Music felt that the song was the most straight forward dance track on the album. He added that "this is one of those [songs] which could become a favorite and it feels like a classic upbeat Madonna song. It fuses the message behind the song American Life with Mirwais' beats and acoustic elements really well". Sean O'Brien from The People complimented the song for its "great melody and acoustic guitar flavor to it", and deduced that it would be a hit in the night clubs. Dan Gennoe from Dotmusic website gave a positive review of the track, calling "Love Profusion", along with "Intervention" and "X-Static Process" from American Life, "gracious" and "beautiful" songs. In 2012, website AfterElton.com listed "Love Profusion" at number 91 on their list of "The 100 Greatest Madonna Songs". Writing for The Guardian, Jude Rogers placed "Love Profusion" at number 58 on her ranking of Madonna's singles, in honor of her 60th birthday, writing that "the tune begins labouredly, but digs in". Chuck Arnold from Entertainment Weekly listed "Love Profusion" as the singer's 58th best single; "this ray of sunshine from American Life is one of Madonna’s finest folktronica moments".

== Chart performance ==
"Love Profusion" did not chart on the US Billboard Hot 100 or the Bubbling Under Hot 100 Singles, making it the third consecutive single from American Life to fail to chart in the US. However, the song peaked at number 41 and "The Passengers Mix" topped on the Hot Dance Club Play chart. The song reached No. 4 on the Hot Singles Sales and topped the Hot Dance Singles Sales charts for five weeks. At the year-end Hot Dance Singles Sales recap, "Love Profusion" was at number three position, while "Me Against the Music" was at number one and "Nothing Fails" was at number two. Billboard reported that Madonna was the first artist in its chart history to have the top three Dance Sales songs. The song also ranked at number 24 on the year-end Dance Club Play tally. In Canada, the song peaked at number three on the Canadian Singles Chart.

In the United Kingdom, the song debuted at its peak of number eleven on December 20, 2003, with sales of 15,361 copies, becoming Madonna's first song to miss the top ten since "One More Chance" (1996). The following week, it dropped to number 33 on the chart, ultimately remaining there for six weeks. "Love Profusion" reached a peak of number 33 on the UK Airplay Chart in five weeks, but quickly descended. As of August 2008, the song had sold 41,025 copies according to the Official Charts Company. In Australia, the song debuted at its peak of number 25 on December 28, 2003. It remained on the chart for another seven weeks. "Love Profusion" debuted at number 27 on the French Singles Chart on November 30, 2003. In its second week, it reached its peak of number 25. The song was popular in Italy, peaking at number five on the Italian Singles Chart, staying on the chart for a total of twenty weeks. The song also achieved commercial success in Spain, debuting at number one on its singles chart. On the Swiss Singles Chart, the song peaked at number 31, falling out of the chart after a total of eleven weeks.

== Music video ==
Madonna being covered by fairies at the end of the official music video

A few weeks before the official music video's release in November 2003, Madonna's manager Caresse Henry confirmed video plans for "Love Profusion". It was directed by Luc Besson and shot in September 2003, at Warner Bros. Studios in Burbank, California, and EuropaCorp in Paris, France. Besson later directed Madonna in the 2007 animated film Arthur and the Invisibles. "There are a lot of special effects. I talked to things that weren't there – which is what you do when you're doing green-screen or blue-screen stuff. There's going to be a lot of fairies dancing around me. Isn't that exciting? I always have a lot of fairies dancing around me", Madonna commented about the music video. Besson would later say he was brought onto the project with little notice after Madonna nixed the original director of the project. "'I have to make this video tomorrow and the director sucks’ — that’s how she speaks!'" he remembered her telling him, a memory he shared during a masterclass at the Venice film festival. He said he listened to the song for 11 hours on the plane to the shoot.

The video premiered in the US on Feb to the shoot. e, it was streamed on Yahoo!, MSN, Windows Media, Apple, MTV, VH1, iFilm and Madonna.com. In 2009, the video was included on Madonna's compilation, Celebration: The Video Collection.

The video begins with Madonna walking at night in the middle of the street of an American city surrounded by skyscrapers and wind. Then she finds herself in another dimension, as moving flowers surround her. As the video advances, Madonna walks on other different kinds of roads. She walks on a path of red flowers in the sky, and then walks on her knees on a deep, blue colored sea, as she is followed by little white fairies. At the end of the video, when there is destruction in the real dimension, Madonna finds peace and is surrounded by the fairies. When they go away, Madonna disappears altogether.

== Usage in media ==
"Love Profusion" was used on the Estée Lauder "Beyond Paradise" fragrance television advertisement. It was also directed by Luc Besson and shot the same day as the official music video. The Estée Lauder advertisement featured supermodel Carolyn Murphy wandering through a world full of water, and surrounded by flowers and fairies while "Love Profusion" played in the background. The 30 second commercial debuted in more than 10,000 cinemas in September, while the television version of the advertisement aired on MTV, VH1, E! and Style Network. Estée Lauder group president Patrick Bousquet-Chauvanne explained that they "wanted the advertising to be groundbreaking for Estée Lauder... The association of Luc Besson, Madonna and Carolyn Murphy will make for an exceptional visual and acoustic experience for movie and television audiences around the world." The Olympian's Ross Raihala wrote that it made sense that "Love Profusion" was used as the soundtrack for the commercial, and felt like it was another attempt by Madonna to "salvage her career" following the commercial disappointment of American Life.

== Track listings and formats ==
- Australian CD maxi-single
1. "Love Profusion" (Album Version) – 3:38
2. "Love Profusion" (Ralphi Rosario House Vocal Mix) – 6:02
3. "Nobody Knows Me" (Above & Beyond 12" Mix) – 8:46
- French 2-track CD single
1. "Love Profusion" (Album Version) – 3:38
2. "Love Profusion" (Headcleanr Rock Mix) – 3:16
- UK vinyl single
1. "Love Profusion" (Passengerz Club Mix) – 9:34
2. "Nobody Knows Me" (Above & Beyond 12" Mix) – 8:46
- UK & European CD maxi-single 1
1. "Love Profusion" (Album Version) – 3:38
2. "Nothing Fails" (Radio Edit) – 3:48
3. "Love Profusion" (Passengerz Club Mix) – 7:01
- UK & European CD maxi-single 2
1. "Love Profusion" (Album Version) – 3:38
2. "Love Profusion" (Ralphi Rosario House Vocal Mix edit) – 6:02
3. "Nobody Knows Me" (Above & Beyond 12" Mix) – 8:46
- US & European CD maxi-single
1. "Love Profusion" (Blow-Up Mix) – 6:11
2. "Love Profusion" (The Passengerz Club Profusion) – 9:34
3. "Love Profusion" (Ralphi Rosario House Vocal Extended) – 7:29
4. "Love Profusion" (Craig J.'s "Good Vibe" Mix) – 7:14
5. "Love Profusion" (Ralphi Rosario Big Room Vox Extended) – 10:01
6. "Love Profusion" (Ralphi Rosario Big Room Dub) – 8:57
7. "Nothing Fails" (Peter's Lost In Space Mix) – 8:36
- US vinyl single
1. "Love Profusion" (The Passengerz Club Profusion) – 9:34
2. "Love Profusion" (Blow-Up Mix) – 6:11
3. "Love Profusion" (Ralphi Rosario House Vocal Extended) – 7:29
4. "Love Profusion" (Ralphi Rosario Big Room Dub) – 8:57
5. "Love Profusion" (The Passengerz Dub Profusion) – 8:04
6. "Love Profusion" (Craig J.'s "Good Vibe" Mix) – 7:14
7. "Love Profusion" (Ralphi Rosario Big Room Vox Extended) – 10:01
- Digital single (2023)
1. "Love Profusion" – 3:38
2. "Love Profusion" (Headcleanr Rock Mix) – 3:16
3. "Love Profusion" (Blow-Up Mix) – 6:08
4. "Love Profusion" (The Passengerz Club Profusion) – 9:32
5. "Love Profusion" (Ralphi Rosario House Vocal Extended) – 7:29
6. "Love Profusion" (Craig J.'s "Good Vibe" Mix) – 7:14
7. "Love Profusion" (Ralphi Rosario Big Room Vox Extended/Revised) – 9:59
8. "Love Profusion" (Ralphi Rosario Big Room Dub) – 8:57
9. "Love Profusion" (The Passengerz Dub Profusion) – 8:03
10. "Nothing Fails" (Peter's Lost In Space Mix) – 8:36

== Credits and personnel ==
Credits and personnel are adapted from American Life album liner notes.

- Madonna – vocals, songwriter, producer
- Mirwais Ahmadzaï – backing vocals, producer, programming, guitar
- Mike "Spike" Stent – mixing
- Tim Young – mastering
- Tom Hannen – assistant engineer
- Simon Changer – assistant engineer

== Charts ==
=== Weekly charts ===
Weekly chart performance for "Love Profusion"
Chart (2003–2004)	Peak position
Australia (ARIA)	25
Canada (Nielsen SoundScan)	3
CIS Airplay (TopHit) The Passengerz Hell's Kitchen Mix	85
Croatia (HRT)	7
Czech Republic (ČNS IFPI)	21
France (SNEP)	25
Greece (IFPI)	3
Hungary (Rádiós Top 40)	27
Ireland (IRMA)	22
Italy (FIMI)	5
Netherlands (Dutch Top 40 Tipparade) With "Nothing Fails"	2
Polish Airplay (ZPAV)	1
Romania (Romanian Top 100)	99
Russia Airplay (TopHit) The Passengerz Hell's Kitchen Mix	4
Scottish Singles Sales (Official Charts)	13
Spain (Promusicae)	1
Switzerland (Schweizer Hitparade)	31
UK Singles (Official Charts)	11
US Dance Club Songs (Billboard)	41
US Dance Club Songs (Billboard) The Passenger Mix	1
US Dance Airplay (Billboard)	20
US Hot Dance Singles Sales (Billboard)	1

=== Year-end charts ===
Year-end chart performance for "Love Profusion"
Chart (2004)	Position
Australian Dance (ARIA)	23
Italy (FIMI)	30
Russia Airplay (TopHit) The Passengerz Hell's Kitchen Mix	165
US Dance Club Play (Billboard)	24
US Dance Singles Sales (Billboard)	3

== Sales ==
Sales for "Love Profusion"
Region	Certification	Certified units/sales
United Kingdom	—	41,025

== Release history ==
Release dates and formats for "Love Profusion"
Region	Date	Format	Label	Ref.
United Kingdom	December 8, 2003	CD single	Warner Bros.	
Australia	December 15, 2003	CD single	Warner Bros.	
France	February 5, 2004	CD single	Warner Bros.	
Germany	March 16, 2004	CD single	Warner Bros.	
United States	March 23, 2004	12-inch single	Warner Bros.	

== See also ==
- List of number-one dance singles of 2004 (U.S.)

== Bibliography ==
- O'Brien, Lucy (2007), Madonna: Like an Icon, Bantam Press, ISBN 978-0-593-05547-2
- Rooksby, Rikky (2004), The Complete Guide to the Music of Madonna, Omnibus Press, ISBN 0-7119-9883-3
- Oleksy, Elżbieta H.; Rydzewska, Joanna (2004), Representing gender in cultures, Peter Lang, ISBN 978-3-631-50667-7
