= List of number-one singles of 2003 (Spain) =

This is a list of the Spanish PROMUSICAE Top 20 Singles number-ones of 2003.

Singles
- Marey – "Tu no me veras llorar"
  - 1 week (December 22, 2002 – January 4, 2003)
- Danni Úbeda – "Bésame"
  - 3 weeks (January 5 – January 25)
- Vega – "Quiero ser tú"
  - 1 week (January 26 – February 1)
- Tony Santos – "Un hombre así"
  - 1 week (February 2 – February 8)
- Miguel Nández – "Amiga soledad"
  - 9 weeks (February 9 – April 12)
- Beth – "Dime"
  - 3 weeks (April 13 – April 26)
- Hugo – "El templo de tu cuerpo"
  - 3 weeks (April 27 – Mai 17)
- Ricky Martin – "Jaleo"
  - 4 weeks (May 18 – June 14)
- Dinio – "Hasiendo el amor"
  - 1 week (June 15 – June 21)
- La buena Vida – "Los planetas"
  - 2 weeks (June 22 – July 5)
- Joaquín Sabina – "Motivos de un sentimiento [Himno centenario del Atlético de Madrid]"
  - 3 weeks (July 6 – July 27), 4 weeks in total
- Fran Perea – "Uno mas son siete"
  - 14 weeks (July 28 – November 1), 16 weeks in total
- Pecos – "Pecos Collection"
  - 1 week (November 2 – November 8)
- Kylie Minogue – "Slow"
  - 1 week (November 9 – November 15)
- Britney Spears feat. Madonna – "Me Against the Music"
  - 2 weeks (November 16 – November 29)
- David Bustamante – "Devuélveme el aire"
  - 2 weeks (November 30 – December 13)
- Madonna – "Nothing Fails"
  - 2 weeks (December 14 – December 27)
- Fran Perea – "Uno mas son siete"
  - 1 week (December 28, 2003 – January 3, 2004), 16 weeks in total

== See also ==
- 2003 in music
- List of number-one hits (Spain)
