= Remixed & Revisited =

Remix album by Madonna
- Released: November 24, 2003
- Recorded: 1985–2003
- Length: 29:27
- Labels: Maverick; Warner Bros.
- Producers: Madonna; Mirwais Ahmadzaï

Madonna chronology
American Life (2003)	Remixed & Revisited (2003)	Confessions on a Dance Floor (2005)

Remixed & Revisited is the second remix album by American singer and songwriter Madonna. It was released on November 24, 2003, by Maverick Records and Warner Bros. Records. The album contains four songs, in remixed form, from her 2003 ninth studio album American Life and a previously unreleased song, "Your Honesty", originally written and recorded for her 1994 sixth studio album Bedtime Stories. The other tracks included are the live performance of "Like a Virgin" and "Hollywood" on the 2003 MTV Video Music Awards—which ended with Madonna kissing co-performers Britney Spears and Christina Aguilera—and a remix of 1985 single "Into the Groove".

The release peaked at number 115 on the Billboard 200 in the United States, while reaching the number one in Portugal and top-five in Denmark, Greece and Italy. It received mixed reviews from critics; "Your Honesty" was generally the only song to receive praise. The remix album also marked the closing release under her contract with Maverick Records.

== Background ==
In 2003, Madonna planned to release a special commemorative box set to celebrate her twentieth anniversary in the music business and the release of her first studio album, Madonna, in 1983. The plan for the box set was eventually cancelled and Remixed & Revisited was conceived in its place. The compilation contains remixed versions of four songs from American Life and a previously unreleased song called "Your Honesty"; co-written and co-produced by Dallas Austin, the track is from Madonna's sixth studio album Bedtime Stories era (1994). "Nobody Knows Me" was remixed by performance artist Mount Sims, Headcleanr mixed "American Life" and "Love Profusion". DJ Jason Nevins remixed "Nothing Fails", while "Into the Hollywood Groove" was created by The Passengerz. On December 9, 2003, Warner Music France released a box set version containing both the remix collection and the original album American Life in a cardboard sleeve entitled Édition Spéciale 2CDs: American Life + Remixed & Revisited.

=== 2003 MTV VMA performance ===
The medley track "Like a Virgin/Hollywood" was performed during the opening of the 2003 MTV Video Music Awards on August 27, 2003, where Madonna was joined by Britney Spears, Christina Aguilera, and Missy Elliott. The performance started with Spears appearing on stage on top of a giant wedding cake while wearing a wedding gown and veil; she sang the first few lines of "Like a Virgin" before Aguilera appeared from behind the cake and joined her. Madonna then emerged from the cake wearing a black coat and a hat and started singing "Hollywood" before proceeding to kiss Spears and Aguilera on the lips. Missy Elliott came out from a wedding chapel to sing her song "Work It" halfway through the performance. The kiss generated strong reaction from the media. Feminist author Camille Paglia described the moment as great; she noted that the kiss was like Madonna saying to Spears, "I'm passing the torch to you." However, according to her, Spears could not take advantage of the kiss as later her career and lifestyle came under immense media scrutiny and criticism. Paglia said that "literally from that kiss, from that moment onward, Britney has spiraled out of control. It's like Madonna gave her the kiss of death!" Madonna commented on the kiss; "I am the mommy pop star and she is the baby pop star. And I am kissing her to pass my energy on to her." This performance was listed by Blender magazine as one of the twenty-five sexiest music moments on television history. MTV listed the performance as the number-one opening moments in the history of MTV Video Music Awards.

== Critical reception ==
Professional ratings
Review scores
Source	Rating
AllMusic	2/5 stars
Boston Herald	3.5/4 stars
Daily Breeze	2.5/5 stars
Entertainment Weekly	C+
Naples Daily News	3.5/5 stars
People	1.5/5 stars
Rolling Stone	2/5 stars
St. Louis Post-Dispatch	5/5 stars
The Miami Herald	2/5 stars
The News-Sentinel	3.5/5 stars

Stephen Thomas Erlewine of AllMusic felt that the presence of a "strong hook and a strong sense of fun" was missing from the compilation, except for the song "Your Honesty", which he declared as the best track despite feeling its beats to be a little outdated. He compared the work of the remixers as "as subtle as a jackhammer, whether it's on the metallic-flaked 'American Life' by Headcleanr or the '90s-retro Nevins mix of 'Nothing Fails'. On all these mixes, Madonna sounds as if she's out of step with the music of 2003". Erlewine also compared Spears' vocals with that of Madonna's during her early days and Aguilera's with that of Cher's. Nathan Brackett of Rolling Stone commented that the release "improves upon American Life's standout single 'Love Profusion', but the rest botches an opportunity to revive interest on its parent album". Fabian from Daily Breeze commented that Remixed & Revisited "is an amusing collection of novelties." Sarah Crompton from Boston Herald proclaimed the album to be "more fun than her full-length 2003 offering American Life." The Malay Mail said that the remixes from the album are for "true blue Madonna fans." Phil Udell from Hot Press called it an "impressive seven-track collection". An editor from The Journal Gazette expressed "It's a bundle of energetic fun, even if Madonna sounds a little shaky".

A writer for The Miami Herald was negative towards the release saying that "Madonna's latest misstep is this pointless Remixed & Revisited seven-track EP in which she tries to resell five songs from her recent American Life CD to an audience who deserve far better efforts from the queen, than this." Ricardo Baca from The Denver Post compared Madonna to actress Drew Barrymore on the cover of the EP, feeling that the singer looked foolish and that the tracks were weak attempts at "spicing up" the already non-commercial songs from American Life. Kevin C. Johnson from St. Louis Post-Dispatch said that with the remixes, Madonna "put some life" back into the songs of American Life, complementing "Your Honesty" and wondering why it was left from the Bedtime Stories sessions. Keith Caulfield of Billboard was impressed with "Your Honesty" and the remixes of "Love Profusion" and "Nobody Knows Me". He said, "Die-hard fans, even those unenamored of American Life will dig this EP." New Straits Times's Christie Leo, said "the remixes are more vivid and fleshed out, especially 'Nothing Fails' and 'Love Profusion'". In his book The Essential Rock Discography, Martin Charles Strong called the release as "equally dispensable as its parent album".

== Commercial performance ==
In the United States, Remixed & Revisited debuted at number 115 on the Billboard 200, selling 22,000 copies in its first week. It also debuted and peaked at number 128 on the Top Comprehensive Albums chart. According to Nielsen SoundScan, the EP has sold 114,000 copies as of August 2005 in the United States. The Nevins' mix of "Nothing Fails" charted on the Canadian Singles Chart at seven and topped the Hot Dance Club Play chart. It also debuted on the album charts of Belgium, in Flanders and Wallonia, and Switzerland. The album charted in Italy as a single, reaching a peak of number two. It also charted in Finland and Denmark as an EP on the singles charts.

== Track listing ==
Remixed & Revisited track listing
No.	Title	Writer(s)	Remixer(s)	Length
1.	"Nothing Fails" (Nevins mix)	Madonna; Guy Sigsworth; Jem Griffiths	Jason Nevins	3:50
2.	"Love Profusion" (Headcleanr Rock mix)	Madonna; Ahmadzaï	Ray Carroll	3:16
3.	"Nobody Knows Me" (Mount Sims Old School mix)	Madonna; Ahmadzaï	Mount Sims	4:44
4.	"American Life" (Headcleanr Rock mix)	Madonna; Ahmadzaï	Ray Carroll	4:01
5.	"Like a Virgin / Hollywood Medley" (2003 MTV VMA Performance featuring Britney Spears, Christina Aguilera and Missy Elliott)	Billy Steinberg; Tom Kelly / Madonna; Ahmadzaï	—	5:34
6.	"Into the Hollywood Groove" (The Passengerz Mix featuring Missy Elliott)	Madonna; Ahmadzaï; Stephen Bray	Chris Griffin	3:42
7.	"Your Honesty" (previously unreleased)	Madonna; Dallas Austin	Daniel Abraham	4:07
Total length:				29:27

== Personnel ==
Adapted from the Remixed & Revisited AllMusic credits

Production

- Madonna – producer
- Mirwais Ahmadzaï – producer (except "Your Honesty")
- Dallas Austin – producer ("Your Honesty")
- Ray Carroll – additional production; remixer ("American Life", "Love Profusion")
- Mount Sims – additional production; remixer ("Nobody Knows Me")
- Jason Nevins – additional production; remixer ("Nothing Fails")
- Vin Nigro – additional production ("Nothing Fails")
- Joe "Magic" – additional production ("Nothing Fails")
- Soul Diggaz – remixer ("Into the Hollywood Groove")
- The Passengerz – editor ("Into the Hollywood Groove")
- Chris Griffin – mixing ("Into the Hollywood Groove")
- Pat Kraus – mastering

Additional musicians

- Missy Elliott – "Into the Hollywood Groove", "Like a Virgin"/"Hollywood"
- Christina Aguilera – "Like a Virgin"/"Hollywood"
- Britney Spears – "Like a Virgin"/"Hollywood"

Design

- Bret Healey – art direction
- Kevin Reagan – art direction
- Regan Cameron – photography

== Charts ==
=== Weekly charts ===
Weekly chart performance for Remixed & Revisited
Chart (2003–2004)	Peak position
Australian Dance Albums (ARIA)	5
Belgian Albums (Ultratop Flanders)	61
Belgian Albums (Ultratop Wallonia)	37
Canadian Albums (Nielsen)	74
Denmark (Tracklisten) Charted as a single	3
Finland (Suomen virallinen lista) Charted as a single	12
Greece (IFPI) Charted as a single	2
Italy (FIMI) Charted as a single	2
Japanese Albums (Oricon)	33
Portugal (AFP) Charted as a single	1
Swiss Albums (Schweizer Hitparade)	80
UK Budget Albums (OCC)	3
UK Dance Albums (OCC)	1
US Billboard 200	115

=== Year-end charts ===
2004 year-end chart performance for Remixed & Revisited
Chart (2004)	Position
Italy (FIMI)	41

== Sales ==
Sales for "Remixed & Revisited"
Region	Certification	Certified units/sales
Japan	—	9,000
United States	—	114,000
