= Up for Grabs (play) =

2002 play by David Williamson

- Written by: David Williamson
- Genre: Theatre play

Up For Grabs is a 2002 play by Australian playwright David Williamson.

Singer and actress Madonna starred in the play's London West End theatre version.

== Background ==
Williamson's play focuses on the growing Australian art market from 1990 to the present, the auction sales of which increased from $17 million in 1990 to $90 million in 2002. According to investment analysts, art has been the fourth best-performing asset in Australia for the ten years to 2002. This pushed contemporary Australian art prices to new highs, with Brett Whiteley's "The Jacaranda Tree" fetching $1.9 million in 1999.

The boom was fueled by the Dot com boom years, and Williamson also addresses six of the seven deadly sins (Pride, Lust, Avarice (Greed), Envy, Wrath, Gluttony), to address the "anything goes" personal and sexual excesses of the time. It is a play of bad manners, an analysis of how wealth and power can corrupt the arts.

== Plot ==
The story deals with the efforts of Simone, a young fledgling art dealer, to sell a painting by Australian artist Brett Whitely for a record $2 million and thereby establish herself at the “big end of town.” This ambition turns to desperation when she signs a contract guaranteeing this price, putting both her own and her partner Gerry's assets on the line.

Simone, who has a small list of clients with the sort of money needed for this kind of transaction, sets up an unofficial auction to push up the price. Her prospective buyers include Dawn Grey, a corporate art buyer still frustrated that she did not have what it takes to be a great artist; Kel and Mindy, a young dotcom couple with more money than sense; and Manny and Felicity, a wealthy but unhappy couple looking for a suitable trophy.

The game of playing each against all becomes increasingly sticky for the inexperienced Simone, who ends up compromising herself sexually on more than one occasion: “You are a hooker aren't you? You're trying to sell me something for more than it's worth and you'll do anything to get your price,” says Manny. Simone pretends to be an honest art dealer, but then she gives in to her clients' whims in the hopes that this will seal the deal.

When the moment calls for honesty, Simone decides to warn the naïve Mindy, who has genuinely fallen in love with the art dealer, that the Whitely is grossly over-priced. Simone advises her not to put in a bid, but Manny has decided to pull out of the bidding, leaving her dangling dangerously close to bankruptcy.

In the end, Simone gets her price from the corporate art buyer, Dawn Grey, who is happy to see her clients pay $2 million as a kind of vengeful act against the corporate world. While Simone does not lose a cent, she does not make anything either. She tells the audience that the lessons learned are priceless and economic success is guaranteed because the sale will bring other paintings and clients her way. She has made it to the “big end of town.”

== Versions ==
- 2001 Australian production, including review
- 2002 London West End theatre production starring Madonna, who made her West End debut in the production. Rewrites relocated the play's action from Sydney to New York City, among other changes. Madonna herself, contributed to some of these changes.
- 2016 Australian production in Hobart, staged at the Playhouse Theatre by Hobart Repertory Theatre Society.

== West End version ==
The West End version, staged at Wyndhams Theatre in London, opened on May 23, 2002 and ran until July 13, 2002.

Cast in order of appearance

- Loren: Madonna (billed as 'Madonna Ritchie')
- Gerry: Tom Irwin
- Mindy: Megan Dodds
- Kel: Danny Pino
- Dawn: Sian Thomas
- Manny: Michael Lerner
- Phyllis: Debora Weston
- Direction Laurence Boswell

David Williamson later reflected on the experience:

I was there for the first week of rehearsals in London when Madonna was playing the lead role... It was fascinating to see how she operated. She was very aware of her power and exercised it and demanded rewrites that she assumed would suit her character. I either did them or the play didn’t go on. I think the Australian version of the play was probably better.

=== Reception ===
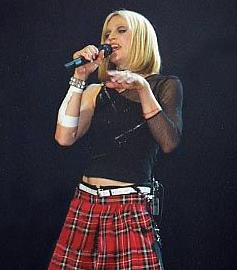
Madonna pictured during the Drowned World Tour (2001). Up for Grabs marked her London stage debut, while her participation helped sell-out the play.

Up for Grabs debuted with notable mass media attention thanks to Madonna's play role which represented her London stage debut. After the announcement of her participation, Wyndham's Theatre informed it had already sold a "frightening" number of tickets, and in matters of 10 days, the play was a sell-out before its official debut. Many people queued in the rain in hopes of getting returned tickets. With ticketed pricing at least £150 a seat, this prompted Playbill to anticipate a record. Most expensive tickets were priced at $750. Playwright David Williamson admitted Madonna's presence guaranteed a sell-out over the play's ten-week run, commenting: "It was my only sold-out West End experience; people were scalping tickets for 500 quid. I can't claim that was because of me, they all came to see Madonna".

The play earned mixed to positive responses. Giving the play two out of five stars, Michael Billington from The Guardian praised its design and commented "Madonna is not positively bad". Madonna's acting garnered mixed to negative response from critics, although she received a standing ovation by theatergoers in its first show. According to Hello!, Madonna "delivered a flawless performance that surpassed all expectation", even the success "confounded the critics who, after seeing preview performances, had reported that the singer's acting skills were not up to the task". The play won a Theatregoers' Choice Awards for Theatre Event of the Year.

== Book sources ==
- Morgan, Michelle (2015). Madonna. Hachette UK. ISBN 978-1472119438.
