= Action television =

Television series genre

The action television genre is a style of film that emerged in the 1960s. As with the action film genre, the action television is at term applied flexibly to present itself in conjunction with various tropes of multiple other genre narratives. This is showcased in early examples of the genre such as Starsky & Hutch (1975–1979) which featured regular sequences of car chases, shoot-outs, explosions, fights and scenes of urban pursuit. The style attaches itself to various other styles of film such as fantasy and horror, with Buffy the Vampire Slayer (1997–2003) and 21st century military themed espionage shows like 24 (2001–2010, 2014) and NCIS.

Unlike the film genre, the action genre for television was described by academic Yvonne Tasker as both was "largely untheorised" and understudied in media academia which she suggested was due to the low cultural status of early television works who developed the style.

== Characteristics ==
Academic Yvonne Tasker described action as a broad television genre was "largely untheorised" in comparison to other television formats more distinct to television such as the soap opera, talk shows, and sitcoms. Studies such as Action TV: Tough-Guys, Smooth Operators and Foxy Chicks (2001) by Bill Osgerby and Anna Gough-Yates did not focus on the historical or formal features of genre.

As with the action film, the action television genre is used flexibly to present itself in conjunction with various tropes of multiple other genres such as The Six Million Dollar Man (1973–1978) which had primarily science fiction and espionage elements and Charlie's Angels (1976–1981) which combined action with crime and investigation narratives. Action plays an important element in fantasy television genres with widely series such as Buffy the Vampire Slayer (1997–2003) and Game of Thrones (2011–2019) which exemplify fantasy with strong horror and action elements.

== History ==
=== American television ===
The serial format of television, involving recurring characters in discrete episodes, began in the United States in the 1950s. During the late 1950s and early 1960s American Television Networks such as NBC, CBS and ABC received greater control of their schedules allowing for television producers to earn greater profits allowing them to work with companies to develop continuous repeatable prime-time programs.

Action-oriented genres such as the Western and crime series thrived within 1950s television. Initially, Western television series for adult audiences appeared in 1955 with 28 different series in the genre being aired between 1958 and 1959, accounting for about 26% of network prime-time television. The television Western lost its popularity around the 1962–63 season, and were replaced with various new styles of shows like Alfred Hitchcock Presents (1959–1965), The Twilight Zone (1959–1965) and contemporary crime television such as The Untouchables (1959–1963). Quinn Martin, who worked on The Untouchables for its first two seasons formed his own production company QM Productions. The company developed numerous similar series from the 1960s to the mid-1970s that established conventions of action television such as rugged realism and outdoor location shoots and night-time shooting, instead of just darkening footage, which was the common procedure at the time.

Action television programs emerged more distinctly in the 1960s. For decades, action was a prominent feature of crime television appearing as early as Hawaii Five-O (1968–1980) and remained a key part of the genre for decades. Tasker described the genre as becoming prominent with Starsky & Hutch (1975–1979) through regular sequences of car chases, shoot-outs, explosions, fights and scenes of urban pursuit. While previous television works such as The Streets of San Francisco (1972–1977) and The Rockford Files (1974–1980) featured narratives of police officers and car chase stunt work, Starsky & Hutch involved several iconographic action images such as cars chases, gun fights, female bodies on display and physical violence as a more constant feature of individual episodes in the series.

Action and adventure television series that Tasker described as "television staples" throughout the 1970s and 1980s included The Six Million Dollar Man, Charlie's Angels and The A-Team (1983–1987). By the 1980s, the realist style of action television has given way to a new emphasis on image and style that was ushered in partially from shifts in social, economic and politics in the United States with Osgerby, Gough-Yates and Wells writing that this was most exmpleified with Miami Vice (1984–1989) with its constant camera movements, unnatural color sachems and mood music. Both Miami Vice and Magnum P.I. (1980–1988), another action oriented crime series, would achieve success in the 1980s.

Action was less prominent as a feature of crime series through the 1990s, being replaced with shows like dramas and procedurals like Law & Order, NYPD Blue, and Homicide, which had conventions with a greater emphasis on dialogue and debate over contemporary issues related to crime and policing. Action also began to play an important element in fantasy television genres with widely watched series such as Buffy the Vampire Slayer (1997–2003). These television productions were in response to the popularity of films like Terminator 2: Judgement Day and film series like Alien featured which featured female characters such as Sarah Connor and Ellen Ripley. These series began with characters and series such as Xena in Xena: Warrior Princess (1995–2001), Buffy Summers in Buffy the Vampire Slayer and several others that would emerge in their wake such as Alias (2001–2006), La Femme Nikita (1997–2001), Dark Angel (2000–2002), and Witchblade (2001–2002).

The twenty-first century has seen action taking on a greater prominence once more in espionage and military-themed series including 24 (2001–2010, 2014) and NCIS and its even more action-oriented spin-off with NCIS: Los Angeles (2009–2023).

== Themes ==
Gender is a topic discussed regularly by scholars of action and its hybrid genres for television. Lisa Purse in her book Contemporary Action Cinema (2011) commented that the female action heroes from the late 1990s and early 2000s featured physically empowered women styled after cartoon or comic strips which made them overtly-sexualized, a trend that would continue in action films in the 2000s.

== Reception and influence ==
Tasker described action television as having a low cultural status. She said the lack of academic study of action television was due to the cultural status of shows that were important to the genre such as Starsky & Hutch or Miami Vice.

Elements of action films, such as the intensely paced editing of action films in the 1990s Hollywood productions such as those by Michael Bay, had previously been associated with a style shown in television series like Miami Vice.
