= Action comedy =

Film and TV genre

Action comedy is a hybrid genre that combines elements of action fiction with comedy. While early action films feature stuntwork and humor, academic Cynthia King wrote that the genre only came into its own as a mainstay of the American action film genre in the 1980s when actors who had backgrounds in comedy such as Eddie Murphy began taking roles in action films. The genre approaches various narratives and styles such as buddy films, superhero films, and Hong Kong action cinema featuring various actors such as Jackie Chan.

Action comedy has also been a recurring theme in television, with series such as The Dukes of Hazzard (1979–1985) and Peacemaker (2022).

== Film ==
Academic Yvonne Tasker described most post-classical Hollywood action films as "more or less hybrids." Action films are set across multiple settings and spaces with no single defining landscape and can become complicated in categorization which is sometimes acknowledged through hybridized designators such as action comedy.

=== Characteristics ===
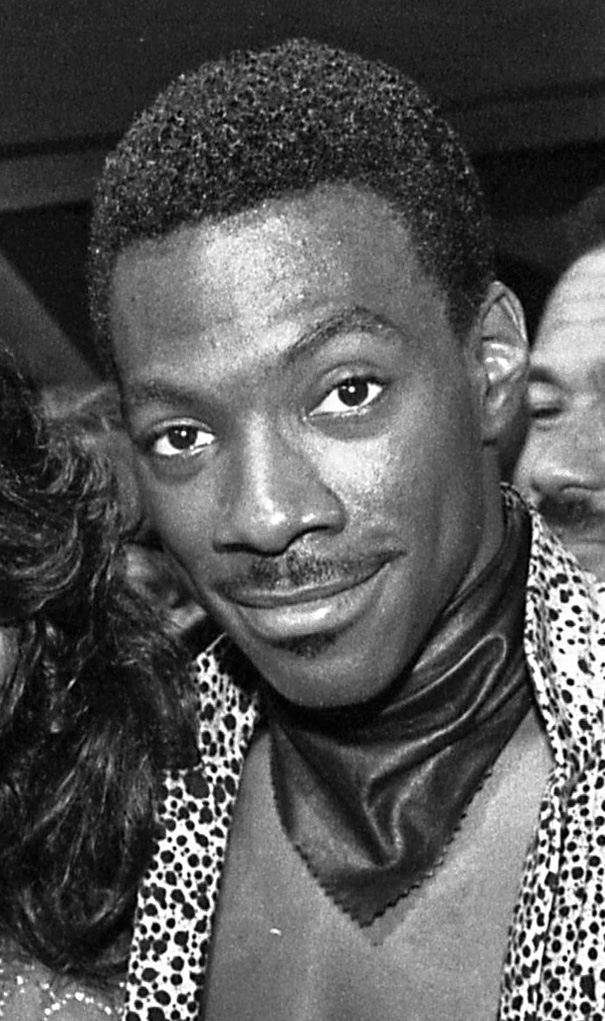
Academic Cynthia King said that the action comedy film only came into its own as a mainstay of the American action film genre in the 1980s when actors who had backgrounds in comedy such as Eddie Murphy (pictured) began taking roles in action films.

Cynthia King said that the term "action comedy" is typically reserved for action films in which humor plays a relatively central role. Such films can take on a wide variety of formats, including buddy films involving mismatched partners such as the Lethal Weapon (1987–1998) and the Rush Hour (1998–2007) film series, as well as Hong Kong action cinema films featuring actors such as Jackie Chan. King also included within the genre the more comedic superhero films such as Mystery Men (1999), Hancock (2008) and The Green Hornet (2011).

Elements of action comedy existed in early cinema, such as the chase sequences in pre-1915 films such as The Lonedale Operator (1911), which anticipate editing patterns of later action films such as Wheels on Meals (1984). Later silent film comedies such as those featuring Charlie Chaplin and Buster Keaton (e.g., Easy Street (1917) and The General (1926)) featured chases, gags and stunts that would serve as inspirations for both comedic and non-comedic action set pieces in later action films. These films include Chaplin and Keaton using physical materials on stage, either weapons or props, to emphasize, affect or respond to their bodily actions.

King wrote that despite a large cinematic history of humor and peril, the action comedy film only "came into its own" as part of American action film genre in the early 1980s, notably when actors who had backgrounds in comedy such as Eddie Murphy began taking roles in action films.

In his book, Lights, Camera, Action: Crafting an Action Script (2005), Gregory Sarno said that not all films containing conflict and humor are action comedies; Sarno considered films with action-laden subplots such as Big Momma's House (2000) and Dumb & Dumber (1994) to be closer to straight comedies because the action lacks an integral role in their narratives. King echoed this point, saying that films such as Night at the Museum (2006) or Loaded Weapon 1 (1993) are better categorized as straight comedies since most of the action is framed comically with no serious violence or peril. She also said that the occurrence of sardonic one-liners in an action film, such as "Go ahead, make my day" from Sudden Impact (1983), is insufficient to categorize such a film as an action comedy.

Mark Gallagher, in Action Figures: Men, Action Films and Contemporary Adventure Narratives (2006), stated that action comedies often feature a fish out of water theme, such as Murphy's character clashing with upper-class white communities and conventional police procedures in the Beverly Hills Cop (1984–2024) film series.

=== List of films ===
List of action comedy films
| Film | Year | Ref. |
|---|---|---|
| 21 Jump Street | 2012 | |
| 22 Jump Street | 2014 | |
| 48 Hrs. | 1982 | |
| American Made | 2017 | |
| Ant-Man | 2015 | |
| Ant-Man and the Wasp | 2018 | |
| Attack the Block | 2011 | |
| Bad Boys | 1995 | |
| Bad Boys for Life | 2020 | |
| Big Trouble in Little China | 1986 | |
| Beverly Hills Cop | 1984 | |
| Birds of Prey | 2020 | |
| Black Dynamite | 2009 | |
| The Bob's Burgers Movie | 2022 | |
| The Blues Brothers | 1980 | |
| The Cabin in the Woods | 2011 | |
| D.E.B.S. | 2004 | |
| Deadpool | 2016 | |
| Deadpool 2 | 2018 | |
| Deadpool & Wolverine | 2024 | |
| Drive-Away Dolls | 2024 | |
| Drunken Master II | 1994 | |
| Dungeons & Dragons: Honor Among Thieves | 2023 | |
| Everything Everywhere All at Once | 2022 | |
| The Fall Guy | 2024 | |
| Futurama: Bender's Big Score | 2007 | |
| Futurama: The Beast with a Billion Backs | 2008 | |
| Futurama: Bender's Game | 2008 | |
| Futurama: Into the Wild Green Yonder | 2009 | |
| Free Guy | 2021 | |
| Galaxy Quest | 1999 | |
| Game Night | 2018 | |
| Get Smart | 2008 | |
| The General | 1926 | |
| The Gentlemen | 2019 | |
| Ghostbusters | 1984 | |
| Guardians of the Galaxy | 2014 | |
| Guardians of the Galaxy Vol. 2 | 2017 | |
| The Heat | 2013 | |
| Hit Man | 2023 | |
| Hot Fuzz | 2007 | |
| If Looks Could Kill | 1991 | |
| The Interview | 2014 | |
| Johnny English | 2003 | |
| Jumanji: Welcome to the Jungle | 2017 | |
| Keanu | 2016 | |
| Kick-Ass | 2010 | |
| Kingsman: The Secret Service | 2014 | |
| Kiss Kiss Bang Bang | 2005 | |
| Kung Fu Hustle | 2004 | |
| Lethal Weapon | 1987 | |
| Lethal Weapon 2 | 1989 | |
| Lock, Stock and Two Smoking Barrels | 1998 | |
| Logan Lucky | 2007 | |
| The Man from U.N.C.L.E. | 2015 | |
| The Mask | 1994 | |
| Men in Black | 1997 | |
| Midnight Run | 1988 | |
| Miss Congeniality | 2000 | |
| Mr. & Mrs. Smith | 2005 | |
| The Nice Guys | 2016 | |
| Now You See Me 2 | 2016 | |
| The Other Guys | 2010 | |
| The Paper Tigers | 2020 | |
| Pirates of the Caribbean: The Curse of the Black Pearl | 2003 | |
| Police Story | 1985 | |
| Polite Society | 2023 | |
| The Princess Bride | 1987 | |
| Red | 2010 | |
| Ride Along | 2014 | |
| Romancing the Stone | 1984 | |
| Rumble in the Bronx | 1995 | |
| Rush Hour | 1998 | |
| Rush Hour 2 | 2001 | |
| Rush Hour 3 | 2007 | |
| Scott Pilgrim vs. the World | 2010 | |
| Shanghai Noon | 2000 | |
| Shaolin Soccer | 2001 | |
| Shaun of the Dead | 2004 | |
| Shazam! | 2019 | |
| The Simpsons Movie | 2007 | |
| Shotgun Wedding | 2022 | |
| Something Wild | 1986 | |
| Spy | 2015 | |
| Spy Kids | 2001 | |
| The Suicide Squad | 2021 | |
| Supercop | 1992 | |
| Tag | 2018 | |
| Team America: World Police | 2004 | |
| Thor: Ragnarok | 2017 | |
| Three Kings | 1999 | |
| Tropic Thunder | 2008 | |

== TV series ==
List of action comedy TV series
| TV series | Year(s) | Ref. |
|---|---|---|
| The A-Team | 1983–1987 | |
| Burn Notice | 2007–2013 | |
| Chuck | 2007–2012 | |
| Doom Patrol | 2020–2022 | |
| The Dukes of Hazzard | 1979–1985 | |
| Future Man | 2017–2020 | |
| Futurama | 1999-2003, 2007-2013, 2023-present | |
| Kidd Video | 1984–1985 | |
| Lethal Weapon | 2016–2019 | |
| Our Flag Means Death | 2022-2023 | |
| Peacemaker | 2022 | |
| Remington Steele | 1982–1987 | |
| Rush Hour | 2016 | |
| Teenage Bounty Hunters | 2020 | |

== Sources ==
- Barrowman, Kyle (2019). "Origins of the Action Film". In Kendric, James (ed.). A Companion to the Action Film. Blackwell Publishing Ltd. ISBN 978-1119100492.
- Gallagher, Mark (2006). Action Figures: Men, Action Films and Contemporary Adventure Narratives. Palgrave Macmillan. p. 163. ISBN 1403970122.
- Holmlund, Chris; Purse, Lisa; Tasker, Yvonne (2024). "Introduction: Action as Mode". In Holmlund, Chris; Purse, Lisa; Tasker, Yvonne (eds.). Action Cinema Since 2000. Bloomsbury Publishing. ISBN 9781839022784.
- King, Cynthia M. (2019). "Comedy in Action". In Kendric, James (ed.). A Companion to the Action Film. Blackwell Publishing Ltd. ISBN 978-1119100492.
- Sarno, Gregory (2005). Lights, Camera, Action: Crafting an Action Script. Littlebear Productions. ISBN 978-0595360574.
- Tasker, Yvonne, ed. (2004). Action and Adventure Cinema. Routledge. ISBN 0-203-64515-4.
