= Express Yourself (Madonna song) =

1989 single by Madonna

Single by Madonna

from the album Like a Prayer
- B-side: "The Look of Love"
- Released: May 9, 1989
- Recorded: October 3, 1988
- Studio: Johnny Yuma (Burbank, California, U.S.)
- Genre: House (single version); Dance-pop; deep funk (album version)
- Length: 4:37 (album version); 4:30 (7" Remix)
- Label: Sire; Warner Bros.
- Songwriters: Madonna; Stephen Bray
- Producers: Madonna; Stephen Bray

Madonna singles chronology
"Like a Prayer" (1989)	"Express Yourself" (1989)	"Cherish" (1989)

Music video
- "Express Yourself" on YouTube

"Express Yourself" is a song by American singer-songwriter Madonna from her fourth studio album, Like a Prayer (1989). It was released as the second single from the album on May 9, 1989, by Sire Records. The song was included on the greatest hits compilation albums The Immaculate Collection (1990), Celebration (2009) and Finally Enough Love: 50 Number Ones (2022). "Express Yourself" was the first song that Madonna and co-producer Stephen Bray collaborated on for Like a Prayer. Written and produced by them, the song was a tribute to American funk and soul band Sly and the Family Stone. The main inspiration behind the song is female empowerment, urging women never to go for second-best and to urge their partners to express their inner feelings.

"Express Yourself" was remixed into an upbeat house song by Shep Pettibone. This version features instrumentation from percussion, handclaps and drum beats, while the chorus is backed by the sound of a horn section. The lyrics talk about rejecting material pleasures and only accepting the best for oneself; subtexts are employed throughout the song. "Express Yourself" received positive reviews from critics, who applauded the gender equality message of the song and complimented the song for being a hymn to freedom and encouragement to women and all oppressed minorities. Commercially, the song peaked at number two on the Billboard Hot 100 and became Madonna's eighth number-one hit on the Eurochart Hot 100 Singles chart. It also reached the top of the singles charts in Canada and Switzerland, and the top five elsewhere.

The accompanying music video, directed by David Fincher, was inspired by the Fritz Lang classic film Metropolis (1927). It had a total budget of $5 million ($12.99 million in 2025 dollars), which made it the most expensive music video made up to then, and currently the third most expensive of all time. The video portrayed a city full of tall skyscrapers and railway lines on a dark, stormy night. Madonna played the part of a glamorous lady and chained masochist, with muscular men acting as her workers. In the end, she picks one of them—played by model Cameron Alborzian—as her date. Critics noted the video's depiction of female sexuality and that Madonna's masculine image in the video was gender-bending.

"Express Yourself" has been performed on four of Madonna's world tours, and has been covered by the female leads of the Fox TV show Glee, who performed the song in the episode titled "The Power of Madonna". The song and the video are noted for their freedom expression and feminist aspects, and its postmodern nature entranced academics, by resisting definition. It has also left its mark on the work of subsequent pop acts, including the Spice Girls, Britney Spears, Christina Aguilera and Lady Gaga.

== Background ==
"The message of the song is that people should always say what it is they want. The reason relationships don't work is because they are afraid. That's been my problem in all my relationships. I'm sure people see me as an outspoken person, and for the most part, if I want something I ask for it. But sometimes you feel that if you ask for too much or ask for the wrong thing from someone you care about that that person won't like you. And so you censor yourself. I've been guilty of that in every meaningful relationship I've ever had. The time I learn how not to edit myself will be the time I consider myself a complete adult."

— Madonna talking to Stephen Holden of The New York Times.

"Express Yourself" was released as the second single from her fourth studio album, Like a Prayer, on May 9, 1989, with "The Look of Love", from the 1987 film soundtrack Who's That Girl, on its B-side. When Madonna started work on Like a Prayer, she considered many options, and thought about the musical direction for it. She had certain matters on her mind, including her troubled relationship with her husband Sean Penn, her family, her lost mother and even her belief in God. Madonna thought about lyrical ideas for the songs on topics that, until then, were personal meditation, never to be shared with her public so openly and pointedly. She came to the realization that as she and her fans were growing up, and it was time for her to move away from the teen appeal to wider audiences, and en-cash on the longevity of the album market. Madonna wanted her new sound to be calculative and indicative of what was fashionable, and ride the changing trend of music.

As Madonna considered her alternatives, producers Patrick Leonard and Stephen Bray had individually begun to tinker with various instrumental tracks and musical ideas to present to her for consideration. "Express Yourself" was the first song that Madonna and Bray collaborated on for Like a Prayer, co-written and co-produced as a tribute to American funk and soul band Sly and the Family Stone. The main inspiration behind the song is female empowerment, urging women never to "go for second-best" and to put their love "to the test". Author Mick St. Michael quoted Madonna saying:

"The ultimate thing behind the song is that if you don't express yourself, if you don't say what you want, then you're not going to get it. And in effect you are chained down by your inability to say what you feel or go after what you want."

== Composition ==
'Express Yourself'
A 28 second sample of the song, where Madonna sings the first verse, accompanied by a male voice repeating the last line. The chorus follows, backed by handclaps and drum beats and instrumentation from a saxophone and percussion.

"Express Yourself" begins with the sound of percussion instruments, as Madonna entreats the listener: "Come on girls, do you believe in love? 'Cause I got something to say about it, And it goes something like this." Handclaps and drum beats start as Madonna moves into the chorus of the song, with a thick vocal texture and high-pitched background singing. The chorus is aided by instrumentation from a saxophone and percussion. Madonna then sings the first verse of the song, as a violin sound is added after she finishes the bridge, "Make you feel like a queen on the throne, make you love it till you never come down", a male voice repeating the last line. A synthesizer is played after the second verse as Madonna continues chanting the words "Express yourself" with background vocals singing "Hey, hey, hey, hey" alongside her.

After a small saxophone interlude, a break-down comes with Madonna singing in a fuller voice, as horns and percussion beats continue. Madonna changes the lyrics at the end to "express himself", and after another repetition of the bridge and the intermediate verse, the chorus comes where she changes the lyrics back to the original title. The song ends with the words "respect yourself" fading out. Set within a simple song structure, "Express Yourself" plays with ambiguity through a subtle control of harmony and the avoidance of diatonic closure. The song appears to be in the key of G major but its actual composition seems to be written in the key of C major. But the first note of the melody, "don't" in B♭ major, implies the G Dorian mode. This is also evident in Madonna's vocal nuance on the words "express yourself", which initially centers on G, before moving down a semitone to E minor, the raised 6th in G Dorian. Per the sheet music published by Alfred Publishing Co. Inc., "Express Yourself" is set in time signature of common time, with a tempo of 120 beats per minute. Madonna's voice range spans from G_{3} to C_{5} with a chord progression of G–F/G–C–G.

According to Rikky Rooksby, author of The Complete Guide to the Music of Madonna, the lyrics of "Express Yourself" make it a simple love song, with Madonna exhorting the women in her audience not to go for second-best, to express their feelings and get their men to express theirs. Lucy O'Brien, author of Madonna: Like an Icon, described them as a "feminist call-to-arms", with Madonna dismissing the satin sheets and gold baubles of material pleasures. According to Douglas Kellner, the phrase "a big strong hand, to lift you to your higher ground" is implied as one's own hand, and not the typical male helping hand. Santiago Fouz-Hernández believed that the lyrics created identification with the gay community, with the line "Come on girls, do you believe in love?" also addressing gay males.

== Critical reception ==
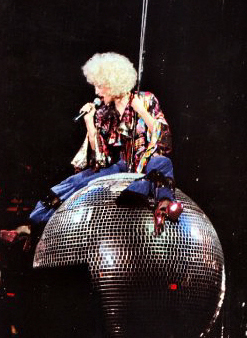
Madonna beginning the performance of "Express Yourself" on 1993's The Girlie Show World Tour, sitting on top of a disco ball.

"Express Yourself" received mainly positive reviews from critics. J. Randy Taraborrelli, author of Madonna: An Intimate Biography called the song a "funky dance anthem" and reacted positively to its message of a "female call-to-arms in communication and self-respect." Stephen Holden of The New York Times observed that Madonna repudiated the philosophy of her previous single "Material Girl" (1985) in "Express Yourself", which he described as "a 30-year-old's view of life unshadowed by rebellion and lingering lapsed Catholic pain." In another article from the same newspaper, Carn James declared it as one of her most exuberant songs. Santiago Fouz-Hernández and Freya Jarman-Ivens, authors of Madonna's Drowned Worlds, complimented the lyrics of the song, and added that it apparently espouses "gender fluidity as a road to gender equality." In his book Madonna As Postmodern Myth, journalist Georges Claude Guilbert described "Express Yourself" as a hymn to freedom, "an encouragement for all women and all oppressed minorities to resist, to express their ideas and their strength faced with tyranny."

Biographer Mary Cross noted in her book Madonna: A Biography, how the song paved the way for its music video and became a testament to freedom. Authors Allen Metz and Carol Benson noted in their essays on Madonna, how she decimated "patriarchal, racist and capitalist constructions", by the way she pronounced the word "self" in "Express Yourself". They added that the opening line "Don't go for second best, baby" transformed the song into a postmodernist anthem. Scholar Sheila Whiteley noted in her book Women and Popular Music: Sexuality, Identity, and Subjectivity, that Madonna's acknowledgment of the pastiche and of being capable of imitating musical style was interesting to her, but given Madonna's ability to manipulate image, the musical exuberance of "Express Yourself" did not appear surprising. Mark Bego, author of Madonna: Blond Ambition declared that "the song that most reflected the Madonna everyone had come to know and be shocked by was 'Express Yourself'." O'Brien was impressed with the song, and gave a detailed review:

"Express Yourself" is a feminist call to arms, complete with muscular brass-playing and soulful voice. Here Madonna is the anti-materialism girl, exhorting her audience to respect themselves. That means having a man who loves your head and your heart. If he doesn't treat you right (and here's the revolutionary rhetoric) you're better off on your own. Like a female preacher, Madonna emphasizes each word of the chorus, invoking God and the power of orgasm. In parts Cosmo-woman, girl-talk, and swinging dance track, it presages the deliciously declarative stance of "Vogue" and shows Madonna moving from introspective to survivalist mode.

Professor Maury Dean wrote in his book Rock 'n' Roll Gold Rush: A Singles Un-Cyclopedia, that the main appeal of "Express Yourself" lay in its teen appeal, although he understood that at its core, it was addressing a very important issue of female liberation. Kevin Phinney from Austin American-Statesman commented that with "Express Yourself", Madonna struck out her "Material Girl" persona, there by demonstrating once more that no image of hers is concrete. Based on the lyrics of the song, Ken Blakely of Philadelphia Daily News declared the song as a rare example of good taste and good advice from Like a Prayer. Andy Goldberg from The Jerusalem Post was impressed with Madonna's vocals on the song, complimenting the soul influences. Rolling Stone's J. D. Considine called "Express Yourself" an unabashed groove tune and felt that it seemed "smart and sassy, right down to Madonna's soul-style testimony on the intro: 'Come on, girls, do you believe in love?" Don McCleese from Chicago Sun-Times declared the song as one of the highlights of the album, feeling that it would become anthemic. Sal Cinquemani from Slant Magazine while reviewing Like a Prayer, announced "Express Yourself" as the "most soulful performance" of Madonna's career. He added that the song "turned Madonna's 'Material Girl' image on its head, denouncing material things for a little r-e-s-p-e-c-t." Tom Doyle from Smash Hits named it Single of the Fortnight and "by far the most gutsy and brash record she's made" since "Papa Don't Preach". He concluded, "With its loud, parping horns and bouncy dancebeat, this is the sort of record that reminds you just how brilliant pop music can sometimes be." Stephen Thomas Erlewine from AllMusic wrote that the song consisted of "deep funk" music.

== Chart performance ==
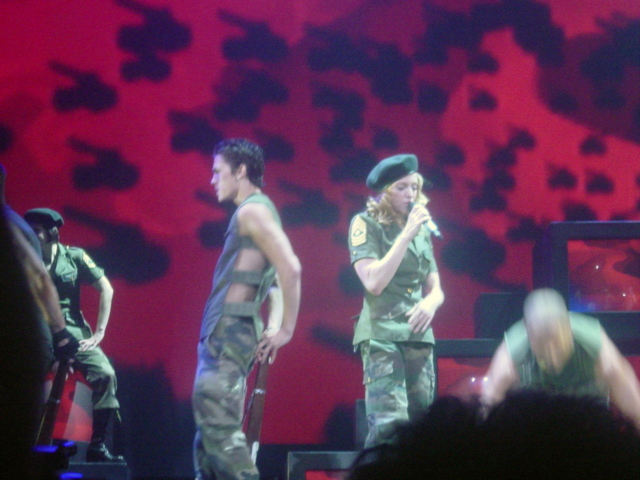
Madonna and her dancers performing a military themed version of "Express Yourself" during the Re-Invention World Tour (2004)

In the United States, "Express Yourself" was the highest debuting single at number 41 on the Billboard Hot 100, for the issue dated June 3, 1989, and after four weeks reached the top ten of the chart, at number six. It eventually peaked at number two for two weeks. "Express Yourself" was present for a total of 16 weeks on the Hot 100 and placed at number 55 on the year-end chart. The song reached the top of the Dance Club Play chart of Billboard, while on the Hot Adult Contemporary chart, it peaked outside the top-ten, at number 12. "Express Yourself" was certified gold by the Recording Industry Association of America (RIAA) in August 1989, for shipment of 500,000 copies of the single across United States.

In Canada, "Express Yourself" debuted at number 82 on the RPM 100 Singles chart and reached the top in its ninth week, earning Madonna her ninth number-one single in the country. The track stayed at number-one for two consecutive weeks, was present on the chart for 17 weeks total, and finished as the eighth-best-selling Canadian single of 1989.

In Australia, "Express Yourself" debuted on the ARIA Singles Chart at number 36 on June 4, 1989. After five weeks, the song reached a peak of number five on the chart, staying there for one week, before descending the chart. It was present for a total of 19 weeks on the chart, and was certified Gold by the Australian Recording Industry Association (ARIA) for shipment of 35,000 copies of the single. At the year-end charts of ARIA, "Express Yourself" was the 28th best-selling Australian single of 1989. In New Zealand, the song debuted at number five on the RIANZ Singles Chart, and reaching a peak of number two after three weeks. It was present for a total of 12 weeks on the chart.

"Express Yourself" was released in the United Kingdom on June 3, 1989, and entered the UK Singles Chart at number ten, moving to its peak of number five the next week. "Express Yourself" was the 85th best-selling song of 1989 in the UK, with the British Phonographic Industry (BPI) certifying it silver, for shipment of 200,000 copies of the single. "Express Yourself" was Madonna's eighth number one single on the Eurochart Hot 100 Singles chart, reaching the top on July 1, 1989, and staying at number one for three weeks. In Belgium, "Express Yourself" debuted at number 16 on the Ultratop chart on June 10, 1989, and reached a peak of number three. In the Netherlands, "Express Yourself" debuted at number 27 on the Dutch Top 40, and reached a peak of five on July 1, 1989. The song reached a peak of number three in Germany, where it remained for two weeks, before spending a total of 18 weeks on the chart. On the Swiss Singles Chart, "Express Yourself" was one of the highest debuting song on the issued dated June 11, 1989. After seven weeks, the song reached the top of the chart for one week, becoming Madonna's third number-one single there.

== Music video ==
=== Development and release ===
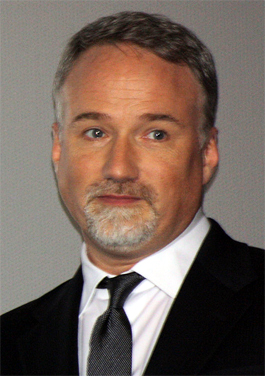
The music video for "Express Yourself" was directed by David Fincher.

The music video for "Express Yourself" was directed by David Fincher and filmed in April 1989, at Culver Studios in Culver City, California. It was produced by Gregg Fienberg, under Propaganda Films, with editing by Scott Chestnut, principal photography by Mark Plummer, and Vance Lorenzini as the production designer. It had a total budget of $5 million ($12.99 million in 2025 dollars), which made it the most expensive music video in history at the time it was made, and currently the third most expensive of all time. The video was inspired by the Fritz Lang classic film Metropolis (1927), and featured an epigraph at the end of the video from the film: "Without the Heart, there can be no understanding between the hand and the mind".

The concept of the video was to portray Madonna as a glamorous lady and chained masochist, with muscular men acting as her workers. In the end, she picks one of them—played by model Cameron Alborzian—as her date. When Fincher explained this concept to Madonna, she was intrigued and decided to portray a masculine persona. She was dating actor Warren Beatty at that time, and asked him to play the part of a slave working at a factory; Beatty politely refused, saying later that "Madonna wanted the video as a show case of her sexual prowess, I never wanted to be a part of it." She then thought about Metropolis and of its scenes displaying factory workers and a city with tall skyscrapers. Fincher liked the concept and it became the main backdrop for the video. In Madonna 'Talking': Madonna in Her Own Words, she commented about the development of the video.

This one I had the most input. I oversaw everything—the building of the sets, everyone's costumes, I had meetings with make-up and hair and the cinematographer, everybody. Casting, finding the right cat—just every aspect. Kind of like making a little movie. We basically sat down and just threw out all every idea we could possibly conceive of and of all the things we wanted. All the imagery we wanted—and I had a few set ideas, for instance the cat and the idea of Metropolis. I definitely wanted to have that influence, that look on all the men—the workers, diligently, methodically working away.

Madonna mentioned jokingly in a 1990 BBC Television interview on the program Omnibus, that the main theme of the video and the cat metaphor represented that "Pussy rules the world". She added that the idea of the cat licking the milk and then pour it over, was the director's. "It's great but believe me I fought him on that. I didn't want to do it. I thought it's just so over the top and silly and kind of cliched, an art student or a film student's kind of trick. I'm glad that I gave in to him." The music video had its world-premiere on May 17, 1989, on MTV and was an MTV exclusive for three weeks, being aired every hour on the music channel. It was later included on Madonna's video compilations The Immaculate Collection (1990) and Celebration: The Video Collection (2009), and on the iTunes Store deluxe edition of greatest hits album Celebration, which featured 30 of her music videos.

=== Synopsis ===
Madonna portraying a masculine persona in the music video for "Express Yourself"

The video opens with the view of a city populated with skyscrapers, railway lines and aero-crafts. Steam blows out of the funnels of a factory as big machines are shown. Madonna appears on the back of a statue, shouting: "Come on girls, do you believe in love?" Inside the factory, workers slave at the machines, as rain pours incessantly on them, and later perform choreographed dance routine, while in her penthouse Madonna is shown in a light-green gown, stroking a black cat. As the cat escapes, Madonna's singing reaches the factory through a series of speakers. Both the factory owner and one of the workers look up towards the source of the voice.

In the second verse, Madonna, wearing lingerie, dances in a suggestive manner behind different white screens, while the worker lies on a steel bed and thinks of the voice. Madonna dances atop a long flight of stairs inside the factory, wearing a pinstripe suit and monocle. She grabs her crotch and briefly tears open her jacket to expose her bra. In the meantime, the factory owner listens to live musicians in his room, with a remote control, as Madonna is shown lying naked on her bed, with one end of a heavy chain attached to her neck, the other end going long down into the factory. As the owner leers at the musicians in the room, the worker is shown caressing Madonna's cat, while looking up expectantly towards her room.

As the final verse begins, a soaked Madonna is shown crawling on the floor, like a cat, towards a bowl of milk, licks it like a cat and pours it over her shoulder. These scenes are interspersed with Madonna sitting on a sofa and smoking. The worker gets up from his steel bed and, carrying Madonna's cat, and travels up in an elevator, while the other workers engage in boxing. The worker reaches the penthouse, where a naked and seemingly vulnerable Madonna is sitting on her bed. He returns the cat, takes her into his arm, and makes love to her as the door closes behind them. The owner of the factory using the same monocle glass sees the empty position where the worker was and looks up towards the penthouse. The video ends with a last shot of the city-line, with Madonna's eyes above the sky, and the quote, "Without the heart, there can be no understanding between the hand and the mind", adapted from the film Metropolis.

=== Reception and analysis ===
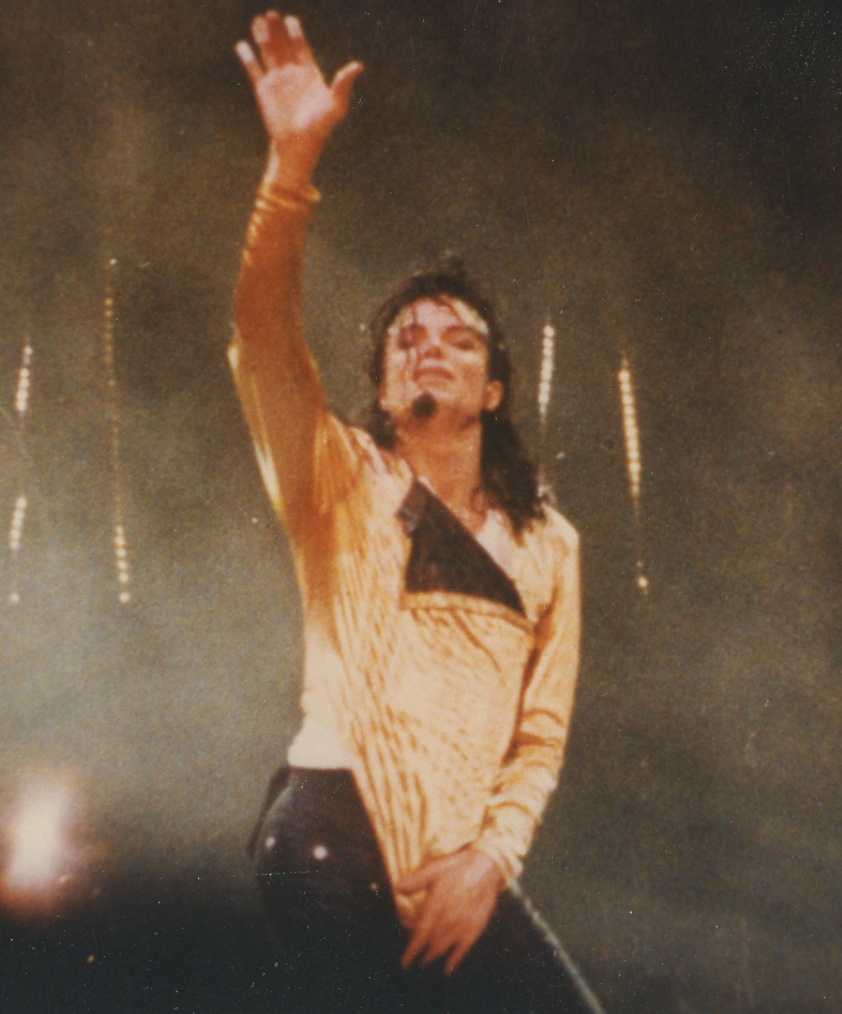
Madonna's crotch-grabbing in the music video was compared to that of Michael Jackson.

Authors Santiago Fouz-Hernández and Freya Jarman-Ivens commented that "the video portrayed the deconstructive gender-bending approach associated with free play and self-reflexivity of images in postmodernism." They had initially thought the video as a feminist approach to sexuality, leading them to say that "the video might also relate to several core political questions raised by feminism." However, they deduced that the scenes showing Madonna in a seductive manner and chained to her bed do not portray women in an empowering position, but emphasizes the fact that women can be in control because of their sexual prowess. Jarman-Ivens added that the epigraph establishes the status-quo, with a clear distinction of the body (workers, hand, labors) and the mind (elite, intellect capital). Unlike Metropolis, where the line denoted the binary oppositions of the labor class against the elitist, in the video Madonna did not distinguish between the two. Jarman-Ivens noted that the video portrayed both men and women being looked at, actively or passively. The body and the hand are not separate there, instead the heart, hand and head are portrayed as a balance in everybody, male or female. Scholar Theodore Gracyk also noted of the initial portrayal of female sexuality in the video, in his book, I Wanna Be Me: Rock Music and the Politics of Identity, and criticized the video for its portrayal of male domination. However, on close inspection, Gracyk came to the conclusion that "Express Yourself" was a smart move for Madonna, as it actually portrayed women in a much stronger position. Author John Evan Seery wrote in his book Political Theory for Mortals, that "Madonna with her 'Express Yourself' video splicing together images of machines with images of sex,... represents the ultimate cyborg of late twentieth-century America." Allen Metz felt that the scenes of Madonna grabbing her crotch and dancing were reminiscent of "Michael Jackson's androgynous imitation of phallic masculinity." He went on to compliment the video for its gender-bending depiction.

Michelle Gibson and Deborah Townsend Meem, authors of Femme/Butch, commended the video for showing a shift in power between the sexes, declaring that "Madonna assertively claimed all possible gender space like Marlene Dietrich." Professor Carol Vernallis noted in her book, Experiencing Music Video that the diffused light around Madonna in the video was adopted to mimic the diffusion of sound and make the borders around Madonna appear soft, and her body spread outwards. In the book The 1980s, authors Bob Batchelor and Scott Stoddart called "Express Yourself" as one of Madonna's most challenging videos. They noted the video for its "exploitation" of the male body and sexualizing them as an object of desire. The authors also added that the video "was a colorful homage to the term gaze, but Madonna is the bearer of it—not men." Batchelor explained that the scenes of Madonna performing alone in her room and atop the stairs suggested that she was the object of the gaze, however it seemed to them that she was mocking the movement of the men below. "She controls the mind of the men below, with a form of siren's song of female empowerment, signalling that the men do move in unison to her song", Stoddart concluded. Elizabeth Edwards, one of the authors of Visual Sense: A Cultural Reader, explained that the shot of Madonna crawling on the floor, while another image of hers watches from a nearby sofa, illustrated the mutation that Madonna's image was undergoing. According to her, Madonna was acting out self-consciousness by "watching herself". She concluded by saying, "'Express Yourself' gives its viewers a whole new series of image references to traditional American gendered and sexual icons—male and female—and a whole new level of irony." Shari Benstock and Suzanne Ferriss, authors of On Fashion, deconstructed the video for its display of the artificiality of images of gender. Sal Cinquemani from Slant Magazine reviewed the video in 2003, and commented that the video "is the embodiment of 'queer chic', a bombastic masterpiece that heralds Madonna's uncanny ability to use her consumer-driven image to code her feminist politics."

The music video is inspired by Metropolis's images of skyscrapers, chimneys, and industrial labor.

In her book Culture and Power, María José Coperiás Aguilar pointed out the video for its chaotic texture through the rapid editing of the multiple shots that constituted it. The sudden and continuous changes of camera angles, scenes and the distance and mood seemed to produce an "apparently incoherent combination of images that offered no stable anchor to provide the whole with a definitive interpretation", she added. Since chaos has traditionally been associated with the female ontogenetic principle as opposed to male principle of order, the video in turn came to be associated with duality between order/chaos, male/female, good/evil, light/dark etc. Aguilar also drew parallel between Metropolis and the music video. Madonna borrowed different phallic symbolism from the film, including the smoke-billowing chimneys, the tall skyscrapers and the oppressive environment of industrial work. However, unlike Metropolis which portrayed repression of a rebellious proletariat, the chaotic nature of "Express Yourself" video showed freedom instead. Caryn James from The New York Times added that "asked about the video, [Madonna] made a distinction that any honest feminist would respect, however politically incorrect it may seem. 'I have chained myself', she said. 'There wasn't a man that put that chain on me.' You don't have to buy Madonna's next loopy bit of symbolism—'I was chained to my desires'—to believe the feminist subtext she finds in the video. 'I do everything by my own volition. I'm in charge, O.K.' Madonna in chains, though, is far removed from those unfortunate women who don't know that they have options." Madonna also complained about the feminist criticisms of her "crotch-grabbing", saying that "if male singers like Michael Jackson can get away with it, why can't women?"

Theorist Douglas Kellner further asserted that the video was a feminist critique of male fighting and brutality, with images of the male workers engaged in a boxing match at the end. According to him, Madonna deliberately appropriated traditional feminine images in the beginning of the video, but contrasted them with her "crotch-hugging" male poses near the end, and discordant images of women assuming the male position. As feminist author Susan Bordo pointed out, "it is the postmodern nature of the video that has most entranced academic critics, and its various ways of constituting identities that refuse stability, that remain fluid, that resist definition." At the 1989 MTV Video Music Awards, "Express Yourself" was nominated in the categories of Best Female Video, Best Editing, Best Cinematography, Best Direction and Best Art Direction, winning the last three categories. Billboard also honored the video as the Best Music Video of the year, at their Music Video Awards for 1989. The music video of "Express Yourself" is ranked at number one on Slant Magazine's "100 Greatest Music Videos". It is also placed at number ten on both Rolling Stone's "The 100 Top Music Videos" and MTV's "100 Greatest Videos Ever Made", as well as number three on MuchMusic's list of "Top 100 Videos of The Century". David Dale from The Sydney Morning Herald listed it as one of the Most Influential Videos of All Time, at number 18. In 2011, Time magazine named it one of the 30 All-Time Best Music Videos.

== Live performances ==
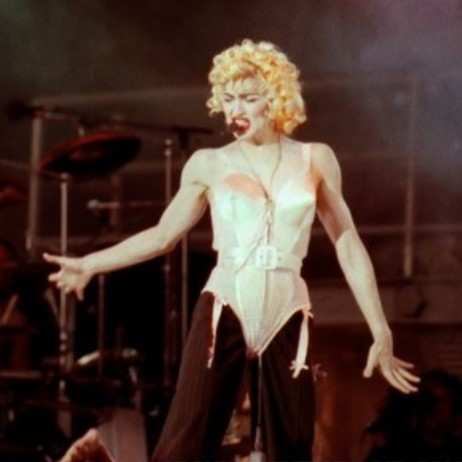
Madonna opening the Blond Ambition World Tour with a performance of "Express Yourself"

Madonna's first live performance of "Express Yourself" was at the 1989 MTV Video Music Awards. She started the performance by descending from a flight of stairs, wearing a pin-striped suit and a monocle. Later she removed the coat to reveal her bustier, and together with her backup singers Niki Haris and Donna De Lory, performed a dance routine called voguing. Ian Inglis, author of Performance and Popular Music: History, Place and Time noted that the historical importance of Madonna's performance at the Video Music Awards was due to the televisual venue. Inglis explained that since Madonna's performance was striking primarily as a high-energy, provocatively choreographed, dance production number, it went on to highlight the 'TV' part of MTV, and in a way heralded her and the network as a cultural arbiter.

Madonna included the song in the set list of her Blond Ambition World Tour in 1990, which featured a version based on the Non-Stop Express remix of the song and included lyrics from "Everybody" during the introduction. The set was inspired by Metropolis and the themes were taken from the factory seen in the music video. It included a number of funnels billowing smoke, steel piping, cables hanging above and a flight of stairs in the middle. As the show started, the set was hurled onstage and Madonna's male dancers, with bare torso, appeared behind the steel structures. They did a choreographed routine on the stage, and towards the end Madonna appeared atop the flight of stairs. She was dressed in a pin-striped suit with holes cut in it, so that her brassiere pocked out of them. Underneath she wore a peach colored corset with a pointed conical bra, designed by Jean Paul Gaultier. She also held a monocle in her hand. Accompanied by her two female dancers dressed in a similar attire, Madonna did a straightforward vocal rendition of the track, and an elaborate choreography, which included voguing, humping, simulated masturbation and momentary storage of the performers' microphone inside their bras. At one point Madonna opened the suit, to reveal the corset with the bra, and tassels hanging from its sides. Two different performances were taped and released on video, the Blond Ambition – Japan Tour 90, taped in Yokohama, Japan, on April 27, 1990, and the Live! – Blond Ambition World Tour 90, taped in Nice, France, on August 5, 1990. It was also one of the performances included in the documentary, Madonna: Truth or Dare (1990).

She also performed a disco-styled version of the song during The Girlie Show World Tour in 1993. The stage was decked in Mylar curtains and glittering disco balls. The performance began with a distorted voice claiming "I'm gonna take you to a place you've never been before". Afterwards, Madonna descended from the ceiling on a giant disco ball, wearing a blond afro wig, 1970's style halters and royal blue bell-bottom pants. Then her two back-up dancers appeared on the stage and the three women started singing the song together. The end of the performance was connected to the next song, "Deeper and Deeper". According to Guilbert, Madonna was inspired by actress Marlene Dietrich in the 1932 film Blonde Venus for the performance. It was included on The Girlie Show: Live Down Under home video release, recorded on November 19, 1993, at Sydney, Australia. "Express Yourself" was included in the military segment of the Re-Invention World Tour in 2004, with the opening line altered to "Come on boys!". She and her dancers were dressed in military gear and performed a rifle choreography, with Madonna acting as a sergeant. As Drew Sterwald from News Press noted, the song in its military version was talking about both personal love, as well as patriotic love. Jon Pareles of The New York Times commented that the song was contravened as cynical, when Madonna sang the line, "What you need is a big, strong hand/To lift you to your higher ground", and raised a rifle above her head. Author Dirk Timmerman pointed out that "in the context of the show, with [war-induced] performances like 'American Life' and 'Imagine', it added to the anti-war message of the tour." In 2008, during the Sticky & Sweet Tour, she performed "Express Yourself" as the request song in some of her shows, including the show at Madison Square Garden in New York.

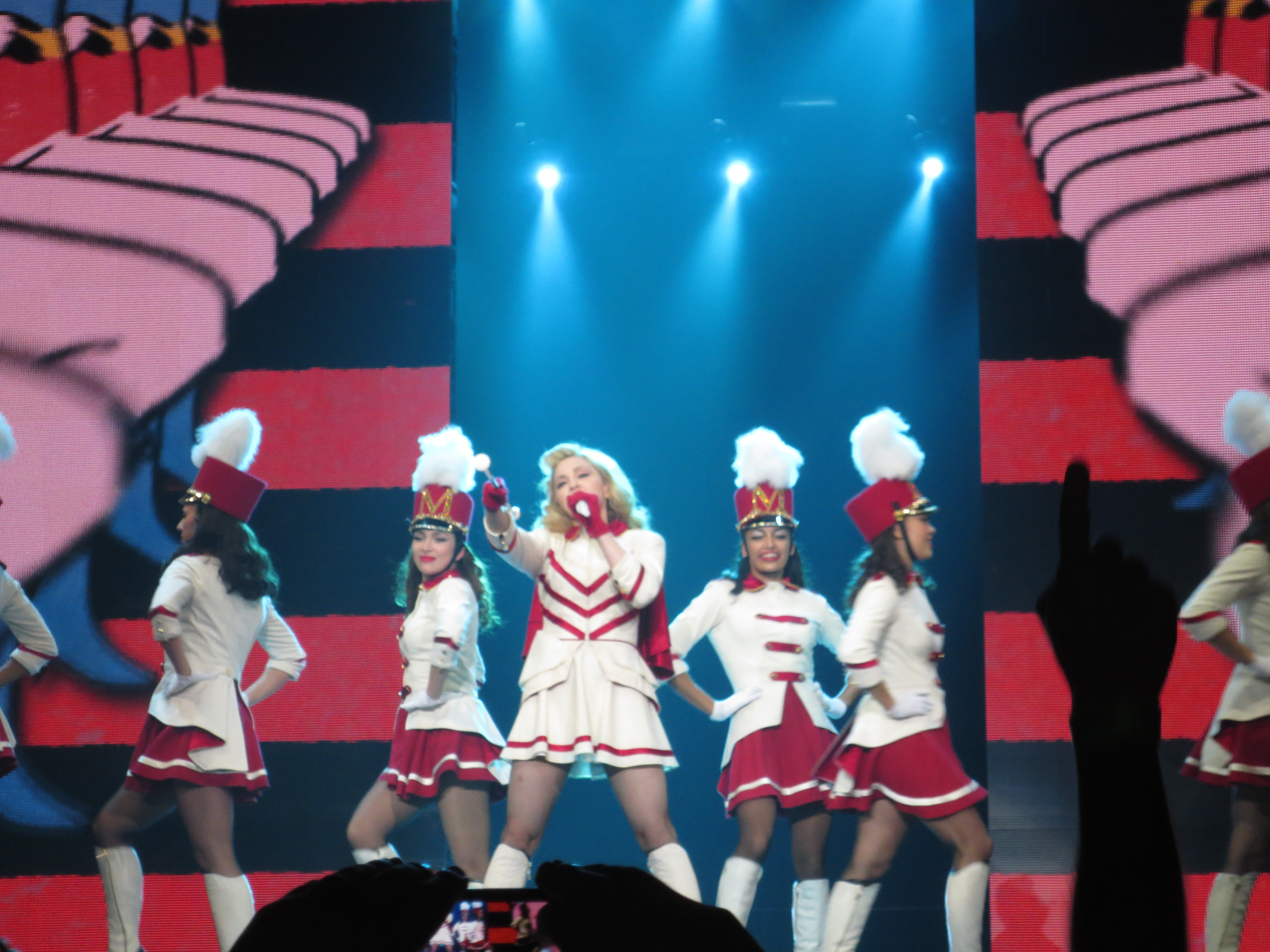
Madonna performing a mashup of "Express Yourself" and Lady Gaga's "Born This Way" on The MDNA Tour. Upon release, "Born This Way" was compared by some critics to "Express Yourself".

In 2012, she performed an excerpt of the song at the Super Bowl XLVI Halftime Show with Cee Lo Green and a large marching band. That same year, "Express Yourself" was included on The MDNA Tour where it was given a majorette theme and was the opening song of the show's second segment titled Prophecy, where a mix of joyful songs that "bring people together" were performed. Madonna appeared onstage and sang the song dressed in a white majorette uniform with ruby-red stripes and knee-high white boots designed by Miu Miu and twirled a baton; her female back-up dancers wore similar costumes in red . Halfway through the song, Madonna sang the chorus of Lady Gaga's "Born This Way", as the chord progression and melody of "Born This Way" was heavily compared to that of "Express Yourself" upon its release, many speculated that Madonna was "dissing" Gaga and the song. Towards the end of the performance Madonna also sang the chorus of her own song "She's Not Me" from her eleventh studio album Hard Candy (2008). Critics were positive towards the performance, Melissa Ruggieri from Access Atlanta felt that by singing the chorus of Lady Gaga's "Born This Way" while performing "Express Yourself", Madonna was "proving how it swipes the same melody line, then twisted the knife in that perfectly Madonna way by adding the chorus of her own 'She's Not Me'". The performance was included in the live album MDNA World Tour released on September 6, 2013 but the "Born This Way" sample was not credited in the album's liner notes.

Four years later, Madonna sang "Express Yourself" on her Madonna: Tears of a Clown show at a benefit gala on December 2, 2016, at Miami Beach's Faena Forum. The concert was held along with an accompanying art auction and dinner, to benefit Madonna's Raising Malawi foundation to support their projects like the Mercy James Pediatric Surgery Hospital in Malawi, as well as art and education initiatives for impoverished children in the country. On November 7, 2016, Madonna performed the song as part of an impromptu acoustic concert at Washington Square Park in support of Hillary Clinton's presidential campaign. During the 2019–20 Madame X Tour, Madonna sang portions of the song a capella along with three of her children, Stella, Estere and Mercy James. It was also sung during the 2023-2024 Celebration Tour on some dates, played acapella.

== Cover versions and usage in media ==
Kelly Clarkson performed "Express Yourself" on her first audition for the first season of singing television series American Idol. She went on to win the competition and built a successful music career. The 1999 compilation album, Virgin Voices: A Tribute To Madonna, Vol. 1, features a cover version by Information Society. In 2010, the female leads of the Fox TV show Glee performed the song in the episode titled "The Power of Madonna". When the fictional character Will Schuester observes a cheer leading group in the episode performing a routine with stilts to Madonna's "Ray of Light", he is inspired to set a Madonna-themed assignment for the members of the fictional Glee club, New Directions. To this, the female members of the club perform "Express Yourself", much to the uneasiness of the male members. This version was released on the soundtrack album Glee: The Music, The Power of Madonna, and reached number 132 on the UK Singles Chart. Nearly 30 years after the "Like a Prayer" controversy, "Express Yourself" was featured in a Pepsi commercial for Super Bowl 50. Chad Stubbs, the VP marketing of Pepsi, explained the song choice, "It was within that album and era that we had worked with Madonna before." The song was performed by the cast of the romantic comedy Isn't It Romantic (2019) as the closing number for the film. In 2021, Miley Cyrus covered the song for her Peacock television special Miley Cyrus Presents Stand by You.

== Legacy ==
"Express Yourself" is noted both for its song and its accompanying music video, both of which are considered feminist odes to freedom. María José Coperiás Aguilar opined that the release of the song was in context of the anti-feminist or the "backlash" ideology dominant in the U.S., since the rise of the "New Right" in the 1980s and the government of Ronald Reagan and George H. W. Bush. Aguilar went on to explain that the 1980s and the 1990s were characterized by a conservative reaction against the "excesses" of the 1960s and 70s. This reaction was channeled mainly by the media's strong attacks against feminism, generally describing activists as "tortured people with hairy legs", "radical, bitter, man-hating, separatist and lesbian", accompanied by messages advocating a feminization of women that turned them into beautiful ornamental objects, and tended to increase the cultural differences between the sexes. "Express Yourself" appeared as a refutation of some of these reactionary premises. The title, Aguilar noted, seemed to raise the question of the urgency of a feminine voice to develop and emerge—a concern that recalled the tradition of French feminists like Hélène Cixous and Luce Irigaray.

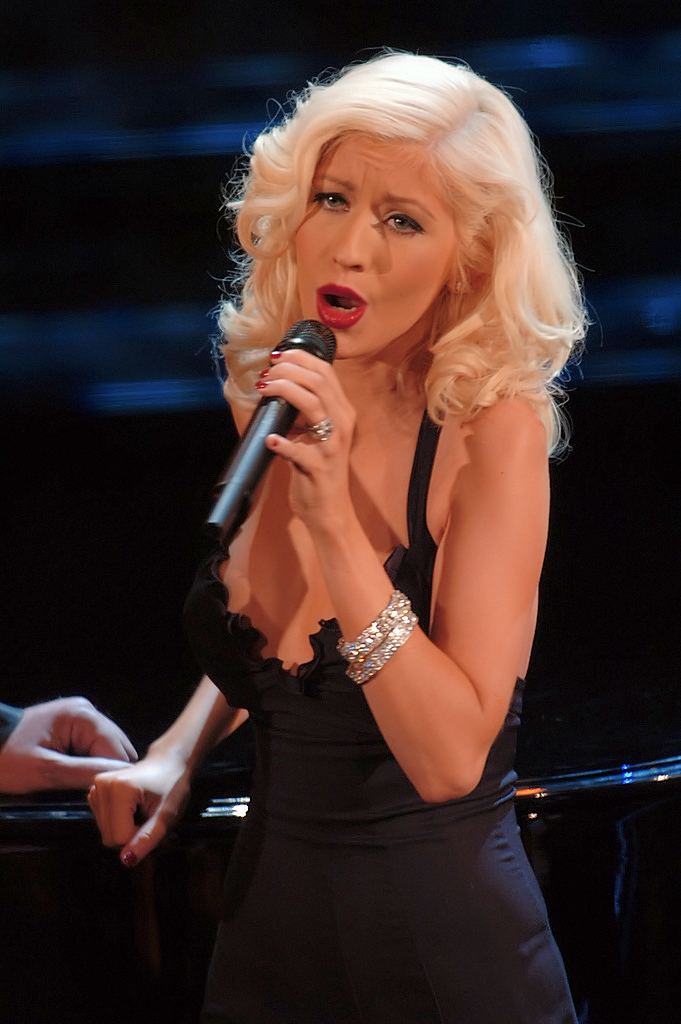
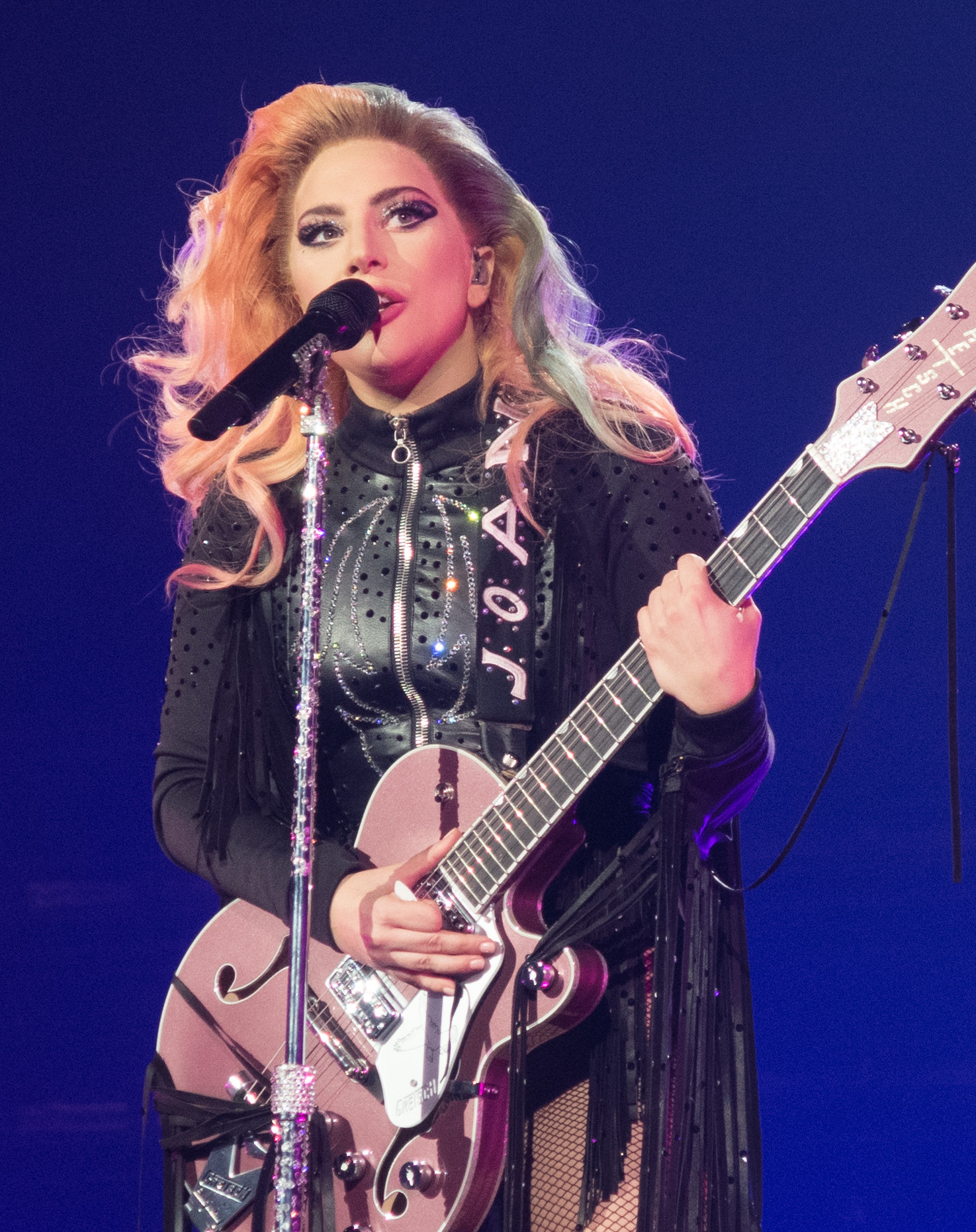
"Express Yourself" has impacted the work of later musical artists, including that of Christina Aguilera (left) and Lady Gaga (right).

"Express Yourself" has also influenced numerous music artists. Spice Girls member Melanie C said "Madonna was doing the girl power thing a long time before the Spice Girls... 'Express Yourself' is one of the routines that I know and I used to really like doing that one because it is where she shows her bra and holds her crotch." In 2010, singer Christina Aguilera paid tribute to "Express Yourself" with the music video of her single, "Not Myself Tonight". She commented "One of my favorite videos ever is 'Express Yourself' by Madonna which came across as really strong and empowering which I always try to incorporate through my expression of sexuality... I love the direct reference I made to Madonna with the eye glass moment and the smoke and stairs. I was paying tribute to a very strong woman who has paved the way before." James Montgomery from MTV deemed "Express Yourself" as the primary influence of Aguilera's video with scenes like Aguilera displaying a monocle, standing atop a flight of stairs and crawling across the floor while pouring a black liquid over herself.

Similarities were also noted between "Express Yourself" and singer Lady Gaga's 2011 single "Born This Way" both in subject matter and composition. "I certainly think [Gaga] references me a lot in her work," Madonna said in the ABC interview. "And sometimes I think it's amusing and flattering and well-done. When I heard ['Born This Way'] on the radio ... I said, 'that sounds very familiar." Gaga herself addressed the comparisons on The Tonight Show with Jay Leno, explaining that she had received an e-mail from Madonna's representatives, who had mentioned their support for "Born This Way". CNN later reported that Madonna's representatives denied sending any approval. AllMusic also note a "striking similarity" between "Express Yourself" and Kylie Minogue's 1991 single "What Do I Have to Do", writing that "Kylie Minogue has always displayed a strong Madonna influence—something she's readily admitted to in interviews."

== Track listing and formats ==
- US and Canada 7" single
1. "Express Yourself" (7" Remix) – 4:30
2. "The Look of Love" (Album Version) – 4:03
- US 12" single
1. "Express Yourself" (Non-Stop Express Mix) – 7:57
2. "Express Yourself" (Stop & Go Dubs) – 10:49
3. "Express Yourself" (Local Mix) – 6:26
4. "The Look of Love" (Album Version) – 4:00
- UK 3" CD single
1. "Express Yourself" (Non-Stop Express Mix) – 7:57
2. "Express Yourself" (Stop & Go Dubs) – 10:49
- German 12" Maxi-Single
1. "Express Yourself" (Non-Stop Express Mix) – 7:57
2. "Express Yourself" (Stop & Go Dubs) – 10:49
- Japanese 3" CD Single
1. "Express Yourself" (Album Version) – 4:37
2. "The Look of Love" (Album Version) – 4:00
- Japanese CD Mini-Album
1. "Like a Prayer" (12" Dance Mix) – 7:50
2. "Like a Prayer" (12" Extended Mix) – 7:21
3. "Like a Prayer" (Churchapella) – 6:05
4. "Like a Prayer" (12" Club Version) – 6:35
5. "Like a Prayer" (7" Remix Edit) – 5:41
6. "Express Yourself" (Non-Stop Express Mix) – 7:57
7. "Express Yourself" (Stop & Go Dubs) – 10:49
8. "Express Yourself" (Local Mix) – 6:26
- Digital single (2021)
1. "Express Yourself" (7" Remix) – 4:30
2. "Express Yourself" (Remix / Edit) – 5:04
3. "Express Yourself" (Non-Stop Express Mix) – 7:57
4. "Express Yourself" (Stop & Go Dubs) – 10:49
5. "Express Yourself" (Local Mix) – 6:26

== Credits and personnel ==
- Madonna – songwriter, producer, vocals
- Niki Haris – background vocals
- Stephen Bray – songwriter, producer, arranger
- Bob Rosa – engineering
- Fred McFarlane – programming
- Bob Ludwig – mastering
- Bill Bottrell – mixing
- Shep Pettibone – arranger, remixer
- Herb Ritts – cover art, photographer
- Kama Logan – typography
- Jeri Heiden – cover art designer

Credits and personnel adapted from Like a Prayer album liner notes.

== Charts ==
=== Weekly charts ===
Weekly chart performance for "Express Yourself"
Chart (1989)	Peak position
Australia (ARIA)	5
Austria (Ö3 Austria Top 40)	5
Belgium (Ultratop 50 Flanders)	3
Canada Top Singles (RPM)	1
Canada Retail Singles (The Record)	4
Canada Dance/Urban (RPM)	1
Denmark (IFPI)	15
Ecuador	7
Europe (Eurochart Hot 100)	1
Finland (Suomen virallinen lista)	2
France (SNEP)	7
Ireland (IRMA)	3
Italy (Musica e dischi)	1
Italy Airplay (Music & Media)	1
Netherlands (Dutch Top 40)	5
Netherlands (Single Top 100)	5
New Zealand (Recorded Music NZ)	2
Norway (VG-lista)	4
Spain (AFYVE)	3
Sweden (Sverigetopplistan)	3
Switzerland (Schweizer Hitparade)	1
UK Singles (Official Charts)	5
US Billboard Hot 100	2
US Adult Contemporary (Billboard)	12
US Dance Club Songs (Billboard)	1
US Dance Singles Sales (Billboard)	1
US Cash Box Top 100	1
US CHR & Pop (Radio & Records)	3
Venezuela (UPI)	6
West Germany (GfK)	3

=== Year-end charts ===
Year-end chart performance for "Express Yourself"
Chart (1989)	Position
Australia (ARIA)	28
Belgium (Ultratop 50 Flanders)	43
Canada Top Singles (RPM)	8
Canada Dance/Urban (RPM)	22
Europe (Eurochart Hot 100 Singles)	21
Netherlands (Dutch Top 40)	63
Netherlands (Single Top 100)	51
New Zealand (RIANZ)	33
Norway Spring Period (VG-lista)	13
Spain (AFYVE)	16
Switzerland (Schweizer Hitparade)	12
UK Singles (OCC)	85
US Billboard Hot 100	55
US 12-inch Singles Sales (Billboard)	14
US Dance Club Play (Billboard)	12
US Cash Box Top 100	16
West Germany (Media Control)	32

== Certifications ==
Certifications and sales for "Express Yourself"
Region	Certification	Certified units/sales
Australia (ARIA)	Gold	35,000^{^}
Brazil (Pro-Música Brasil)	Gold	30,000^{*}
United Kingdom (BPI)	Silver	200,000^{^}
United States (RIAA)	Gold	500,000^{^}
^{*} Sales figures based on certification alone.^{^} Shipments figures based on certification alone.

== See also ==
- List of number-one singles of 1989 (Canada)
- List of RPM number-one dance singles of 1989 (Canada)
- List of European number-one hits of 1989
- List of most expensive music videos
- List of number-one singles of the 1980s (Switzerland)
- List of Billboard number-one dance singles of 1989 (US)
- List of Cash Box Top 100 number-one singles of 1989

== Bibliography ==
- Aguilar, María José Coperiás (2000), Culture and Power: Challenging Discourses, Universitat de València, ISBN 978-84-370-4429-3
- Batchelor, Bob; Stoddart, Scott (2007), The 1980s, Greenwood Publishing Group, ISBN 978-0-313-33000-1
- Bego, Mark (2000), Madonna: Blonde Ambition, Cooper Square Press, ISBN 0-8154-1051-4
- Benstock, Shari; Ferriss, Suzanne (2004), On Fashion, Rutgers University Press, ISBN 978-0-8135-2033-9
- Bordo, Susan R.; Heywood, Leslie (2004), Unbearable Weight: Feminism, Western Culture, and the Body, University of California Press, ISBN 0-520-24054-5
- Clerk, Carol (2002), Madonnastyle, Omnibus Press, ISBN 0-7119-8874-9
- Cross, Mary (2007), Madonna: A Biography, Greenwood Publishing Group, ISBN 978-0-313-33811-3
- Dean, Maury (2003), Rock 'n' Roll Gold Rush: A Singles Un-Cyclopedia, Algora Publishing, ISBN 0-87586-207-1
- Edwards, Elizabeth; Bhaumik, Kaushik (2009), Visual Sense: A Cultural Reader, Berg Publishers, ISBN 978-1-84520-740-3
- Fouz-Hernández, Santiago; Jarman-Ivens, Freya (2004), Madonna's Drowned Worlds, Ashgate Publishing, Ltd., ISBN 0-7546-3372-1
- Gibson, Michelle; Meem, Deborah Townsend (2002), Femme/Butch: New Considerations of the Way We Want to Go, Psychology Press, ISBN 978-1-56023-301-5
- Gracyk, Theodore (2001), I Wanna Be Me: Rock Music and the Politics of Identity, Temple University Press, ISBN 978-1-56639-903-6
- Guilbert, Georges-Claude (2002), Madonna As Postmodern Myth, McFarland, ISBN 0-7864-1408-1
- Inglis, Ian (2006), Performance and Popular Music: History, Place and Time, Ashgate Publishing, Ltd., ISBN 978-0-7546-4057-8
- Kellner, Douglas (1995), Media Culture: Cultural Studies, Identity, and Politics Between the Modern and the Postmodern, Routledge, ISBN 0-415-10570-6
- Metz, Allen; Benson, Carol (1999), The Madonna Companion: Two Decades of Commentary, Music Sales Group, ISBN 0-8256-7194-9
- Michael, Mick St. (2004), Madonna 'Talking': Madonna in Her Own Words, Omnibus Press, ISBN 978-0-7119-7734-1
- O'Brien, Lucy (2007), Madonna: Like an Icon, Bantam Press, ISBN 978-0-593-05547-2
- Rooksby, Rikky (2004), The Complete Guide to the Music of Madonna, Omnibus Press, ISBN 0-7119-9883-3
- Seery, John Evan (1996), Political theory for mortals: shades of justice, images of death, Cornell University Press, ISBN 978-0-8014-8376-9
- Taraborrelli, Randy J. (2002), Madonna: An Intimate Biography, Simon & Schuster, ISBN 978-1-4165-8346-2
- Tasker, Yvonne (1998), Working Girls: Gender and Sexuality in Popular Cinema, Psychology Press, ISBN 978-0-415-14005-8
- Timmerman, Dirk (2007), Madonna Live! Secret Re-inventions and Confessions on Tour, Maklu Publications Inc, ISBN 978-90-8595-002-8
- Vernallis, Carol (2004), Experiencing Music Video: Aesthetics and Cultural Context, Columbia University Press, ISBN 978-0-231-11799-9
- Whiteley, Sheila (2000), Women and popular music: sexuality, identity, and subjectivity, Routledge, ISBN 0-415-21190-5
