= List of action film directors =

Action film directors guide the filming and creative elements in action movies, a film genre where action sequences, such as fights, shootouts, stunts, car chases or explosions either take precedence, or, in finer examples of the genre, are used as a form of exposition and character development. Action movie directors may also blend other genres into their films such as romance, science fiction, fantasy, comedy, drama, horror, etc... This genre is closely linked with those of thriller and adventure films.

== Notable directors ==
Director	Action films	Ref.
J. J. Abrams	Mission Impossible III (2006), Star Trek (2009), Super 8 (2011), Star Trek Into Darkness (2013), Star Wars: The Force Awakens (2015), Star Wars: The Rise of Skywalker (2019)	
Adil & Bilall	Black (2015), and Gangsta (2018), Bad Boys for Life (2020) and Bad Boys: Ride or Die (2024)	
Jon Amiel	Entrapment (1999), The Core (2003)	
Siddharth Anand	Bang Bang! (2014), War (2019), Pathaan (2023), Fighter (2024)	
Paul W. S. Anderson	Shopping (1994), Mortal Kombat (1995), Soldier (1998), Resident Evil (2002), Alien vs. Predator (2004), Resident Evil: Extinction (2007), Death Race (2008), Resident Evil: Afterlife (2010), The Three Musketeers (2011), Resident Evil: Retribution (2012), Pompeii (2014), Resident Evil: The Final Chapter (2016), Monster Hunter (2020)	
Michael Apted	The Squeeze (1977), Extreme Measures (1996), The World Is Not Enough (1999), Enigma (2001 film), The Chronicles of Narnia: The Voyage of the Dawn Treader (2010), Unlocked (2017)	
Newt Arnold	Bloodsport (1988)	
David Ayer	Harsh Times (2005), Street Kings (2008), End of Watch (2012), Sabotage (2014), Fury (2014), Suicide Squad (2016), Bright (2017), The Tax Collector (2020),The Beekeeper (2024)	
John Badham	Blue Thunder (1983), Stakeout (1987), Bird on a Wire (1990), The Hard Way (1991), Point of No Return (1993), Another Stakeout (1993), Drop Zone (1994), Nick of Time (1995)	
Jose Balagtas	Magdaleno Orbos: Sa Kuko ng Mga Lawin (1992)	
Andrzej Bartkowiak	Romeo Must Die (2000), Exit Wounds (2001), Cradle 2 the Grave (2003), Doom (2005), Street Fighter: The Legend of Chun-Li (2009), Maximum Impact (2017), Dead Reckoning (2020)	
Craig R. Baxley	Action Jackson (1988), I Come in Peace (1990), Stone Cold (1991)	
Michael Bay	Bad Boys (1995), Armageddon (1998), Pearl Harbor (2001), Bad Boys II (2003), The Island (2005), Transformers (2007), Transformers: Revenge of the Fallen (2009), Transformers: Dark of the Moon (2011), Pain & Gain (2013), Transformers: Age of Extinction (2014), 13 Hours: The Secret Soldiers of Benghazi (2016), Transformers: The Last Knight (2017), 6 Underground (2019), Ambulance (2022)	
Peter Berg	The Rundown (2003), The Kingdom (2007), Hancock (2008), The Losers (2010), Battleship (2012), Lone Survivor (2013), Deepwater Horizon (2016), Patriots Day (2016), Mile 22 (2018), Spenser Confidential (2020)	
Luc Besson	La Femme Nikita (1990), Léon: The Professional (1994), The Fifth Element (1997), The Messenger: The Story of Joan of Arc (1999), The Extraordinary Adventures of Adèle Blanc-Sec (2010), The Family (2013), Lucy (2014), Valerian and the City of a Thousand Planets (2017), Anna (2019), Dogman (2023)	
Kathryn Bigelow	The Loveless (1981), Near Dark (1987), Blue Steel (1990), Point Break (1991), Strange Days (1995), K-19: The Widowmaker (2002),The Hurt Locker (2008), Zero Dark Thirty (2012)	
Neill Blomkamp	District 9 (2009), Elysium (2013), Chappie (2015)	
Bong Joon-ho	Memories of Murder (2003), The Host (2006), Snowpiercer (2013), Okja (2017)	
Marco Brambilla	Demolition Man (1993)	
Tim Burton	Batman (1989), Batman Returns (1992), Planet of the Apes (2001)	
James Cameron	The Terminator (1984), Aliens (1986), Terminator 2: Judgment Day (1991), True Lies (1994), Avatar franchise (2009)	
Martin Campbell	No Escape (1994), GoldenEye (1995), The Mask of Zorro (1998), Vertical Limit (2000), The Legend of Zorro (2005), Casino Royale (2006), Edge of Darkness (2010), Green Lantern (2011), The Foreigner (2017), The Protégé (2021), Memory (2022), Dirty Angels (2024), Cleaner (2025)	
Joe Carnahan	Blood, Guts, Bullets and Octane (1998), Narc (2002), Smokin' Aces (2006), The A-Team (2010), The Grey (2011), Stretch (2014), Boss Level (2020), Copshop (2021)	
John Carpenter	Assault on Precinct 13 (1976), Escape From New York (1981), Big Trouble in Little China (1986), They Live (1988)	
D. J. Caruso	Disturbia (2007), Eagle Eye (2008), I Am Number Four (2011), XXX: Return of Xander Cage (2017)	
Steve Carver	The Arena (1974), Big Bad Mama (1974), Capone (1975), Drum (1976), An Eye for an Eye (1981), Lone Wolf McQuade (1983), Bulletproof (1988), River of Death (1989)	
Enzo G. Castellari	Any Gun Can Play (1967), One Dollar Too Many (1968), Johnny Hamlet (1968), Eagles Over London (1969), Street Law (1974), Keoma (1976), The Big Racket (1976), The Heroin Busters (1977), The Inglorious Bastards (1977), Day of the Cobra (1980), The New Barbarians (1983), Escape from the Bronx (1983), Tuareg – The Desert Warrior (1984)	
Michael Caton-Jones	Memphis Belle (1990), Rob Roy (1995), The Jackal (1997) City by the Sea (2002)	
Benny Chan	A Moment of Romance (1990) Big Bullet (1996), Who Am I? (1998), Gen-X Cops (1999), New Police Story (2004), Divergence (2005), Rob-B-Hood (2006), Invisible Target (2007), Connected (2008), Shaolin (2011), The White Storm (2013), Call of Heroes (2016), Raging Fire (2021)	
Gordon Chan	Fist Of Legend (1994), Beast Cops (1998), God of War (2017)	
Chang Cheh	One-Armed Swordsman (1967), Golden Swallow (1968), The Boxer From Shantung (1972), The Blood Brothers (1973), Five Venoms (1978), Five Element Ninjas (1982)	
Ching Siu-tung	Duel to the Death (1982), A Chinese Ghost Story (1987), The Swordsman films (1990–93)	
Stephen Chow	From Beijing with Love (1994), The God of Cookery (1996), King of Comedy (1999), Shaolin Soccer (2001), Kung Fu Hustle (2004)	
Robert Clouse	Enter the Dragon (1973), Black Belt Jones (1974), Gymkata (1985), China O'Brien (1990), China O'Brien II (1990)	
Rob Cohen	Dragonheart (1996), Daylight (1996), The Fast and the Furious (2001), XXX (2002),Stealth (2005), The Hurricane Heist (2018)	
Jaume Collet-Sera	Unknown (2011), Non-Stop (2014), Run All Night (2015), The Commuter (2018), Black Adam (2022), Carry-On (2024)	
Sergio Corbucci	Grand Canyon Massacre (1964), Minnesota Clay (1964), Django (1966), Navajo Joe (1966), The Hellbenders (1967), The Great Silence (1968), The Mercenary (1968), The Specialists (1969)	
George Pan Cosmatos	Rambo: First Blood Part II (1985), Cobra (1986), Leviathan (1989), Tombstone (1993)	
Andrew Davis	Code of Silence (1985), The Package (1989), Under Siege (1992), The Fugitive (1993), Chain Reaction (1996) Collateral Damage (2002)	
Jan de Bont	Speed (1994), Twister (1996), Speed 2: Cruise Control (1997), Lara Croft: Tomb Raider – The Cradle of Life (2003)	
Brian De Palma	Scarface (1983), The Untouchables (1987), Casualties of War (1989), Mission: Impossible (1996)	
Guillermo del Toro	Blade II (2002), Hellboy (2004), Hellboy II: The Golden Army (2008) Pacific Rim (2013)	
Jonathan Demme	Caged Heat (1974), Married To The Mob (1988), The Manchurian Candidate (2004)	
Ernest Dickerson	Surviving the Game (1994), Bulletproof (1996)	
Mark DiSalle	Kickboxer (1989), The Perfect Weapon (1991)	
H. Tjut Djalil	Mystics in Bali (1981), Lady Terminator (1989)	
Roger Donaldson	Sleeping Dogs (1977), The Getaway (1994), Species (1995), The Bank Job (2008)	
Richard Donner	Superman (1978), Lethal Weapon films (1987–98), Maverick (1994), Conspiracy Theory (1997), 16 Blocks (2006)	
Christian Duguay	Screamers (1995), The Assignment (1997), The Art of War (2000)	
Breck Eisner	Sahara (2005), The Last Witch Hunter (2015)	
Roland Emmerich	Universal Soldier (1992), Stargate (1994), Independence Day (1996), Godzilla (1998), The Patriot (2000), The Day After Tomorrow (2004), 10,000 BC (2008), 2012 (2009), White House Down (2013), Independence Day: Resurgence (2016), Midway (2019), Moonfall (2022)	
Jonathan Eusebio	Love Hurts (2025)	
Gareth Evans	Merantau (2009), The Raid (2011), The Raid 2 (2014)	
Jon Favreau	Made (2001), Zathura: A Space Adventure (2005), Iron Man films (2008–13), Cowboys & Aliens (2011)	
David Fincher	Alien 3 (1992), Se7en (1995), Fight Club (1999), Panic Room (2002), The Killer (2023)	
Sam Firstenberg	Revenge of the Ninja (1983), Ninja III: The Domination (1984), American Ninja (1985), Avenging Force (1986), American Ninja 2: The Confrontation (1987), Riverbend (1989), Delta Force 3: The Killing Game (1991), Cyborg Cop (1993), Blood Warriors (1993), Cyborg Cop II (1994)	
Isaac Florentine	Desert Kickboxer (1992), Savate (1995), High Voltage (1997), Bridge of Dragons (1999), Cold Harvest (1999), Special Forces (2003), Undisputed II: Last Man Standing (2006), The Shepherd: Border Patrol (2008), Ninja (2009), Undisputed III: Redemption (2010), Ninja: Shadow of a Tear (2014), Close Range (2015), Acts of Vengeance (2017), Seized (2020), Hounds of War (2024)	
John Flynn	The Outfit (1973), Rolling Thunder (1977), Defiance (1980), Best Seller (1987), Lock Up (1989), Out for Justice (1991), Protection (2001)	
John Ford	The Informer (1935), Stagecoach (1939), Fort Apache (1948), 3 Godfathers (1948), Wagon Master (1950), The Sun Shines Bright (1953), Mister Roberts (1955)	
John Frankenheimer	The Train (1964), The Iceman Cometh (1973), French Connection II (1975), Black Sunday (1977), Ronin (1998), Reindeer Games (2000)	
William Friedkin	The French Connection (1971), Sorcerer (1977), To Live and Die in L.A. (1985), Killer Joe (2011)	
Kinji Fukasaku	Wolves, Pigs and Men (1964), Battles Without Honor and Humanity films (1973–74), Violent Panic: The Big Crash (1976), Battle Royale (2000)	
Cary Joji Fukunaga	No Time to Die (2021)	
Stephen Fung	Enter the Phoenix (2004), House of Fury (2005),Tai Chi 0 (2012), Tai Chi Hero (2012), The Adventurers (2017)	
Antoine Fuqua	The Replacement Killers (1998), Bait (2000), Training Day (2001), Tears of the Sun (2003), King Arthur (2004),Shooter (2007), Brooklyn's Finest (2009), The Equalizer films (2014–23), Olympus Has Fallen (2013), The Magnificent Seven (2016), Infinite (2021), Emancipation (2022)	
Christophe Gans	Crying Freeman (1995), Brotherhood of the Wolf (2001)	
Lewis Gilbert	Sink the Bismarck! (1960), You Only Live Twice (1967), The Spy Who Loved Me (1977), Moonraker (1979)	
John Glen	For Your Eyes Only (1981), Octopussy (1983), A View to a Kill (1985), The Living Daylights (1987), Licence to Kill (1989), Aces: Iron Eagle III (1992)	
James Glickenhaus	The Exterminator (1980), The Soldier (1982), The Protector (1985), Shakedown (1988), McBain (1991), Slaughter of the Innocents (1993)	
Menahem Golan	Operation Thunderbolt (1977), Enter the Ninja (1981), The Delta Force (1986)	
Allan A. Goldstein	Death Wish V: The Face of Death (1994)	
David S. Goyer	Blade: Trinity	
F. Gary Gray	Set It Off (1996),The Italian Job (2003), Law Abiding Citizen (2009), The Fate of the Furious (2016), Lift (2024)	
Paul Greengrass	The Bourne Supremacy (2004), The Bourne Ultimatum (2007), Green Zone (2010), Jason Bourne (2016)	
Guy Hamilton	The Colditz Story (1955), The Best of Enemies (1961), Goldfinger (1964), Funeral in Berlin (1966), Battle of Britain (1969), Diamonds Are Forever (1971), Live and Let Die (1973), The Man with the Golden Gun (1974), Force 10 from Navarone (1978), Remo Williams: The Adventure Begins (1985)	
Renny Harlin	The Adventures Of Ford Fairlane (1990), Die Hard 2 (1990), Cliffhanger (1993), Cutthroat Island (1995), The Long Kiss Goodnight (1996), Deep Blue Sea (1999), The Legend of Hercules (2016), Skiptrace (2016), Legend of the Ancient Sword (2018), The Bricklayer (2023)	
Jonathan Hensleigh	The Punisher (2004), Kill The Irishman (2011), The Ice Road (2021)	
Anthony Hickox	Full Eclipse (1993), Submerged (2005)	
Walter Hill	The Warriors (1979), The Long Riders (1980), Southern Comfort (1981), 48 Hrs. (1982), Streets of Fire (1984), Red Heat (1988), Another 48 Hrs. (1990), Last Man Standing (1996) Bullet to the Head (2012), The Assignment (2016), Dead for a Dollar (2022)	
Stephen Hopkins	Predator 2 (1990), Judgment Night (1993), Blown Away (1994), The Ghost and the Darkness (1996), Lost in Space (1998)	
King Hu	Come Drink with Me (1966), Dragon Inn (1967), A Touch of Zen (1971), Raining in the Mountain (1979)	
Patrick Hughes	Red Hill (2010), The Expendables 3 (2014), The Hitman's Bodyguard (2017), Hitman's Wife's Bodyguard (2021), The Man from Toronto (2022)	
Peter R. Hunt	On Her Majesty's Secret Service (1969)	
Brian G. Hutton	Where Eagles Dare (1968), Kelly's Heroes (1970)	
John Hyams	Universal Soldier: Regeneration (2009), Universal Soldier: Day of Reckoning (2012), Dragon Eyes (2012)	
Peter Hyams	Outland (1981), Running Scared (1986), The Presidio (1988), Narrow Margin (1990), Timecop (1994), Sudden Death (1995), The Musketeer (2001), Beyond a Reasonable Doubt (2009), Enemies Closer (2013)	
John Irvin	Dogs of War (1980), Raw Deal (1986), Hamburger Hill (1987)	
Peter Jackson	Lord of the Rings trilogy (2001–2003), Hobbit trilogy (2012–2014)	
Patty Jenkins	Wonder Woman (2017), Wonder Woman 1984 (2020)	
Hugh Johnson	Chill Factor (1999)	
Joe Johnston	Jurassic Park III (2001)	
Irvin Kershner	Stakeout on Dope Street (1958), The Empire Strikes Back (1980), Never Say Never Again (1983)	
Kim Jee-woon	A Bittersweet Life (2005), The Good, the Bad, the Weird (2008), I Saw the Devil (2010), The Last Stand (2013), The Age of Shadows (2016), Illang: The Wolf Brigade(2018)	
Andrei Konchalovsky	Runaway Train (1985), Tango & Cash (1989), House of Fools (2002)	
Ted Kotcheff	First Blood (1982), Uncommon Valor (1983)	
Jan Kounen	Dobermann (1997)	
Akira Kurosawa	Seven Samurai (1954), Throne of Blood (1957),The Hidden Fortress (1958),Yojimbo (1961), Sanjuro (1962), Ran (1985)	
Robert Kurtzman	The Demolitionist (1995), Deadly Impact (2010)	

- Ringo Lam
- Jess Lapid, Jr.
- Lito Lapid
- Andrew Lau
- Lau Kar-leung
- Mimi Leder
- Ang Lee
- Daniel Lee
- Danny Lee
- David Leitch
- Sergio Leone
- Mark L. Lester
- Richard Lester
- Louis Leterrier
- Sheldon Lettich
- Jonathan Liebesman
- Doug Liman
- Justin Lin
- Dwight H. Little
- Wei Lo
- William Lustig
- Jennifer Lynch
- Peter MacDonald
- Alan Mak
- Bruce Malmuth
- Michael Mann
- James Mangold
- Antonio Margheriti
- Baldo Marro
- Nico Mastorakis
- Bruno Mattei
- Olivier Megaton
- Sam Mendes
- McG
- Andrew V. McLaglen
- John McTiernan
- Christopher McQuarrie
- Takashi Miike
- Willie Milan
- John Milius
- George Miller
- Steve Miner
- Cesar Montano
- John Moore
- Pierre Morel
- Russell Mulcahy
- Geoff Murphy
- Chris Nahon
- Hal Needham
- Neveldine/Taylor
- Ilya Naishuller
- Linh Nga
- Christopher Nolan
- Aaron Norris
- Keishi Ōtomo
- Sonny Parsons
- Sam Peckinpah
- Wolfgang Petersen
- Prachya Pinkaew
- Fernando Poe Jr.
- Ted Post
- Gina Prince-Bythewood
- Alex Proyas
- Albert Pyun
- Sam Raimi
- Brett Ratner
- Spiro Razatoz
- Matt Reeves
- Nicolas Winding Refn
- Kevin Reynolds
- Ronnie Ricketts
- Guy Ritchie
- Panna Rittikrai
- Eddie Rodriguez
- Robert Rodriguez
- Philip J. Roth
- Chuck Russell
- Russo brothers
- Mikael Salomon
- Cirio H. Santiago
- Barbet Schroeder
- Ridley Scott
- Tony Scott
- Dominic Sena
- Jack Sholder
- Don Siegel
- Bryan Singer
- John Singleton
- Brian Trenchard-Smith
- Zack Snyder
- Stephen Sommers
- Steven Spielberg
- Roger Spottiswoode
- Chad Stahelski
- John Stockwell
- Oliver Stone
- John Sturges
- Lee Tamahori
- Billy Tang
- Quentin Tarantino
- J. Lee Thompson
- Johnnie To
- Stanley Tong
- Hark Tsui
- Josh Trank
- Pete Travis
- Colin Trevorrow
- Dante Varona
- Matthew Vaughn
- Gore Verbinski
- Paul Verhoeven
- Roi Vinzon
- The Wachowskis
- James Wan
- Jon Watts
- Marc Webb
- Peter Weir
- Simon West
- Joss Whedon
- Kurt Wimmer
- Michael Winner
- Tommy Wirkola
- Len Wiseman
- Kirk Wong
- John Woo
- Peter Yates
- Sang-ho Yeon
- Wilson Yip
- Terence Young
- Ronny Yu
- Corey Yuen
- Woo-ping Yuen
- Yimou Zhang
- Joseph Zito
- Edward Zwick

== Action stars who have directed their own action movies ==
- Jackie Chan = The Fearless Hyena (1979), The Young Master (1980), Dragon Lord (1982), Project A (1983), Police Story (1985), Armour of God (1986), Project A Part II (1987), Police Story 2 (1988), Miracles (1989), Armour of God II: Operation Condor (1991), etc...
- Clint Eastwood = High Plains Drifter (1973), The Eiger Sanction (1975), The Outlaw Josey Wales (1976), The Gauntlet (1977), Firefox (1982), Sudden Impact (1983), Pale Rider (1985), The Rookie (1990)
- Mel Gibson = Braveheart (1995)
- Sammo Hung = Enter the Fat Dragon (1978), Knockabout (1979), Encounters of the Spooky Kind (1980), The Prodigal Son (1981), Wheels on Meals (1984), Millionaire's Express (1986), Eastern Condors (1987), Dragons Forever (1988), Pedicab Driver (1989), etc...
- Lau Kar-leung = The 36th Chamber of Shaolin, Dirty Ho, Drunken Master II
- Bruce Lee = Way of the Dragon (1972)
- Jet Li = Born to Defence (1986)
- Dolph Lundgren = The Defender (2004), The Mechanik (2005), Missionary Man (2007), Diamond Dogs (2007), Command Performance (2009), Icarus (2010)
- Steven Seagal = On Deadly Ground (1994)
- Sylvester Stallone = Rambo (2008), The Expendables (2010)
- Jean-Claude Van Damme = The Quest (1996), Full Love (TBA)
- Donnie Yen = Legend of the Wolf (1997), Ballistic Kiss (1998), Shanghai Affairs (1998)
- Biao Yuen = Peacock King (1989), A Kid from Tibet (1992)
