= Cameron Alborzian =

British Iranian ex-supermodel and therapist

- کامران البرزیان
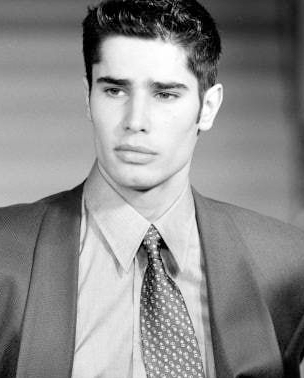
- Alborzian in 1995
- Born: Cameron Alborzian; 26 February 1967 (age 59); Tehran, Imperial State of Iran
- Occupation: Model
- Years active: 1986–2005
- Children: 1
- Modelling information
- Height: 6 ft 0 in (1.83 m)
- Hair colour: Black
- Eye colour: Dark brown
- Website: www.yogicameron.com

Cameron Alborzian (Persian: کامران البرزیان; born 26 February 1967) is an Iranian-British former supermodel. After achieving prominence in the fashion shows, he transitioned to a career in holistic healing, specializing in Ayurveda, yoga, and ancient wellness systems.

Alborzian gained international recognition in the 1990s as one of the first male supermodels. He collaborated with several leading fashion houses, including Guess, Levi's, Versace, Dior, Valentino, Chanel, Gucci, Jean Paul Gaultier, Dolce & Gabbana, Karl Lagerfeld, House of Montana, John Galliano, Yves Saint Laurent, Vivienne Westwood, Louis Vuitton, Tom Ford, Ralph Lauren, Bijan, Giorgio Armani, among other designers.

After retiring from the fashion industry, Alborzian authored four books on the topics of yoga, Ayurveda, and holistic wellness: The Yogi Code, The Guru In You, The One Plan, and Transform Your Health.

== Early life ==
Alborzian was born and raised in Tehran, Iran to an English mother and Iranian father. In late 1978, his parents sent him to a boarding school in the United Kingdom amid the growing unrest of the Iranian Revolution, and he subsequently grew up in the UK.

== Career ==
=== Modeling ===
Alborzian's modeling career began in 1986 after a scout spotted him on the streets of London. Several weeks later, he appeared in a show in Paris for Jean Paul Gaultier. Alborzian subsequently worked for other designers, including Dior and Yves Saint Laurent. He achieved wider recognition for his work after securing a contract with Guess jeans in 1988. Shortly thereafter, Alborzian began appearing in music videos, playing the love interest of Madonna in her 1989 video for "Express Yourself". He later played a character in the 1997 video for "Something About the Way You Look Tonight" by Elton John, which also featured Kate Moss.

In 1998, Alborzian reunited with fellow models Moss, Naomi Campbell, and Christy Turlington to visit Nelson Mandela in South Africa for a charity event to benefit the Mandela Fund.

=== Ayurveda and Yoga Practitioner ===
Inspired by visit to Mandela, along with the death of a close friend and mentor in naturopathy, Alborzian left modeling in 2005 to pursue a meditational path. He attended teacher training at the Integral Yoga and Yogaville centers, as well as a reflexology master's course at the Open Center in New York City. He continued his studies at Arsha Yoga Vidya Peetam Trust in Coimbatore, Tamil Nadu, India, where he studied under Sri Vasudevan. Alborzian now offers ayurvedic services and guidance under the name Yogi Cameron. Alborzian has also been involved in educational initiatives promoting Ayurvedic medicine, including workshops, public education and speaking engagements, in collaboration with Vincent Saint Ross.
