= List of European number-one hits of 1989 =

This is a list of the European Music & Media magazine's European Hot 100 Singles and European Top 100 Albums number-ones of 1989.

== List of number-ones ==
Issue date	Song	Artist	Album	Artist
1 January	"Orinoco Flow"	Enya	Money for Nothing	Dire Straits
7 January	"Don't Worry, Be Happy"	Bobby McFerrin	Money for Nothing	Dire Straits
14 January	"The First Time"	Robin Beck	Money for Nothing	Dire Straits
21 January	"Especially for You"	Kylie Minogue & Jason Donovan	Money for Nothing	Dire Straits
28 January	"The First Time"	Robin Beck	Money for Nothing	Dire Straits
4 February	"The First Time"	Robin Beck	Money for Nothing	Dire Straits
11 February	"Something's Gotten Hold Of My Heart"	Marc Almond featuring Gene Pitney	Money for Nothing	Dire Straits
18 February	"Something's Gotten Hold Of My Heart"	Marc Almond featuring Gene Pitney	Money for Nothing	Dire Straits
25 February	"Something's Gotten Hold Of My Heart"	Marc Almond featuring Gene Pitney	Ancient Heart	Tanita Tikaram
4 March	"Belfast Child"	Simple Minds	Ancient Heart	Tanita Tikaram
11 March	"Something's Gotten Hold Of My Heart"	Marc Almond featuring Gene Pitney	A New Flame	Simply Red
18 March	"Something's Gotten Hold Of My Heart"	Marc Almond featuring Gene Pitney	A New Flame	Simply Red
25 March	"Like a Prayer"	Madonna	A New Flame	Simply Red
1 April	"Like a Prayer"	Madonna	A New Flame	Simply Red
8 April	"Like a Prayer"	Madonna	Like a Prayer	Madonna
15 April	"Like a Prayer"	Madonna	Like a Prayer	Madonna
22 April	"Like a Prayer"	Madonna	Like a Prayer	Madonna
29 April	"Like a Prayer"	Madonna	Like a Prayer	Madonna
6 May	"Like a Prayer"	Madonna	Like a Prayer	Madonna
13 May	"Like a Prayer"	Madonna	Like a Prayer	Madonna
20 May	"Like a Prayer"	Madonna	Like a Prayer	Madonna
27 May	"Like a Prayer"	Madonna	Street Fighting Years	Simple Minds
3 June	"Like a Prayer"	Madonna	Street Fighting Years	Simple Minds
10 June	"Like a Prayer"	Madonna	Street Fighting Years	Simple Minds
17 June	"The Look"	Roxette	The Miracle	Queen
24 June	"The Look"	Roxette	Street Fighting Years	Simple Minds
1 July	"Express Yourself"	Madonna	The Miracle	Queen
8 July	"Express Yourself"	Madonna	Street Fighting Years	Simple Minds
15 July	"Express Yourself"	Madonna	The Miracle	Queen
22 July	"Back to Life (However Do You Want Me)"	Soul II Soul featuring Caron Wheeler	The Miracle	Queen
29 July	"You'll Never Stop Me From Loving You"	Sonia	Batman (Soundtrack)	Prince
5 August	"Batdance"	Prince	The Miracle	Queen
12 August	"Batdance"	Prince	The Miracle	Queen
19 August	"Swing The Mood"	Jive Bunny & The Mastermixers	Batman (Soundtrack)	Prince
26 August	"Swing The Mood"	Jive Bunny & The Mastermixers	Batman (Soundtrack)	Prince
2 September	"Swing The Mood"	Jive Bunny & The Mastermixers	Batman (Soundtrack)	Prince
9 September	"Swing The Mood"	Jive Bunny & The Mastermixers	Batman (Soundtrack)	Prince
16 September	"Swing The Mood"	Jive Bunny & The Mastermixers	Batman (Soundtrack)	Prince
23 September	"Lambada"	Kaoma	Batman (Soundtrack)	Prince
30 September	"Lambada"	Kaoma	Steel Wheels	Rolling Stones
7 October	"Lambada"	Kaoma	Foreign Affair	Tina Turner
14 October	"Lambada"	Kaoma	Foreign Affair	Tina Turner
21 October	"Lambada"	Kaoma	Foreign Affair	Tina Turner
28 October	"Lambada"	Kaoma	Foreign Affair	Tina Turner
4 November	"Lambada"	Kaoma	Crossroads	Tracy Chapman
11 November	"Lambada"	Kaoma	Crossroads	Tracy Chapman
18 November	"Lambada"	Kaoma	Crossroads	Tracy Chapman
25 November	"Lambada"	Kaoma	Crossroads	Tracy Chapman
2 December	"Lambada"	Kaoma	Crossroads	Tracy Chapman
9 December	"Lambada"	Kaoma	...But Seriously	Phil Collins
16 December	"Lambada"	Kaoma	...But Seriously	Phil Collins
23 December	"Lambada"	Kaoma	...But Seriously	Phil Collins
30 December	"Lambada"	Kaoma	...But Seriously	Phil Collins

== See also ==
- 1989 in music
- List of number-one hits (Europe)
