= Yvonne Tasker =

British author and professor (born 1964)

Yvonne Tasker (born 1964) is an English scholar in the field of film studies, gender and the media. She co-authored Interrogating Postfeminism: Gender and the Politics of Popular Culture which has become a foundational text of postfeminism and popular culture. She has lectured at the University of East Anglia and the University of Leeds.

== Academic career ==
Tasker completed her PhD in Film Studies at the University of Warwick.

Tasker was previously professor of film studies and dean of the Faculty of Arts and Humanities at University of East Anglia. She is currently professor of media and communication in the School of Media and Communication at the University of Leeds.

== Writing ==
Tasker is a scholar in the field of film studies, gender and the media, and the politics of popular culture. She is the author of a number of books which have made a contribution to the field of film studies including Spectacular Bodies, Working Girls: Gender and Sexuality in Popular Cinema, Action and Adventure Cinema, Soldiers' Stories: Military Women in Cinema and Television Since World War II, and Gendering the Recession: Media Culture in an Age of Austerity. She has contributed to the book Femme Fatalities: Representations of Strong Women in the Media.

Tasker also co-wrote, with Diane Negra, professor of film and television studies at the University of East Anglia, Interrogating Postfeminism: Gender and the Politics of Popular Culture (Duke University Press, 2007), which has become a foundational text of post feminism and popular culture.

Her current research includes the Arts and Humanities Research Council–funded project Jill Craigie: Film Pioneer, which explores the career of British documentary maker Jill Craigie. The project is in partnership with Lizzie Thynne (University of Sussex) and Sadie Wearing (London School of Economics) and will create an experimental film biography of Craigie and a co-authored book.
