= Like a Prayer (song) =

1989 single by Madonna

- 7-inch vinyl and CD variant of standard artwork

Single by Madonna

from the album Like a Prayer
- B-side: "Act of Contrition"
- Released: March 3, 1989
- Recorded: September 1988 – January 1989
- Studio: Johnny Yuma Recording (Burbank, California)
- Genre: Pop rock; dance-pop; gospel
- Length: 5:41 (Album Version); 5:19 (Single Version)
- Label: Sire; Warner Bros.
- Songwriters: Madonna; Patrick Leonard
- Producers: Madonna; Patrick Leonard

Madonna singles chronology
"Spotlight" (1988)	"Like a Prayer" (1989)	"Express Yourself" (1989)

Music video
- "Like a Prayer" on YouTube

"Like a Prayer" is a song by American singer Madonna from her fourth studio album, Like a Prayer (1989). It was released as the album's lead single on March 3, 1989, by Sire Records. Written and produced by both Madonna and Patrick Leonard, the song heralded an artistic and personal approach to songwriting for Madonna, who believed that she needed to cater more to her adult audience.

"Like a Prayer" is a pop rock, dance-pop, and gospel song that also incorporates elements of funk. It features background vocals from a choir and also a rock guitar. The lyrics contain liturgical words, but they have been interpreted by some people to have dual meanings of sexual innuendo and religion. "Like a Prayer" was acclaimed by music critics upon release and was a global commercial success, topping the charts of twenty countries, including Australia, Brazil, Canada, Italy, Mexico, New Zealand, Spain and the United Kingdom. In the United States, it became Madonna's seventh number-one hit on the Billboard Hot 100, topping the chart for three consecutive weeks. Rolling Stone listed "Like a Prayer" among "The 500 Greatest Songs of All Time".

The accompanying music video for "Like a Prayer", directed by Mary Lambert, shows Madonna witnessing a white woman being sexually assaulted and subsequently killed by a group of white men. While a black man is wrongfully arrested for the crime, Madonna hides in a church for safety, seeking strength to go forth as a witness, which she eventually does. The video depicts a church and Catholic imagery such as stigmata. It also features burning crosses and Madonna kissing a black saint. The Vatican condemned the video, while family and religious groups protested against its broadcast. They boycotted products by soft drink manufacturer Pepsi, who had used the song in their commercial. Pepsi canceled their sponsorship contract with Madonna, but allowed her to retain the $5 million fee.

"Like a Prayer" has been featured on six of Madonna's concert tours, most recently on The Celebration Tour. The song has been covered by numerous artists. Along with the parent album, "Like a Prayer" was a turning point in Madonna's career, with critics starting to acknowledge her as an artist rather than a mere pop star. "Like a Prayer" was included on Madonna's greatest hits compilation albums The Immaculate Collection (1990), Celebration (2009) and Finally Enough Love: 50 Number Ones (2022).

== Background and inspiration ==
Madonna had not recorded any music throughout most of 1988. Following the critical and commercial failure of back-to-back big-budget films, Shanghai Surprise (1986) and Who's That Girl (1987), she acted in the Broadway production of Speed-the-Plow. However, the unfavorable reviews once again caused her discomfort. Following a tumultuous marriage to Sean Penn, the couple filed for divorce in January 1989. Madonna had also turned 30, the age at which her mother had died, and thus the singer experienced more emotional turmoil. The song functioned as a form of creative coping with the early death of her mother and as a lasting tribute to her memory. Madonna commented in the March 1989 issue of Rolling Stone that her Catholic upbringing struck a feeling of guilt in her all the time:

"Once you're a Catholic, you're always a Catholic—in terms of your feelings of guilt and remorse and whether you've sinned or not. Sometimes I'm wracked with guilt when I needn't be, and that, to me, is left over from my Catholic upbringing. Because in Catholicism you are born a sinner and you are a sinner all of your life. No matter how you try to get away from it, the sin is within you all the time."

Madonna also understood that as she was growing up, so was her core audience. Feeling the need to attempt something different, she wanted the sound of her new album to dictate what could be popular in the music world. Madonna had certain personal matters on her mind that she thought could be the musical direction of the album. For the title track, the singer chose topics that until then had been personal meditations never shared with the general public. She perused her personal journals and diaries, and began considering options. Madonna recalled, "What was it I wanted to say? I wanted the album to speak to things on my mind. It was a complex time in my life."

== Development ==
"I think there was a point when we realized that it was the title track, and the lead track, and it was going to be a powerhouse. It became obvious that there was something unique about it. And that somehow we made this thing work: with its stopping and starting, and a minimalistic rhythmic thing, and the verses, and these bombastic choruses, and this giant choir comes in. This is ambitious, you know?"

— Patrick Leonard's thoughts on "Like a Prayer".

As Madonna considered her alternatives, Patrick Leonard and Stephen Bray were experimenting with instrumentals and musical ideas for her consideration. Both producers wanted to bring their unique style to the project and composed music for the title track. Eventually, Madonna felt that the music presented to her by Leonard was more interesting, and she started to work with him. Once Madonna had conceptualized the way she would interpose her ideas with the music, she wrote "Like a Prayer" in about three hours, and it became the first song developed for the record. Madonna has described "Like a Prayer" as the song of a passionate young girl "so in love with God that it is almost as though He were the male figure in her life".

Madonna's further inspiration for the song came from the Catholic belief of transubstantiation. She introduced liturgical words in the song, but changed the context so that the lyrics had dual meaning. In addition to superficial pop lyrics about sexuality and religion on the surface, "Like a Prayer" contained a secondary meaning beneath to provoke reaction from her listeners. Leonard explained that he was not comfortable with the lyrics and the sexual innuendos present in it. He gave the example of the first verse for "Like a Prayer" which goes "When you call my name, It's like a little prayer, I'm down on my knees, I wanna take you there". Leonard saw that this could also refer to someone performing fellatio; aghast, he requested that Madonna change the line, but she was adamant about keeping it.

== Recording ==
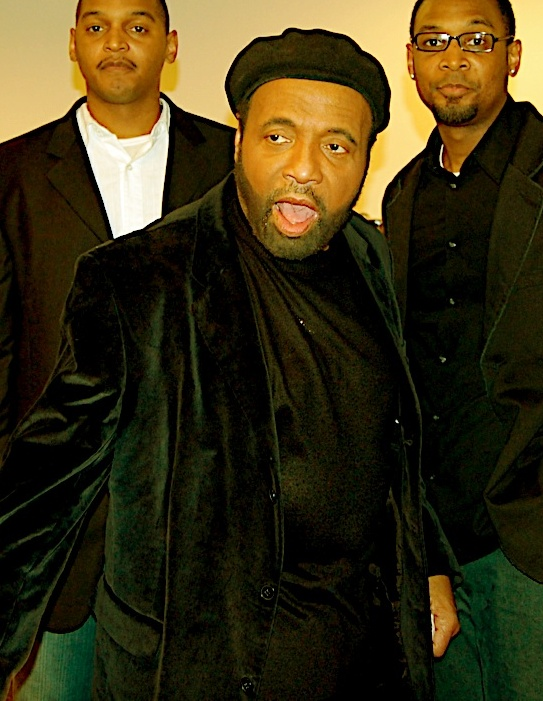
Andraé Crouch and his choir were signed for adding background vocals to "Like a Prayer". Crouch studied the song's lyrics to make sure that it was not against their religious beliefs.

Madonna wanted to have gospel music as part of "Like a Prayer", with virtually no instrumentation, only the sound of an organ and her singing. She started experimenting using just her vocals, prior to the bridge being composed. After the full song was finalized, Madonna and Leonard decided to record it alongside a choir around September 1988. Both of them met with Andraé Crouch and vocalist Roberto Noriega, and signed their choir to provide background vocals. Crouch scrutinized the lyrics as he wanted to "find out what the intention of the song might be. We're very particular in choosing what we work with, and we liked what we heard". At Jonny Yuma Recording, he got his choir together and explained to them what they needed to do during the recording session. He had listened to the demo of "Like a Prayer" in his automobile, and directed the choir accordingly. The choir was recorded separately, and Leonard wanted it to be added during post-production.

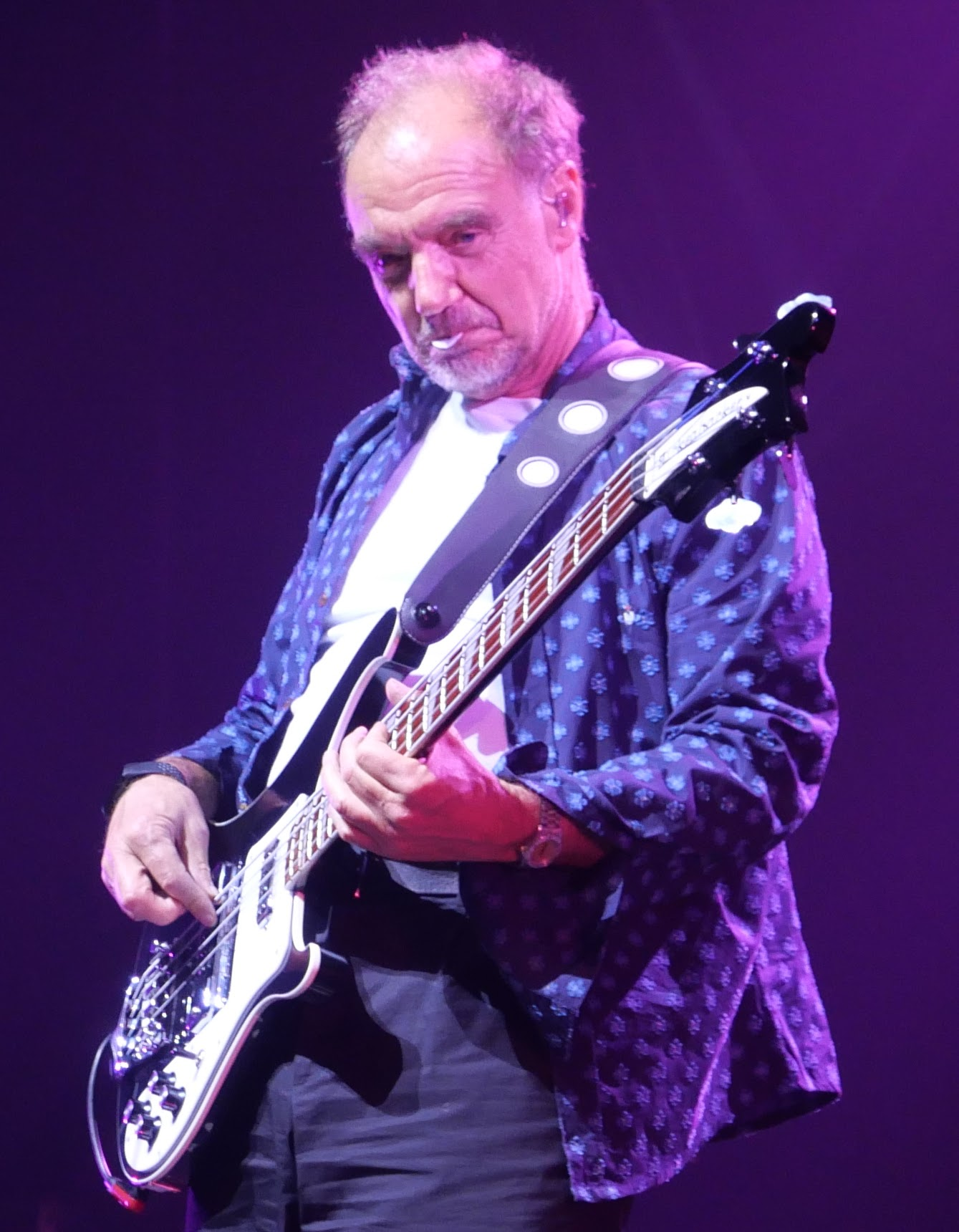
British bassist Guy Pratt (pictured in 2022) played in the song, and other album tracks.

Recording took more time than usual since Madonna and Leonard fought "tooth and nail" in the studio. According to Lucy O'Brien, Madonna wanted to prove that her second chance as a record producer (following her previous album True Blue) was not a fluke. Leonard started working on the chord changes for the verses and the chorus. He had hired guitarist Bruce Gaitsch and bass guitar player Guy Pratt to work on the song. Pratt had in turn hired some additional drummers. On the day of the recording, the drummers canceled, which irritated Madonna, and she started shouting and swearing profusely at Leonard and Pratt. Pratt then hired the Englishman Chester Kamen, along with Americans David Williams and Dann Huff. He commented that the choice was deliberate since he was a fan of British rock music, and wanted that kind of attitude and quirkiness of the musicians in "Like a Prayer", as well as the other songs of the record. Pratt was not fired, but later he realized that Madonna did not forgive him; she would call him late at night for his opinion, and urgently ask him to come to the recording studio, only to be dismissed.

Madonna had her own opinion of how the different musical instruments should be played to achieve the sound that she envisioned. Pratt recalled that after the middle chorus was recorded, she notified the musicians of some changes in the production. "Jonathan, do less of the high-hat in the middle eight, and more of a fill towards the end. Guy, I want duck eggs [semibreves] on the end, and Chester, bring in your guitar on the second verse", she instructed. The team checked the instructions once more, and did a final recording with vocals and one with the strings. Gaitsch heard Madonna telling Leonard that no further recording was to be done for the song. Leonard then gave the recording to Bill Bottrell for the mixing process. But the producer felt that the bongos and the Latin Percussion would sound really mismatched if Crouch's choir was added, so he removed them. For the introduction, Leonard used some guitar recordings by Prince, who had been asked by Madonna to contribute to the song. He recalled in 2014 that no other music by Prince was used on the release, but some effects around the choruses might have been his. Shep Pettibone and Bill Bottrell remixed the 12-inch versions of the song with more of Prince’s guitar playing featured.

== Composition and lyrics ==
"Like a Prayer" is a pop rock, dance-pop, and gospel song that also incorporates elements of funk. According to the sheet music published in Musicnotes.com, the song follows a time signature of common time, and is composed in the key of D minor, with a moderate tempo of 120 beats per minute. Madonna's vocal range spans from A_{3} to F_{5}. "Like a Prayer" starts with a Dm–C/D–Gm/D–Dm chord progression in the intro. The original album version features bass guitar by Guy Pratt doubled by an analog Minimoog bass synthesizer, while the 7-inch edit version has a different bass part played by Randy Jackson. "Like a Prayer" was also remixed by Shep Pettibone for the 12-inch single release; a re-edited version of Pettibone's remix is featured on Madonna's first greatest hits album, The Immaculate Collection (1990).

"Like a Prayer"
A 30-second sample of "Like a Prayer", featuring Madonna singing the hymn-like first verse, which is complemented by percussion instruments. It then leads to a gospel-oriented phase, with virtually no instrumentation – only the sound of the choir, after which Madonna starts singing the bridge.

The song begins with the sound of a heavy rock guitar that is suddenly cut off after a few seconds, and replaced with the choir and the sound of an organ. Madonna sings the opening lines accompanied by light percussion, as drums start during the first verse. The percussion and the choir sound are added interchangeably between the verses and the bridge, until the second chorus. At this point, the guitars start flickering from left to right, accompanied by a bassline. Rikky Rooksby, author of The Complete Guide to the Music of Madonna, commented that "Like a Prayer" was the most complex song that Madonna had ever attempted at that point. He believed that the complexity builds up more after the second chorus, when the choir fully supports Madonna's vocals and she re-utters the opening lines, but this time accompanied by a synthesizer and drum beats. While singing "Just like a prayer, Your voice can take me there, Just like a muse to me, You are a mystery", an R&B-influenced voice backs Madonna. The song ends with a final repetition of the chorus and the choir gradually fading out.

J. Randy Taraborrelli noted in his book Madonna: An Intimate Biography that the lyrics of the song consist of "a series of button-pushing anomalies". With Madonna's inclusion of double entendres in the lyrics, "Like a Prayer" sounded religious to him but has an undertone of sexual tension. This was demonstrated by the use of a gospel choir, whose voice heightens the song's spiritual nature, while the rock guitar sound keeps it dark and mysterious. For Lucy O'Brien, the lyrics describe Madonna receiving a vocation from God. Certain portions of the lyrics also alluded to Sean Penn and their failed marriage. According to Priya Elan from NME, the line "Just like a muse to me, You are a mystery" was an example of this, befitting the description of an unattainable lover. This was also evident in the artwork for the 12-inch single, painted by her brother, Christopher Ciccone. It shows the letters "MLVC", standing for Madonna's full name, Madonna Louise Veronica Ciccone, with a prominent letter "P" for Penn, detached from the group.

== Critical reception ==
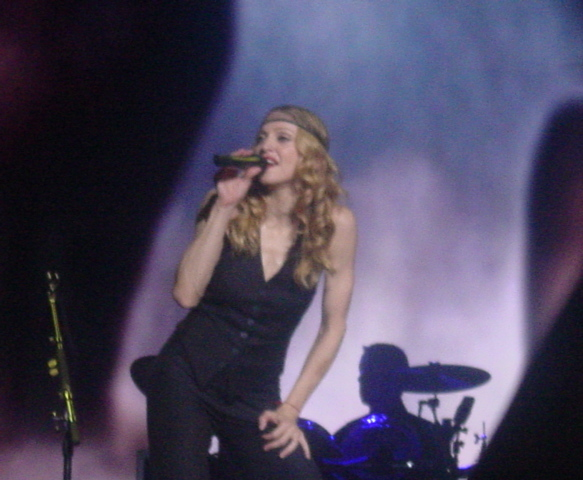
During the 2004 Re-Invention World Tour, "Like a Prayer" was given a gospel treatment, with Madonna asking the audience to sing along with her.

Following the release of "Like a Prayer" on March 3, 1989, it received widespread acclaim from critics, journalists and academics. J. Randy Taraborrelli commented that the song "deserved every bit of the curiosity it generated. While being devilishly danceable, the song also shows Madonna's uncanny ability to inspire strong, conflicting emotions during the course of a single song, leaving the listener scratching his head for answers—and craving for more." Stephen Holden from The New York Times, while writing about Madonna's re-invention of her image, observed how her sound had changed from the "simple blaring dance-pop to the rich, fully rounded pop of 'Like a Prayer'". Lucy O'Brien felt that the most remarkable aspect of "Like a Prayer" was Madonna's usage of liturgical words. "There is the surface meaning, forging sexuality with pop lyrics that sound so sweet. But underlying that is a rigorous meditation on prayer. In shorter words, 'Like a Prayer' really takes you there", O'Brien concluded. This view was shared by Mary Cross, who wrote in her biography of Madonna that "the song is a mix of the sacred and the profane. There-in lies Madonna's triumph with 'Like a Prayer'. It still sounds catchy and danceable."

From the academic world, positive reviews came from Michael Campbell, author of Popular Music in America: And the Beat Goes On, who felt that the soothing melody of the song resembles Steve Winwood's 1986 single "Higher Love". Campbell noted the song for merging disparate and contradictory musical features in it. He found that the simple melody of "Like a Prayer" offered an easy listen, but the contrasts in sound, rhythm and texture appealed to different target audiences. Toby Creswell wrote in his book 1001 Songs that "'Like a Prayer' is a beautifully crafted devotional song in the guise of perfect pop. God is the drum machine here." Georges Claude Guilbert, author of Madonna as Postmodern Myth: How One Star's Self-Construction Rewrites Sex, Gender, Hollywood and the American Dream, noted that there is a polysemy in "Like a Prayer" since Madonna addresses either God or her lover, and in doing so "Madonna achieves the gold-card of attaining her own divinity. Whenever someone calls her name, it alludes to the song." Andrew Greeley compared "Like a Prayer" with the biblical Song of Songs. Greeley, although focusing more on the accompanying music video, acknowledged the fact that sexual passion may be revelatory, and complimented Madonna for glorifying ideologies of female subjectivity and womanhood in the song.

Positive reviews also came from contemporary music critics. Stephen Thomas Erlewine from AllMusic called the song "haunting" and felt that it displayed a commanding sense of Madonna's songcraft. According to Rolling Stone's Gavin Edwards, it sounded glorious and "is the most transgressive—and the most irresistible" song of Madonna's career. Jim Farber from Entertainment Weekly commented that the "gospel-infused title track demonstrates that [the singer's] writing and performing had been raised to heavenly new heights". In a review for Madonna's first greatest hits album, The Immaculate Collection (1990), David Browne of the same publication wrote about the composition, which he felt "added poignancy to its spiritual lyrics". Also from Entertainment Weekly, Chuck Arnold wrote that "from the moment Madonna sings atop that solemn organ and the hushed tones of a choir, 'Like a Prayer' goes on to achieve a spiritual transcendence that makes this her supreme single [...] balancing the sacred and the secular to ecstatic effect, the whole thing takes you there again and again." Sal Cinquemani from Slant Magazine was impressed with the song's production, complimenting its "church-like" reverence and the religious sentiments. Writing for Billboard, Katie Atkinson ranked it as Madonna's second-greatest song: "One of the main reasons the lyrics work so well is that she could be singing about a monogamous relationship, a powerful sexual connection, a platonic loved one, or even God him (or her) self [...] Life might be a mystery, but the mastery of this song is irrefutable."

== Commercial performance ==
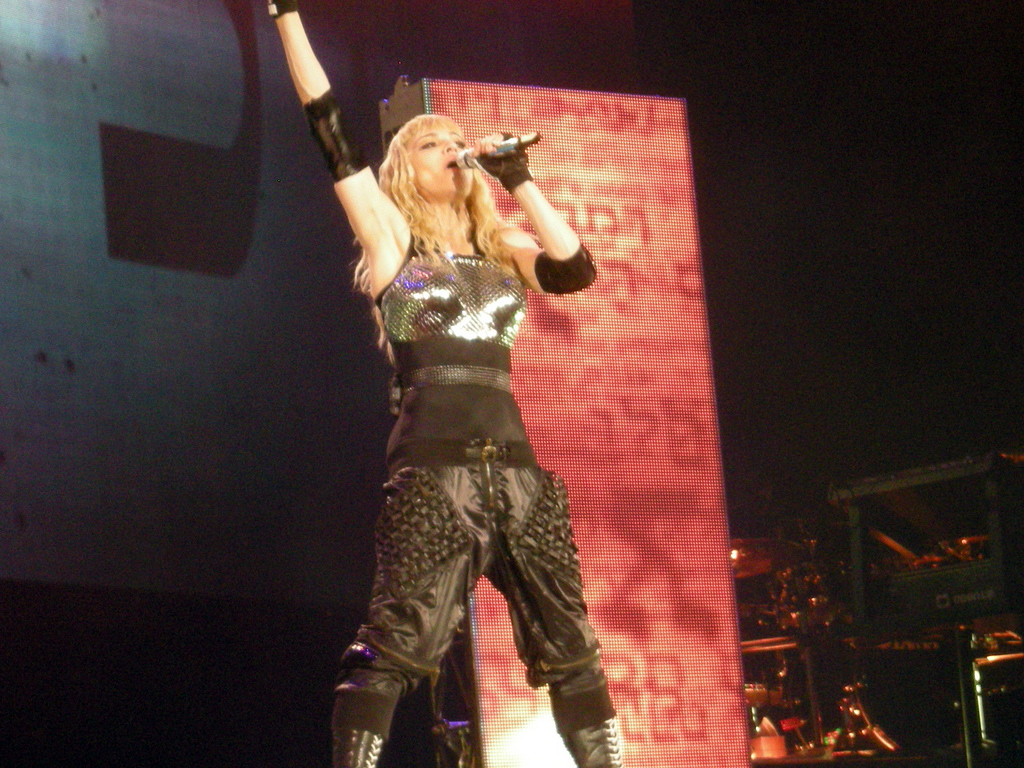
Madonna performing a remixed version of "Like a Prayer" during the Amsterdam stop of her Sticky & Sweet Tour on September 2, 2008

In the United States, "Like a Prayer" debuted at number 38 on the Billboard Hot 100, and reached the top of the chart on the issue dated April 22, 1989. It stayed at the top for three weeks, before being replaced by Bon Jovi's "I'll Be There for You". It also topped the Dance Club Play chart, while reaching number three on the Adult Contemporary chart and number 20 on the Hot Black Singles chart. "Like a Prayer" was ranked at number 25 on the Hot 100 year-end chart for 1989, and was certified 2× Platinum by the Recording Industry Association of America (RIAA) in July 2024, for shipment of two million copies. According to Nielsen SoundScan, the song has also sold 1.1 million digital downloads as of December 2016.

In Canada, "Like a Prayer" reached the top of the RPM 100 Singles chart in its seventh week, earning Madonna her eighth number-one single in the country. Additionally, it held at number one for five consecutive weeks, becoming the singer's longest running number-one in the nation. The track was present on the chart for 17 weeks and ranked as the top-selling single of 1989 on the year-end chart.

In Australia, "Like a Prayer" debuted on the ARIA Singles Chart at number three on March 19, 1989. The next week it reached the top of the chart, and stayed there for another four weeks. The single was present for a total of 22 weeks on the chart, and was certified Platinum by the Australian Recording Industry Association (ARIA), for shipment of 70,000 copies. It was also the top-selling single for 1989 in Australia. In New Zealand, "Like a Prayer" had a similar run as in Australia, by debuting at number three on the RIANZ Singles Chart, and reaching the top of the chart the next week. The single was present for a total of 13 weeks on the chart. It became Madonna's seventh number-one hit in Japan, and occupied the top position of the Oricon Singles Chart for three weeks.

In the United Kingdom, "Like a Prayer" entered the UK Singles Chart at number two, before moving to the top the next week, remaining there for three weeks. Madonna became the artist with the most UK number-one singles of the 1980s, with a total of six number-one hits. "Like a Prayer" became the eleventh best-selling single of 1989 in the United Kingdom, and was certified 3× Platinum by the British Phonographic Industry (BPI), for shipment of 1,800,000 copies. According to the Official Charts Company, the single has sold 850,500 copies there as of April 2019. In Italy, "Like a Prayer" spent nine consecutive weeks at the top of the Musica e dischi chart. Across Europe, it reached number one in Belgium, Ireland, Norway, Sweden and Switzerland. "Like a Prayer" was Madonna's fifth number-one hit on the Eurochart Hot 100, reaching the top on March 25, 1989, and staying at number one for 12 weeks. It ranked at number two on the 1989 tabulation for European singles. After the Glee episode "The Power of Madonna" was broadcast, the song again entered the chart at number 47 on May 15, 2010. Globally, "Like a Prayer" went on to sell over five million copies.

After the song's use in the 2024 film Deadpool & Wolverine, "Like a Prayer" received a sales resurgence; in the United Kingdom, the song peaked at number 27 on the UK Singles Chart, and at number 7 on the UK Singles Downloads Chart. The "Choir" version, featured on the EP dedicated to the song, reached number 1 on the TikTok Billboard Top 50 chart.

== Music video ==
=== Conception and filming ===
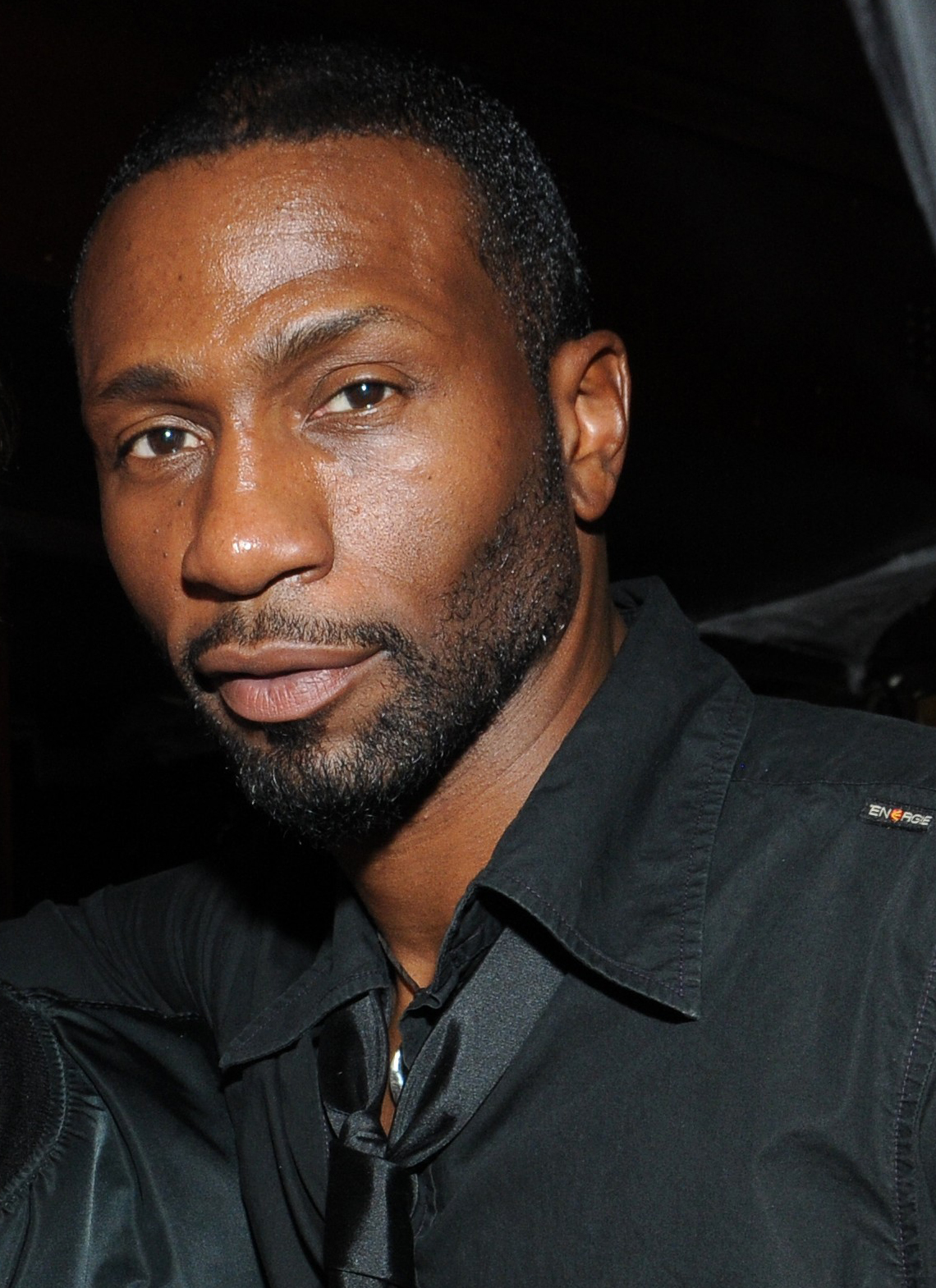
Leon Robinson was hired to play the role of a saint inspired by Martin de Porres, the patron saint of mixed-race people.

The highly controversial music video accompanying "Like a Prayer" was directed by Mary Lambert and was filmed in January 1989 at Raleigh Studios in Hollywood, California, and at San Pedro Hills in San Pedro, California. Madonna wanted the video to be more provocative than anything she had done before. She wanted to address racism by having the video depict a mixed-race couple being killed by the Ku Klux Klan, but on further thinking she chose another provocative theme to maintain the song's religious connotations. Madonna would play the song over and over again, and wanted the visuals to display:

[T]his story of a girl who was madly in love with a black man, set in South, with this forbidden interracial love affair. And the guy she's in love with sings in a choir. So she's obsessed with him and goes to the church all the time. And then it turned into a bigger story, which was about racism and bigotry.

Lambert had a different visual aspect of the song on her mind. She felt that it was more about ecstasy, especially a sexual one, and how it related to religious ecstasy. She listened to the song with Madonna a number of times and together decided to include the ecstasy part on the video. A sub-plot about Madonna as a homicide witness was included, which became the trigger for the sexual and religious ecstasy. Leon Robinson was hired to play the role of a saint; the part was inspired by Martin de Porres, the patron saint of mixed-race people and all those seeking interracial harmony.

The video was filmed over four days, with an extra day allotted for re-shooting some of the scenes. Originally, Lambert had casts taken of Robinson's face, hand, and feet to create the statue of the saint which would be used as a decoration. Robinson only enacted the live scenes. However, during post-production, Lambert found that the statue did not look like Robinson, who was asked to re-shoot the respective scenes. He had to act as the statue and required special make-up for the re-takes. Robinson recalled that standing like a statue was difficult since "first of all, I didn't realize how hard it is on the back to stand absolutely tall and straight and not move. Secondly, as a performer you have this nervous energy — and my requirements here were total antithesis of that."

Throughout the video, Madonna wears a cross and a cleavage-baring slip dress as outerwear that were symbolic of "wanting to be provocative." The dress was chosen by costume designer Marlene Stewart for its atypical structure, as it was made for Natalie Wood to be worn under a costume. Stewart said Madonna's Catholic upbringing was a big influence for the video: "If you follow the tenets of the religion, there is something about showing lingerie, wearing lingerie as outerwear, which is very sinful in some way. She was playing with and pushing that boundary."

=== Synopsis ===
Madonna in the music video for "Like a Prayer", singing in front of Ku Klux Klan-style burning crosses

The video begins with Madonna running and seeking safety in a church, while a black man is arrested. In the church, she sees a caged statue of a saint who resembles the black man on the street. As the song starts, she utters a prayer in front of the statue which appears to be crying. Madonna lies down on a pew and has a dream in which she is falling through the sky. Suddenly, a smiling black woman catches her and tosses her back up to the heavenly blue sky. Madonna returns to the statue, which becomes alive. The saint kisses her forehead and leaves the church as she picks up a knife and accidentally cuts herself, resulting on stigmata on her hands.

Interspersing scenes show Madonna singing and dancing wildly in front of burning crosses, kissing scenes between her and the saint, and Madonna being surrounded by a choir inside the church, led by the woman who caught her earlier. The video also shows what Madonna was running away from: a young white woman being assaulted and murdered by a group of white men. The murderers give Madonna a threatening look and leave. A black man walking down the alley also sees the crime and runs to help the dying woman, but the murderers flee and he is arrested by the arriving police. Inside of the church, Madonna wakes up, goes to the jail and tells the police that she had witnessed the crime and that the black man is innocent; the police release him. The video ends as Madonna dances in front of the burning crosses, and then everybody involved in the story line take a bow as curtains come down on the set.

=== Pepsi commercial ===
"I consider it a challenge to make a commercial that has some sort of artistic value. I like the challenge of merging art and commerce. As far as I'm concerned, making a video is also a commercial. The Pepsi spot is a different and great way to expose the record. Record companies just don't have the money to finance that kind of publicity.

— Madonna talking about why she chose to do the commercial.

In January 1989, while the music video was still being filmed, Pepsi-Cola announced that they had signed Madonna for a US$5 million deal to feature her and "Like a Prayer" for the company's television commercial. The deal also included Pepsi sponsoring Madonna's next world tour. Madonna wanted to use the commercial to launch "Like a Prayer" globally before its actual release—the first time something like this was being done in the music industry. According to the company's advertising head Alan Pottasch, "the global media buy and unprecedented debut of this long awaited single will put Pepsi first and foremost in consumer's [sic] minds". Madonna had initially refused to dance and sing in the commercial, but later accepted after being introduced to choreographer Vince Paterson.

Pepsi premiered the commercial during the global telecast of the 31st Annual Grammy Awards in February 1989. A week later, the advertisement was aired during NBC's sitcom The Cosby Show, which was one of the most popular shows of that time. Titled "Make a Wish", the two-minute commercial portrayed Madonna going back in time to her childhood memories. It starts as Madonna watches a video of her childhood birthday party. While reminiscing, she interchanges places with her young self. The young Madonna roams aimlessly around the grown-up Madonna's room, while the latter dances with her childhood friends on the street and inside a bar. The commercial continues as Madonna dances inside a church, surrounded by a choir and her child self discovering her old doll. As both of them are interchanged again, the grown-up Madonna looks towards the TV and says, "Go ahead, make a wish". Both the Madonnas raise their Pepsi cans to each other, and the young Madonna blows out the candles on her birthday cake.

An estimated 250 million people around the world viewed the commercial, which was directed by Joe Pytka. Pepsi-Cola Company spokesman Todd MacKenzie said that the advertisement was planned to be aired simultaneously in Europe, Asia, Australia and North America. Bob Garfield from the Advertising Age observed that from "Turkey to El Salvador to anytown USA, around 500 million eyes [were] glued to the TV screen." Leslie Savan from The Village Voice noted that the commercial qualified as a "hymn to the global capabilities of the age of electronic reproductions; it celebrates the pan-cultural ambitions of both soda pop and pop star".

The commercial re-aired for the first time in over 30 years at the 2023 MTV Video Music Awards. Madonna released a statement, which read, "34 years ago I made a commercial with Pepsi to celebrate the release of my song [...] The commercial was immediately canceled when I refused to change any scenes in the video where I was kissing a black saint or burning crosses. So began my illustrious career as an artist refusing to compromise my artistic integrity [...] artists are here to disturb the peace."

=== Reception and protests ===
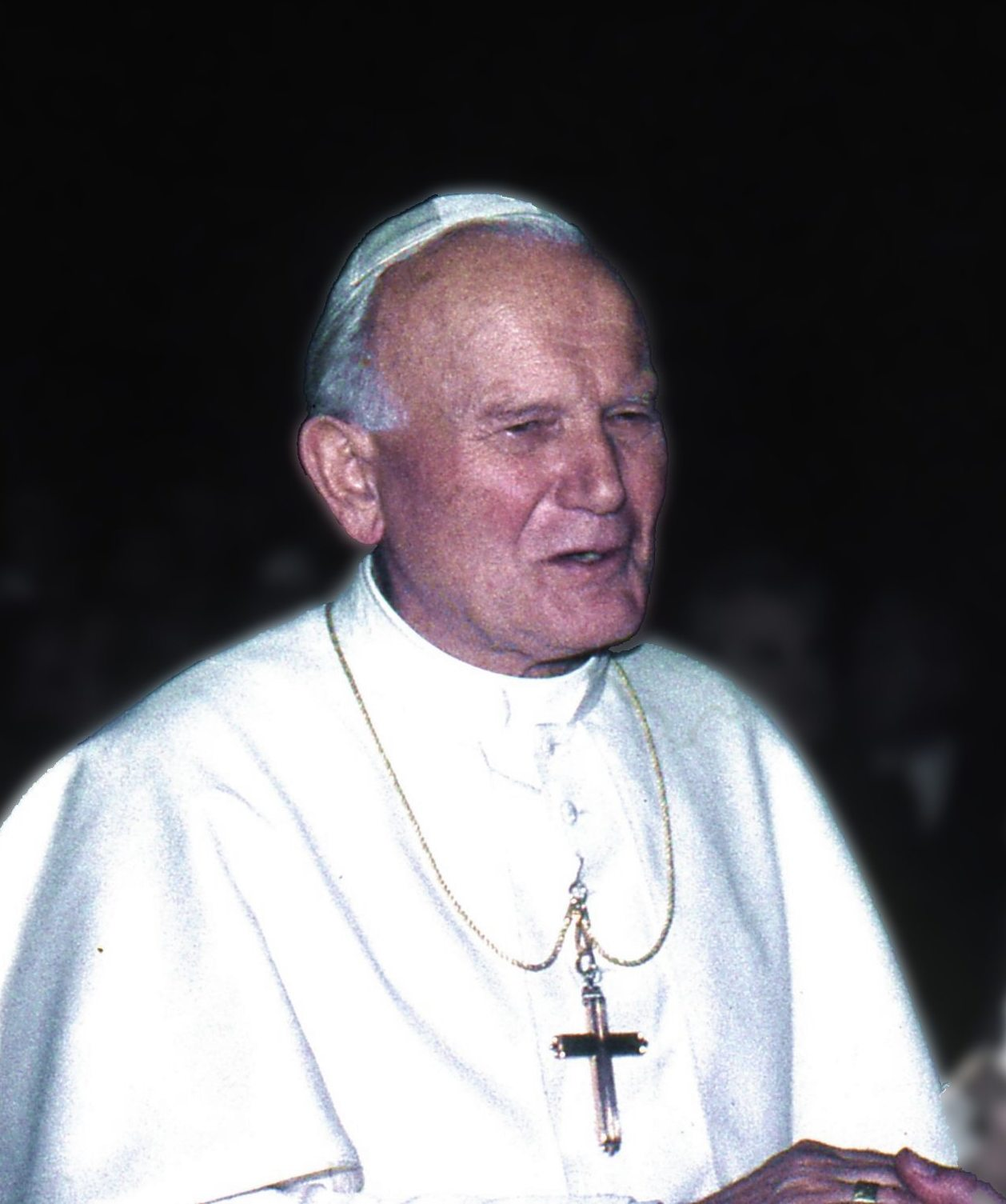
Pope John Paul II encouraged people to boycott Madonna in Italy.

The day after the Pepsi commercial was released, Madonna released the actual "Like a Prayer" music video on MTV. Christian groups worldwide including the Vatican protested against its broadcast and called for a global boycott of Pepsi and its subsidiaries, including KFC, Taco Bell and Pizza Hut. While the "Like a Prayer" Pepsi commercial portrayed Madonna as a wholesome all-American girl, the treatment for her actual music video contrasted sharply with its provocative use of religious imagery. Pepsi explained the differences between their advertisement and Madonna's artistic opinions. Ultimately, Pepsi gave in to the protests from hardline Christian groups and cancelled the campaign. According to Taraborrelli, Pepsi was so eager to extricate themselves from the controversy that they allowed Madonna to keep the $5 million advance.

While most TV stations banned the music video, MTV notably continued to air the video on heavy rotation. The controversies leading to her "Like a Prayer" video introduced the concept of free publicity and became a turning point where Madonna was viewed as a shrewd businesswoman who knew how to sell a concept. In the meantime, Pope John Paul II involved himself in the matter and encouraged fans to boycott Madonna in Italy. Protests from a small Catholic organization in the country prompted Italian state television network RAI and Madonna's record company WEA to not air the video there. The music video was also deemed offensive by the Christian fundamentalist American Family Association (AFA). Madonna stated that "art should be controversial, and that's all there is to it", about the controversy.

The music video received a mostly positive response from critics and journalists. Jamie Portman from The Daily Gazette felt that the video could be "vulnerable to charges of being blatantly provocative in its calculated blending of sex and religion". David Rosenthal from The Spokesman-Review found it as "visually stunning"; however, Edna Gundersen from USA Today did not understand the media mayhem behind the video. She pointed out that "Madonna is a good girl in the video. She saves someone. What is the big deal?..." Among music critics, Phil Kloer from Record-Journal felt that whether one condemns the video as anti-Christian or racist, "It's condemnable on the face of it because it exploits a symbol of evil [the burning crosses of the Ku Klux Klan] as a fabulous source of light and rake up album sales". Writing for the Los Angeles Times, Chris Willman complimented the music video for its portrayal of a love song, rather than blasphemy. He was more interested in the stigmata presented in the video.

=== Accolades ===
At the 1989 MTV Video Music Awards, the video for "Like a Prayer" was nominated in the Viewer's Choice and Video of the Year categories, winning the former. Coincidentally, the award show was sponsored by Pepsi that year, and when Madonna received the award onstage she added, "I would really like to thank Pepsi for causing so much controversy." It also topped video countdowns and critic lists. It was number one on MTV's countdown of "100 Videos That Broke the Rules" in 2005, and for the channel's 25th anniversary, viewers voted it as the "Most Groundbreaking Music Video of All Time". In addition, the video was ranked at number 20 on Rolling Stone's "The 100 Top Music Videos", and at number two on VH1's 100 Greatest Videos. Fuse TV named it one of its "10 Videos That Rocked the World". In a 2011 poll by Billboard, the video for "Like a Prayer" was voted the second-best music video of the 1980s, behind only Michael Jackson's "Thriller".

=== Themes and analysis ===
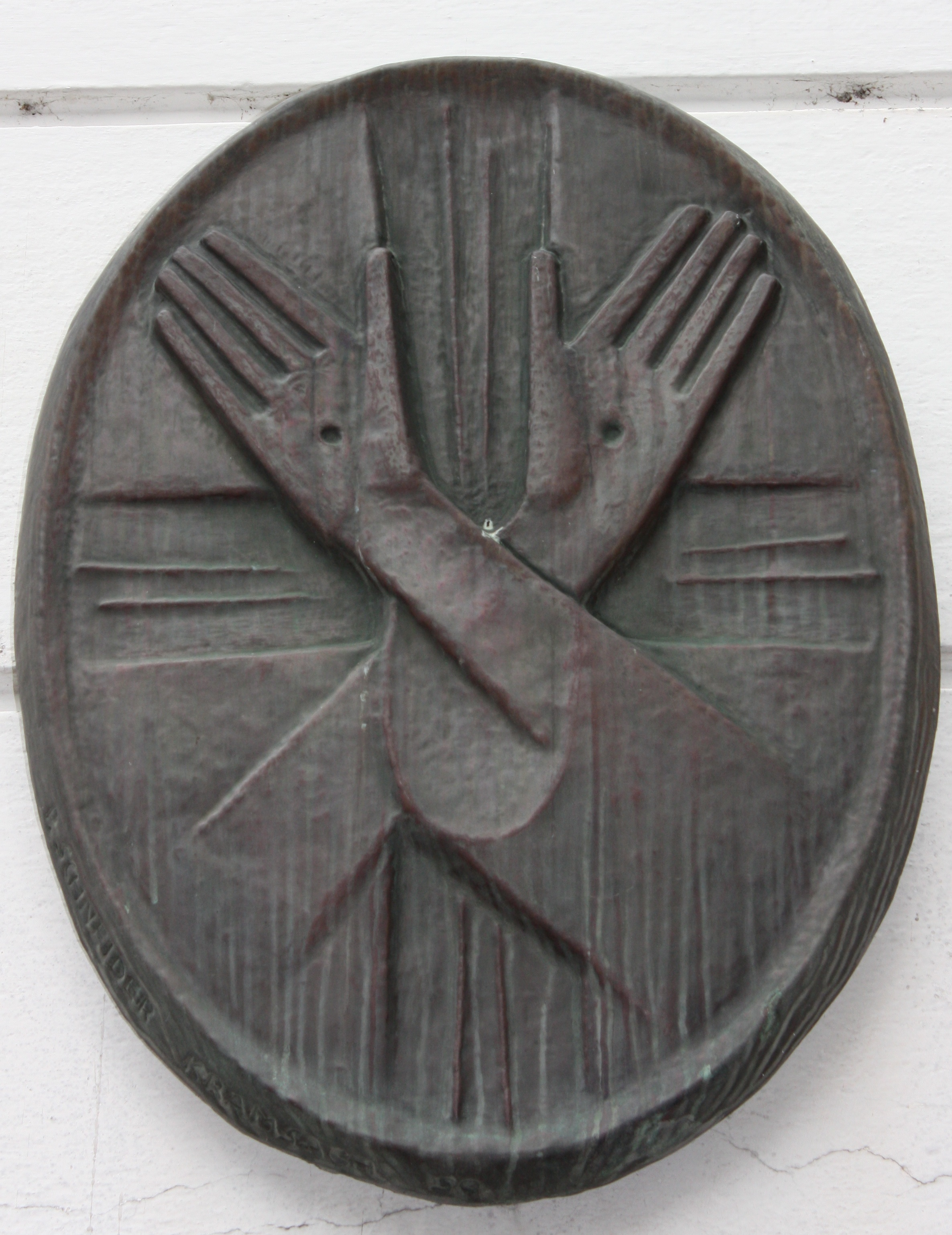
The sequence in the music video for "Like a Prayer" where Madonna cuts her hand with a dagger was believed by scholars as an enactment of stigmata.

Scholars and academics have offered different interpretations of the music video and its story line. Allen Metz, one of the authors of The Madonna Companion: Two Decades of Commentary, noted that when Madonna enters the church at the beginning of the clip, the line "I hear you call my name, And it feels like.... Home" is played. The women of Italian East Harlem in New York refer to their Church as la casa di momma (Momma's House). In that respect, Metz believed that Madonna alluded herself to be one from Harlem, but also refers herself as divinity returning to the Church. This divine aspect is further explored by Nicholas B. Dirks, author of Culture/power/history, who argued that Madonna falling into a dream is the most important point of the narrative as it signified that "Madonna is really not putting herself in place of the redeemer, but imagining herself as one."

Santiago Fouz-Hernández wrote in his book, Madonna's Drowned Worlds, that the Black woman who catches Madonna when she is falling through heaven in her dream, is a symbol for the divinity, as she helps Madonna throughout the video to come to the correct decision. Fouz-Hernández explained how the physical similarity between Madonna and woman indicated that it was actually Madonna's inner divinity which was rescuing her. When the singer accidentally cuts her hand on the dagger, it was described as receiving stigmata by scholar Robert McQueen Grant, who believed that the scene marked Madonna as having an important role to play in the narrative. This was evident when the crime scene is shown in detail, and an identification is established between Madonna and the victim. Freya Jarman-Ivens, coauthor with Fouz-Hernández, noted that the woman cries out for help when Madonna sings the line "When you call my name, It's like a little prayer". However, Madonna could not do anything thus portraying failure of divinity to save. Jarman-Ivens also noted the look between the gang member and Madonna, which she thought was a complicity of "White men rape/kill women, white men blame it on Black men; Women are raped/killed for being on the streets at night, Black men are nevertheless thrown in jail."

Other themes noted by Metz include the burning crosses scene, which he felt evoked the murder scene of three civil workers, portrayed in the 1988 American crime drama film Mississippi Burning. He also noted that when Madonna dances with the choir in the church altar, a young Black boy joins her. This was a reference to the only person who had protested against the Ku Klux Klan murders in Mississippi Burning, a Black man. For the author, it was symbolic of his protest being transferred in Madonna. Regarding the kissing scene between the saint and Madonna, Carol Benson observed that the "numerous cut-scenes of burning crosses, shocked face of Madonna, bleeding eye of the icon etc" made a point that multiple times in history, black men have been punished for kissing or desiring white women. Grant believed this was where the racial equality message of the video came across as most poignant. On the contrary, when the curtain falls and the scene shifts to a smiling Madonna among the burning crosses, professor Maury Dean felt that another explanation was inevitable. Madonna portrays a successful heroine and thus the whole video becomes about female empowerment.

When the music video first aired in Spain, viewers initially believed that Madonna was playing the role of a modern day Saint Mary Magdalen on account of the scenes showing her first falling and then rising.

== Live performances ==
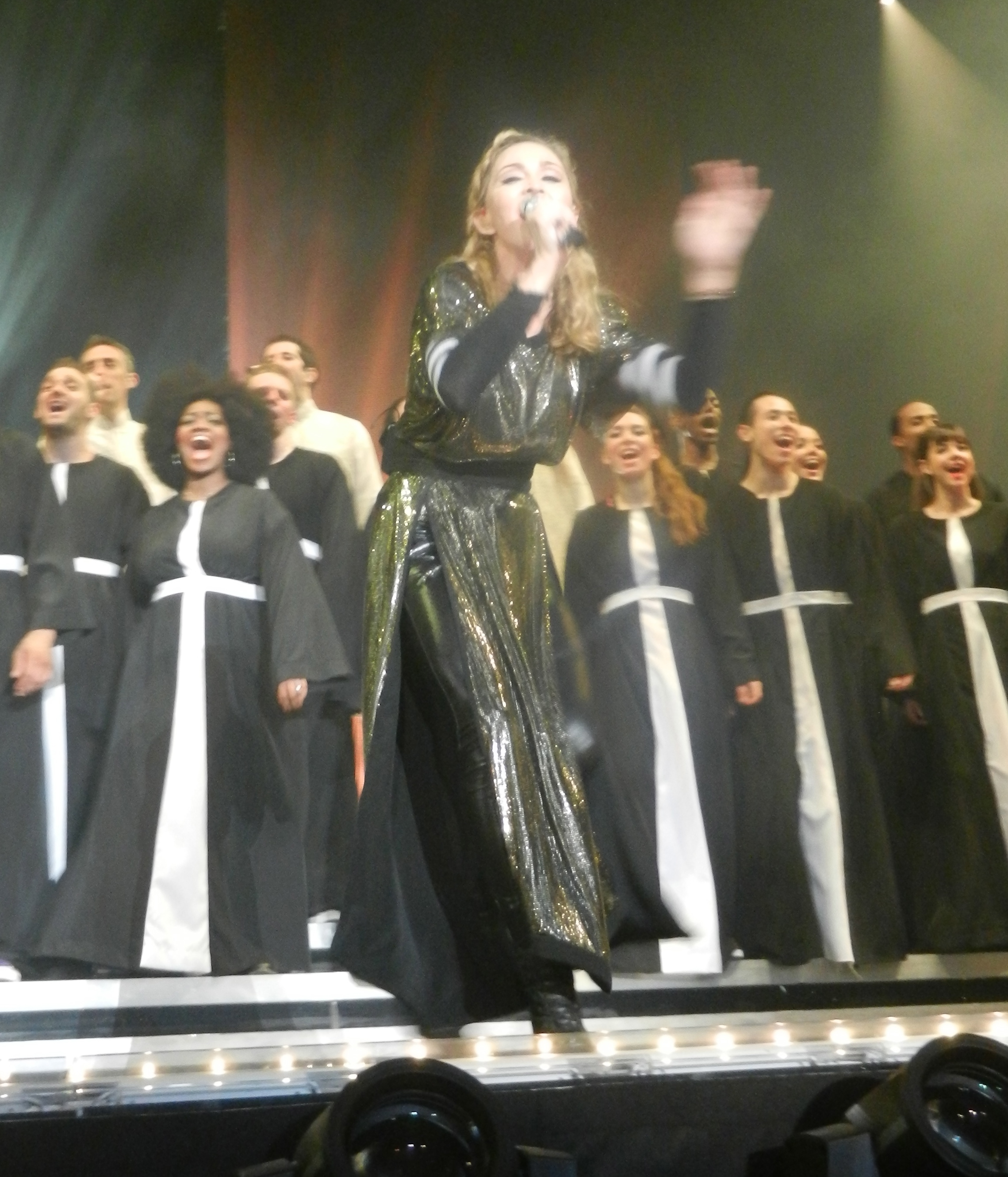
Madonna, flanked by a choir, performing "Like a Prayer" on the 2012 MDNA Tour.

The first live performance of "Like a Prayer" was on the 1990 Blond Ambition World Tour, with Madonna wearing a dress that looked like a cross between a Mediterranean widow's attire and a clergy's robe. Hundreds of burning candles surrounded her as she knelt down in front of the stage, the backup singers crying the words "Oh my God" several times. Madonna eventually removed a scarf from her head to display a huge crucifix hanging from her neck, and then rose and sang the full song, while her dancers gyrated around her. Two different performances were taped and released on video: the Blond Ambition: Japan Tour 90, taped in Yokohama, Japan, on April 27, 1990, and Blond Ambition World Tour Live, taped in Nice, France, on August 5, 1990. On his review of the latter release, Entertainment Weekly's Ty Burr praised the "gymnastic dance productions in songs such as 'Where's the Party' and 'Like a Prayer'", calling them "astonishing".

In 2003, while doing a set of short promotional performances for her ninth studio album American Life, Madonna performed an acoustic version of "Like a Prayer", with the choir portion of the song being replaced by guitar sounds. The song was also included in the set list of the Re-Invention World Tour of 2004. Members of the audience were asked to sing along with her, filling in the part of the choir. Madonna was dressed in a black Stella McCartney suit while backup vocalist Siedah Garrett sang the vocals during the intermediate verses; the backdrops displayed a series of Hebrew letters, indicating the 72 names of God. Jim Farber from New York magazine complimented Madonna's vocals during the song. The performance was included on the 2006 live album of the tour, titled I'm Going to Tell You a Secret. Madonna sang a similar version of the song during the Live 8 benefit concert at Hyde Park, London in July 2005. She performed it alongside Birhan Woldu, an Ethiopian woman who, as a malnourished toddler, had appeared in some of the footage of the 1984–85 famine in Ethiopia.

A dance version of the song, mixed with fragments of the dance track "Feels Like Home" by Meck, was performed in the 2008–09 Sticky & Sweet Tour as part of the rave segment. For the performance, Madonna appeared wearing a breastplate and a short wig. She danced energetically around the whole stage as backup singer Nicki Richards provided vocals during the intermediate solo. Screens displayed a message of equality of religions, as symbols and texts from different scriptures flashed by, including messages from the Bible, Qur'an, Torah and Talmud. Helen Brown from The Daily Telegraph declared the performance as one of the highlights of the tour, while Joey Guerra from Houston Chronicle compared Madonna rising on a platform with that of a superhero. The performance was included both in the CD and DVD of the live release of the tour, titled Sticky & Sweet Tour, filmed in Buenos Aires, Argentina from December 4–7, 2008. In January 2010, Madonna performed an acoustic version of the song live during the Hope For Haiti telethon. Jon Caramanica of The New York Times commented: "For 20 years, that song has been the symbol of one of the most tumultuous and controversial periods in Madonna's life. But for five minutes tonight, it was pure, put in service of something bigger than the singer."

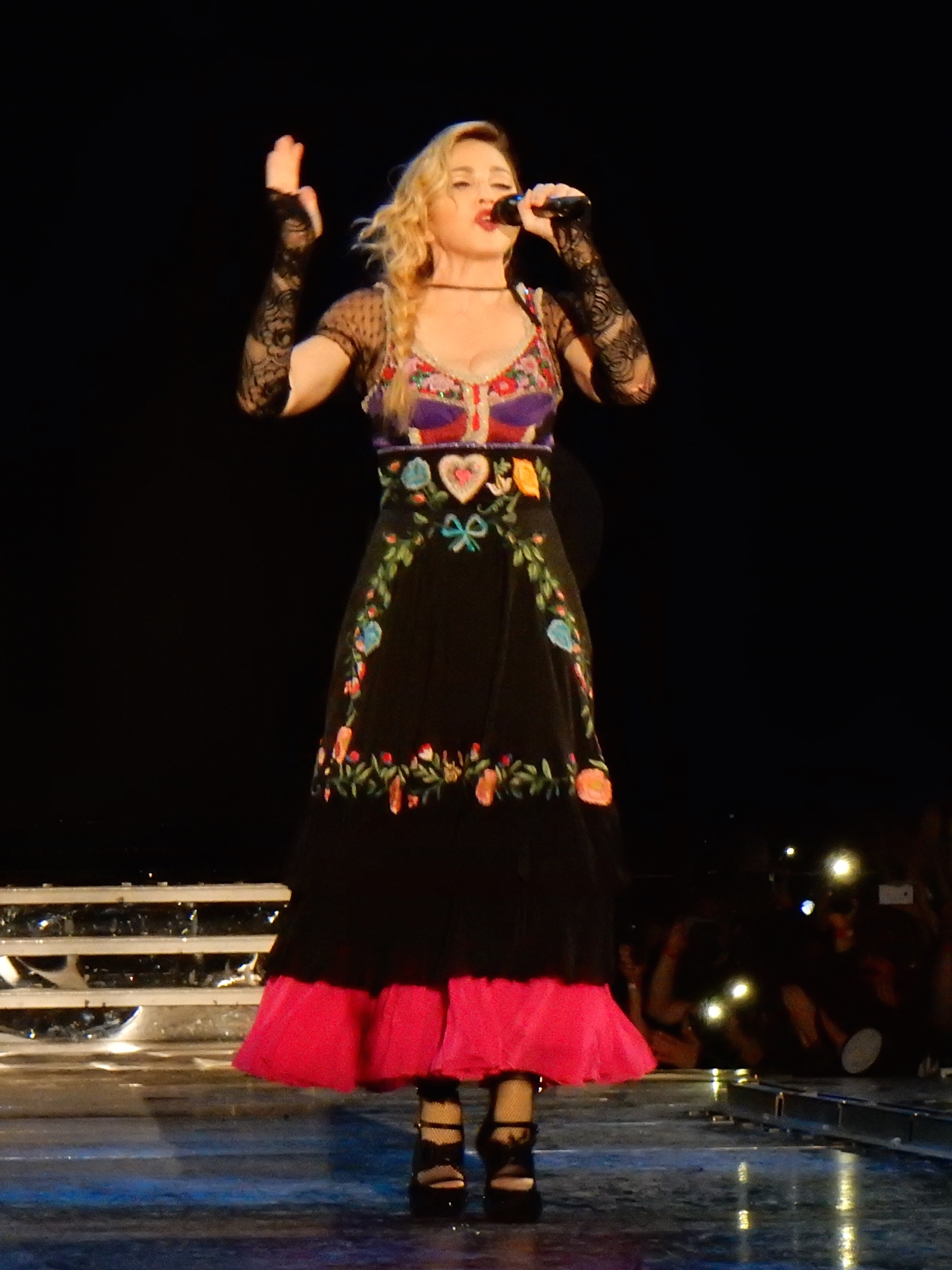
On November 14, 2015, Madonna performed "Like a Prayer" on the Stockholm stop of her Rebel Heart Tour as dedication to the victims of the Paris terrorist attacks.

The track next appeared on the set list for Madonna's Super Bowl XLVI halftime show in 2012, as the closing song. Joined by a choir and singer CeeLo Green, she wore a black robe and sang the song as the stadium was lit with white light. It was also added to the set list for the MDNA Tour the same year. Performed in an energetic gospel version, Madonna and thirty-six of her back-up singers played the role of a choir and wore long robes, as images of a gothic church and Hebrew letters appeared on the backdrops. Jim Harrington from The Oakland Tribune gave the overall concert a negative review but stated that "It wasn't until the last two songs—"Like a Prayer" and "Celebration"—that the whole deal finally clicked". Timothy Finn from The Kansas City Star was particularly impressed with the backing choir, calling it "the best use of one since Foreigner's 'I Want to Know What Love Is'". The performance of the song at the November 19–20, 2012 shows in Miami, at the American Airlines Arena, were recorded and released in Madonna's fourth live album, MDNA World Tour.

On October 27, 2015, during the Inglewood stop of her Rebel Heart Tour, Madonna sang an acoustic version of "Like a Prayer", asking the crowd to sing along with her. She also performed the song during her concert in Stockholm, Sweden, on November 14, 2015, dedicating it to the victims of the Paris terrorist attacks. The singer subsequently performed the song in other cities during the Asian and Oceanian legs of the tour; one of the performances in Sydney was included as a bonus track on Madonna's fifth live album, Rebel Heart Tour. Madonna next performed the song during an impromptu concert at Washington Square Park in November 2016, as part of Hillary Clinton's presidential campaign. On May 7, 2018, she appeared at the Met Gala and performed the song on the Metropolitan Museum of Art's grand staircase. Dressed in a cloak, she was surrounded by background singers standing as monks and church bells tolling.

In May 2019, Madonna performed "Like a Prayer" and "Future", a collaboration with rapper Quavo from her fourteenth studio album Madame X, in Tel Aviv, Israel, during the finals of the Eurovision Song Contest 2019. The singer stood atop a high, staircase stage surrounded by hooded dancers in monk-like outfits, and wore an outfit consisting of silver truss with dangling suspenders, thigh boots, a metallic corset, black cape and a black bejeweled eyepatch. It received mixed reviews, with much criticism going to the singer's voice; the Netherlands announcer Emma Wortelboer quipped she was "thankful for Madonna's autotune" during the results segment of the competition. One day later, a video of the performance was uploaded to the singer's official YouTube account, this time her vocals were edited. For the Madame X Tour, she performed it in a "simple" way, with backing from percussion and a choir. For Peter Piatkowski of PopMatters, the "stripped" nature of the arrangement highlighted the song's composition and structure. In October 2021, while promoting the Madame X documentary film, Madonna made a surprise performance in Harlem singing "Dark Ballet", "Sodade" and "La Isla Bonita" at The Red Rooster, and later walked down the streets singing "Like a Prayer" in front of the St. Andrew's Episcopal Church.

During the Celebration Tour of 2023–24, the song was mashed up with Madonna's own "Act of Contrition", and "Unholy" (2022) by Sam Smith and Kim Petras, performed atop a rotating carousel with crosses depicting a chapel, with dancers as half naked crucifixes. At the end, her son David Banda dressed as a Prince look-alike and played the guitar solo from "Act of Contrition" while the screens showed the message "I Would Die 4 U". On April 18, 2026, Madonna joined American-singer Sabrina Carpenter for a duet of the song at the main stage at Coachella 2026, 20 years after Madonna's debut at the festival.

== Cover versions and usage ==
One of the first cover versions of the song was an acoustic version done by folk singer-songwriter John Wesley Harding, for his 1989 extended play, God Made Me Do It: The Christmas EP. The 1999 and 2000 compilation albums, Virgin Voices: A Tribute To Madonna, Vol. 1 and Vol. 2, included a cover of the track by singer Loleatta Holloway and electro-industrial band Bigod 20, respectively. Another version was recorded in 2002 by Hi-NRG/Eurodance group Mad'House, and was included in their album Absolutely Mad. It was released as a single and was a commercial success, reaching the top of the charts in Austria, Germany, Ireland and the Netherlands, the top ten in Belgium (Flanders and Wallonia regions), France, Switzerland and the United Kingdom, and the top twenty in Denmark and Sweden. On the Billboard European Hot 100 Singles chart, it reached a peak of number two. A folk music cover of the song by Lavender Diamond was included on the 2007 Madonna tribute compilation Through the Wilderness.

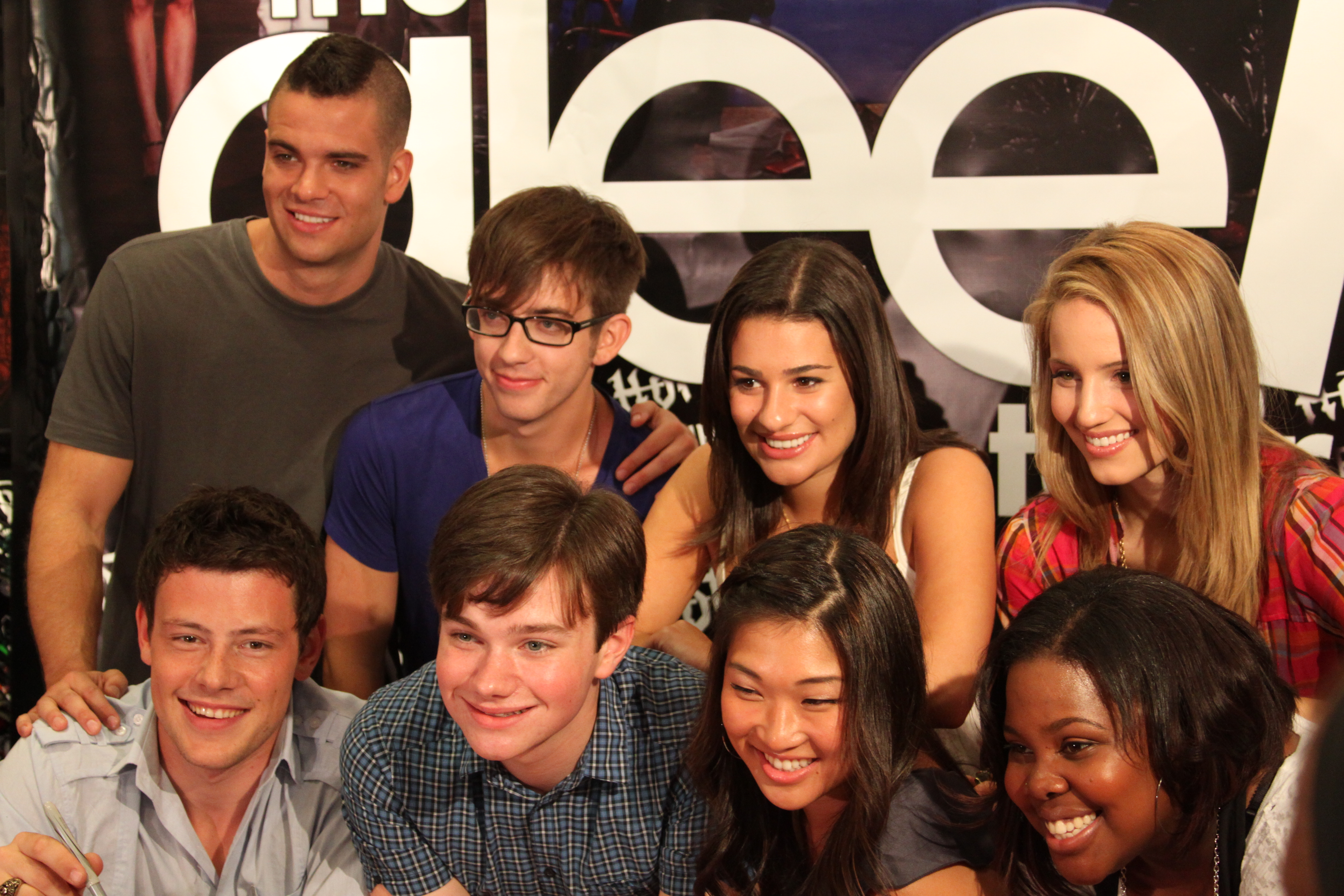
Members of the Glee cast covered the song in 2010, during an episode themed around Madonna, "The Power of Madonna".

"Like a Prayer" was featured in an episode of American television series, Glee, called "The Power of Madonna". It was sung at the end of the episode by the fictional choir New Directions, performed by the Glee cast members. The song was released as digital download to the iTunes Store, and was also included on the soundtrack EP, Glee: The Music, The Power of Madonna. The cover version reached number 28 in Australia, number 27 in Canada, number two in Ireland, and number 16 in the United Kingdom. In the United States, the song reached number 27 on the Billboard Hot 100, while debuting and peaking on the Hot Digital Songs chart at number ten, with sales of 87,000 copies.

DJs Meck and Dino created a mashup of the former's 2007 single, "Feels Like Home", with "Like a Prayer" and released it with the name as "Feels Like a Prayer". The song reached the top ten in Belgium (Flanders region) and the Netherlands, while peaking at number 15 in Belgium (Walloon region). In the United States, "Feels Like a Prayer" reached number seven on the Hot Dance Club Songs chart. We Are the Fallen, an American gothic metal band, covered "Like a Prayer" live in 2008. Nick Duerden from Spin complimented the performance and the track for being "so successfully pulverized that one wondered whether it wasn't written specifically to become the world's greatest heavy rock anthem." In June 2017, Leonard released a piano ballad version of the track, with vocals from singer Dana Williams. In the same month, Brazilian singer Luiza Possi covered "Like a Prayer" during the show Domingão do Faustão, in a similar performance to that of Blond Ambition World Tour. She later sang it during the encore of a show in tribute to Michael Jackson, which took place in July.

In 2021, Miley Cyrus covered the song for her Peacock television special Miley Cyrus Presents Stand by You. In 2022, she performed it again during the Bud Light Super Bowl Music Fest in Los Angeles. The performance was released on her 2022 live album, Attention: Miley Live.

According to Screen Rant, "Like a Prayer" is one of the most used Madonna's songs in movies and television. "Like a Prayer" is featured in the film Deadpool & Wolverine (2024). Stars Ryan Reynolds and Hugh Jackman, along with director Shawn Levy, received Madonna's permission to use the song, who also offered notes on the scene where it would be used. A digital EP titled Deadpool & Wolverine: Madonna's "Like a Prayer" EP, featuring the soundtrack versions of the song was released on August 9, 2024, two weeks after the release of the film. Wrestler Graeme Stevely, known for his in-ring name Grado, has used the song as his entrance music in Insane Championship Wrestling. On the evening of August 10, 2024, Abi Carter sang the song at Honda Center as part of the Disney Experiences Showcase during Disney's D23 fan event. She was joined onstage by Deadpool.

Josh Fawaz released a cover of "Like a Prayer" that heavily utilised artificial intelligence (AI), it was released as part of his album titled Dance Like Nobody's Watching. It reached number one on the Australian radio charts during July 2026 and reached number one on the ARIA Charts and Billboard charts, it also reached number one on the Official Independent Singles Breakers in the United Kingdom. After the song's release, an AI disclosure label was added following criticism.

== Legacy and cultural impact ==
"'Like a Prayer' is a very important song to me. I felt the impact that it was going to make. That song means a lot more to me than 'Like a Virgin'. I wrote it and it's from my heart. It's a very spiritual song. I think I was much more spiritually in touch with the power of words and music by the time I started recording the song and the album."

— Madonna speaking of "Like a Prayer"'s importance.

"Like a Prayer" is considered to be one of the best songs of Madonna's career. In addition to ranking it Madonna's best single, Matthew Jacobs of HuffPost declared it "among the best pop songs of all time". It was ranked sixth on Blender magazine's list of "The 500 Greatest Songs Since You Were Born", while in 2004 Rolling Stone included it in their list of The 500 Greatest Songs of All Time, at number 300. When the magazine updated the list in 2010, the song dropped to number 306, but in 2021, Rolling Stone moved the song up to number 55. For NME's "The Greatest Pop Songs In History" list in 2011, the track was placed at number three. Priya Elan from the publication noted it as Madonna's "calling card", bestowing the singer with a "legendary" status. In 2003, Madonna fans were asked to vote for their "Top 20 Madonna singles of all-time", by Q magazine. "Like a Prayer" was allocated the number one spot on the list. It was also listed by both The Guardian and Entertainment Weekly as Madonna's greatest single. Rolling Stone and Billboard also ranked the song number one in their lists of the greatest Madonna songs. In 2014, LA Weekly placed the song at rank two on their list of "The 20 Best Pop Songs in History By Female Artists". Art Tavana from the publication opined that "'Like a Prayer' was the moment when Madonna went from being the voice of America's teenagers to the worldwide high priestess of pop." In their ranking of the best songs from the 1980s, Pitchfork listed "Like a Prayer" at number 50. In 2023, celebrating the 65th anniversary of Billboard Hot 100, the staff of the magazine ranked "Like a Prayer" as the sixth best pop song that appeared in the chart since 1958.

Campbell noted that the popularity and the media mayhem around the song and the video, helped introduce the concept of free publicity. "Like a Prayer"'s impact was more evident on its parent studio album, which shot to the top of the charts once it was released in April 1989. The author further argued that the controversial clip was evidence of the emergence of the "video commodity as a different entity from the song that spawned it". As author Judith Marcus explained in her book, Surviving the Twentieth Century, Madonna used the church to make her own point on victimization. For Marcus the main impact lay in the fact that the clip ultimately portrayed an empowerment message, questioning and "attacking" the Church's male prejudice and continuous female subjugation throughout history.

The song was noted by Campbell for the mix of choir and organ, which according to him paved the way for gospel music to be more mainstream than before. In 1999, the University of Michigan School of Music, Theatre & Dance held a seminar on the different implications and metaphors present in the song; it was headed by professors Martin Katz, George Shirley and Michael Daugherty. The main topic discussed was the fact that there can be different metaphorical meanings of the song, as the word "like" can be taken in separate contexts.

Taraborrelli commented that "in the end, the events surrounding 'Like a Prayer' only served to enhance Madonna's reputation as a shrewd businesswoman, someone who knows how to sell a concept." Before Madonna's deal with Pepsi, pop stars in general were not given much artistic freedom by sponsors. However, Madonna made it a point to have the commercial be dictated by her. While she said that it was never her intention for Pepsi to get entangled in the controversy of the music video, Taraborrelli also observed that Madonna stayed true to herself. Although the commercial intended to promote Pepsi the soft drink, she did not bother to hold even a can of the product, leading the author to comment that "Madonna the pop star was going to do it her way, no matter what Madonna the businesswoman had agreed to do". She maintained all along that the Pepsi commercial and the music video were two different commodities and she was right to stand her ground.

== Track listing and formats ==
- US and Canada 7" single and US 3-inch CD single
1. "Like a Prayer" (7" Version) – 5:19
2. "Act of Contrition" (LP Version) – 2:19
- US 12-inch vinyl single
1. A1. "Like a Prayer" (12" Dance Mix) – 7:50
2. A2. "Like a Prayer" (12" Extended Remix) – 7:21
3. A3. "Like a Prayer" (Churchapella) – 6:14
4. B1. "Like a Prayer" (12" Club Version) – 6:35
5. B2. "Like a Prayer" (7" Remix/Edit) – 5:41
6. B3. "Act of Contrition" (LP Version) – 2:19
- 1989 UK 12-inch vinyl single, 1995 re-issue CD maxi-single
1. A. "Like a Prayer" (12" Dance Mix) – 7:50
2. B1. "Like a Prayer" (Churchapella) – 6:14
3. B2. "Like a Prayer" (7" Remix/Edit) – 5:41
- 3-inch CD single (Japan)
1. "Like a Prayer" (7" Version) – 5:19
2. "Act of Contrition" (LP Version) – 2:19
- 2021 digital single
1. "Like a Prayer" (12" Dance Mix) – 7:52
2. "Like a Prayer" (12" Extended Remix) – 7:24
3. "Like a Prayer" (Churchapella) – 6:08
4. "Like a Prayer" (12" Club Version) – 6:38
5. "Like a Prayer" (7" Remix/Edit) – 5:44
6. "Act of Contrition" (LP Version) – 2:19
7. "Like a Prayer" (7" Version) – 5:19
8. "Like a Prayer" (Instra Dub) – 6:13
9. "Like a Prayer" (Bass Dub) – 5:49
10. "Like a Prayer" (Dub Beats) – 4:43
- 2024 Deadpool & Wolverine EP
1. "Like a Prayer" – 5:40
2. "Like a Prayer" (Battle Royale Mix) – 2:48
3. "Like a Prayer" (Choir Version) – 2:32

== Personnel ==
Personnel are adapted from the Like a Prayer album liner notes.

- Madonna – lyricist, producer, lead vocals, background vocals
- Patrick Leonard – composer, producer, arranger
- The Andraé Crouch Choir – background vocals
- Bill Meyers – arranger
- Bruce Gaitsch – acoustic guitar
- Chester Kamen – guitar
- Chuck Findley – arranger, brass
- Dann Huff – guitar
- David Williams – guitar
- Dick Hyde – brass
- Donna De Lory – background vocals
- Jean Johnson (singer) – background vocals
- Geary Lanier Faggett – clavinet
- Guy Pratt – bass, drum programming
- Jonathan Moffett – drums
- Paulinho da Costa – percussion
- Herb Ritts – cover art photographer
- Jeri Heiden – 7" single cover designer
- Diane Painter – 7" single cover artwork (hand-tinting)
- Christopher Ciccone – 12" single cover designer
- Bob Ludwig – mastering
- Bill Bottrell – mixing
- Shep Pettibone – additional producer, remix, audio engineering
- Michael Hutchinson – remix engineer
- Dave Way – assistant engineer
- Fred McFarlane – programming
- Junior Vasquez – audio engineering
- Bill Bottrell – additional producer, remix
- Prince – guitar, uncredited

== Charts ==
=== Weekly charts ===
Chart (1989)	Peak position
Australia (ARIA)	1
Austria (Ö3 Austria Top 40)	2
Belgium (Ultratop 50 Flanders)	1
Brazil (Nopem/ABPD)	1
Canada Top Singles (RPM)	1
Canada Retail Singles (The Record)	1
Canada Dance/Urban (RPM)	2
Denmark (IFPI)	1
Europe (Eurochart Hot 100)	1
Finland (Suomen virallinen lista)	1
France (SNEP)	2
Greece (IFPI)	2
Iceland (Íslenski Listinn Topp 10)	1
Ireland (IRMA)	1
Italy (Musica e dischi)	1
Italy Airplay (Music & Media)	1
Japan (Oricon)	30
Mexico (AMPROFON)	1
Netherlands (Dutch Top 40)	2
Netherlands (Single Top 100)	1
New Zealand (Recorded Music NZ)	1
Norway (VG-lista)	1
Panama (UPI)	3
Portugal (AFP)	1
Spain (AFYVE)	1
Sweden (Sverigetopplistan)	1
Switzerland (Schweizer Hitparade)	1
UK Singles (Official Charts)	1
Uruguay (UPI)	1
US Billboard Hot 100	1
US Adult Contemporary (Billboard)	3
US Dance Club Songs (Billboard)	1
US Dance Singles Sales (Billboard)	1
US Hot R&B/Hip-Hop Songs (Billboard)	20
US Cash Box Top 100	1
US Dance Tracks (Dance Music Report)	1
Venezuela (UPI)	5
West Germany (GfK)	2

Chart (2019)	Peak position
Poland Airplay (ZPAV)	64

Chart (2024)	Peak position
Canada Digital Song Sales (Billboard)	16
Czech Republic Singles Digital (ČNS IFPI)	70
Global 200 (Billboard)	140
Ireland (IRMA)	41
Slovakia Singles Digital (ČNS IFPI)	75
UK Singles (OCC)	27

Chart (2026)	Peak position
Austria Airplay (IFPI)	48
Greece International (IFPI)	85
Ireland (IRMA)	36

=== Year-end charts ===
Chart (1989)	Position
Australia (ARIA)	1
Austria (Ö3 Austria Top 40)	7
Belgium (Ultratop 50 Flanders)	12
Brazil (Brazilian Radio Airplay)	38
Canada Top Singles (RPM)	1
Canada Dance/Urban (RPM)	24
Europe (Eurochart Hot 100)	2
France (SNEP)	4
Netherlands (Dutch Top 40)	13
Netherlands (Single Top 100)	7
New Zealand (RIANZ)	8
Norway Spring Period (VG-lista)	2
Norway Winter Period (VG-lista)	9
Portugal (AFP)	1
Spain (AFYVE)	4
Sweden (Topplistan)	1
Switzerland (Schweizer Hitparade)	6
UK Singles (OCC)	11
US Billboard Hot 100	25
US 12-inch Singles Sales (Billboard)	6
US Adult Contemporary (Billboard)	40
US Dance Club Play (Billboard)	30
US Cash Box Top 100	1
West Germany (Media Control)	6

=== Decade-end charts ===
Chart (1980–1989)	Rank position
Australia (Kent Music Report)	48

== Certifications and sales ==
Region	Certification	Certified units/sales
Australia (ARIA)	Platinum	70,000^{^}
Denmark (IFPI Danmark)	Platinum	90,000^{‡}
France (SNEP)	Silver	400,000
Germany (BVMI)	Platinum	600,000^{‡}
Italy (FIMI) since 2009	Gold	25,000^{‡}
Japan	—	31,810
New Zealand (RMNZ)	2× Platinum	60,000^{‡}
Spain (Promusicae)	Gold	30,000^{‡}
Sweden (GLF)	Platinum	50,000^{^}
Switzerland (IFPI Switzerland)	Gold	25,000^{^}
United Kingdom (BPI)	3× Platinum	1,800,000^{‡}
United States (RIAA)	2× Platinum	2,000,000
Streaming
Greece (IFPI Greece)	Gold	1,000,000^{†}
^{^} Shipments figures based on certification alone.^{‡} Sales+streaming figures based on certification alone.^{†} Streaming-only figures based on certification alone.

== Release history ==
Region	Date	Label(s)	Format(s)	Cat. No.	Ref.
United Kingdom	March 6, 1989	Sire	7-inch; 12-inch; CD	W 7539; W 7539T; W 7539CD	
United Kingdom	April 3, 1989	Sire	Cassette	W 7539C	

== See also ==
- List of number-one singles of the 1980s (Australia)
- List of number-one singles of 1989 (Canada)
- List of number-one singles of 1989 (Europe)
- List of number-one singles of 1989 (Ireland)
- List of number-one singles in 1989 (New Zealand)
- List of number-one songs in Norway
- List of number-one singles and albums in Sweden
- List of number-one singles of the 1980s (Switzerland)
- List of number-one singles of the 1980s (UK)
- List of Billboard Hot 100 number-one singles of 1989 (U.S.)
- List of Billboard number-one dance singles of 1989 (U.S.)
- List of Cash Box Top 100 number-one singles of 1989
- List of number-one hits of 2002 (Austria)
- List of number-one hits of 2002 (Germany)
- List of number-one singles of 2002 (Ireland)
- List of number-one singles of 2002 (Netherlands)

== Bibliography ==
- Allen, Robert Clyde; Hill, Annette (2004). The Television Studies Reader. Psychology Press. ISBN 978-0-415-28323-6.
- Bignell, James (2007). Postmodern Media Culture. Aakar Books. ISBN 978-81-89833-16-9.
- Bego, Mark (2000). Madonna: Blonde Ambition. Cooper Square Press. ISBN 978-0-8154-1051-5.
- Bronson, Fred (2003). The Billboard Book of Number 1 Hits. Billboard books. ISBN 978-0-8230-7677-2.
- Campbell, Michael (2008). Popular Music in America: And the Beat Goes On. Cengage Learning. ISBN 978-0-495-50530-3.
- Creswell, Toby (2006). 1001 Songs: The Great Songs of All Time and the Artists, Stories and Secrets Behind Them. Thunder's Mouth Press. ISBN 978-1-56025-915-2.
- Cross, Mary (2007). Madonna: A Biography. Greenwood Publishing Group. ISBN 978-0-313-33811-3.
- Dean, Maury (2003). Rock 'n' Roll Gold Rush: A Singles Un-Cyclopedia. Algora Publishing. ISBN 978-0-87586-207-1.
- Dirks, Nicholas B.; Eley, Geoff; Ortner, Sherry B. (1994). Culture/power/history: a reader in contemporary social theory. Princeton University Press. ISBN 978-0-691-02102-7.
- Dunn, Leslie C.; Jones, Nancy A. (1996). Embodied Voices: Representing Female Vocality in Western Culture. Cambridge University Press. ISBN 978-0-521-58583-5.
- Epstein, Heidi (2004). Melting the Venusberg: A Feminist Theology of Music. Continuum International Publishing Group. ISBN 978-0-8264-1648-3.
- Fouz-Hernández, Santiago; Jarman-Ivens, Freya (2004). Madonna's Drowned Worlds. Ashgate Publishing, Ltd. ISBN 978-0-7546-3372-3.
- Grant, Robert McQueen; Neupert, Kent E. (2003). Cases in contemporary strategy analysis. Wiley-Blackwell. ISBN 978-1-4051-1180-5.
- Guilbert, Georges-Claude (2002). Madonna as Postmodern Myth: How One Star's Self-Construction Rewrites Sex, Gender, Hollywood and the American Dream. McFarland. ISBN 978-0-7864-1408-6.
- Marcus, Judith (1999). Surviving the Twentieth Century. Transaction Publishers. ISBN 978-1-56000-352-6.
- Metz, Allen; Benson, Carol (1999). The Madonna Companion: Two Decades of Commentary. Music Sales Group. ISBN 978-0-8256-7194-4.
- Mitchell, Claudia; Reid-Walsh, Jacqueline (2007). Girl Culture: An Encyclopedia [2 Volumes]: An Encyclopedia. Greenwood Publishing Group. ISBN 978-0-313-08444-7.
- Nyman, Jake (2005). Suomi soi 4: Suuri suomalainen listakirja [Finland list of Songs and chartings] (in Finnish). Helsinki: Tammi. ISBN 978-951-31-2503-5.
- O'Brien, Lucy (2007). Madonna: Like an Icon. Bantam Press. ISBN 978-0-593-05547-2.
- Rooksby, Rikky (2004). The Complete Guide to the Music of Madonna. Omnibus Press. ISBN 978-0-7119-9883-4.
- Rosen, Craig (1996). The Billboard Book of Number One Albums: The Inside Story Behind Pop Music's Blockbuster Records. Billboard books. ISBN 978-0-8230-7586-7.
- Salaverri, Fernando (2005). Sólo éxitos: año a año, 1959–2002. Spain: Fundación Autor-SGAE. ISBN 978-84-8048-639-2.
- Shewey, Don; Ganz, Caryn (1997). Madonna, the Rolling Stone Files: The Ultimate Compendium of Interviews, Articles, Facts, and Opinions from the Files of Rolling Stone. Hyperion Books. ISBN 978-0-7868-8154-3.
- Taraborrelli, Randy J. (2002). Madonna: An Intimate Biography. Simon & Schuster. ISBN 978-1-4165-8346-2.
