= List of Canadian number-one albums of 1989 =

These are the Canadian number-one albums of 1989. The chart is compiled by Nielsen Soundscan and published by Jam! Canoe, issued every Sunday. The chart also appears in Billboard magazine as Top Canadian Albums.

Issue date	Album	Artist
January 7	Rattle and Hum	U2
January 14	Rattle and Hum	U2
January 21	Rattle and Hum	U2
January 28	Traveling Wilburys Vol. 1	Traveling Wilburys
February 4	Traveling Wilburys Vol. 1	Traveling Wilburys
February 11	Traveling Wilburys Vol. 1	Traveling Wilburys
February 18	Traveling Wilburys Vol. 1	Traveling Wilburys
February 25	Traveling Wilburys Vol. 1	Traveling Wilburys
March 4	Traveling Wilburys Vol. 1	Traveling Wilburys
March 11	Traveling Wilburys Vol. 1	Traveling Wilburys
March 18	Traveling Wilburys Vol. 1	Traveling Wilburys
March 25	Mystery Girl	Roy Orbison
April 1	Mystery Girl	Roy Orbison
April 8	Mystery Girl	Roy Orbison
April 15	Traveling Wilburys Vol. 1	Traveling Wilburys
April 22	Like a Prayer	Madonna
April 29	Like a Prayer	Madonna
May 6	Like a Prayer	Madonna
May 13	Like a Prayer	Madonna
May 20	Like a Prayer	Madonna
May 27	Like a Prayer	Madonna
June 3	The Raw & the Cooked	Fine Young Cannibals
June 10	The Raw & the Cooked	Fine Young Cannibals
June 17	The Raw & the Cooked	Fine Young Cannibals
June 24	The Raw & the Cooked	Fine Young Cannibals
July 1	The Raw & the Cooked	Fine Young Cannibals
July 8	The Raw & the Cooked	Fine Young Cannibals
July 15	The Raw & the Cooked	Fine Young Cannibals
July 22	The Raw & the Cooked	Fine Young Cannibals
July 29	The Raw & the Cooked	Fine Young Cannibals
August 5	The Raw & the Cooked	Fine Young Cannibals
August 12	The Raw & the Cooked	Fine Young Cannibals
August 19	The Raw & the Cooked	Fine Young Cannibals
August 26	Batman (soundtrack)	Prince
September 2	The Raw & the Cooked	Fine Young Cannibals
September 9	The Raw & the Cooked	Fine Young Cannibals
September 16	The Raw & the Cooked	Fine Young Cannibals
September 23	The Raw & the Cooked	Fine Young Cannibals
September 30	Steel Wheels	The Rolling Stones
October 7	Steel Wheels	The Rolling Stones
October 14	Steel Wheels	The Rolling Stones
October 21	Steel Wheels	The Rolling Stones
October 28	Girl You Know It's True	Milli Vanilli
November 4	Girl You Know It's True	Milli Vanilli
November 11	Girl You Know It's True	Milli Vanilli
November 18	Girl You Know It's True	Milli Vanilli
November 25	Girl You Know It's True	Milli Vanilli
December 2	Girl You Know It's True	Milli Vanilli
December 9	Girl You Know It's True	Milli Vanilli
December 16	Girl You Know It's True	Milli Vanilli
December 23	...But Seriously	Phil Collins

== See also ==
- List of Canadian number-one singles of 1989
