= Cherish (Madonna song) =

1989 single by Madonna

Single by Madonna

from the album Like a Prayer
- B-side: "Supernatural"
- Released: August 1, 1989
- Recorded: 1989
- Studio: Johnny Yuma Recording (Burbank, CA); Saturn Sound Studios (Sherman Oaks, CA); Ocean Way Recording (Hollywood, CA)
- Genre: Pop; doo-wop
- Length: 5:03
- Label: Sire; Warner Bros.
- Songwriters: Madonna; Patrick Leonard
- Producers: Madonna; Patrick Leonard

Madonna singles chronology
| "Express Yourself" (1989) | "Cherish" (1989) | "Oh Father" (1989) |

Music video
- "Cherish" on YouTube

"Cherish" is a song by American singer Madonna from her fourth studio album, Like a Prayer (1989). It was written and produced by Madonna and Patrick Leonard, and was released by Sire Records as the album's third single on August 1, 1989. "Cherish" was built around the themes of love and relationships, with William Shakespeare's Romeo and Juliet being one of the major inspirations. The track also included a line from "Cherish" by the 1960s band the Association. Musically constructed as a doo-wop-style pop song, it is regarded as a light-hearted track by critics and includes instruments such as a drum machine, percussions, keyboards and a saxophone. Lyrically, it speaks of Madonna's devotion to her lover, and her promise to be always by his side. "Cherish" was included on Madonna's greatest hits compilations The Immaculate Collection (1990) and Celebration (2009).

After its release, the song received positive feedback from reviewers, who were surprised by the change of content and the lighter image of Madonna's music in contrast to her previous singles from Like a Prayer, which incorporated themes such as religion and sexuality. They compared certain lyrics of the song to Juliet's lines in Romeo and Juliet. "Cherish" was a commercial success, topping the Canadian music chart and reaching the top ten of the charts in Australia, Belgium, Italy, Ireland, the United Kingdom and the combined European chart. In the United States, "Cherish" peaked at number two on the Billboard Hot 100, giving Madonna the record for the most consecutive top-five singles by any act with 16.

A black-and-white music video for the song was directed by photographer Herb Ritts at the Paradise Cove Beach in Malibu, California. In the video, Madonna plays herself, while three co-actors dressed as mermen swim in and out of the sea. Academics noted that the mermen became symbols for the homosexual community and the oppression it faced. Madonna performed "Cherish" on her Blond Ambition World Tour (1990), where the performance included her dancers dressed up as mermen.

== Background ==
"Cherish" was written and produced by Madonna and Patrick Leonard, and released as the third single from Like a Prayer (1989). The song is built around the themes of love and relationships, with William Shakespeare's Romeo and Juliet one of its major inspirations. Madonna was reading Romeo and Juliet during the breaks during rehearsals for Speed the Plow, a Broadway show in which she was starring in 1988. On the third day of the Like a Prayer recording sessions, she presented Leonard with the lyrics of "Cherish", and explained that she had written the song "one sunny afternoon by the beach", but later confessed that it was actually written in her make-up room. "I wrote it in a superhyper-positive state of mind that I knew was not going to last", the singer recalled. Leonard introduced one line from the similar titled song by the 1960s band the Association, "Cherish is the word I use", after which Madonna decided to include it on Like a Prayer. The B-side of the single release of "Cherish" was a previously unreleased track called "Supernatural", initially composed during the recording sessions of her third studio album, True Blue and later completed in 1989. In 2009, during an interview with Rolling Stone, Madonna confessed that she had never been able to predict if her songs would be successful, irrespective of her personal opinion of them. As an example, she cited "Cherish" as one of the most "retarded" songs she had written, but noted it became a commercial success. The song was also included on the 1990 compilation album The Immaculate Collection and the two-disc edition of her 2009 compilation Celebration.

== Composition ==
"Cherish"
A 30 second sample of "Cherish", which starts with the opening verse of the song, played on synths with keyboards accompanying it. As Madonna sings the verses, the sound of drum machines, percussion and guitars back her voice.

"Cherish" is a doo-wop style pop shuffle song and opened the second side of Like a Prayer. It begins with the sound of synths and keyboard and Madonna repeatedly singing the words "cherish, cherish". This is followed by the sound from drum machine, as percussion and guitars accompany her voice. During the bridge, Madonna sings the line "Cupid please take your aim at me", as the keyboard sound becomes pronounced. The drum changes its rhythm and Madonna moves into the chorus, "Cherish the joy/of always having you here by my side", accompanied by background vocals and a bass guitar. The second verse continues in the same way, with Madonna singing the line "Romeo and Juliet/they never felt this way I bet/So don't underestimate my point of view."

As the second chorus ends, a saxophone starts playing as Madonna softly asks the listener, "Who? You! Can't get away, I won't let you", followed by Leonard's Association-inspired line. Background vocals continue repeating words over a horn, playing in B♭ minor. The drums and the percussion start again and the chorus is sung twice, before fading out. According to the sheet music published by Alfred Publishing Co. Inc., "Cherish" is composed in the time signature of common time, with a moderately fast tempo of 130 beats per minute. Set in the key of D major, "Cherish" has Madonna singing between the tonal nodes of A_{3} to D_{5}. The song follows the sequence of G/D–D–Em_{7}–D in the beginning as its chord progression, which changes to D–Dm–C–Em_{7} during the verses and shifts to G–D/G–A–D/F♯ in the chorus.

The lyrics of "Cherish" makes it a simple love song, where Madonna talks about devotion and having her lover by her side, whom she would never leave. According to semiotician Thomas Sebeok, the backbone of "Cherish" is constructed by incorporating titles of previous romantic pop hits. Songs such as "Cupid" (Sam Cooke), "You Are My Destiny" (Paul Anka) and "I Can't Let Go" (The Hollies) are used within the first verse, while other verses use the words of such song titles as "Burning Love" (Elvis Presley) and "Two Hearts" (Bruce Springsteen). Other instances include the Association song reference and Shakespeare's Romeo and Juliet. Richard Burt, author of Shakespeare After Mass Media, deduced that the lines on Romeo and Juliet and "I Can't Let Go" makes the speaker alternate between assertiveness and dependency. Sal Cinquemani from Slant Magazine felt that although "Cherish" was a "radiant" song invoking the pop music of the 60s, "in the grand pop scheme, [it] pales only in comparison to their glorious counterparts, making Like a Prayer one of the quintessential pop albums of all time."

== Critical reception ==
"'Cherish' was a particular triumph for the Madonna/Patrick Leonard partnership. A delightful confection of radio-ready proportions, the song had it all—strong, positive, remarkably dysfunction-free lyrics about love, a memorable, singalong vocal melody, and a tight, pungent rhythm arrangement. It remains, quite simply, one of the best songs Madonna has ever written; sweet and happy, but by no means corny, it's a perfectly constructed pop song which Madonna delivered beautifully, and with undeniably sassy charm."

— Biographer J. Randy Taraborrelli reviewing "Cherish" in his book, Madonna: An Intimate Biography

Wayne Robins from Newsday believed that "Cherish" exemplified the "kind of random pop we'd get if [postmodern author] William Burroughs were the program director of a Top 40 radio station." Burt compared the song and Madonna's delivery of the lyrics with the dialogues spoken by Shakespeare's Juliet, and found similarity in the, "Sweet so would I, Yet I should kill thee with much cherishing" from the play, with the lyrics of "Cherish". Allen Metz, one of the authors of The Madonna Companion, felt that "Cherish" as the opening song of the B-side of Like a Prayer, reaffirmed the sweet and happy romanticism that was missing from the A-side of the album adding, "As much a child of pop as of the church, Madonna is restored by music's healing power, in this case with a mixture of classic sweet soul and L.A. pop moderne."

Music critic J. D. Considine, while reviewing the Like a Prayer album for Rolling Stone complimented the song for creating an effective balance, contrasting its lighthearted nature with the trauma of "Oh Father", the next song. Considine also found retro-rock references in the song. Freya Jarman-Ivens, one of the authors of Madonna's Drowned Worlds, felt that the song was one of the last works on pure romanticism by Madonna. "She should come back to the formula from time to time, but I guess she has moved beyond all of that", Jarman-Ivens added. Carol Clerk, author of Madonnastyle noted that the "refreshing" nature of the song was particularly noticeable if one follows Madonna's catalog chronologically, especially embedded between the anthem like nature of the previous release, "Express Yourself", and the lament of the succeeding release, "Oh Father".

Scholar Maria Raha wrote in her book Cinderella's Big Score: Women of the Punk and Indie Underground that the song was full of "trite" lyrics. Andy Goldberg from The Jerusalem Post said that "Cherish" took "Madonna back to her old stomping grounds, the lively bass line and lilting melodies of hit albums past." Kevin Phinney from Austin American-Statesman was surprised by Madonna's contribution to the song and confessed that he "[found] it difficult to be believe that she even wrote this?" Phinney continued that he wanted Madonna to go in a more mature direction and compose songs musically similar to "Cherish". Writing for The Washington Post, Richard Harrington explained that "while songs on Like a Prayer dealt with matters opening her heart, with 'Cherish' Madonna dealt with matters which were close to her heart." This view was also shared by Ian Blair from Chicago Tribune who categorized the song as being sung for the "happy-go-lucky lovers and dreamers".

The Dallas Morning News' Lennox Samuels appreciated the light-hearted theme of the song and complimented Madonna and Leonard for not sticking with personal subject matters only on the album. Dale Anderson from The Buffalo News opined that the song would become one of Madonna's most forgettable releases, but was also hopeful that it would not. This opinion was shared by Don McLeese of the Chicago Sun-Times, who added that "Cherish" was not something expected from Madonna at that point of time. McCleese was disappointed that Madonna went back to the "happy-go-lucky, lovey-dovey" kind of songs, which did not match her self-image. Dan DeLuca from The Philadelphia Inquirer, while reviewing Madonna's Drowned World Tour in 2001, compared "Cherish" with songs by Chris Robinson, humorously adding that "only if he was gay he would sing something like that." Lucy O'Brien, author of Madonna: Like an Icon, felt that the song was typical of Madonna's previous musical endeavors, and would have been more suitable for her third studio album, True Blue, whose songs mainly dealt with romance and relationships.

== Chart performance ==
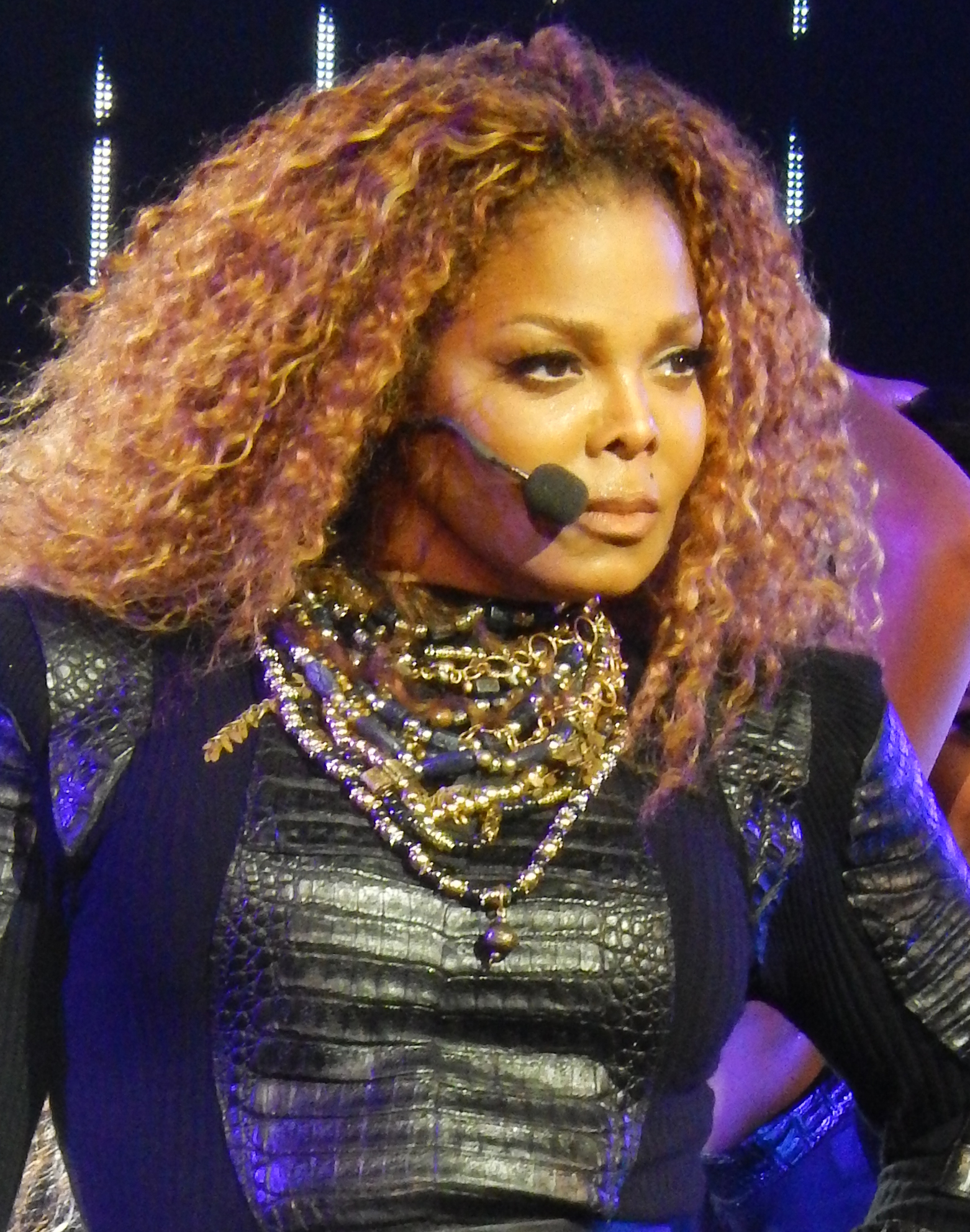
"Cherish" was barred from the number one position on the US Billboard Hot 100 by Janet Jackson's (pictured) "Miss You Much".

In the United States, "Cherish" debuted at number 37 on the Billboard Hot 100 singles chart. The next week it moved to number 28 on the chart, becoming the week's "greatest gainer" song. After three weeks, as "Cherish" entered the top-five of Billboard Hot 100, music industry prognosticators theorized that the song would become Madonna's eighth number-one song on the Hot 100. However, the song started facing competition from fellow singer Janet Jackson's single "Miss You Much", which also moved into the top-ten the same week. The popular media pitted the two women against each other and tried to create rivalry between them. The song eventually peaked at number two on October 7, 1989, the same week "Miss You Much" topped the Hot 100. "Cherish" became Madonna's 16th consecutive top-five single, a record by any artist in Hot 100 chart history. It was present on the Hot 100 for a total of 15 weeks. Unlike previous Madonna singles, "Cherish" was not a dance hit and did not make an appearance on the Hot Dance Music/Club Play chart, but was able to top the Adult Contemporary chart, her third after "Live to Tell" and "La Isla Bonita". "Cherish" also helped Madonna to win the Top Adult Contemporary Artist trophy at the 1989 Billboard Music Awards. On the year-end charts of Billboard, "Cherish" ranked at number 59 on the Hot 100 and number 31 on the Adult Contemporary chart. In Canada, "Cherish" debuted at number 80 on the RPM Singles Chart on August 14, 1989. In its ninth week on the chart, the song reached number one, staying there for two weeks. In doing so, "Cherish" became Madonna's tenth number-one hit in Canada, and the third from her Like a Prayer album. The song was present on the chart for 17 weeks and was the ninth best-selling Canadian single for 1989. The track also reached number-one on the RPM Adult Contemporary chart in its seventh week.

On September 1, 1989, "Cherish" was released in the United Kingdom and entered the UK Singles Chart at number 16. The next week, the song moved to its peak position of number three, becoming Madonna's 21st top-ten single in the United Kingdom. According to the Official Charts Company, the song has sold 200,000 copies there. "Cherish" entered the Australian Singles Chart at number 17 on September 17, 1989, and reached a peak of number four, staying on the chart for 16 weeks. In the Netherlands, "Cherish" debuted at number 24 on the Dutch Top 40 chart, and reached a peak of number 15, the next week. "Cherish" also reached the top ten on the record charts across European nations, prompting it to reach number five on the European Hot 100 Singles chart. It also became the most played single on radio across Europe during the week of October 21, 1989.

== Music video ==
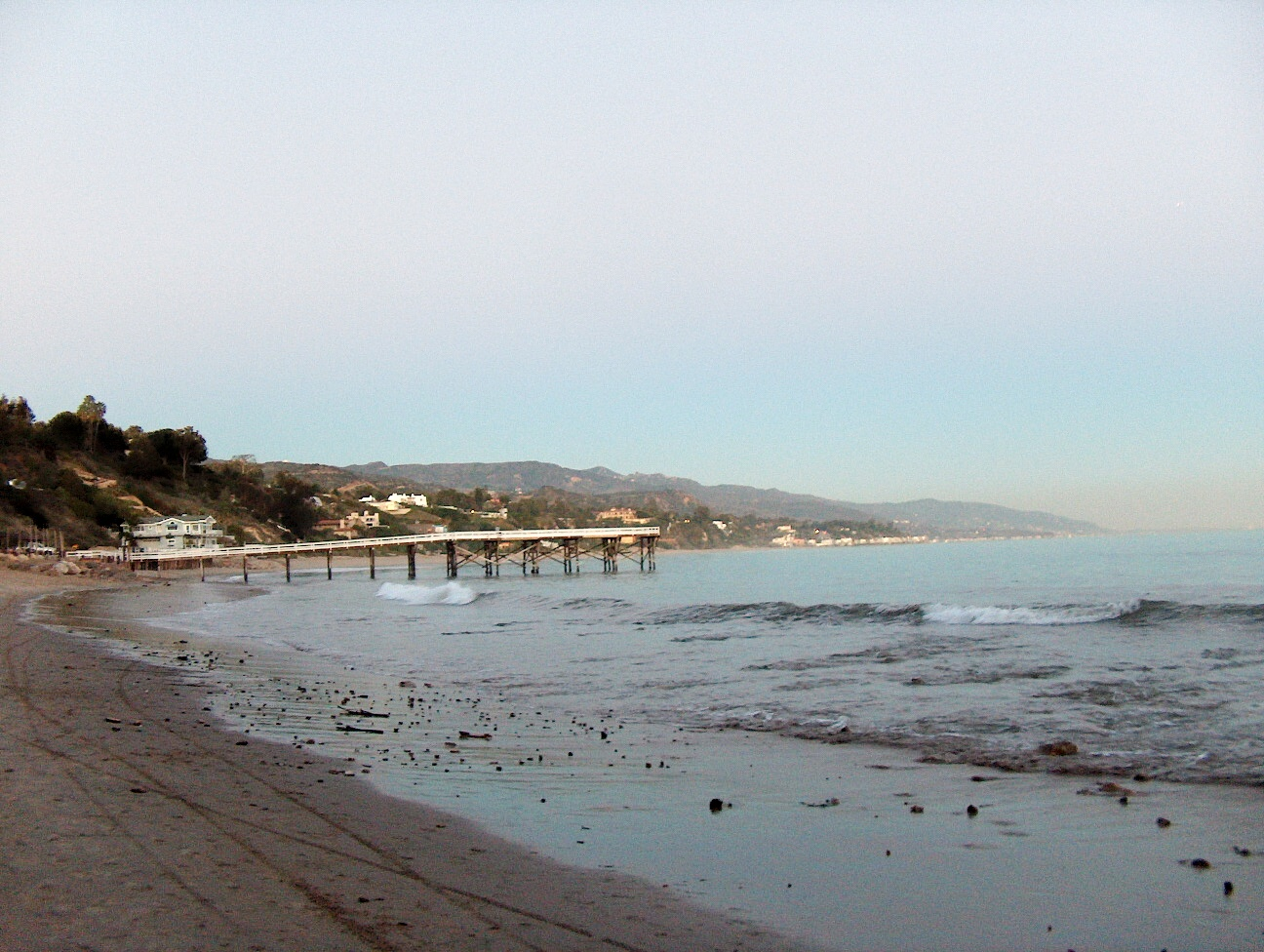
The video was shot at Paradise Cove Beach in Malibu, California.

"Cherish" was promoted by a black-and-white music video that was directed by Herb Ritts and was filmed on July 22, 1989 at Paradise Cove Beach in Malibu, California. Its world premiere took place on MTV on August 21, 1989. Ritts was one of Madonna's preferred photographers at that time and so she asked him to direct the "Cherish" video. Ritts reportedly tried to talk her out of it by saying, "But I'm a still photographer. I don't know anything about film." Undaunted, Madonna replied simply, "Well you have a few weeks to learn." The director practised with a Super 8 film camera while working on a job in Hawaii and after returning confirmed to Madonna that he could helm the video. "Two weeks later, I was filming 'Cherish'. I directed it and did the camera work as well. It was invigorating," he told art curator François Quintin in a 1999 interview.

The video was conceptualized by Ritts, who wanted to portray mermen in their natural habitat, but Madonna baulked at the idea since she wanted to be portrayed as herself, but keep the mermen also. Four male performers were signed for this, one of them being Tony Ward who would become Madonna's boyfriend later, with the other three being water polo players from nearby Pepperdine University. There were four merman tails created by Global Effects in North Hollywood, California for the video. Three full-size tails for the mermen were cast in a solid highly flexible rubber, each weighing around 40 pounds (18 kg). This was necessary to make them neutrally buoyant in water as lighter tails would have floated, causing the swimmers to be head-down in the sea. Once in these tails, the polo players needed to be carried to and from the water and once in it, they had tremendous swimming power and agility. This was partly due to a plastic spring-like armature cast into the flipper of each tail. One of the reasons this video was shot in black and white is because the water was very cold, causing Madonna's already pale complexion to look even whiter.

Intercut scenes of Madonna on a beach, with mermen in water

According to Maura Johnston of Rolling Stone, following its release "The playful video became an MTV staple, a light jaunt on the beach after the controversy-drenched [clips] for 'Like a Prayer' and the future-shocked 'Express Yourself'." Fouz-Hernandez deduced a relationship between the music and the images in the video for "Cherish", saying that they complemented each other; the author felt that this in turn encouraged the viewer to watch the video repeatedly. Fouz-Hernandez talked about the balancing of height and depth occurring in the video. The visual depictions of the mermen and the lighting used in the video were influenced by Ritts' still photograph known as "The Male Nude Bubble", which showed nude male models inside a giant water tank, with a white cloth entwined around them. Many of the qualities in the photos, including the floating nature of the models, were present during the swimming and the posing of the mermen.

Carol Vernallis, author of Experiencing Music Video, found homoerotic connotations between Madonna and the mermen. The mermen in the video exist in a self-contained world of their own, where they procreate with their own kind, both biologically and socially. The fact that the mermen did not seem to possess genitalia led Vernallis to believe that the video associated them with other works by Ritts, namely homoerotic sculptural images without penises. Their tails drew different meanings, including sexual ones and Christian symbolism. Since in contemporary art, images of mermen are rare while mermaids are common, they are sometimes called fairies partly because it is not known how they came to be. Vernallis believed that the mysteriousness and the elusiveness of the mermen in the video played a crucial role. They never address the camera directly and are often shown disappearing from view. Since remaining invisible is a central theme in the homosexual community, for the author this actually portrayed oppression and the desire to watch but never be seen.

== Live performance and covers ==
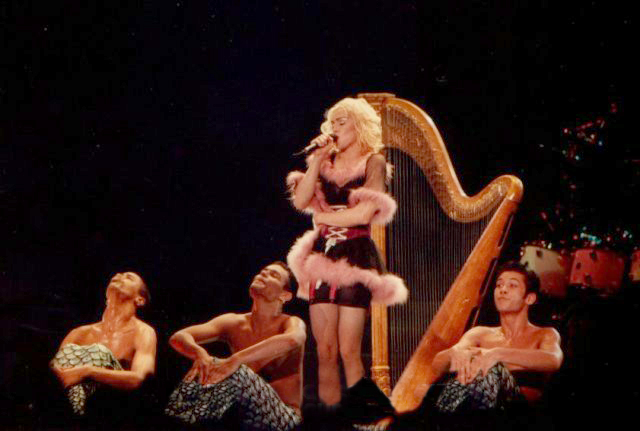
Madonna performing "Cherish" during the 1990 Blond Ambition World Tour. She is flanked by her back up dancers who are dressed up as mermen.

Madonna has performed "Cherish" live only during the 1990 Blond Ambition World Tour. Onstage, the performance mirrored the sequence from the music video, with the appearance of three of Madonna's dancers, dressed as mermen. Author Carol Clerk noted in her book Madonnastyle that the outfit worn by the singer during this sequence was the simplest and the softest costume of the show. It consisted of a black mini-dress trimmed and stitched with a stuffed West African stork, called the marabou. Madonna gyrated around her dancers, while playing with a harp. During the chorus, the dancers lifted their prosthetic fish-tails and joined them with each other. Guilbert felt that the performance de-sexualizes men, since they are relegated to objects of adoration, like the three mermen dancers. This view was shared by Mark Bego, author of Madonna: Blonde Ambition, who said that "Madonna and her girls go into a very girlish mode, but they give the feeling that they are in charge, be it playing with the mermen, or teasing them." Two different performances were taped and released on video, the Blond Ambition Japan Tour 90, taped in Yokohama, Japan, on April 27, 1990, and the Blond Ambition World Tour Live, taped in Nice, France, on August 5, 1990.

The late Brazilian singer Renato Russo included an acoustic cover of the song on his 1994 album The Stonewall Celebration Concert. His version was appreciated by Alvaro Neder of AllMusic. The 2000 compilation album Virgin Voices: A Tribute To Madonna, Vol. 2 contains a cover by worldbeat group Loop Guru. An alternative rock cover of the song by The Prayers was included on the 2007 Madonna tribute compilation Through the Wilderness.

== Track listing and formats ==
- US / CAN / JPN 7" and cassette single
1. "Cherish" (fade) – 4:03
2. "Supernatural" (non-LP track) – 5:12
- US promo 7" single
1. "Cherish" (fade) – 4:03
2. "Cherish" (LP version) – 5:03
- CAN promo 7" single
1. "Cherish" (fade) – 4:03
2. "Supernatural" (non-LP track) – 5:12
- UK / European 7" single
1. "Cherish" (7" version) – 4:03
2. "Supernatural" (non-LP track) – 5:12
- UK 12" single / Reissue CD maxi-single (1995)
1. "Cherish" (extended version) – 6:18
2. "Cherish" (7" version) – 4:03
3. "Supernatural" (non-LP track) – 5:12
- Digital single (2024)
1. "Cherish" (7" version) – 4:03
2. "Cherish" (extended version) – 6:18
3. "Supernatural" – 5:12

== Credits and personnel ==
- Madonna – songwriter, producer
- Patrick Leonard – songwriter, producer, remixer, arranger
- James Guthrie – mixing
- Herb Ritts – cover art, photographer
- Jeri Heiden – calligraphy, artwork design
- Marilyn Martin – background vocals

Credits and personnel adapted from Like a Prayer album liner notes.

== Charts ==
=== Weekly charts ===
Weekly chart performance for "Cherish"
| Chart (1989–1990) | Peak position |
|---|---|
| Australia (ARIA) | 4 |
| Austria (Ö3 Austria Top 40) | 16 |
| Belgium (Ultratop 50 Flanders) | 7 |
| Canada Top Singles (RPM) | 1 |
| Canada Retail Singles (The Record) | 11 |
| Canada Adult Contemporary (RPM) | 1 |
| Chile (UPI) | 9 |
| Ecuador (UPI) | 3 |
| Europe (European Hot 100 Singles) | 5 |
| Finland (Suomen virallinen lista) | 19 |
| France (SNEP) | 21 |
| Germany (GfK) | 16 |
| Iceland (RÚV) | 15 |
| Italy (Musica e dischi) | 3 |
| Italy Airplay (Music & Media) | 2 |
| Ireland (IRMA) | 2 |
| Netherlands (Dutch Top 40) | 15 |
| Netherlands (Single Top 100) | 13 |
| New Zealand (Recorded Music NZ) | 5 |
| Norway (VG-lista) | 10 |
| Portugal (AFP) | 3 |
| Spain (AFYVE) | 10 |
| Switzerland (Schweizer Hitparade) | 10 |
| UK Singles (Official Charts) | 3 |
| US Billboard Hot 100 | 2 |
| US Adult Contemporary (Billboard) | 1 |
| US Cash Box Top 100 | 1 |
| US Radio & Records CHR & Pop Charts | 1 |

=== Year-end charts ===
Year-end chart performance for "Cherish"
| Chart (1989) | Position |
|---|---|
| Australia (ARIA) | 47 |
| Belgium (Ultratop Flanders) | 84 |
| Canada Top Singles (RPM) | 9 |
| Europe (European Hot 100 Singles) | 54 |
| UK Singles (OCC) | 90 |
| US Billboard Hot 100 | 59 |
| US Adult Contemporary (Billboard) | 31 |
| US Cash Box Top 100 | 31 |

== Certifications and sales ==
Certifications and sales for "Cherish"
| Region | Certification | Certified units/sales |
|---|---|---|
| Australia (ARIA) | Gold | 35,000^{^} |
| United Kingdom | — | 200,000 |
^{^} Shipments figures based on certification alone.

== See also ==
- List of number-one singles of 1989 (Canada)
- List of Hot Adult Contemporary number ones of 1989
- List of Cash Box Top 100 number-one singles of 1989

== Bibliography ==
- Bego, Mark (2000). Madonna: blonde ambition. New York: Cooper Square Press. ISBN 0-8154-1051-4.
- Burt, Richard (2002). Shakespeare After Mass Media. Palgrave Macmillan. ISBN 978-0-312-29454-0.
- Clerk, Carol (2002). Madonnastyle. Omnibus Press. ISBN 0-7119-8874-9.
- Dickerson, James (1998). Women On Top: The Quiet Revolution That's Rocking the American Music Industry. Billboard Books. ISBN 978-0-8230-8489-0.
- Fouz-Hernández, Santiago; Jarman-Ivens, Freya (2004). Madonna's Drowned Worlds. Ashgate Publishing, Ltd. ISBN 0-7546-3372-1.
- Guilbert, Georges-Claude (2002). Madonna as postmodern myth. McFarland. ISBN 0-7864-1408-1.
- Metz, Allen; Benson, Carol (1999). The Madonna Companion: Two Decades of Commentary. Music Sales Group. ISBN 0-8256-7194-9.
- Morton, Andrew (2002). Madonna. St. Martin's Press. ISBN 0-312-98310-7.
- O'Brien, Lucy (2007). Madonna: Like an Icon. Bantam Press. ISBN 978-0-593-05547-2.
- Pendle, Karin (2001). Women and Music. Indiana University Press. ISBN 978-0-253-21422-5.
- Raha, Maria (2005). Cinderella's Big Score: Women of the Punk and Indie Underground. Seal Press. ISBN 978-1-58005-116-3.
- Rooksby, Rikky (2004). The Complete Guide to the Music of Madonna. Omnibus Press. ISBN 0-7119-9883-3.
- Salaverri, Fernando (2005). Sólo éxitos: año a año, 1959–2002. Spain: Fundación Autor-SGAE. ISBN 84-8048-639-2.
- Taraborrelli, Randy J. (2002). Madonna: An Intimate Biography. Simon & Schuster. ISBN 978-1-4165-8346-2.
- Vernallis, Carol (2004). Experiencing Music Video: Aesthetics and Cultural Context. Columbia University Press. ISBN 0-231-11799-X.
