= List of Cash Box Top 100 number-one singles of 1989 =

These are the singles that reached number one on the Top 100 Singles chart in 1989 as published by Cash Box magazine.

Key
†	Indicates best-performing single of 1989

Issue date	Song	Artist
January 7	"Every Rose Has Its Thorn"	Poison
January 14	"Every Rose Has Its Thorn"	Poison
January 21	"Two Hearts"	Phil Collins
January 28	"Don't Rush Me"	Taylor Dayne
February 4	"When I'm with You"	Sheriff
February 11	"Straight Up"	Paula Abdul
February 18	"Straight Up"	Paula Abdul
February 25	"Lost In Your Eyes"	Debbie Gibson
March 4	"Lost In Your Eyes"	Debbie Gibson
March 11	"Lost In Your Eyes"	Debbie Gibson
March 18	"The Living Years"	Mike + The Mechanics
March 25	"The Living Years"	Mike + The Mechanics
April 1	"Eternal Flame"	The Bangles
April 8	"Girl You Know It's True"	Milli Vanilli
April 15	"She Drives Me Crazy"	Fine Young Cannibals
April 22	"Like a Prayer" †	Madonna
April 29	"Like a Prayer" †	Madonna
May 6	"Like a Prayer" †	Madonna
May 13	"I'll Be There For You"	Bon Jovi
May 20	"Real Love"	Jody Watley
May 27	"Real Love"	Jody Watley
June 3	"Rock On"	Michael Damian
June 10	"Wind Beneath My Wings"	Bette Midler
June 17	"Wind Beneath My Wings"	Bette Midler
June 24	"Satisfied"	Richard Marx
July 1	"Satisfied"	Richard Marx
July 8	"Good Thing"	Fine Young Cannibals
July 15	"Good Thing"	Fine Young Cannibals
July 22	"Express Yourself"	Madonna
July 29	"Batdance"	Prince
August 5	"Batdance"	Prince
August 12	"Batdance"	Prince
August 19	"Right Here Waiting"	Richard Marx
August 26	"Right Here Waiting"	Richard Marx
September 2	"Cold Hearted"	Paula Abdul
September 9	"Cold Hearted"	Paula Abdul
September 16	"Don't Wanna Lose You"	Gloria Estefan
September 23	"Don't Wanna Lose You"	Gloria Estefan
September 30	"Girl I'm Gonna Miss You"	Milli Vanilli
October 7	"Cherish"	Madonna
October 14	"Miss You Much"	Janet Jackson
October 21	"Miss You Much"	Janet Jackson
October 28	"Miss You Much"	Janet Jackson
November 4	"Sowing The Seeds of Love"	Tears For Fears
November 11	"Listen To Your Heart"	Roxette
November 18	"When I See You Smile"	Bad English
November 25	"Blame It On The Rain"	Milli Vanilli
December 2	"(It's Just) The Way That You Love Me"	Paula Abdul
December 9	"We Didn't Start The Fire"	Billy Joel
December 16	"Another Day in Paradise"	Phil Collins
December 23	"Another Day in Paradise"	Phil Collins
December 30	"Another Day in Paradise"	Phil Collins

== See also ==
- 1989 in music
- List of Hot 100 number-one singles of 1989 (U.S.)
