= List of Dutch Top 40 number-one singles of 2002 =

These hits topped the Dutch Top 40 in 2002 (see 2002 in music).

Issue date	Artist	Song
5 January	Gigi d'Agostino	"L'amour toujours"
12 January	Marco and Sita	"Lopen op het water"
19 January	Marco and Sita	"Lopen op het water"
26 January	Marco and Sita	"Lopen op het water"
2 February	Marco and Sita	"Lopen op het water"
9 February	Shakira	"Whenever, Wherever"
16 February	Shakira	"Whenever, Wherever"
23 February	Shakira	"Whenever, Wherever"
2 March	Shakira	"Whenever, Wherever"
9 March	Shakira	"Whenever, Wherever"
16 March	Shakira	"Whenever, Wherever"
23 March	Shakira	"Whenever, Wherever"
30 March	Shakira	"Whenever, Wherever"
6 April	Shakira	"Whenever, Wherever"
13 April	Mad'House	"Like a Prayer"
20 April	Mad'House	"Like a Prayer"
27 April	Billy Crawford	"Trackin'"
4 May	Billy Crawford	"Trackin'"
11 May	Billy Crawford	"Trackin'"
18 May	Brainpower	"Dansplaat"
25 May	Brainpower	"Dansplaat"
1 June	Brainpower	"Dansplaat"
8 June	Brainpower	"Dansplaat"
15 June	Eminem	"Without Me"
22 June	Eminem	"Without Me"
29 June	Shakira	"Underneath Your Clothes"
6 July	Shakira	"Underneath Your Clothes"
13 July	Shakira	"Underneath Your Clothes"
20 July	Shakira	"Underneath Your Clothes"
27 July	Tiziano Ferro	"Perdono"
3 August	Tiziano Ferro	"Perdono"
10 August	Tiziano Ferro	"Perdono"
17 August	Tiziano Ferro	"Perdono"
24 August	Tiziano Ferro	"Perdono"
31 August	Las Ketchup	"The Ketchup song (Asereje)"
7 September	Las Ketchup	"The Ketchup song (Asereje)"
14 September	Las Ketchup	"The Ketchup song (Asereje)"
21 September	Las Ketchup	"The Ketchup song (Asereje)"
28 September	Las Ketchup	"The Ketchup song (Asereje)"
5 October	Las Ketchup	"The Ketchup song (Asereje)"
21 October	Las Ketchup	"The Ketchup song (Asereje)"
19 October	Las Ketchup	"The Ketchup song (Asereje)"
26 October	Las Ketchup	"The Ketchup song (Asereje)"
2 November	Nelly and Kelly Rowland	"Dilemma"
9 November	Nelly and Kelly Rowland	"Dilemma"
16 November	Nelly and Kelly Rowland	"Dilemma"
23 November	Nelly and Kelly Rowland	"Dilemma"
30 November	Nelly and Kelly Rowland	"Dilemma"
7 December	Nelly and Kelly Rowland	"Dilemma"
14 December	Nelly and Kelly Rowland	"Dilemma"
21 December	Robbie Williams	"Feel"
28 December	Robbie Williams	"Feel"

== See also ==
- 2002 in music
