= List of number-one singles of 1989 (Canada) =

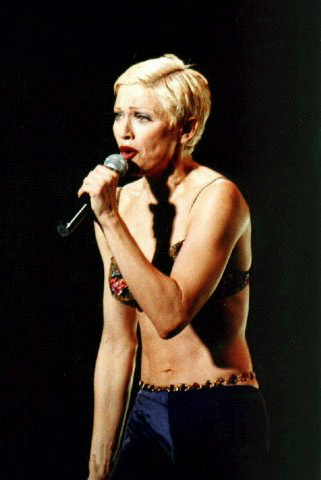
Madonna topped the Canadian chart for five weeks with "Like a Prayer", giving her the best-performing single of 1989.

RPM was a Canadian magazine that published the best-performing singles of Canada from 1964 to 2000. During 1989, twenty-six songs became number-one singles in Canada. Chicago began the year with "Look Away" at the summit while Phil Collins' "Another Day in Paradise" was 1989's final chart-topper. Twelve artists attained the number-one spot for the first time this year: Will to Power, Edie Brickell & New Bohemians, Debbie Gibson, Mike + the Mechanics, Fine Young Cannibals, Paula Abdul, Michael Damian, Love and Rockets, Richard Marx, Milli Vanilli, Roxette, and Bad English. Madonna obtained three number-one singles this year—"Like a Prayer", "Express Yourself", and "Cherish"—while Phil Collins, Fine Young Cannibals, and Richard Marx all picked up two number-one hits.

No Canadian acts reached number one in 1989. Two songs peaked at the top for five weeks: "Like a Prayer" by Madonna and "Right Here Waiting" by Richard Marx; the former song became the most successful single of the year in Canada. Altogether, Madonna spent nine weeks at number one with her three chart-topping hits. Phil Collins totalled seven weeks at number one: a four-week stay with "Two Hearts" and a three-week stay with "Another Day in Paradise", while Richard Marx topped the chart for six combined weeks with "Right Here Waiting" and "Angelia". Fine Young Cannibals spent four weeks at number one, and those who spent at least three weeks atop the chart were Debbie Gibson with "Lost in Your Eyes" and Tears for Fears with "Sowing the Seeds of Love".

Key
† Indicates best-performing single of 1989

== Chart history ==
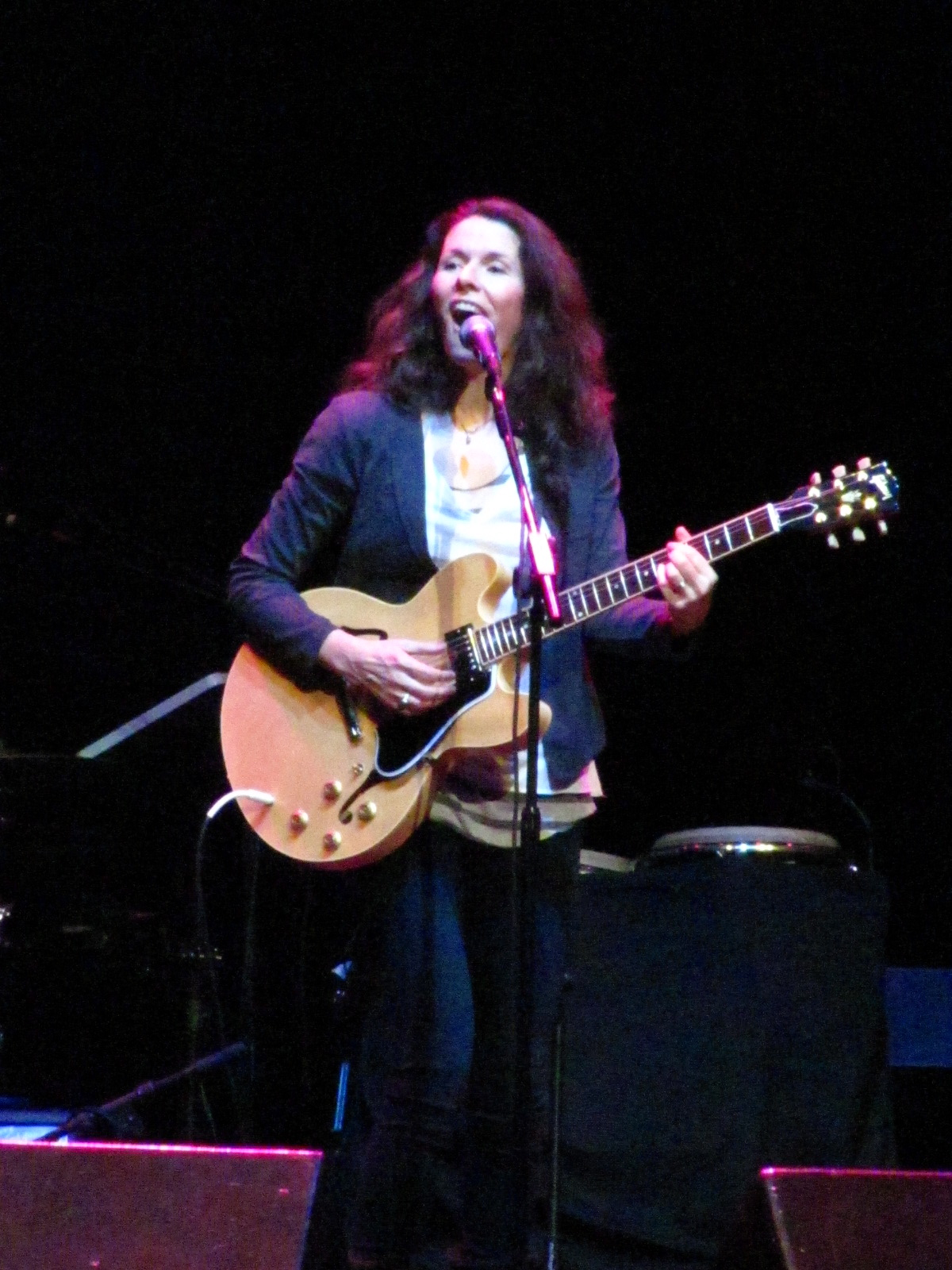
Edie Brickell and her band New Bohemians spent a week at number one with "What I Am".

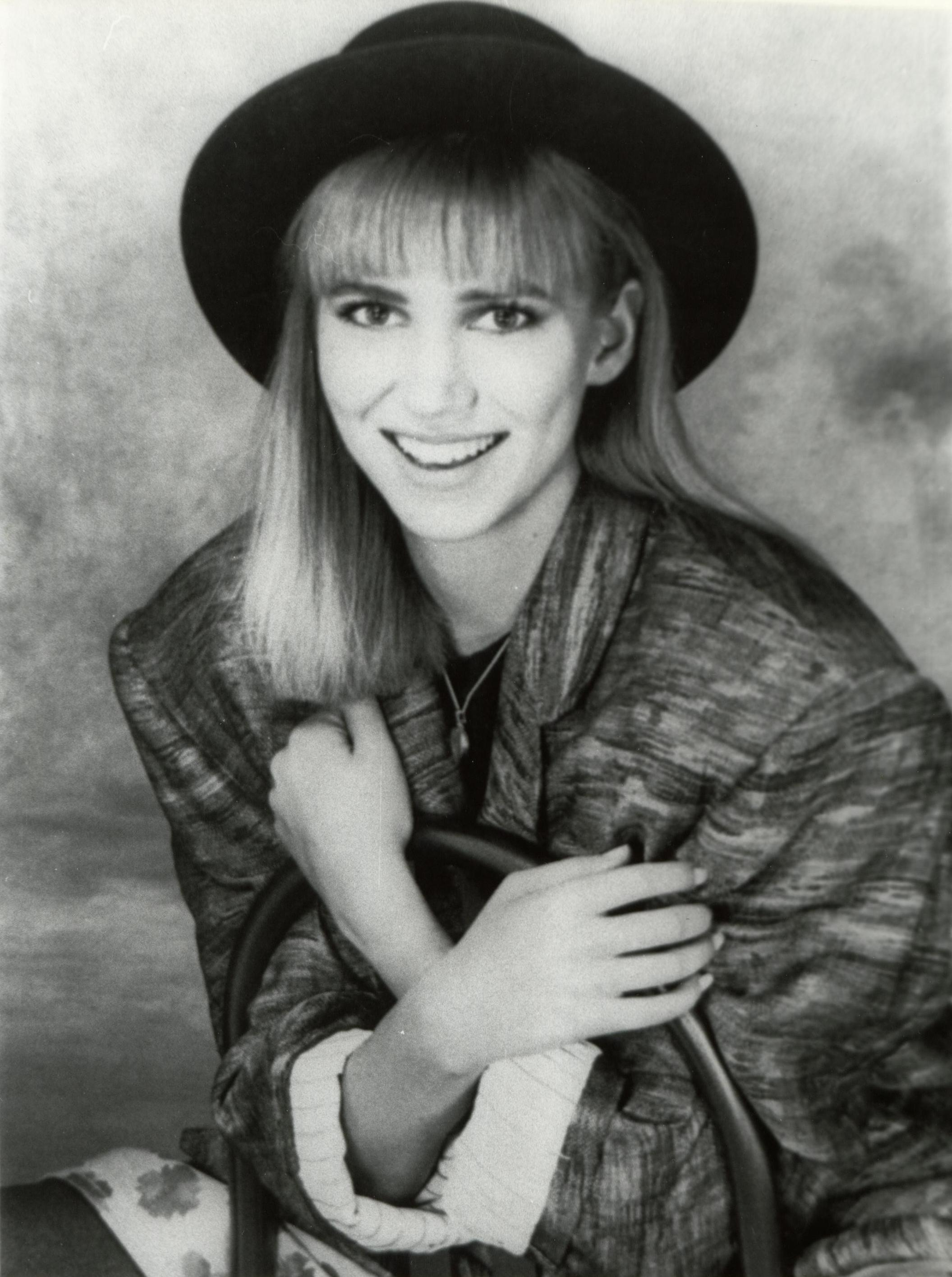
Debbie Gibson held the number-one slot for three weeks with "Lost in Your Eyes" in March and April.

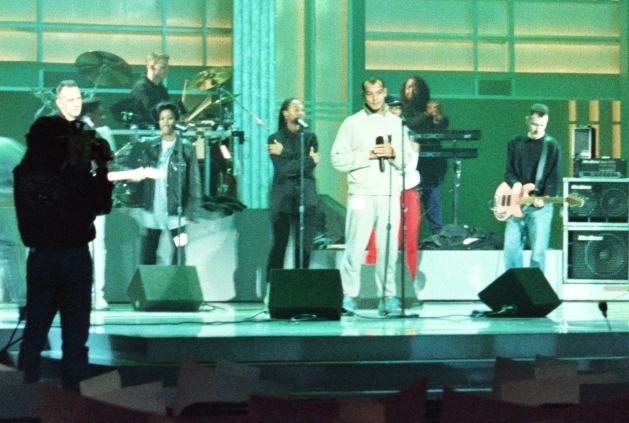
Fine Young Cannibals obtained two Canadian number-one singles in 1989: "She Drives Me Crazy" and "Good Thing".

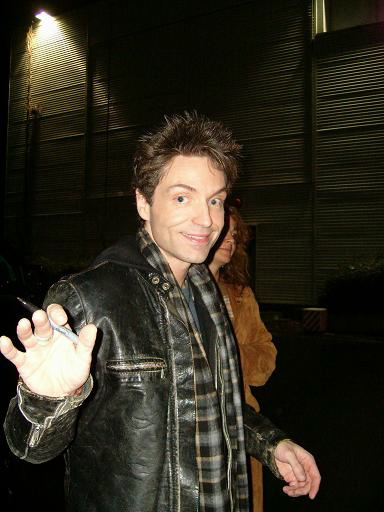
"Right Here Waiting" and "Angelia" gave Richard Marx two Canadian number-one hits and six weeks at number one.

Issue date	Song	Artist	Reference
7 January (Note: Due to a two-week break in publication over the 1988/1989 Christmas/New Year period, the week of 7 January is inferred.)	"Look Away"	Chicago	
14 January	"Baby, I Love Your Way/Freebird Medley"	Will to Power	
21 January	"Two Hearts"	Phil Collins	
28 January	"Two Hearts"	Phil Collins	
4 February	"Two Hearts"	Phil Collins	
11 February	"Two Hearts"	Phil Collins	
18 February	"Angel of Harlem"	U2	
25 February	"Angel of Harlem"	U2	
4 March	"She Wants to Dance with Me"	Rick Astley	
11 March	"What I Am"	Edie Brickell & New Bohemians	
18 March	"Lost in Your Eyes"	Debbie Gibson	
25 March	"Lost in Your Eyes"	Debbie Gibson	
1 April	"Lost in Your Eyes"	Debbie Gibson	
8 April	"The Living Years"	Mike + The Mechanics	
15 April	"The Living Years"	Mike + The Mechanics	
22 April	"She Drives Me Crazy"	Fine Young Cannibals	
29 April	"Like a Prayer"†	Madonna	
6 May	"Like a Prayer"†	Madonna	
13 May	"Like a Prayer"†	Madonna	
20 May	"Like a Prayer"†	Madonna	
27 May	"Like a Prayer"†	Madonna	
3 June	"Forever Your Girl"	Paula Abdul	
10 June	"Forever Your Girl"	Paula Abdul	
17 June	"Rock On"	Michael Damian	
24 June	"Rock On"	Michael Damian	
1 July	"Pop Singer"	John Cougar Mellencamp	
8 July	"Good Thing"	Fine Young Cannibals	
15 July	"Good Thing"	Fine Young Cannibals	
22 July	"Good Thing"	Fine Young Cannibals	
29 July	"Express Yourself"	Madonna	
5 August	"Express Yourself"	Madonna	
12 August	"Batdance"	Prince	
19 August	"So Alive"	Love and Rockets	
26 August	"So Alive"	Love and Rockets	
2 September	"Right Here Waiting"	Richard Marx	
9 September	"Right Here Waiting"	Richard Marx	
16 September	"Right Here Waiting"	Richard Marx	
23 September	"Right Here Waiting"	Richard Marx	
30 September	"Right Here Waiting"	Richard Marx	
7 October	"Girl I'm Gonna Miss You"	Milli Vanilli	
14 October	"Cherish"	Madonna	
21 October	"Cherish"	Madonna	
28 October	"Mixed Emotions"	The Rolling Stones	
4 November	"Sowing the Seeds of Love"	Tears for Fears	
11 November	"Sowing the Seeds of Love"	Tears for Fears	
18 November	"Sowing the Seeds of Love"	Tears for Fears	
25 November	"Listen to Your Heart"	Roxette	
2 December	"When I See You Smile"	Bad English	
9 December	"Angelia"	Richard Marx	
16 December	"Another Day in Paradise"	Phil Collins	
23 December	"Another Day in Paradise"	Phil Collins	
30 December (Note: Due to a two-week break in publication over the 1989/1990 Christmas/New Year period, the week of 30 December is inferred.)	"Another Day in Paradise"	Phil Collins	

== See also ==
- 1989 in music
- List of Billboard Hot 100 number ones of 1989
