= 1001 Songs =

2005 compendium by Toby Creswell

1001 Songs: The Great Songs of All Time and the Artists, Stories and Secrets Behind Them
- First edition
- Author: Toby Creswell
- Language: English
- Subject: Popular music
- Published: 2005 (Hardie Grant Books); 2006 (Thunder's Mouth Press)
- Publication place: Australia
- Media type: Print
- Pages: 880
- ISBN: 978-1-74066-458-5
- OCLC: 182730209
- Dewey Decimal: 781.64

1001 Songs: The Great Songs of All Time and the Artists, Stories and Secrets Behind Them is a compendium of notable popular recordings collected by Australian rock journalist and critic Toby Creswell. The book was initially published in 2005 by Hardie Grant Books (Prahran, Victoria) and subsequently published in the United States by Thunder's Mouth Press (an imprint of the Avalon Publishing Group) in 2006. It is not a collection of songs, but of the stories behind what Creswell considers are the great songs of all time – from George Gershwin to Missy Elliott, from Bob Dylan to Alicia Keys, from Frank Sinatra to The Offspring, from Leonard Cohen to Pulp. The book also features over 400 photographs and album covers.

1001 Songs is used extensively by Brian Nankervis, creator, producer and adjudicator, of SBS program RocKwiz as a source of information for questions on the show. In the foreword to the book, Creswell states the main research source was All Music Guide, which was consulted for release dates, songwriting credits and album listings, together with the website, Rock's Backpages.

Creswell wrote his first article on rock & roll for Nation Review in 1972. He subsequently wrote articles about all aspects of popular culture and music for RAM, Billboard, Roadrunner and a range of national and international magazines and newspapers. He has worked for MTV and a variety of television programs as a writer and presenter. In 1985, he became editor of the Australian edition of Rolling Stone and two years later was in a partnership which took over the franchise. He continued to edit Rolling Stone until September 1992. He was a founding editor of Juice.
