= Melting the Venusberg =

2004 book by Heidi Epstein

Melting the Venusberg: A Feminist Theology of Music
- Authors: Heidi Epstein
- Language: English
- Subject: Theology of music
- Publisher: Continuum International Publishing Group
- Publication date: 2004
- Publication place: United States
- Media type: Print (hardcover)
- Pages: 300
- ISBN: 9780826416483

Melting the Venusberg: A Feminist Theology of Music is a 2004 book by Heidi Epstein, in which the author provides a critique of the foundations of the understanding of Western music. She argues that this understanding has reinforced social prejudices, particularly those against women and this is more evident in religious music.
